= Daniel Bois =

Canadian racing driver (born 1984)

- Born: November 9, 1984 (age 42); Bracebridge, Ontario, Canada

NASCAR Canada Series career
- 21 races run over 5 years
- Car no., team: No. 93 (JASS Racing with XEMIS Racing)
- 2026 position: 42nd
- Best finish: 16th (2023)
- First race: 2013 Pinty's Presents the Vortex 200 (Mosport)
- Last race: 2026 WeatherTech 200 (Mosport)
Wins	Top tens	Poles
0	7	0
- Statistics up to date as of September 13, 2026.

Daniel Bois (born November 9, 1984) is a Canadian professional stock car racing driver. He competes part-time in the NASCAR Canada Series, driving the No. 93 Chevrolet for JASS Racing with XEMIS Racing.

== Racing career ==
Bois debuted in the NASCAR Canadian Tire Series in 2013, debuting at Canadian Tire Motorsport Park. He ran a race in the OSCAAR Modified Series in 2014, finishing 13th. In 2019, he competed in two Can-Am Midget Racing events at Sauble Speedway. He returned to the renamed NASCAR Pinty's Series in 2022, driving for MBS Motorsports. He would run eight races in 2023, scoring a best finish of seventh twice. He competed in five races in the now NASCAR Canada Series in 2024, with a best finish of eighth coming at Circuit ICAR.

On August 12, 2026, it was announced Bois would return to the Canada Series in the series debut at Markham Street Circuit, driving JASS Racing with XEMIS Racing's No. 93 Chevrolet.

== Motorsports career results ==
=== NASCAR ===
(key) (Bold – Pole position awarded by qualifying time. Italics – Pole position earned by points standings or practice time. * – Most laps led.)

==== Canada Series ====
NASCAR Canada Series results
Year	Team	No.	Make	1	2	3	4	5	6	7	8	9	10	11	12	13	14	NCSC	Pts	Ref
2013	DJK Racing	28	Dodge	MSP; 23	DEL	MSP	ICAR	MPS	SAS	ASE	CTR	RIS	MSP	BAR				41st	51	
2013	Trevor Seibert	69	Dodge												KWA; 14			41st	51	
2022	MBS Motorsports	31	Chevrolet	SUN	MSP; 12	ACD	AVE	TOR; 7	EDM	SAS	SAS	CTR	OSK; 12	ICAR; 24	MSP	DEL		25th	121	
2023	MBS Motorsports	31	Chevrolet	SUN; 14	MSP; 11	ACD	AVE	TOR; 25	EIR	SAS	SAS	CTR; 21	OSK; 7	OSK; 17	ICAR; 8	MSP; 7	DEL	16th	242	
2024	MBS Motorsports	31	Chevrolet	MSP; 22	ACD	AVE	RIS	RIS	OSK; 9	SAS	EIR	CTR; 30		MSP; 16	DEL	AMS		17th	135	
2024	Larry Jackson Racing	84	Chevrolet										ICAR; 8					17th	135	
2026	JASS Racing with XEMIS Racing	93	Chevrolet	MSP	ACD	ACD	RIS	AMS	AMS	CMP	EIR	EIR	CTR	MAR; 8	ICAR	MSP; 14	DEL	42nd	66	

^{*} Season still in progress
^{1} Ineligible for series points
