= Martin Goulet Jr. =

Canadian racing driver

- Born: Saint-Calixte, Quebec, Canada

NASCAR Canada Series career
- 11 races run over 3 years
- Car no., team: No. 83 (Goulet Motorsports); No. 93 (JASS Racing with XEMIS Racing)
- 2026 position: 16th
- Best finish: 16th (2026)
- First race: 2024 XPN 250 (Montmagny)
- Last race: 2026 NTN BCA 200 (Delaware)
Wins	Top tens	Poles
0	1	0
- Statistics up to date as of September 13, 2026.

Martin Goulet Jr. is a Canadian professional stock car racing driver. He competes part-time in the NASCAR Canada Series, driving the No. 83 Chevrolet for his family-owned team Goulet Motorsports and the No. 93 Chevrolet for JASS Racing with XEMIS Racing.

== Racing career ==
A second-generation driver from Saint-Calixte, Quebec, Goulet began racing in the Serie ACT Quebec and NASCAR Whelen All-American Series in 2009. Between 2009 and 2025, Goulet made 55 Serie ACT Quebec starts, scoring a win in 2015 at Autodrome Saint-Eustache. Other series he has competed in include the ACT Late Model Tour, PASS North Super Late Model Series, PASS National Championship Super Late Model Series, Canadian Stock Car Championship, and Serie Procam Super Truck. He scored a win at Circuit Trois-Rivières in the lone Canadian Stock Car Championship season in 2018.

=== NASCAR Canada Series ===
Goulet made his NASCAR Canada Series debut in 2024 at Autodrome Montmagny, driving the No. 83 Dodge. After qualifying in ninth, Goulet finished 22nd due to overheating issues forcing him to retire after 68 laps. He returned for two races in 2025, finishing last in 29th at Trois-Rivières following a lap six crash and 17th at Montmagny. Goulet began running more races in 2026, starting with the doubleheader at Autodrome Chaudière, where he scored his first career top-ten in the Bud Light 125 but would finish 19th in the Michelob Ultra 125 due to brake issues. At Riverside International Speedway, he began driving under the No. 93 to help Jacques Guenette Sr. gain more owner points. Engine issues would force him to retire after 31 laps and he would finish 19th. He drove the No. 93 in the doubleheader at Montmagny, finishing twentieth in both the XPN Burn-X 125 and Carlyle Tools 150, finishing under power in the former and retiring after 16 laps in the latter due to transmission issues. Goulet returned to the No. 83 for Circuit Trois-Rivières.

== Motorsports career results ==
=== NASCAR ===
(key) (Bold – Pole position awarded by qualifying time. Italics – Pole position earned by points standings or practice time. * – Most laps led.)

==== Canada Series ====
NASCAR Canada Series results
Year	Team	No.	Make	1	2	3	4	5	6	7	8	9	10	11	12	13	14	NCSC	Pts	Ref
2024	Goulet Motorsports	83	Chevy	MSP	ACD	AVE	RIS	RIS	OSK	SAS	EIR	CTR	ICAR	MSP	DEL	AMS; 22		61st	22	
2025	Goulet Motorsports	83	Chevy	MSP	RIS	EDM	SAS	CMP	ACD	CTR; 29	ICAR	MSP	DEL	DEL	AMS; 17			39th	42	
2026	Goulet Motorsports	83	Chevy	MSP	ACD; 8	ACD; 19							CTR; 19	MAR	ICAR; 14	MSP	DEL; 16	16th	222	
2026	JASS Racing with XEMIS Racing	93	Chevy				RIS; 14	AMS; 20	AMS; 20	CMP	EIR	EIR						16th	222	
