= Herby Drescher =

Canadian racing driver (born 1969)

- Born: January 1, 1969 (age 57); Mirabel, Quebec, Canada

NASCAR Canada Series career
- 16 races run over 3 years
- Car no., team: No. 53 (Herby Motorsports); No. 85 (Larry Jackson Racing); No. 98 (Bray Autosport)
- 2026 position: 17th
- Best finish: 17th (2026)
- First race: 2023 Ebay Motors 200 (Mosport)
- Last race: 2026 WeatherTech 200 (Mosport)
Wins	Top tens	Poles
0	0	0
- Statistics up to date as of September 13, 2026.

Herby Drescher (born January 1, 1969) is a Canadian professional stock car racing driver and crew chief. He competes part-time in the NASCAR Canada Series, driving the No. 85 Dodge for Larry Jackson Racing, the No. 98 Ford for Bray Autosport, and the No. 53 Dodge for his own team, Herby Motorsports.

== Racing career ==
Drescher made his debut in the NASCAR Pinty’s Series in 2023 at Canadian Tire Motorsport Park, finishing 19th; he made four more starts during the season, finishing a best of 15th twice, coming at Exhibition Place and Circuit ICAR. Drescher made three starts in the renamed Canada Series in 2024, tying his best of 15th at CTMP. Drescher was parked during the race at ICAR and later received a points penalty and was indefinitely suspended from NASCAR until the completion of anger management training. Drescher returned to the series in 2026, initially as a start and park driver for Larry Jackson Racing and Bray Autosport. At Autodrome Chaudière, Drescher only ran four laps in both races of the doubleheader, finishing last in the twenty car field each time. He finished last of 17 cars at Riverside International Speedway and failed to start the first race at Autodrome Montmagny, but completed 28 laps in the second race, finishing 19th of 22 cars. At Circuit Trois-Rivières, Drescher entered in his own Herby Motorsports entry, finishing 27th due to electrical issues. He returned at ICAR and CTMP, finishing 17th and 32nd respectively.

== Personal life ==
Drescher owns Herby's Lifts, a company that buys and rebuilds forklifts. The company often appears as a sponsor on his racecars.

== Motorsports career results ==
=== NASCAR ===
(key) (Bold – Pole position awarded by qualifying time. Italics – Pole position earned by points standings or practice time. * – Most laps led.)

==== Canada Series ====
NASCAR Canada Series results
Year	Team	No.	Make	1	2	3	4	5	6	7	8	9	10	11	12	13	14	NCSC	Pts	Ref
2023	Herby Motorsports	53	Dodge	SUN	MSP; 19	ACD	AVE	TOR; 15	EIR	SAS	SAS	CTR; 16	OSK	OSK	ICAR; 15	MSP; 16	DEL	22nd	139	
2024	Herby Motorsports	53	Dodge	MSP; 15	ACD	AVE	RIS	RIS	OSK	SAS	EIR	CTR; 17	ICAR; 18	MSP	DEL	AMS		38th	70	
2026	Larry Jackson Racing	85	Dodge	MSP	ACD; 20	ACD; 20												17th	178	
2026	Bray Autosport	98	Ford				RIS; 17	AMS; 22	AMS; 19	CMP	EIR	EIR						17th	178	
2026	Herby Motorsports	53	Dodge										CTR; 27	MAR	ICAR; 17	MSP; 32	DEL	17th	178	

^{*} Season still in progress
^{1} Ineligible for series points
