= Will Larue =

Canadian racing driver

William Larue
- Born: Quebec City, Quebec, Canada

NASCAR Canada Series career
- 14 races run over 3 years
- Car no., team: No. 45 (Larue Motorsports)
- 2026 position: 11th
- Best finish: 11th (2025)
- First race: 2024 Bud Light 300 (Chaudière)
- Last race: 2026 WeatherTech 200 (Mosport)
- First win: 2025 Bud Light 250 (Chaudière)
Wins	Top tens	Poles
1	11	3
- Statistics up to date as of September 13, 2026.

William Larue is a Canadian professional stock car racing driver. He competes part-time in the NASCAR Canada Series, driving the No. 45 Chevrolet for his family's team, Larue Motorsports.

== Racing career ==
Larue began attending races as a teenager, but took an interest in racing through sim racing, and with guidance from former Larue Motorsport driver Alex Labbé, made the leap to the track. He began racing in 2018 after purchasing a late model stock car. Since 2019, Larue has competed in multiple late model stock races each year at Autodrome Chaudière, the track where he would later score his first win in the car.

Larue made his first of two NASCAR Canada Series starts in 2024 at Autodrome Chaudière. Power steering issues would relegate him to a 21st place finish in the 22 car field. He would return for the series finale at Autodrome Montmagny, where he finished second to Kevin Lacroix.

Larue returned to the Canada Series in 2025, finishing second in the race at Riverside International Speedway. In the 2025 Bud Light 250, his fourth career start, Larue beat Donald Theetge to score his first career NASCAR Canada Series win. He then finished second in the season finale at Autodrome Montmagny. Larue will compete in nine races in 2026.

== Motorsports career results ==
=== NASCAR ===
(key) (Bold – Pole position awarded by qualifying time. Italics – Pole position earned by points standings or practice time. * – Most laps led.)

==== Canada Series ====
NASCAR Canada Series results
Year	Team	No.	Make	1	2	3	4	5	6	7	8	9	10	11	12	13	14	NCSC	Pts	Ref
2024	Larue Motorsports	45	Chevy	MSP	ACD; 21	AVE	RIS	RIS	OSK	SAS	EIR	CTR	ICAR	MSP	DEL	AMS; 2		42nd	65	
2025	Larue Motorsports	45	Chevy	MSP	RIS; 2	EDM	SAS	CMP	ACD; 1	CTR	ICAR	MSP	DEL	DEL	AMS; 2			20th	132	
2026	Larue Motorsports	45	Chevy	MSP; 18	ACD; 3	ACD; 3	RIS	AMS; 2*	**AMS**; 4	CMP	**EIR**; 2	**EIR**; 4	CTR; 18	MAR	ICAR	MSP; 9	DEL	11th	342	

^{*} Season still in progress
^{1} Ineligible for series points
