= NASCAR Canada Series at Autodrome Montmagny =

NASCAR Canada Series races in Montmagny, Quebec

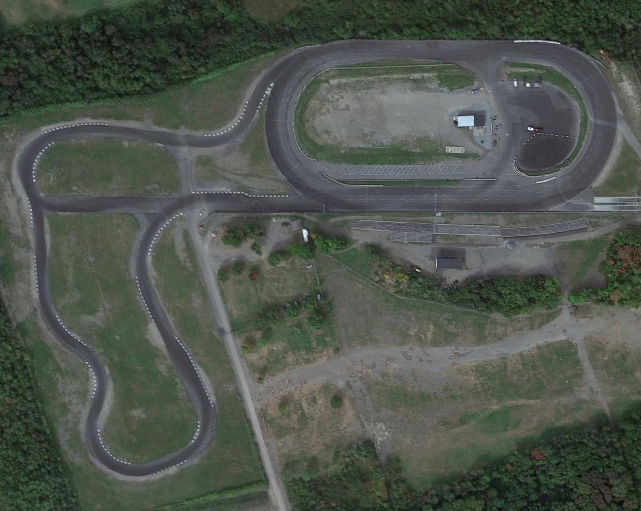

NASCAR Canada Series
- Venue: Autodrome Montmagny
- Location: Montmagny, Quebec
- First race: 2024

Circuit information
- Surface: Asphalt
- Turns: 4

Stock car races in the NASCAR Canada Series have been held at Autodrome Montmagny in Montmagny, Quebec, Canada, since 2024.

== First race ==
XPN Burn-X 125
NASCAR Canada Series
- Venue: Autodrome Montmagny
- Location: Montmagny, Quebec
- First race: 2024
- Laps: 125
- Previous names: XPN 250 (2024–2025)

Circuit information
- Surface: Asphalt
- Turns: 4

The XPN Burn-X 125 is the name of the first race, it was the season finale in 2024 and 2025 and became part of a doubleheader race in 2026. Marc-Antoine Camirand is the defending winner.

=== Past winners ===
Year	Date	Driver	Laps	Report	Ref
2024	September 22	Kevin Lacroix	250	Report	
2025	September 21	Marc-Antoine Camirand	250	Report	
2026	July 4	Marc-Antoine Camirand	126	Report	

== Second race ==
Delta Electrolyte 150
NASCAR Canada Series
- Venue: Autodrome Montmagny
- Location: Montmagny, Quebec
- First race: 2026
- Laps: 150

Circuit information
- Surface: Asphalt
- Turns: 4

The Delta Electrolyte 150 is the name of the second race, it debuted as part of a doubleheader weekend with the first race in 2026. Marc-Antoine Camirand is the defending winner.

=== Past winners ===
Year	Date	Driver	Laps	Report	Ref
2026	July 4	Marc-Antoine Camirand	150	Report	

Previous race: Pinty's 300	NASCAR Canada Series; XPN Burn-X 125/Delta Electrolyte 150	Next race: NAPA 150
