= NASCAR Canada Series at Edmonton International Raceway =

NASCAR Canada Series races in Edmonton, Alberta

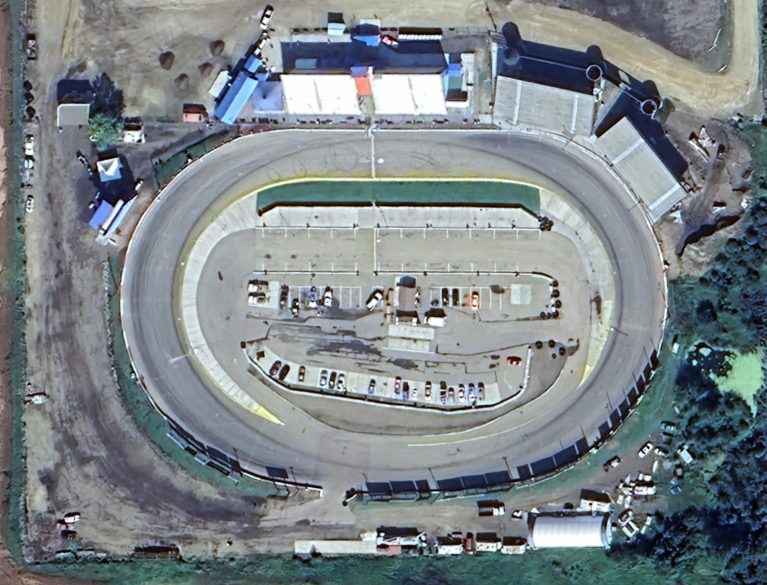

NASCAR Canada Series
- Venue: Edmonton International Raceway
- Location: Edmonton, Alberta

Circuit information
- Surface: Asphalt
- Turns: 4

Stock car races in the NASCAR Canada Series have been held annually at Edmonton International Raceway in Edmonton, Alberta, Canada since 2014.

== First race ==
Dorman Products 150
NASCAR Canada Series
- Venue: Edmonton International Raceway
- Location: Edmonton, Alberta
- First race: 2014
- Previous names: Alberta Has Energy 300 (2014–2015); Alberta Has New Energy 300 (2016); Luxxur 300 (2017–2019); BAYER 300 (2022–2023); NAPA 300 (2024–2025)
- Most wins (driver): Marc-Antoine Camirand

Circuit information
- Surface: Asphalt
- Turns: 4

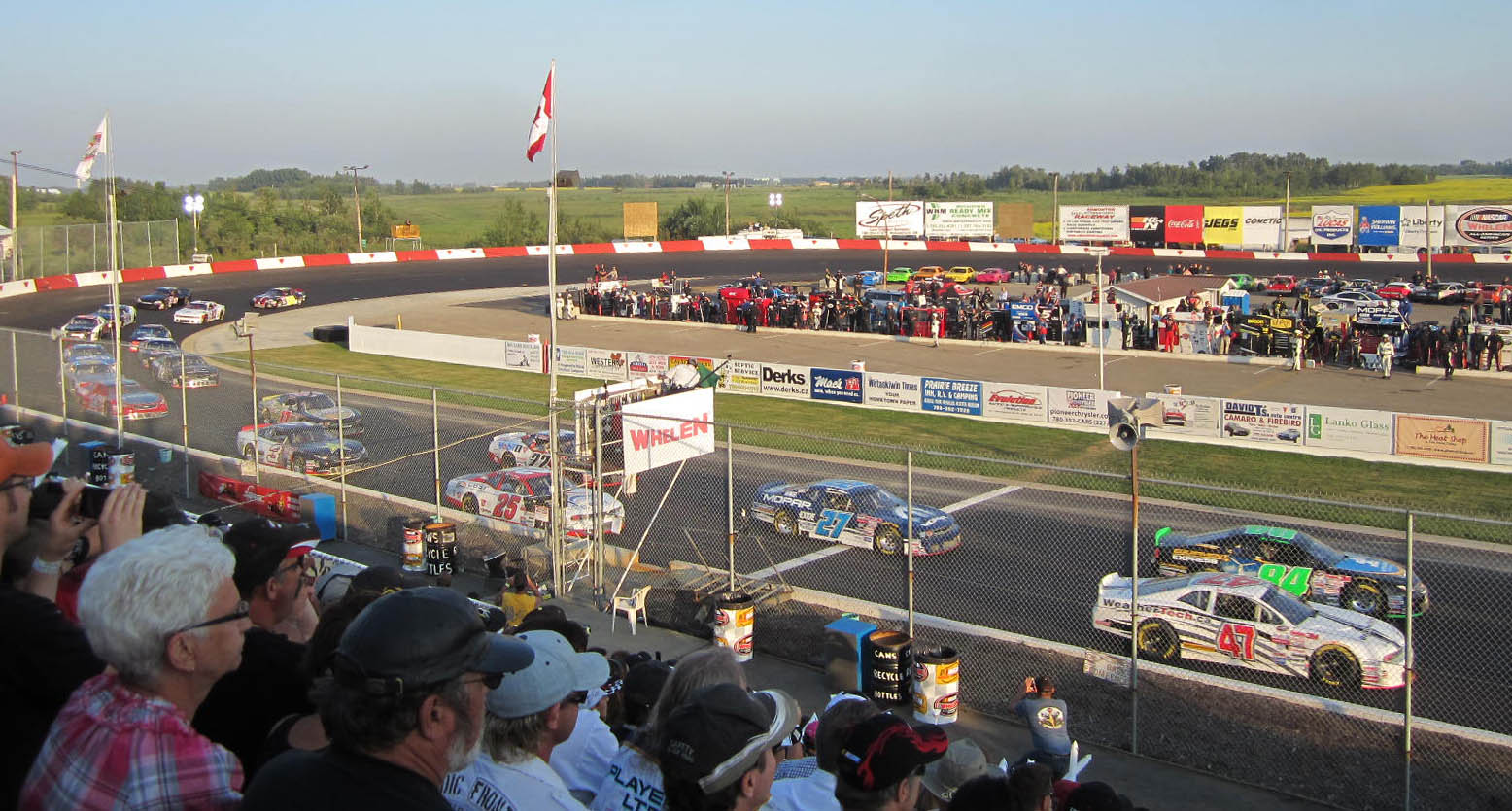
Green flag for the inaugural race in 2014

The Dorman Products 150 is the current name of the first race and has been held since every year 2014 excluding 2020 and 2021, it is the first race of the doubleheader, Kevin Lacroix is the defending winner, having won it in 2026.

=== Past winners ===
Year	Date	Driver	Report	Ref
2014	July 11	Andrew Ranger	Report	
2015	July 11	Scott Steckly	Report	
2016	July 23	Alex Tagliani	Report	
2017	July 29	Alex Labbé	Report	
2018	July 28	Louis-Philippe Dumoulin	Report	
2019	July 27	Andrew Ranger	Report	
Not held in 2020 and 2021
2022	July 23	Marc-Antoine Camirand	Report	
2023	July 22	Marc-Antoine Camirand	Report	
2024	July 27	Kevin Lacroix	Report	
2025	July 12	Marc-Antoine Camirand	Report	
2026	July 25	Kevin Lacroix	Report	

== Second race ==
Carlyle Tools 150
NASCAR Canada Series
- Venue: Edmonton International Raceway
- Location: Edmonton, Alberta
- First race: 2026

Circuit information
- Surface: Asphalt
- Turns: 4

The Carlyle Tools 150 is the current name of the second race and the second race of the doubleheader, Marc-Antoine Camirand is the defending winner, having won it in 2026.

=== Past winners ===
Year	Date	Driver	Report	Ref
2026	July 25	Marc-Antoine Camirand	Report	

Previous race: NAPA 150	NASCAR Canada Series; Dorman Products 150/Carlyle Tools 150	Next race: Le Tours 45 CarGurus (points); Omnifab Sprints (exhibition)
