= NAPA 150 =

NASCAR Canada Series races in Calabogie, Ontario

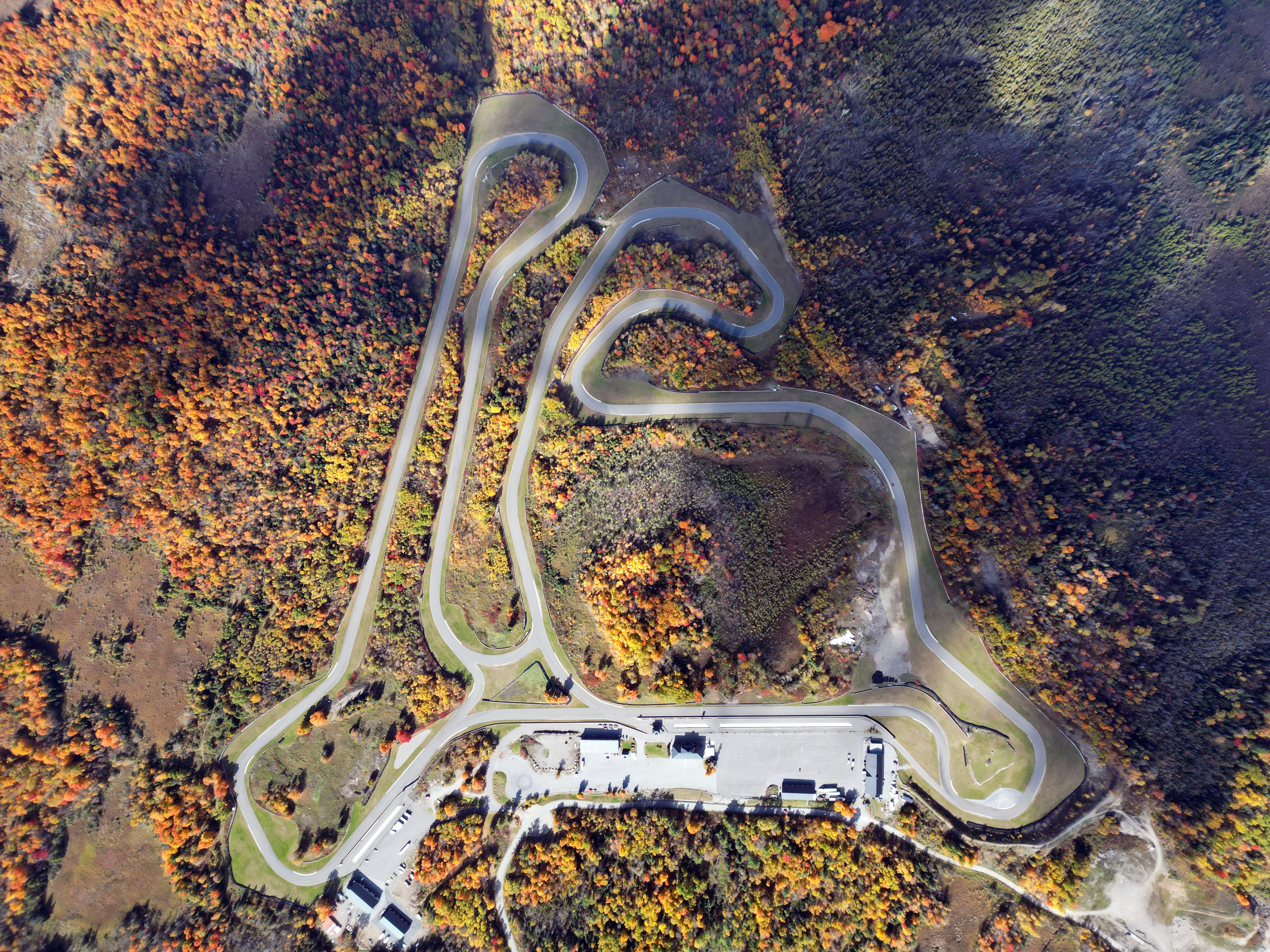

NASCAR Canada Series
- Venue: Calabogie Motorsports Park
- Location: Calabogie, Ontario
- Corporate sponsor: NAPA Auto Parts
- First race: 2025
- Laps: 50
- Previous names: Calabogie 150 Clash of the Titans (2025)

Circuit information
- Surface: Polymer Modified Asphalt
- Turns: 20

The NAPA 150 is a NASCAR Canada Series race held annually at Calabogie Motorsports Park in Calabogie, Ontario since the 2025 season, Alex Tagliani is the defending winner, having won it in 2026.

== History ==
The race was announced to be part of the 2025 Canada Series schedule on December 20, 2024 when the 2025 schedule was released. The inaugural race was held on July 27, 2025 as the Calabogie 150 Clash of the Titans, Connor Bell won the inaugural race.

On July 14, 2026, it was announced NAPA Auto Parts would be the title sponsor of the 2026 race, becoming the NAPA 150.

== Past winners ==
Year	Date	Driver	Report	Ref
2025	July 27	Connor Bell	Report	
2026	July 19	Alex Tagliani	Report	

Previous race: XPN Burn-X 125/Delta Electrolyte 150	NASCAR Canada Series; NAPA 150	Next race: Dorman Products 150/Carlyle Tools 150
