= NASCAR Canada Series at Riverside International Speedway =

NASCAR Canada Series races in Antigonish, Nova Scotia

NASCAR Canada Series
- Venue: Riverside International Speedway
- Location: Antigonish, Nova Scotia
- First NCS race: 2007

Circuit information
- Surface: Asphalt
- Turns: 4

Stock car races in the NASCAR Canada Series have been held at Riverside International Speedway in Antigonish, Nova Scotia since the series' inception in 2007.

== Current race ==
Pinty's 300
NASCAR Canada Series
- Venue: Riverside International Speedway
- Location: Antigonish, Nova Scotia
- First NCS race: 2007
- Laps: 300

Circuit information
- Surface: Asphalt
- Turns: 4

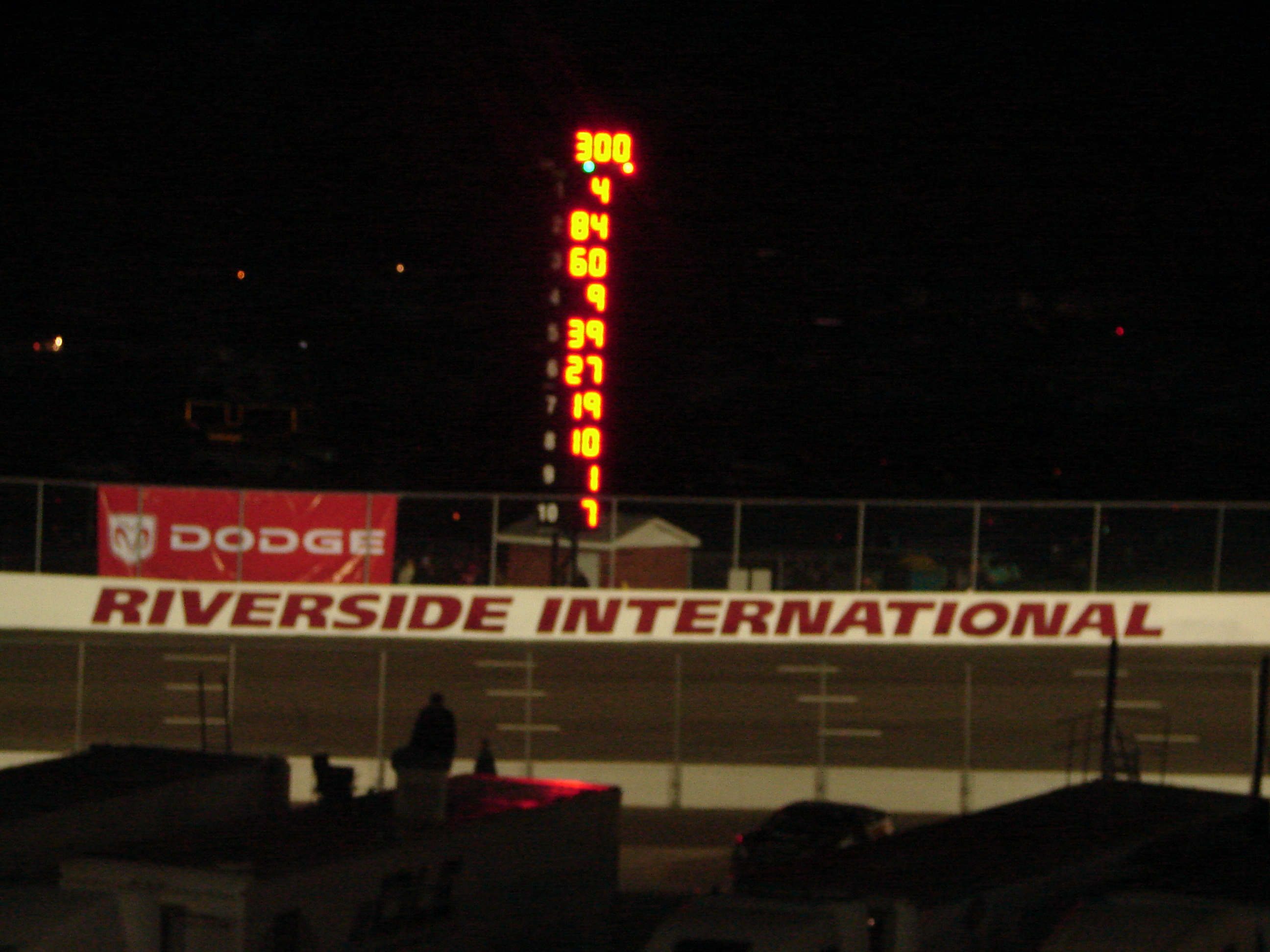
Riverside's tower following the 2008 Canada Series race

The Pinty's 300 is the current name of the race, it has been held every year since 2007, with the exception of 2020-2023, when the race was put on hiatus, but it returned in 2024. Kevin Lacroix is the defending winner, having won it in 2026.

=== History ===
Riverside was added to the inaugural Canada Series schedule in 2007, it was the first track on the Canada Series schedule to be located east of Quebec, Mark Dilley won the inaugural race. Statistically, eight of the first 12 NASCAR races held at Riverside were won by the driver who went on to win the overall series championship that same season.

From 2020 to 2023, the race was put on hiatus because of the COVID-19 pandemic, but it returned as part of a doubleheader in 2024.

=== Past winners ===
Year	Date	Driver	Miles	Report	Ref
2007	September 16	Mark Dilley	100	Report	
2008	September 20	Don Thomson Jr.	100	Report	
2009	September 20	Andrew Ranger	100	Report	
2010	September 18	D. J. Kennington	100	Report	
2011	September 17	Scott Steckly	100	Report	
2012	September 15	D. J. Kennington	100	Report	
2013	August 17	Jason Hathaway	100	Report	
2014	August 16	Donald Chisholm	100	Report	
2015	August 15	Scott Steckly	100	Report	
2016	August 20	Cayden Lapcevich	100	Report	
2017	August 20	Alex Labbé	100	Report	
2018	August 19	Louis-Philippe Dumoulin	100	Report	
2019	August 17	Jason Hathaway	102	Report	
2020–2023	Not held				
2024	June 29	Kevin Lacroix	50	Report	
2025	June 29	D. J. Kennington	100	Report	
2026	June 27	Kevin Lacroix	100	Report	

== Former race ==
Choko 150
NASCAR Canada Series
- Venue: Riverside International Speedway
- Location: Antigonish, Nova Scotia
- First NCS race: 2024
- Last race: 2024
- Laps: 150

Circuit information
- Surface: Asphalt
- Turns: 4

The Choko 150 was a NASCAR Canada Series race held at Riverside only once in 2024 as part of the doubleheader that year, Kevin Lacroix is the only winner of the event.

=== Past winners ===
Year	Date	Driver	Miles	Report	Ref
2024	June 30	Kevin Lacroix	50	Report	

Previous race: Bud Light 125/Michelob Ultra 125	NASCAR Canada Series; Pinty's 300	Next race: XPN Burn-X 125/Delta Electrolyte 150
