= 2026 WeatherTech 200 =

13th race of the 2026 NASCAR Canada Series

Race details
- Race 13 of 14 in the 2026 NASCAR Canada Series season
- Date: September 6, 2026
- Location: Canadian Tire Motorsport Park in Clarington, Ontario, Canada
- Course: 10-turn road course
- Course length: 2.459 miles (3.957 km)
- Distance: 52 laps, 127.868 mi (205.784 km)
- Scheduled distance: 51 laps, 125.41 mi (201.81 km)
- Average speed: 75.155 miles per hour (120.950 km/h)

Pole position
Driver	Kyle Steckly	MBS Motorsports
- Time: 1:22.996

Most laps led
Driver	Andrew Ranger	Innovation Auto Sport
- Laps: 21

Winner
No. 27	Andrew Ranger	Innovation Auto Sport

Television in the United States
- Network: REV TV on YouTube

The 2026 WeatherTech 200 was the thirteenth stock car race of the 2026 NASCAR Canada Series. The race was held on Sunday, September 6, 2026, at Canadian Tire Motorsport Park, a 2.459 mi (3.957 km) road course in Clarington, Ontario, Canada. The race featured the largest field in series history, with 38 cars starting the race. 39 cars were on the provisional entry list, but the No. 85 withdrew from the event. The race went beyond the scheduled 51 lap distance due to overtime, with Andrew Ranger ultimately holding off Marc-Antoine Camirand and Cayden Lapcevich to score his first win of the season.

== Report ==
=== Background ===
Canadian Tire Motorsport Park is a multi-track motorsport venue located north of Bowmanville in Clarington, Ontario, Canada, approximately 75 kilometres (47 miles) east of Toronto. The facility features a 3.957 km (2.459 mi), 10-turn road course; a 2.9 km (1.8 mi) advance driver and race driver training facility with a 0.402 km (0.250 mi) skid pad (Driver Development Centre) and a 1.5 km (0.93 mi) kart track.

==== Entry list ====
- (R) denotes rookie driver.
- (i) denotes driver who is ineligible for series driver points.

#	Driver	Team	Make
0	Glenn Styres	Glenn Styres Racing	Chevrolet
1	Jean-Philippe Bergeron	Prolon Racing Team	Ford
3	Connor Bell (R)	Ed Hakonson Racing	Chevrolet
6	Peter Klutt	Legendary Motorcar Company	Dodge
8	Justin Arseneau	Ed Hakonson Racing	Chevrolet
9	Mathieu Kingsbury	Innovation Auto Sport	Chevrolet
10	Trevor Hill (R)	MRN Racing Inc.	Chevrolet
14	Geoff Johnson (R)	Johnson Motorsports	Ford
16	Nicholas Barrette (R)	Boissonneault Racing Team	Chevrolet
17	D. J. Kennington	DJK Racing	Dodge
22	Kyle Steckly	MBS Motorsports	Chevrolet
24	Jared Odrick (R)	BC Race Cars	Ford
27	Andrew Ranger	Innovation Auto Sport	Chevrolet
28	Brad Ranson (R)	DJK Racing	Chevrolet
38	Tyler Gonzalez (R)	RGR Motorsports	Ford
39	Alex Guenette	JASS Racing with XEMIS Racing	Chevrolet
42	Ryan Klutt	Legendary Motorcar Company	Dodge
44	J. R. Fitzpatrick	Glenn Styres Racing with Velocity Race Cars and J. R. Motorsports	Chevrolet
45	Will Larue (R)	Larue Motorsports	Chevrolet
47	L. P. Dumoulin	Dumoulin Compétition	Dodge
48	Ron Tomlinson (R)	Tomlinson Motorsports	Ford
53	Herby Drescher	Herby Motorsports	Dodge
55	Serge Bordeau	BCM Motorsports	Dodge
67	David Thorndyke	Promotive Racing	Chevrolet
69	Domenic Scrivo	MBS Motorsports	Chevrolet
71	Gary Klutt	Legendary Motorcar Company	Dodge
73	Sylvain Ouellet (R)	Theetge Motorsports	Chevrolet
74	Kevin Lacroix	Innovation Auto Sport	Chevrolet
75	Benoît Couture	BCM Motorsports	Dodge
76	Cayden Lapcevich	Glenn Styres Racing with Velocity Race Cars	Chevrolet
80	Alex Tagliani	Theetge Motorsports	Chevrolet
84	Larry Jackson	Larry Jackson Racing	Dodge
87	Sam Fellows	Fellows McGraw Racing	Chevrolet
88	Simon Charbonneau	Eighty8 Racing	Chevrolet
93	Jacques Guenette Sr. (R)	JASS Racing with XEMIS Racing	Chevrolet
96	Marc-Antoine Camirand	Paillé Course//Racing	Chevrolet
98	Malcolm Strachan	Jim Bray Autosport	Ford
99	Matthew Scannell	Larry Jackson Racing	Dodge

== Practice ==
Practice was held on Saturday, September 5, at 12:40 PM EST. Alex Labbé, stepping in for Matthew Scannell, would set the fastest time in the session with a lap of 1:24.014 and a speed of 105.368 mph (169.573 km/h).

Pos.	#	Driver	Team	Make	Time	Speed
1	99	Alex Labbé	Larry Jackson Racing	Dodge	1:24.014	105.368
2	27	Andrew Ranger	Innovation Auto Sport	Chevrolet	1:24.336	104.966
3	96	Marc-Antoine Camirand	Paillé Course//Racing	Chevrolet	1:24.405	104.880
Full practice results

== Qualifying ==
Qualifying was held on Saturday, September 5, at 4:45 PM EST. Kyle Steckly, driving for MBS Motorsports, would win the pole with a lap of 1:22.996 and a speed of 106.661 mph (171.654 km/h).

=== Qualifying results ===
Pos.	#	Driver	Team	Make	Time	Speed
1	22	Kyle Steckly	MBS Motorsports	Chevrolet	1:22.996	106.661
2	38	Tyler Gonzalez (R)	RGR Motorsports	Ford	1:23.099	106.528
3	80	Alex Tagliani	Theetge Motorsports	Chevrolet	1:23.402	106.141
4	71	Gary Klutt	Legendary Motorcar Company	Dodge	1:23.543	105.962
5	3	Connor Bell (R)	Ed Hakonson Racing	Chevrolet	1:23.682	105.786
6	27	Andrew Ranger	Innovation Auto Sport	Chevrolet	1:23.781	105.661
7	96	Marc-Antoine Camirand	Paillé Course//Racing	Chevrolet	1:23.833	105.596
8	39	Alex Guenette	JASS Racing with XEMIS Racing	Chevrolet	1:23.877	105.540
9	47	L. P. Dumoulin	Dumoulin Compétition	Dodge	1:23.892	105.521
10	17	D. J. Kennington	DJK Racing	Dodge	1:24.156	105.190
11	87	Sam Fellows	Fellows McGraw Racing	Chevrolet	1:24.412	104.871
12	74	Kevin Lacroix	Innovation Auto Sport	Chevrolet	1:24.444	104.832
13	98	Malcolm Strachan	Jim Bray Autosport	Ford	1:24.662	104.562
14	45	Will Larue (R)	Larue Motorsports	Chevrolet	1:24.800	104.392
15	9	Mathieu Kingsbury	Innovation Auto Sport	Chevrolet	1:24.822	104.364
16	1	J. P. Bergeron	Prolon Racing Team	Ford	1:24.869	104.307
17	88	Simon Charbonneau	Eighty8 Racing	Chevrolet	1:24.879	104.294
18	6	Peter Klutt	Legendary Motorcar Company	Dodge	1:24.961	104.194
19	42	Ryan Klutt	Legendary Motorcar Company	Dodge	1:24.961	104.194
20	99	Matthew Scannell	Larry Jackson Racing	Dodge	1:25.008	104.136
21	8	Justin Arseneau	Ed Hakonson Racing	Chevrolet	1:25.017	104.125
22	44	J. R. Fitzpatrick	Glenn Styres Racing with Velocity Race Cars and J. R. Motorsports	Chevrolet	1:25.141	103.973
23	76	Cayden Lapcevich	Glenn Styres Racing with Velocity Race Cars	Chevrolet	1:25.400	103.658
24	10	Trevor Hill (R)	MRN Racing Inc.	Chevrolet	1:25.806	103.168
25	0	Glenn Styres	Glenn Styres Racing	Chevrolet	1:26.333	102.538
26	48	Ron Tomlinson (R)	Tomlinson Motorsports	Ford	1:26.439	102.412
27	24	Jared Odrick (R)	BC Race Cars	Ford	1:26.462	102.385
28	16	Nicholas Barrette (R)	Boissonneault Racing Team	Chevrolet	1:26.492	102.349
29	73	Sylvain Ouellet (R)	Theetge Motorsports	Chevrolet	1:26.494	102.347
30	84	Larry Jackson	Larry Jackson Racing	Dodge	1:26.796	101.991
31	28	Brad Ranson (R)	DJK Racing	Chevrolet	1:27.040	101.705
32	53	Herby Drescher	Herby Motorsports	Dodge	1:27.492	101.180
33	14	Geoff Johnson (R)	Johnson Motorsports	Ford	1:27.551	101.111
34	67	David Thorndyke	Promotive Racing	Chevrolet	1:28.588	99.928
35	55	Serge Bordeau	BCM Motorsports	Dodge	1:30.542	97.771
36	75	Ben Couture	BCM Motorsports	Dodge	1:34.111	94.063
37	93	Jacques Guenette Sr. (R)	JASS Racing with XEMIS Racing	Chevrolet	1:34.843	93.337
38	69	Daniel Bois	MBS Motorsports	Chevrolet	–	–
Full qualifying results

== Race results ==
Pos	St	#	Driver	Team	Manufacturer	Laps	Led	Status	Points
1	6	27	Andrew Ranger	Innovation Auto Sport	Chevrolet	52	21	Running	48
2	7	96	Marc-Antoine Camirand	Paillé Course//Racing	Chevrolet	52	0	Running	42
3	25	76	Cayden Lapcevich	Glenn Styres Racing with Velocity Race Cars	Chevrolet	52	0	Running	41
4	8	39	Alex Guenette	JASS Racing with XEMIS Racing	Chevrolet	52	0	Running	40
5	9	47	L. P. Dumoulin	Dumoulin Compétition	Dodge	52	0	Running	39
6	4	71	Gary Klutt	Legendary Motorcar Company	Dodge	52	0	Running	38
7	26	44	J. R. Fitzpatrick	Glenn Styres Racing with Velocity Race Cars and J. R. Motorsports	Chevrolet	52	0	Running	37
8	21	8	Justin Arseneau	Ed Hakonson Racing	Chevrolet	52	0	Running	36
9	14	45	Will Larue (R)	Larue Motorsports	Chevrolet	52	0	Running	35
10	3	80	Alex Tagliani	Theetge Motorsports	Chevrolet	52	0	Running	34
11	1	22	Kyle Steckly	MBS Motorsports	Chevrolet	52	12	Running	34
12	12	74	Kevin Lacroix	Innovation Auto Sport	Chevrolet	52	0	Running	32
13	19	6	Peter Klutt	Legendary Motorcar Company	Dodge	52	0	Running	31
14	37	93	Daniel Bois	JASS Racing with XEMIS Racing	Chevrolet	52	0	Running	30
15	38	24	Josh Hurley (R)	BC Race Cars	Ford	52	0	Running	29
16	15	9	Mathieu Kingsbury	Innovation Auto Sport	Chevrolet	52	0	Running	28
17	23	28	Brad Ranson (R)	DJK Racing	Chevrolet	52	0	Running	27
18	11	87	Sam Fellows	Fellows McGraw Racing	Chevrolet	52	0	Running	26
19	17	88	Simon Charbonneau	Eighty8 Racing	Chevrolet	52	0	Running	25
20	36	69	Domenic Scrivo	MBS Motorsports	Chevrolet	52	0	Running	24
21	30	73	Sylvain Ouellet (R)	Theetge Motorsports	Chevrolet	52	0	Running	23
22	32	14	Geoff Johnson (R)	Johnson Motorsports	Ford	52	0	Running	22
23	29	16	Nicholas Barrette	Boissonneault Racing Team	Chevrolet	52	0	Running	21
24	10	17	D. J. Kennington	DJK Racing	Dodge	52	9	Running	21
25	20	99	Matthew Scannell	Larry Jackson Racing	Dodge	51	0	Running	19
26	22	84	Larry Jackson	Larry Jackson Racing	Dodge	51	0	Running	18
27	16	1	J. P. Bergeron	Prolon Racing Team	Ford	51	0	Running	17
28	28	48	Ron Tomlinson (R)	Tomlinson Motorsports	Ford	50	0	Accident	16
29	34	55	Serge Bordeau	BCM Motorsports	Dodge	50	0	Running	15
30	35	75	Benoît Couture	BCM Motorsports	Dodge	49	0	Running	14
31	24	10	Trevor Hill (R)	MRN Racing Inc.	Chevrolet	49	0	Running	13
32	31	53	Herby Drescher	Herby Motorsports	Dodge	49	0	Running	12
33	33	67	David Thorndyke	Promotive Racing	Chevrolet	48	0	Accident	11
34	5	3	Connor Bell (R)	Ed Hakonson Racing	Chevrolet	44	0	Running	10
35	18	42	Ryan Klutt	Legendary Motorcar Company	Dodge	42	0	Mechanical	9
36	13	98	Malcolm Strachan	Bray Autosport	Ford	12	0	Axle	8
37	2	38	Tyler Gonzalez (R)	RGR Motorsports	Ford	11	10	Electrical	8
38	27	0	Glenn Styres	Glenn Styres Racing	Chevrolet	8	0	Accident	6

== Standings after the race ==
	Pos	Driver	Points
	1	Marc-Antoine Camirand	581
	2	L. P. Dumoulin	496 (–85)
	3	Kevin Lacroix	465 (–116)
3	4	Andrew Ranger	434 (–147)
1	5	D. J. Kennington	432 (–149)
	6	Alex Tagliani	420 (–161)
2	7	Connor Bell	420 (–161)
	8	Alex Guenette	412 (–169)
	9	Larry Jackson	386 (–195)
	10	Donald Theetge	360 (–221)

Previous race: 2026 NAPA 100	NASCAR Canada Series; 2026 season	Next race: 2026 NTN BCA 200
