= 2026 Michelob Ultra 125 =

3rd race of the 2026 NASCAR Canada Series

Race details
- Race 3 of 14 in the 2026 NASCAR Canada Series season
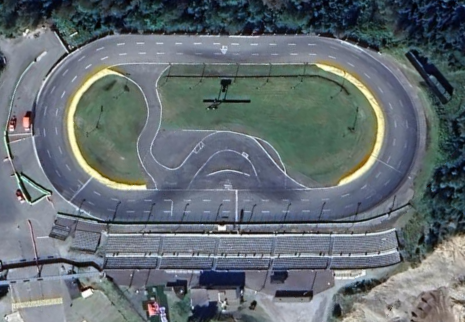
- Date: June 6, 2026
- Location: Autodrome Chaudière in Vallée-Jonction, Quebec, Canada
- Course: Permanent racing facility
- Course length: 0.250 miles (0.402 km)
- Distance: 125 laps, 31.25 mi (50.29 km)
- Average speed: 49.407 miles per hour (79.513 km/h)

Pole position
Driver	Marc-Antoine Camirand	Paillé Course//Racing
- Grid positions set by competition-based formula

Most laps led
Driver	Marc-Antoine Camirand	Paillé Course//Racing
- Laps: 67

Winner
No. 96	Marc-Antoine Camirand	Paillé Course//Racing

Television in the United States
- Network: REV TV on YouTube

The 2026 Michelob Ultra 125 was the third race of the 2026 NASCAR Canada Series. The race was originally scheduled for Saturday, June 6, 2026, but was moved to the following day, June 7, due to weather, at Autodrome Chaudière, a 0.250 mi (0.402 km) oval shaped racetrack in Vallée-Jonction, Quebec, Canada and was the second race of a doubleheader. Marc-Antoine Camirand secured the lead from Donald Theetge on the final restart and would score his second win of the season and of the day. Theetge finished the race in second and Will Larue founded out the podium in third.

== Report ==
=== Background ===
Autodrome Chaudière is a 0.250 mi (0.402 km), high banked, asphalt short track located in Vallée-Jonction, Quebec, Canada, about 65 km (40 mi) south of Quebec City. The circuit opened in 1992 as a dirt track. In 2005, the track underwent resurfacing to convert it into an asphalt track.

==== Entry list ====
- (R) denotes rookie driver.
- (i) denotes driver who is ineligible for series driver points.

#	Driver	Team	Make
0	Glenn Styres	Glenn Styres Racing	Chevrolet
3	Alex Tagliani	Ed Hakonson Racing	Chevrolet
8	Connor Bell (R)	Ed Hakonson Racing	Chevrolet
9	Mathieu Kingsbury	Innovation Auto Sport	Chevrolet
10	Rob Naismith (R)	MRN Racing Inc.	Chevrolet
17	D. J. Kennington	DJK Racing	Dodge
27	Andrew Ranger	Innovation Auto Sport	Chevrolet
36	Alex Labbé	LL Motorsports	Chevrolet
37	Simon Dion-Viens	SDV Autosport	Dodge
38	Mike Goudie	RGR Motorsports	Ford
39	Alex Guenette	JASS Racing with XEMIS Racing	Chevrolet
45	William Larue (R)	Larue Motorsports	Chevrolet
47	L. P. Dumoulin	Dumoulin Compétition (Note: Entry was in collaboration with DJK Racing.)	Dodge
54	Dave Coursol	Coursol Performance	Chevrolet
74	Kevin Lacroix	Innovation Auto Sport	Chevrolet
80	Donald Theetge	Theetge Motorsports	Chevrolet
83	Martin Goulet Jr. (R)	Goulet Motorsports	Chevrolet
84	Larry Jackson	Larry Jackson Racing	Dodge
85	Herby Drescher	Larry Jackson Racing	Dodge
96	Marc-Antoine Camirand	Paillé Course//Racing	Chevrolet

== Practice ==
Two practice sessions were scheduled for Saturday, June 6, with the first scheduled for 11:20 AM EST and the second scheduled for 12:55 PM EST. Activity at the track was canceled due to weather.

== Qualifying ==
Qualifying was scheduled for Saturday, June 6, at 4:00 PM EST. Due to the cancellation of on-track activity on Saturday, the starting lineup was set by each driver's fastest lap in the Bud Light 125.

=== Starting lineup ===
Pos.	#	Driver	Team	Make
1	96	Marc-Antoine Camirand	Paillé Course//Racing	Chevrolet
2	80	Donald Theetge	Theetge Motorsports	Chevrolet
3	17	D. J. Kennington	DJK Racing	Dodge
4	74	Kevin Lacroix	Innovation Auto Sport	Chevrolet
5	27	Andrew Ranger	Innovation Auto Sport	Chevrolet
6	47	L. P. Dumoulin	Dumoulin Compétition	Dodge
7	39	Alex Guenette	JASS Racing with XEMIS Racing	Chevrolet
8	45	Will Larue (R)	Larue Motorsports	Chevrolet
9	54	Dave Coursol	Coursol Performance	Chevrolet
10	9	Mathieu Kingsbury	Innovation Auto Sport	Chevrolet
11	36	Alex Labbé	LL Motorsports	Chevrolet
12	8	Connor Bell (R)	Ed Hakonson Racing	Chevrolet
13	0	Glenn Styres	Glenn Styres Racing	Chevrolet
14	37	Simon Dion-Viens	SDV Autosport	Dodge
15	83	Martin Goulet Jr. (R)	Goulet Motorsports	Chevrolet
16	3	Alex Tagliani	Ed Hakonson Racing	Chevrolet
17	10	Rob Naismith (R)	MRN Racing Inc.	Chevrolet
18	84	Larry Jackson	Larry Jackson Racing	Dodge
19	38	Michael Goudie	RGR Motorsports	Ford
20	85	Herby Drescher	Larry Jackson Racing	Dodge

== Race results ==
Pos	St	#	Driver	Team	Manufacturer	Laps	Led	Status	Points
1	1	96	Marc-Antoine Camirand	Paillé Course//Racing	Chevrolet	125	67	Running	45
2	2	80	Donald Theetge	Theetge Motorsports	Chevrolet	125	58	Running	43
3	8	45	Will Larue (R)	Larue Motorsports	Chevrolet	125	0	Running	41
4	11	36	Alex Labbé	LL Motorsports	Chevrolet	125	0	Running	40
5	10	9	Mathieu Kingsbury	Innovation Auto Sport	Chevrolet	125	0	Running	39
6	4	74	Kevin Lacroix	Innovation Auto Sport	Chevrolet	125	0	Running	38
7	5	27	Andrew Ranger	Innovation Auto Sport	Chevrolet	125	0	Running	37
8	6	47	L. P. Dumoulin	Dumoulin Compétition	Dodge	125	0	Running	36
9	9	54	Dave Coursol	Coursol Performance	Chevrolet	125	0	Running	35
10	17	10	Rob Naismith (R)	MRN Racing, Inc.	Chevrolet	125	0	Running	34
11	12	8	Connor Bell (R)	Ed Hakonson Racing	Chevrolet	125	0	Running	33
12	18	84	Larry Jackson	Larry Jackson Racing	Dodge	125	0	Running	32
13	13	0	Glenn Styres	Glenn Styres Racing	Chevrolet	125	0	Running	31
14	7	39	Alex Guenette	JASS Racing with XEMIS Racing	Chevrolet	124	0	Running	30
15	3	17	D. J. Kennington	DJK Racing	Dodge	119	0	Running	29
16	19	38	Michael Goudie	RGR Motorsports	Ford	119	0	Running	28
17	16	3	Alex Tagliani	Ed Hakonson Racing	Chevrolet	118	0	Running	27
18	14	37	Simon Dion-Viens	SDV Autosport	Dodge	116	0	Running	26
19	15	83	Martin Goulet Jr. (R)	Goulet Motorsports	Chevrolet	108	0	Brakes	25
20	20	85	Herby Drescher	Larry Jackson Racing	Dodge	4	0	Ignition	24

== Standings after the race ==
	Pos	Driver	Points
	1	Marc-Antoine Camirand	131
4	2	Will Larue	109 (–22)
	3	L. P. Dumoulin	107 (–24)
3	4	Andrew Ranger	102 (–29)
3	5	D. J. Kennington	102 (–29)
1	6	Connor Bell	102 (–29)
3	7	Alex Guenette	100 (–31)
1	8	Mathieu Kingsbury	100 (–31)
2	9	Dave Coursol	97 (–34)
1	10	Kevin Lacroix	89 (–42)

Previous race: 2026 Bud Light 125	NASCAR Canada Series; 2026 season	Next race: 2026 Pinty's 300
