= 2026 NASCAR Canada Series =

20th season of the NASCAR Canada Series

The 2026 NASCAR Canada Series was the twentieth season of the Canada Series, the national stock car racing series in Canada sanctioned by NASCAR. The season began on May 17 with the CarGurus 200 at Canadian Tire Motorsport Park and finished with the NTN BCA 200 at Delaware Speedway on September 12.

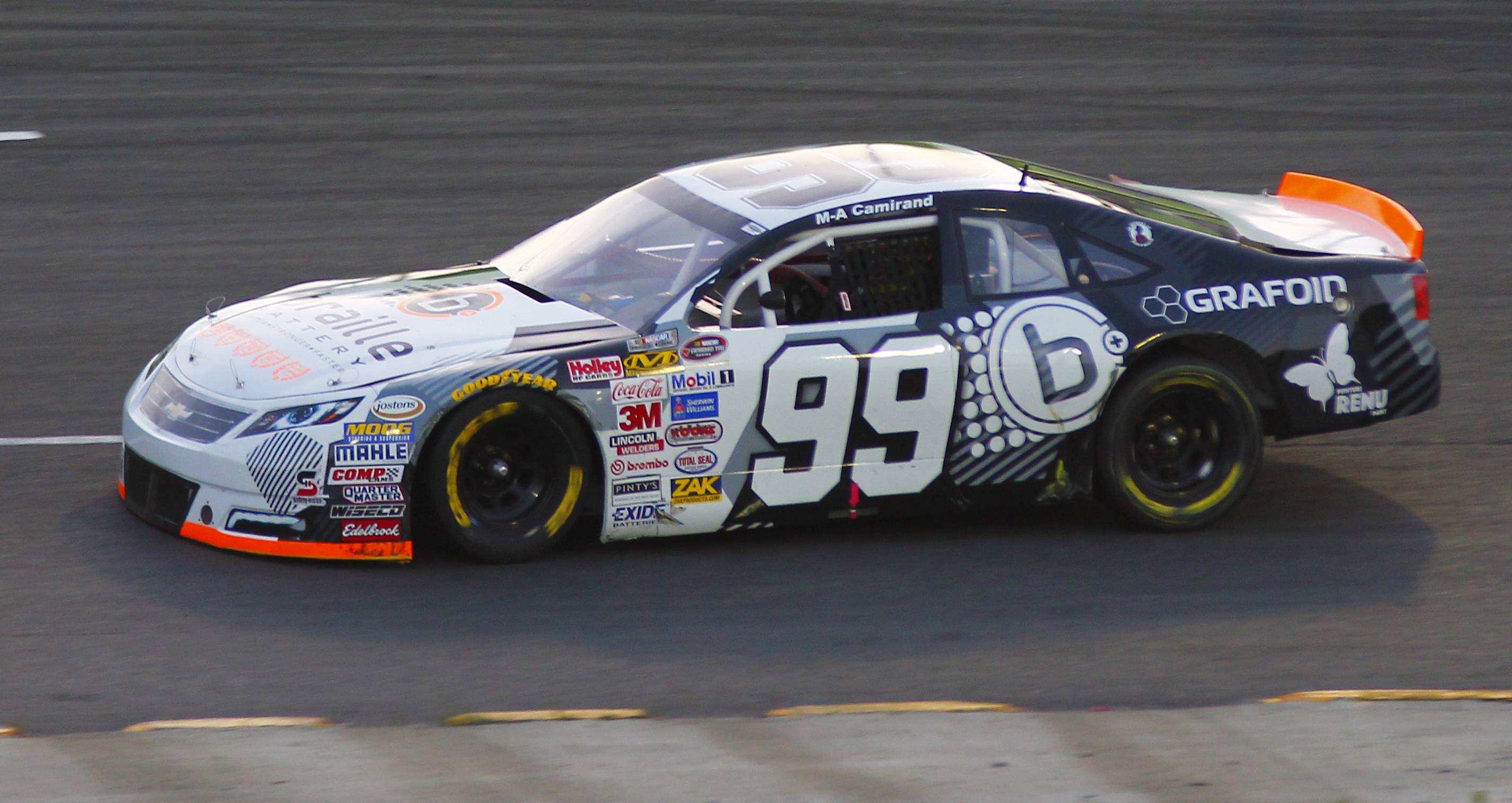
Marc-Antoine Camirand, pictured in 2015, won his fourth championship.

Marc-Antoine Camirand entered the season as the defending champion. In winning the 2026 championship, he became the first back to back to back champion in series history and is tied for the most championships in series history.

== Teams and drivers ==
=== Complete schedule ===
Manufacturer	Team	No.	Driver	Ref
Chevrolet	Ed Hakonson Racing	3	(Canada) Connor Bell (R) 6 (Note: Bell ran the full season split between the Ed Hakonson Racing No. 3 and No. 8 cars.)	
Chevrolet	Ed Hakonson Racing	3	(Canada) Alex Tagliani 8 (Note: Tagliani ran the full season split between the Ed Hakonson Racing No. 3 and the Theetge Motorsport No. 80 cars.)	
Chevrolet	Ed Hakonson Racing	8	(Canada) Dexter Stacey 2	
Chevrolet	Ed Hakonson Racing	8	(Canada) Connor Bell (R) 8	
Chevrolet	Ed Hakonson Racing	8	(Canada) Justin Arseneau 3	
Chevrolet	Ed Hakonson Racing	8	(Canada) Jonathan Woolridge (R) 1	
Chevrolet	Innovation Auto Sport	74	(Canada) Kevin Lacroix	
Chevrolet	Theetge Motorsports	80	(Canada) Alex Tagliani 6	
Chevrolet	Theetge Motorsports	80	(Canada) Donald Theetge 8	
Chevrolet	Paillé Course//Racing	96	(Canada) Marc-Antoine Camirand	
Dodge	DJK Racing	17	(Canada) D. J. Kennington	
Dodge	Dumoulin Compétition	47	(Canada) L. P. Dumoulin	
Dodge	Larry Jackson Racing	84	(Canada) Larry Jackson	

=== Partial schedule ===
Manufacturer	Team	No.	Driver	Rounds	Ref
Chevrolet	BC Race Cars	19	(Canada) Keith Bean (R)	1	
Chevrolet	Boissonneault Racing Team	16	(Canada) Nicolas Barrette (R)	13–14	
Chevrolet	Dumoulin Compétition	50	(Italy) Vittorio Ghirelli	10	
Chevrolet	Eighty8 Racing	88	(Canada) Simon Charbonneau	1, 7, 10–13	
Chevrolet	Fellows McGraw Racing	87	(Canada) Sam Fellows	1, 7, 10–13	
Chevrolet	Glenn Styres Racing	0	(Canada) Glenn Styres	1–3, 5–6, 11, 13	
Chevrolet	Glenn Styres Racing	0	(Canada) Jeff Lapcevich	7	
Chevrolet	Glenn Styres Racing with Velocity Race Cars and J.R. Motorsports	44	(Canada) J. R. Fitzpatrick	13	
Chevrolet	Glenn Styres Racing with Velocity Race Cars	76	(Canada) Cayden Lapcevich	13–14	
Chevrolet	Goulet Motorsports	83	(Canada) Martin Goulet Jr. (R)	2–3, 10, 12, 14	
Chevrolet	Innovation Auto Sport	9	(Canada) Mathieu Kingsbury	1–7, 10, 12–13	
Chevrolet	Innovation Auto Sport	27	(Canada) Andrew Ranger	1–7, 10–14	
Chevrolet	JASS Racing with XEMIS Racing	39	(Canada) Alex Guenette	1–7, 10–14	
Chevrolet	JASS Racing with XEMIS Racing	93	(Canada) Jacques Guenette Sr. (R)	1, 7, 10, 12	
Chevrolet	JASS Racing with XEMIS Racing	93	(Canada) Martin Goulet Jr. (R)	4–6	
Chevrolet	JASS Racing with XEMIS Racing	93	(Canada) Daniel Bois	11, 13	
Chevrolet	Larue Motorsports	45	(Canada) Will Larue	1–3, 5–6, 8–10, 13	
Chevrolet	LL Motorsports	36	(Canada) Alex Labbé	2–3, 5–6, 10	
Chevrolet	MBS Motorsports	22	(Canada) Kyle Steckly	1, 13–14	
Chevrolet	MBS Motorsports	69	(Canada) Domenic Scrivo	1, 5–14	
Chevrolet	MBS Motorsports	69	(Canada) Frédérik Ladouceur (R)	4	
Chevrolet	MRN Racing Inc.	10	(Canada) Rob Naismith (R)	2–6, 8–9, 12, 14	
Chevrolet	MRN Racing Inc.	10	(Canada) Trevor Hill (R)	11, 13	
Chevrolet	Promotive Racing	67	(Canada) David Thorndyke	1, 13	
Chevrolet	Theetge Motorsports	73	(Canada) Sylvain Ouellet (R)	1, 13	
Chevrolet	Theetge Motorsports	73	(Canada) Donald Theetge	10–11	
Chevrolet	Theetge Motorsports	94	(Canada) Sylvain Ouellet (R)	7, 10	
Dodge	BCM Motorsports	55	(Canada) Serge Bordeau	10, 12–13	
Dodge	BCM Motorsports	75	(Canada) Benoît Couture	7, 10, 12–13	
Dodge	DJK Racing	7	(Canada) Raphaël Lessard	10	
Dodge	Dumoulin Compétition	04	(Canada) J. F. Dumoulin	10	
Dodge	Herby Motorsports	53	(Canada) Herby Drescher	10, 12–13	
Dodge	Larry Jackson Racing	85	(Canada) Darryl Timmers	1, 7, 11	
Dodge	Larry Jackson Racing	85	(Canada) Herby Drescher	2–3	
Dodge	Larry Jackson Racing	85	(Canada) Howie Scannell Jr.	4–6, 8–9, 14	
Dodge	Larry Jackson Racing	99	(Canada) Matthew Scannell	13	
Dodge	Legendary Motorcar Company	6	(Canada) Peter Klutt	13	
Dodge	Legendary Motorcar Company	42	(Canada) Ryan Klutt	1, 13	
Dodge	Legendary Motorcar Company	71	(Canada) Gary Klutt	1, 7, 11, 13	
Dodge	SDV Autosport	37	(Canada) Simon Dion-Viens	2–3, 10, 12	
Ford	BC Race Cars	24	(United States) Josh Hurley (R)	1, 13	
Ford	BC Race Cars	24	(Canada) Jeff Cavanagh	7	
Ford	BC Race Cars	24	(United States) Jared Odrick (R)	10–12	
Ford	Johnson Motorsports	14	(Canada) Geoff Johnson	1, 7, 13	
Ford	Prolon Racing Team	1	(Canada) J. P. Bergeron	1, 7, 10, 12–13	
Chevrolet 4 Dodge 6	DJK Racing	28	(Canada) Brad Ranson (R)	1, 7, 11, 13	
Chevrolet 4 Dodge 6	DJK Racing	28	(Canada) Dexter Stacey	4	
Chevrolet 4 Dodge 6	DJK Racing	28	(Canada) Frédérik Ladouceur (R)	5–6, 14	
Chevrolet 4 Dodge 6	DJK Racing	28	(Canada) Matthew Shirley	8–9	
Chevrolet 4 Dodge 4	Coursol Performance	54	(Canada) Dave Coursol	1–3, 5–7, 10, 12	
Chevrolet 1 Ford 2	Tomlinson Motorsports	48	(Canada) Ron Tomlinson	1, 7, 13	
Ford 7 Chevrolet 2	Bray Autosport	98	(Canada) Malcolm Strachan	1, 7, 11, 13	
Ford 7 Chevrolet 2	Bray Autosport	98	(Canada) Herby Drescher	4–6	
Ford 7 Chevrolet 2	Bray Autosport	98	(Canada) Jamie Krzysik	8–9	
Ford 7 Chevrolet 2	Bray Autosport	98	(Canada) Brad Ranson (R)	14	
Ford 6 Dodge 1	RGR Motorsports	38	(United States) Tyler Gonzalez (R)	1, 11, 13	
Ford 6 Dodge 1	RGR Motorsports	38	(Canada) Mike Goudie	2–3, 5–6	
Ford 6 Dodge 1	RGR Motorsports	38	(Canada) Simon Dion-Viens	7	

== Schedule ==
On 19 December 2025, NASCAR announced the 2026 schedule, with 14 races across 4 provinces scheduled. The GP3R weekend will include qualifying races, much like the Daytona 500's duel races.

No.	Race title	Track	Location	Date
1	CarGurus 200	R Canadian Tire Motorsport Park	Bowmanville, Ontario	17 May
2	Bud Light 125	O Autodrome Chaudière	Vallée-Jonction, Quebec	7 June (Note: The Bud Light 125 and Michelob Ultra 125 were originally scheduled for Saturday, June 6, before being postponed to Sunday, June 7 due to weather.)
3	Michelob Ultra 125	O Autodrome Chaudière	Vallée-Jonction, Quebec	7 June
4	Pinty's 300	O Riverside International Speedway	Antigonish, Nova Scotia	27 June
5	XPN Burn-X 125	O Autodrome Montmagny	Montmagny, Quebec	4 July
6	Delta Electrolyte 150	O Autodrome Montmagny	Montmagny, Quebec	4 July
7	NAPA 150	R Calabogie Motorsports Park	Calabogie, Ontario	19 July
8	Dorman Products 150	O Edmonton International Raceway	Wetaskiwin, Alberta	25 July
9	Carlyle Tools 150	O Edmonton International Raceway	Wetaskiwin, Alberta	25 July
	Omnifab Sprints	R Circuit Trois-Rivières	Trois-Rivières, Quebec	8 August
10	Le Tours 45 CarGurus	R Circuit Trois-Rivières	Trois-Rivières, Quebec	9 August
11	Markham 125	R Markham Street Circuit	Markham, Ontario	15 August
12	NAPA 100	R Circuit ICAR	Mirabel, Quebec	29 August
13	WeatherTech 200	R Canadian Tire Motorsport Park	Bowmanville, Ontario	6 September
14	NTN BCA 200	O Delaware Speedway	Delaware, Ontario	12 September

== Results and standings ==
=== Races ===
No.	Race	Pole position	Most laps led	Winning driver	Manufacturer	No	Report
1	CarGurus 200	Gary Klutt	Gary Klutt	Gary Klutt	Dodge	71	Report
2	Bud Light 125	Marc-Antoine Camirand	Marc-Antoine Camirand	Marc-Antoine Camirand	Chevrolet	96	Report
3	Michelob Ultra 125	Marc-Antoine Camirand	Marc-Antoine Camirand	Marc-Antoine Camirand	Chevrolet	96	Report
4	Pinty's 300	Donald Theetge	Kevin Lacroix	Kevin Lacroix	Chevrolet	74	Report
5	XPN Burn-X 125	Marc-Antoine Camirand	Will Larue	Marc-Antoine Camirand	Chevrolet	96	Report
6	Delta Electrolyte 150	Will Larue	Marc-Antoine Camirand	Marc-Antoine Camirand	Chevrolet	96	Report
7	NAPA 150	Marc-Antoine Camirand	Alex Tagliani	Alex Tagliani	Chevrolet	80	Report
8	Dorman Products 150	Will Larue	Will Larue	Kevin Lacroix	Chevrolet	74	Report
9	Carlyle Tools 150	Marc-Antoine Camirand	Marc-Antoine Camirand	Marc-Antoine Camirand	Chevrolet	96	Report
	Omnifab Sprints	Marc-Antoine Camirand	Marc-Antoine Camirand	Marc-Antoine Camirand	Chevrolet	96	Report
	Omnifab Sprints	Kevin Lacroix	Kevin Lacroix	Kevin Lacroix	Chevrolet	74	Report
10	Le Tours 45 CarGurus	Kevin Lacroix	Marc-Antoine Camirand	Marc-Antoine Camirand	Chevrolet	96	Report
11	Markham 125	Marc-Antoine Camirand	Marc-Antoine Camirand	Marc-Antoine Camirand	Chevrolet	96	Report
12	NAPA 100	Alex Guenette	Alex Guenette	Alex Guenette	Chevrolet	39	Report
13	WeatherTech 200	Kyle Steckly	Andrew Ranger	Andrew Ranger	Chevrolet	27	Report
14	NTN BCA 200	Marc-Antoine Camirand	Donald Theetge	Donald Theetge	Chevrolet	80	Report

=== Drivers' championship ===
(key) Bold – Pole position awarded by time. Italics – Pole position set by final practice results, Owners' points, or heat race. ^{L} – Led race lap (1 point). * – Led most race laps (1 point). (R) - Rookie of the Year candidate.

Pos.	Driver	MSP	ACD	ACD	RIS	AMS	AMS	CMP	EIR	EIR	CTR	MAR	ICAR	MSP	DEL	Points
1	Marc-Antoine Camirand	10^{L}	1^{L*}	**1**^{L*}	4^{L}	**1**^{L}	1^{L*}	4^{L}	3	1^{L*}	1^{L*}	1^{L*}	3	2	4	621
2	L. P. Dumoulin	2^{L}	16	8	3	8	9	7	5	5	2	3	7	5	6	534
3	Kevin Lacroix	27	10	6	1^{L*}	3	2	10	1^{L}	3^{L}	26^{L}	18	4	12	2^{L}	508
4	D. J. Kennington	9	6	15	10	10	3	8	7	6^{L}	29	7	10	24^{L}	3^{L}	474
5	Andrew Ranger	19^{L}	5	7	7	4	6	3			4	2	2	1^{L*}	8	470
6	Connor Bell **(R)**	8	11	11	9	15	15	6	10	10	13	4	6	34	10^{L}	455
7	Alex Tagliani	24	17	17	11	7	8	1^{L*}	12	8	24	16	5	10	9	455
8	Larry Jackson	23	13	12	8	13	14	19	9	9	12	13	15	26	7	423
9	Alex Guenette	4	14	14	5	6	21	2			3	5	**1**^{L*}	4		412
10	Donald Theetge		2^{L}	2^{L}	2^{L}	5	5		4	2^{L}	7	11			1^{L*}	408
11	Will Larue **(R)**	18^{L}	3	3		2^{L*}	**4**^{L}		**2**^{L*}	**4**^{L}	18			9		342
12	Mathieu Kingsbury	20	7	5	6	11	11	15			20		9	16		333
13	Domenic Scrivo	16				17	16	25	13	13	30	15	16	20	11	292
14	Rob Naismith **(R)**		12	10	12	16	22		11	11			19		15	268
15	Dave Coursol	11	15	9		9	10	26			11		12			249
16	Martin Goulet Jr. **(R)**		8	19	14	20	20				19		14		16	222
17	Herby Drescher		20	20	17	22	19				27		17	32		178
18	Alex Labbé		4	4		19	7				23			PR		167
19	Glenn Styres	25	18	13		14	13					22		38		165
20	Howie Scannell Jr.				16	21	17		14	14					18	164
21	Gary Klutt	**1**^{L*}						5				6		6		163
22	Simon Charbonneau	12						28			14	19	11	19		161
23	Simon Dion-Viens		9	18				17			8		13			155
24	Sam Fellows	17						9			28	21	24	18		147
25	Brad Ranson **(R)**	31						16				12		17	12	132
26	J. P. Bergeron	6						24			25		8	27		130
27	Frédérik Ladouceur **(R)**				15	12	12								17	120
28	Kyle Steckly	3^{L}												**11**^{L}	5	115
29	Mike Goudie		19	16		18	18									105
30	Darryl Timmers	7						12				10				103
31	Justin Arseneau										6		18	8		100
32	Jacques Guenette Sr. **(R)**	21						20			15		21	QL		99
33	Malcolm Strachan	29						11				9		36		91
34	Sylvain Ouellet **(R)**	26						23			17			21		89
35	Benoît Couture							21			16		22	30		87
36	Dexter Stacey	13			13			27								79
37	Jamie Krzysik								6	7						75
38	Jared Odrick **(R)**										22	14	23	QL		73
39	Cayden Lapcevich													3	13	72
40	Matthew Shirley								8	12						68
41	Ron Tomlinson **(R)**	14						22						28		68
42	Daniel Bois											8		14		66
43	Geoff Johnson **(R)**	28						18						22		64
44	Serge Bordeau										21		20	29		62
45	Josh Hurley **(R)**	15^{L}												15		59
46	Nicholas Barrette **(R)**													23	14	51
47	Ryan Klutt	5												35		48
48	Tyler Gonzalez **(R)**	30										23		37^{L}		43
49	Raphaël Lessard										5					39
50	Trevor Hill **(R)**											20		31		37
51	J. R. Fitzpatrick													7		37
52	Vittorio Ghirelli										10					35
53	J. F. Dumoulin										9					35
54	David Thorndyke	22												33		33
55	Jeff Cavanagh							13								31
56	Peter Klutt													13		31
57	Jeff Lapcevich							14								30
58	Jonathan Woolridge **(R)**											17				27
59	Matthew Scannell													25		19
60	Keith Bean **(R)**	32														12

== See also ==
- 2026 NASCAR Cup Series
- 2026 NASCAR O'Reilly Auto Parts Series
- 2026 NASCAR Craftsman Truck Series
- 2026 ARCA Menards Series
- 2026 ARCA Menards Series East
- 2026 ARCA Menards Series West
- 2026 NASCAR Whelen Modified Tour
- 2026 NASCAR Euro Series
- 2026 NASCAR Brasil Series
- 2026 CARS Tour
- 2026 SMART Modified Tour
- 2026 ASA STARS National Tour
