= Le Tours 45 CarGurus =

NASCAR Canada Series races in Trois-Rivières, Quebec

NASCAR Canada Series
- Venue: Circuit Trois-Rivières
- Location: Trois-Rivières, Quebec
- First race: 2007
- Laps: 45
- Previous names: GP3R 100 (2007–2011); JuliaWine.com 100 (2012–2013); JuliaWine.com Le 50 Tours (2014–2015); Can-Am Le 50 Tours (2016–2017); Le 50 Tours Can-Am (2018); Les 50 Tours Hotel Le Concorde (2019); Guardian Angels 60 (2021); Les 60 Tours Rousseau Métal (2022–2025)

Circuit information
- Turns: 11

The Le Tours 45 CarGurus is a NASCAR Canada Series race held annually at the Circuit Trois-Rivières in Trois-Rivières, Quebec, Canada since the Canada Series' inaugural season in 2007, and is often considered the Crown Jewel of the Canada Series. Marc-Antoine Camirand is the defending winner, having won it in 2026.

== Past winners ==
Year	Date	Driver	Team	Car	Distance/Duration	Report	Ref
2007	Sept 4	(Canada) Kerry Micks	Beyond Digital Imaging	Ford	41 Laps	Report	
2008	Aug 17	(Canada) Andrew Ranger	Wal-Mart / Tide	Ford	46 Laps	Report	
2009	Aug 17	(Canada) Andrew Ranger	Wal-Mart / Tide	Ford	43 Laps	Report	
2010	Aug 15	(Canada) Andrew Ranger	Dodge Dealers of Quebec	Dodge	42 Laps	Report	
2011	Aug 7	(Canada) Robin Buck	Quaker State/Durabody	Dodge	44 Laps	Report	
2012	Aug 7	(Canada) Andrew Ranger	Dodge/GC Motorsports	Dodge	44 Laps	Report	
2013	Aug 11	(Canada) D. J. Kennington	Castrol Edge/Mahindra Tractors	Dodge	46 Laps	Report	
2014	Aug 10	(Canada) L.P. Dumoulin	WeatherTech Canada/Bellemare	Dodge	51 Laps	Report	
2015	Aug 2	(Canada) Kevin Lacroix	Lacroix Tuning/Excellence Chrysler	Dodge	50 Laps	Report	
2016	Aug 14	(Canada) Kevin Lacroix	Bumper to Bumper/Total/Go Fast	Dodge	50 Laps	Report	
2017	Aug 13	(Canada) Alex Tagliani	Epipen/Lowe's/St. Hubert/Fast Wheels	Dodge	54 Laps	Report	
2018	Aug 12	(Canada) Alex Tagliani	Epipen/Rona/St. Hubert/Spectra Premium	Chevrolet	50 Laps	Report	
2019	Aug 11	(Canada) L.P. Dumoulin	WeatherTech/Bellemare/Eibach	Dodge	50 Laps	Report	
2020 | Not Held
2021	Aug 15	(Canada) Alex Tagliani	RONA / Viagra / St. Hubert	Chevrolet	60 Laps	Report	
2022	Aug 7	(Canada) Alex Guenette	Motos Illimitees / DLGL	Ford	64 Laps	Report	
2023	Aug 6	(Canada) Marc-Antoine Camirand	GM Paille / Chevrolet Canada	Chevrolet	60 Laps	Report	
2024	Aug 11	(Canada) Marc-Antoine Camirand	GM Paille / Chevrolet Canada	Chevrolet	72 Laps	Report	
2025	Aug 10	(Canada) Andrew Ranger	GM Paille / Chevrolet Canada	Chevrolet	63 Laps	Report	
2026	Aug 9	(Canada) Marc-Antoine Camirand	Paillé Course//Racing	Chevrolet	45 Laps	Report	

== Sprints ==
Omnifab Sprints
NASCAR Canada Series
- Venue: Circuit Trois-Rivières
- Location: Trois-Rivières, Quebec
- First race: 2026
- Laps: 15 (each)

The Omnifab Sprints are a pair of qualifying races held on the day before the Le Tours 45 CarGurus, the races are contested over 15 laps and are inspired by the Daytona Duels, which are held before the Daytona 500.

=== Past winners ===
Year	Date	Driver	Team	Car	Distance/Duration	Report	Ref
2026	Aug 8	(Canada) Marc-Antoine Camirand	Paillé Course//Racing	Chevrolet	15 laps	Report	
2026	Aug 8	(Canada) Kevin Lacroix	Innovation Auto Sport	Chevrolet	15 laps	Report	

Previous race: Dorman Products 150/Carlyle Tools 150	NASCAR Canada Series; Le Tours 45 CarGurus (points); Omnifab Sprints (exhibition)	Next race: Markham 125
