= 2026 XPN Burn-X 125 =

5th race of the 2026 NASCAR Canada Series

Race details
- Race 5 of 14 in the 2026 NASCAR Canada Series season
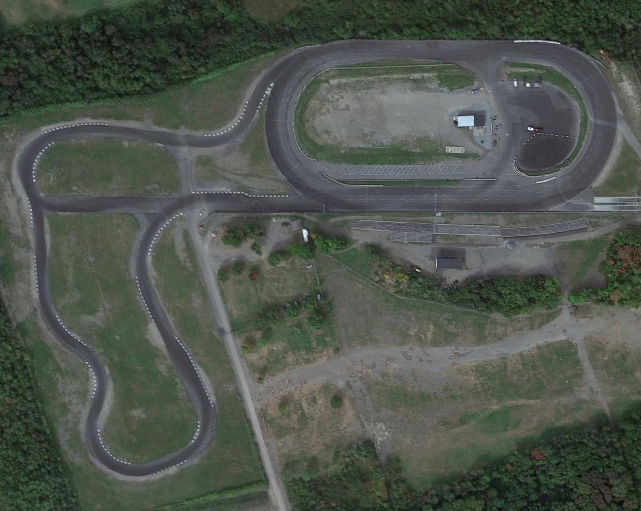
- Location: Autodrome Montmagny in Montmagny, Quebec, Canada
- Course: Oval
- Course length: 0.375 miles (0.604 km)
- Distance: 126 laps, 47.25 mi (76.04 km)
- Scheduled distance: 125 laps, 46.875 mi (75.438 km)
- Average speed: 75.571 miles per hour (121.620 km/h)

Pole position
Driver	Marc-Antoine Camirand	Paillé Course//Racing
- Time: 17.864

Most laps led
Driver	Will Larue	Larue Motorsports
- Laps: 94

Winner
No. 96	Marc-Antoine Camirand	Paillé Course//Racing

Television in the United States
- Network: REV TV on YouTube

The 2026 XPN Burn-X 125 was the fifth stock car race of the 2026 NASCAR Canada Series. The race was held on Saturday, July 4, on Autodrome Montmagny's 0.375 mi (0.604 km) oval shaped racetrack in Montmagny, Quebec, Canada and was the first race of a doubleheader. The race went a lap beyond the scheduled 125-lap distance due to overtime, where Marc-Antoine Camirand held off Will Larue to score the win. Larue finished in second and Kevin Lacroix rounded out the podium in third. The race marked the 200th career start for fourth-place finisher Andrew Ranger.

== Report ==
=== Background ===
The Autodrome Montmagny is a multi-track motorsport venue located in Montmagny (Canada), approximately 80 km (50 mi) east of Quebec City. The facility features a 0.375 mi (0.604 km) oval track, a 2.000 km (1.243 mi) road course and a dragstrip.

==== Entry list ====
- (R) denotes rookie driver.
- (i) denotes driver who is ineligible for series driver points.

#	Driver	Team	Make
0	Glenn Styres	Glenn Styres Racing	Chevrolet
3	Alex Tagliani	Ed Hakonson Racing	Chevrolet
8	Connor Bell (R)	Ed Hakonson Racing	Chevrolet
9	Mathieu Kingsbury	Innovation Auto Sport	Chevrolet
10	Rob Naismith (R)	MRN Racing Inc.	Chevrolet
17	D. J. Kennington	DJK Racing	Dodge
27	Andrew Ranger	Innovation Auto Sport	Chevrolet
28	Frédérik Ladouceur (R)	DJK Racing	Dodge
36	Alex Labbé	LL Motorsports	Chevrolet
38	Mike Goudie	RGR Motorsports	Ford
39	Alex Guenette	JASS Racing with XEMIS Racing	Chevrolet
45	William Larue	Larue Motorsports	Chevrolet
47	L. P. Dumoulin	Dumoulin Compétition	Dodge
54	Dave Coursol	Coursol Performance	Chevrolet
69	Domenic Scrivo	MBS Motorsports	Chevrolet
74	Kevin Lacroix	Innovation Auto Sport	Chevrolet
80	Donald Theetge	Theetge Motorsports	Chevrolet
84	Larry Jackson	Larry Jackson Racing	Dodge
85	Howie Scannell Jr.	Larry Jackson Racing	Dodge
93	Martin Goulet Jr. (R)	JASS Racing with XEMIS Racing	Chevrolet
96	Marc-Antoine Camirand	Paillé Course//Racing	Chevrolet
98	Herby Drescher	Bray Autosport	Ford

== Practice ==
The first of two practice sessions was held on Saturday, July 4, at 11:20 AM EST. The second of two practice sessions was held on Saturday, July 4, at 12:55 PM EST. Mathieu Kingsbury was the fastest overall with a best lap of 18.117 seconds and a speed of 74.516 mph (119.922 km/h).

Pos.	#	Driver	Team	Make	Time	Speed
1	9	Mathieu Kingsbury	Innovation Auto Sport	Chevrolet	18.117	74.516
2	39	Alex Guenette	JASS Racing with XEMIS Racing	Chevrolet	18.177	74.270
3	45	Will Larue (R)	Larue Motorsports	Chevrolet	18.244	73.997
Full practice results

== Qualifying ==
Qualifying was held on Saturday, July 4, at 4:20 PM EST. Marc-Antoine Camirand, driving for Paillé Course//Racing, would win the pole with a lap of 17.864 seconds and a speed of 75.571 mph (121.620 km/h).

Pos.	#	Driver	Team	Make	Time	Speed
1	96	Marc-Antoine Camirand	Paillé Course//Racing	Chevrolet	17.864	75.571
2	45	Will Larue (R)	Larue Motorsports	Chevrolet	17.884	75.486
3	80	Donald Theetge	Theetge Motorsports	Chevrolet	17.890	75.461
4	36	Alex Labbé	LL Motorsports	Chevrolet	17.915	75.356
5	74	Kevin Lacroix	Innovation Auto Sport	Chevrolet	17.916	75.352
6	3	Alex Tagliani	Ed Hakonson Racing	Chevrolet	17.975	75.104
7	39	Alex Guenette	JASS Racing with XEMIS Racing	Chevrolet	18.009	74.963
8	54	Dave Coursol	Coursol Performance	Chevrolet	18.057	74.763
9	93	Martin Goulet Jr. (R)	JASS Racing with XEMIS Racing	Chevrolet	18.092	74.619
10	28	Frédérik Ladouceur (R)	DJK Racing	Dodge	18.102	74.577
11	17	D. J. Kennington	DJK Racing	Dodge	18.115	74.524
12	47	L. P. Dumoulin	Dumoulin Compétition	Dodge	18.127	74.475
13	27	Andrew Ranger	Innovation Auto Sport	Chevrolet	18.182	74.249
14	8	Connor Bell (R)	Ed Hakonson Racing	Chevrolet	18.227	74.066
15	9	Mathieu Kingsbury	Innovation Auto Sport	Chevrolet	18.250	73.973
16	10	Rob Naismith (R)	MRN Racing Inc.	Chevrolet	18.260	73.932
17	0	Glenn Styres	Glenn Styres Racing	Chevrolet	18.325	73.670
18	84	Larry Jackson	Larry Jackson Racing	Dodge	18.409	73.334
19	38	Michael Goudie	RGR Motorsports	Ford	18.632	72.456
20	69	Domenic Scrivo	MBS Motorsports	Chevrolet	18.636	72.440
21	85	Howie Scannell Jr.	Larry Jackson Racing	Dodge	18.984	71.113
22	98	Herby Drescher	Bray Autosport	Ford	19.173	70.412
Full qualifying results

== Race results ==
Pos	St	#	Driver	Team	Manufacturer	Laps	Led	Status	Points
1	1	96	Marc-Antoine Camirand	Paillé Course//Racing	Chevrolet	126	32	Running	47
2	2	45	Will Larue (R)	Larue Motorsports	Chevrolet	126	94	Running	44
3	5	74	Kevin Lacroix	Innovation Auto Sport	Chevrolet	126	0	Running	41
4	13	27	Andrew Ranger	Innovation Auto Sport	Chevrolet	126	0	Running	40
5	3	80	Donald Theetge	Theetge Motorsports	Chevrolet	126	0	Running	39
6	7	39	Alex Guenette	JASS Racing with XEMIS Racing	Chevrolet	126	0	Running	38
7	6	3	Alex Tagliani	Ed Hakonson Racing	Chevrolet	126	0	Running	37
8	12	47	L. P. Dumoulin	Dumoulin Compétition	Dodge	126	0	Running	36
9	8	54	Dave Coursol	Coursol Performance	Chevrolet	126	0	Running	35
10	11	17	D. J. Kennington	DJK Racing	Dodge	126	0	Running	34
11	15	9	Mathieu Kingsbury	Innovation Auto Sport	Chevrolet	125	0	Running	33
12	10	28	Frédérik Ladouceur (R)	DJK Racing	Dodge	125	0	Running	32
13	18	84	Larry Jackson	Larry Jackson Racing	Dodge	125	0	Running	31
14	17	0	Glenn Styres	Glenn Styres Racing	Chevrolet	124	0	Running	30
15	14	8	Connor Bell (R)	Ed Hakonson Racing	Chevrolet	123	0	Running	29
16	16	10	Rob Naismith (R)	MRN Racing Inc.	Chevrolet	122	0	Running	28
17	20	69	Domenic Scrivo	MBS Motorsports	Chevrolet	122	0	Running	27
18	19	38	Michael Goudie	RGR Motorsports	Ford	120	0	Running	26
19	4	36	Alex Labbé	LL Motorsports	Chevrolet	112	0	Running	25
20	9	93	Martin Goulet Jr. (R)	JASS Racing with XEMIS Racing	Chevrolet	102	0	Running	24
21	21	85	Howie Scannell Jr.	Larry Jackson Racing	Dodge	27	0	Mechanical	23
22	22	98	Herby Drescher	Bray Autosport	Ford	0	0	Did Not Start	22

== Standings after the race ==
	Pos	Driver	Points
	1	Marc-Antoine Camirand	219
	2	L. P. Dumoulin	184 (–35)
1	3	Andrew Ranger	179 (–40)
2	4	Kevin Lacroix	178 (–41)
2	5	Alex Guenette	177 (–42)
1	6	Mathieu Kingsbury	171 (–48)
1	7	D. J. Kennington	170 (–49)
1	8	Donald Theetge	168 (–51)
2	9	Connor Bell	166 (–53)
1	10	Will Larue	153 (–66)

Previous race: 2026 Pinty's 300	NASCAR Canada Series; 2026 season	Next race: 2026 Delta Electrolyte 150
