= 2026 NAPA 100 =

12th race of the 2026 NASCAR Canada Series

Race details
- Race 12 of 14 in the 2026 NASCAR Canada Series season
- Date: August 29, 2026
- Location: Circuit ICAR in Mirabel, Quebec, Canada
- Course: Permanent racing facility
- Course length: 1.426 miles (2.295 km)
- Distance: 43 laps, 61.318 mi (98.685 km)
- Average speed: 71.231 miles per hour (114.635 km/h)

Pole position
Driver	Alex Guenette	JASS Racing with XEMIS Racing
- Time: 1:04.761

Most laps led
Driver	Alex Guenette	JASS Racing with XEMIS Racing
- Laps: 43

Winner
No. 39	Alex Guenette	JASS Racing with XEMIS Racing

Television in the United States
- Network: REV TV on YouTube

The 2026 NAPA 100 was the twelfth stock car race of the 2026 NASCAR Canada Series. The race was held on Saturday, August 29, 2026, at Circuit ICAR in Mirabel, Quebec, Canada. The race will took place on the 1.426 mi (2.295 km) road course layout. Polesitter Alex Guenette would lead the entire race and score his first win of the season and his first since 2022. Andrew Ranger finished in second and Marc-Antoine Camirand rounded out the podium in third.

== Report ==
=== Background ===
The International Center of Advanced Racing (Circuit ICAR) is a multi-track facility located on the former runways at Montréal–Mirabel International Airport, in Mirabel, Quebec, Canada north of Montreal. The facility features a 2.125 mi (3.420 km), 16-turn road course, a 0.400 mi (0.644 km) oval, a 0.250 mi (0.402 km) drag strip, two kart tracks, a driftpark and an offroad course.

==== Entry list ====
- (R) denotes rookie driver.
- (i) denotes driver who is ineligible for series driver points.

#	Driver	Team	Make
1	Jean-Philippe Bergeron	Prolon Racing Team	Ford
3	Connor Bell (R)	Ed Hakonson Racing	Chevrolet
8	Justin Arseneau	Ed Hakonson Racing	Chevrolet
9	Mathieu Kingsbury	Innovation Auto Sport	Chevrolet
10	Rob Naismith (R)	MRN Racing Inc.	Chevrolet
17	D. J. Kennington	DJK Racing	Dodge
24	Jared Odrick (R)	BC Race Cars	Ford
27	Andrew Ranger	Innovation Auto Sport	Chevrolet
37	Simon Dion-Viens	SDV Autosport	Dodge
39	Alex Guenette	JASS Racing with XEMIS Racing	Chevrolet
47	L. P. Dumoulin	Dumoulin Compétition	Dodge
53	Herby Drescher	Herby Motorsports	Dodge
54	Dave Coursol	Coursol Performance	Dodge
55	Serge Bordeau	BCM Motorsports	Dodge
69	Domenic Scrivo	MBS Motorsports	Chevrolet
74	Kevin Lacroix	Innovation Auto Sport	Chevrolet
75	Benoît Couture	BCM Motorsports	Dodge
80	Alex Tagliani	Theetge Motorsports	Chevrolet
83	Martin Goulet Jr.	Goulet Motorsports	Chevrolet
84	Larry Jackson	Larry Jackson Racing	Dodge
87	Sam Fellows	Fellows McGraw Racing	Chevrolet
88	Simon Charbonneau	Eighty8 Racing	Chevrolet
93	Jacques Guenette Sr. (R)	JASS Racing with XEMIS Racing	Chevrolet
96	Marc-Antoine Camirand	Paillé Course//Racing	Chevrolet

== Practice ==
Practice was held on Saturday, August 29, at 10:15 AM EST. Alex Guenette set the fastest time with a lap of 1:05.136 and a speed of 78.814 mph (126.839 km/h).

Pos.	#	Driver	Team	Make	Time	Speed
1	39	Alex Guenette	JASS Racing with XEMIS Racing	Chevrolet	1:05.136	78.814
2	96	Marc-Antoine Camirand	Paillé Course//Racing	Chevrolet	1:05.166	78.777
3	74	Kevin Lacroix	Innovation Auto Sport	Chevrolet	1:05.483	78.396
Full practice results

== Qualifying ==
Qualifying was held on Saturday, August 29, at 1:20 PM EST. Alex Guenette, driving for JASS Racing with XEMIS Racing, would win the pole with a lap of 1:04.761 and a speed of 79.270 mph (127.573 km/h).

Pos.	#	Driver	Team	Make	Time	Speed
1	39	Alex Guenette	JASS Racing with XEMIS Racing	Chevrolet	1:04.761	79.270
2	74	Kevin Lacroix	Innovation Auto Sport	Chevrolet	1:05.252	78.673
3	80	Alex Tagliani	Theetge Motorsports	Chevrolet	1:05.271	78.651
4	27	Andrew Ranger	Innovation Auto Sport	Chevrolet	1:05.319	78.593
5	47	L. P. Dumoulin	Dumoulin Compétition	Dodge	1:05.355	78.549
6	96	Marc-Antoine Camirand	Paillé Course//Racing	Chevrolet	1:05.521	78.350
7	8	Justin Arseneau	Ed Hakonson Racing	Chevrolet	1:05.557	78.307
8	9	Mathieu Kingsbury	Innovation Auto Sport	Chevrolet	1:06.197	77.550
9	1	J. P. Bergeron	Prolon Racing Team	Ford	1:06.382	77.334
10	88	Simon Charbonneau	Eighty8 Racing	Chevrolet	1:06.513	77.182
11	17	D. J. Kennington	DJK Racing	Dodge	1:06.558	77.130
12	87	Sam Fellows	Fellows McGraw Racing	Chevrolet	1:06.798	76.853
13	3	Connor Bell (R)	Ed Hakonson Racing	Chevrolet	1:06.848	76.795
14	54	Dave Coursol	Coursol Performance	Dodge	1:07.121	76.483
15	24	Jared Odrick (R)	BC Race Cars	Ford	1:07.142	76.459
16	37	Simon Dion-Viens	SDV Autosport	Dodge	1:07.476	76.080
17	84	Larry Jackson	Larry Jackson Racing	Dodge	1:07.726	75.800
18	83	Martin Goulet Jr.	Goulet Motorsports	Chevrolet	1:07.889	75.618
19	55	Serge Bordeau	BCM Motorsports	Dodge	1:09.944	73.396
20	69	Domenic Scrivo	MBS Motorsports	Chevrolet	1:10.190	73.139
21	75	Ben Couture	BCM Motorsports	Dodge	1:10.627	72.686
22	10	Rob Naismith (R)	MRN Racing Inc.	Chevrolet	1:11.764	71.534
23	93	Jacques Guenette Sr. (R)	JASS Racing with XEMIS Racing	Chevrolet	1:12.306	70.998
24	53	Herby Drescher	Herby Motorsports	Dodge	–	–

== Race results ==
Pos	St	#	Driver	Team	Manufacturer	Laps	Led	Status	Points
1	1	39	Alex Guenette	JASS Racing with XEMIS Racing	Chevrolet	43	43	Running	48
2	4	27	Andrew Ranger	Innovation Auto Sport	Chevrolet	43	0	Running	42
3	6	96	Marc-Antoine Camirand	Paillé Course//Racing	Chevrolet	43	0	Running	41
4	2	74	Kevin Lacroix	Innovation Auto Sport	Chevrolet	43	0	Running	40
5	3	80	Alex Tagliani	Theetge Motorsports	Chevrolet	43	0	Running	39
6	13	3	Connor Bell (R)	Ed Hakonson Racing	Chevrolet	43	0	Running	38
7	5	47	L. P. Dumoulin	Dumoulin Compétition	Dodge	43	0	Running	37
8	9	1	J. P. Bergeron	Prolon Racing Team	Ford	43	0	Running	36
9	8	9	Mathieu Kingsbury	Innovation Auto Sport	Chevrolet	43	0	Running	35
10	11	17	D. J. Kennington	DJK Racing	Dodge	43	0	Running	34
11	10	88	Simon Charbonneau	Eighty8 Racing	Chevrolet	43	0	Running	33
12	14	54	Dave Coursol	Coursol Performance	Dodge	43	0	Running	32
13	21	37	Simon Dion-Viens	SDV Autosport	Dodge	43	0	Running	31
14	20	83	Martin Goulet Jr. (R)	Goulet Motorsports	Chevrolet	43	0	Running	30
15	16	84	Larry Jackson	Larry Jackson Racing	Dodge	43	0	Running	29
16	18	69	Domenic Scrivo	MBS Motorsports	Chevrolet	42	0	Running	28
17	24	53	Herby Drescher	Herby Motorsports	Dodge	42	0	Running	27
18	7	8	Justin Arseneau	Ed Hakonson Racing	Chevrolet	42	0	Running	26
19	17	10	Rob Naismith (R)	MRN Racing Inc.	Chevrolet	41	0	Running	25
20	22	55	Serge Bordeau	BCM Motorsports	Dodge	40	0	Running	24
21	19	93	Jacques Guenette Sr. (R)	JASS Racing with XEMIS Racing	Chevrolet	37	0	Running	23
22	23	75	Benoît Couture	BCM Motorsports	Dodge	24	0	Power Steering	22
23	15	24	Jared Odrick (R)	BC Race Cars	Ford	23	0	Axle	21
24	12	87	Sam Fellows	Fellows McGraw Racing	Chevrolet	18	0	Transmission	20

== Standings after the race ==
	Pos	Driver	Points
	1	Marc-Antoine Camirand	539
	2	L. P. Dumoulin	457 (–82)
	3	Kevin Lacroix	433 (–106)
	4	D. J. Kennington	411 (–128)
	5	Connor Bell	410 (–129)
1	6	Alex Tagliani	386 (–153)
1	7	Andrew Ranger	386 (–153)
2	8	Alex Guenette	372 (–167)
	9	Larry Jackson	368 (–171)
4	10	Donald Theetge	360 (–179)

Previous race: 2026 Markham 125	NASCAR Canada Series; 2026 season	Next race: 2026 WeatherTech 200
