= 2026 Delta Electrolyte 150 =

6th race of the 2026 NASCAR Canada Series

Race details
- Race 6 of 14 in the 2026 NASCAR Canada Series season
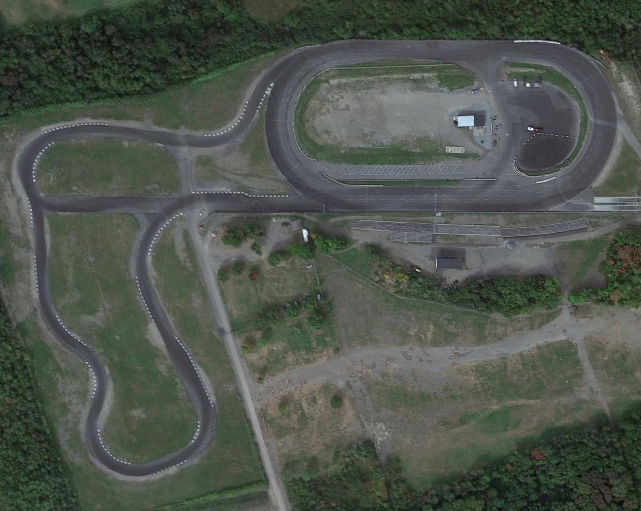
- Location: Autodrome Montmagny in Montmagny, Quebec, Canada
- Course: Oval
- Course length: 0.375 miles (0.604 km)
- Distance: 150 laps, 56.25 mi (90.53 km)
- Average speed: 62.021 miles per hour (99.813 km/h)

Pole position
Driver	Will Larue	Larue Motorsports
- Time: 18.022

Most laps led
Driver	Marc-Antoine Camirand	Paillé Course//Racing
- Laps: 137

Winner
No. 96	Marc-Antoine Camirand	Paillé Course//Racing

Television in the United States
- Network: REV TV on YouTube

The 2026 Delta Electrolyte 150 was the sixth stock car race of the 2026 NASCAR Canada Series. The race was held on Saturday, July 4, on Autodrome Montmagny's 0.375 mi (0.604 km) oval shaped racetrack in Montmagny, Quebec, Canada and was the second race of a doubleheader. After taking the lead from polesitter Will Larue on the first restart of the race, Marc-Antoine Camirand would lead for the remainder of the event, scoring the win and sweeping the doubleheader. Kevin Lacroix finished in second and D. J. Kennington rounded out the podium in third.

== Report ==
=== Background ===
The Autodrome Montmagny is a multi-track motorsport venue located in Montmagny (Canada), approximately 80 km (50 mi) east of Quebec City. The facility features a 0.375 mi (0.604 km) oval track, a 2.000 km (1.243 mi) road course and a dragstrip.

==== Entry list ====
- (R) denotes rookie driver.
- (i) denotes driver who is ineligible for series driver points.

#	Driver	Team	Make
0	Glenn Styres	Glenn Styres Racing	Chevrolet
3	Alex Tagliani	Ed Hakonson Racing	Chevrolet
8	Connor Bell (R)	Ed Hakonson Racing	Chevrolet
9	Mathieu Kingsbury	Innovation Auto Sport	Chevrolet
10	Rob Naismith (R)	MRN Racing Inc.	Chevrolet
17	D. J. Kennington	DJK Racing	Dodge
27	Andrew Ranger	Innovation Auto Sport	Chevrolet
28	Frédérik Ladouceur (R)	DJK Racing	Dodge
36	Alex Labbé	LL Motorsports	Chevrolet
38	Mike Goudie	RGR Motorsports	Ford
39	Alex Guenette	JASS Racing with XEMIS Racing	Chevrolet
45	William Larue	Larue Motorsports	Chevrolet
47	L. P. Dumoulin	Dumoulin Compétition	Dodge
54	Dave Coursol	Coursol Performance	Chevrolet
69	Domenic Scrivo	MBS Motorsports	Chevrolet
74	Kevin Lacroix	Innovation Auto Sport	Chevrolet
80	Donald Theetge	Theetge Motorsports	Chevrolet
84	Larry Jackson	Larry Jackson Racing	Dodge
85	Howie Scannell Jr.	Larry Jackson Racing	Dodge
93	Martin Goulet Jr. (R)	JASS Racing with XEMIS Racing	Chevrolet
96	Marc-Antoine Camirand	Paillé Course//Racing	Chevrolet
98	Herby Drescher	Bray Autosport	Ford

== Practice ==
The first of two practice sessions was held on Saturday, July 4, at 11:20 AM EST. The second of two practice sessions was held on Saturday, July 4, at 12:55 PM EST. Mathieu Kingsbury was the fastest overall with a best lap of 18.117 seconds and a speed of 74.516 mph (119.922 km/h).

Pos.	#	Driver	Team	Make	Time	Speed
1	9	Mathieu Kingsbury	Innovation Auto Sport	Chevrolet	18.117	74.516
2	39	Alex Guenette	JASS Racing with XEMIS Racing	Chevrolet	18.177	74.270
3	45	Will Larue (R)	Larue Motorsports	Chevrolet	18.244	73.997
Full practice results

== Qualifying ==
=== Starting lineup ===
Pos.	#	Driver	Team	Make
1	45	Will Larue (R)	Larue Motorsports	Chevrolet
2	96	Marc-Antoine Camirand	Paillé Course//Racing	Chevrolet
3	80	Donald Theetge	Theetge Motorsports	Chevrolet
4	36	Alex Labbé	LL Motorsports	Chevrolet
5	74	Kevin Lacroix	Innovation Auto Sport	Chevrolet
6	39	Alex Guenette	JASS Racing with XEMIS Racing	Chevrolet
7	3	Alex Tagliani	Ed Hakonson Racing	Chevrolet
8	54	Dave Coursol	Coursol Performance	Chevrolet
9	93	Martin Goulet Jr. (R)	JASS Racing with XEMIS Racing	Chevrolet
10	47	L. P. Dumoulin	Dumoulin Compétition	Dodge
11	17	D. J. Kennington	DJK Racing	Dodge
12	27	Andrew Ranger	Innovation Auto Sport	Chevrolet
13	9	Mathieu Kingsbury	Innovation Auto Sport	Chevrolet
14	28	Frédérik Ladouceur (R)	DJK Racing	Dodge
15	8	Connor Bell (R)	Ed Hakonson Racing	Chevrolet
16	84	Larry Jackson	Larry Jackson Racing	Dodge
17	10	Rob Naismith (R)	MRN Racing Inc.	Chevrolet
18	0	Glenn Styres	Glenn Styres Racing	Chevrolet
19	69	Domenic Scrivo	MBS Motorsports	Chevrolet
20	38	Michael Goudie	RGR Motorsports	Ford
21	85	Howie Scannell Jr.	Larry Jackson Racing	Dodge
22	98	Herby Drescher	Bray Autosport	Ford

== Race results ==
Pos	St	#	Driver	Team	Manufacturer	Laps	Led	Status	Points
1	2	96	Marc-Antoine Camirand	Paillé Course//Racing	Chevrolet	150	137	Running	48
2	5	74	Kevin Lacroix	Innovation Auto Sport	Chevrolet	150	0	Running	42
3	11	17	D. J. Kennington	DJK Racing	Dodge	150	0	Running	41
4	1	45	Will Larue (R)	Larue Motorsports	Chevrolet	149	13	Running	41
5	3	80	Donald Theetge	Theetge Motorsports	Chevrolet	149	0	Running	39
6	12	27	Andrew Ranger	Innovation Auto Sport	Chevrolet	149	0	Running	38
7	4	36	Alex Labbé	LL Motorsports	Chevrolet	149	0	Running	37
8	7	3	Alex Tagliani	Ed Hakonson Racing	Chevrolet	149	0	Running	36
9	10	47	L. P. Dumoulin	Dumoulin Compétition	Dodge	149	0	Running	35
10	8	54	Dave Coursol	Coursol Performance	Chevrolet	149	0	Running	34
11	13	9	Mathieu Kingsbury	Innovation Auto Sport	Chevrolet	149	0	Running	33
12	14	28	Frédérik Ladouceur (R)	DJK Racing	Dodge	149	0	Running	32
13	18	0	Glenn Styres	Glenn Styres Racing	Chevrolet	148	0	Running	31
14	16	84	Larry Jackson	Larry Jackson Racing	Dodge	148	0	Running	30
15	15	8	Connor Bell (R)	Ed Hakonson Racing	Chevrolet	148	0	Running	29
16	19	69	Domenic Scrivo	MBS Motorsports	Chevrolet	146	0	Running	28
17	21	85	Howie Scannell Jr.	Larry Jackson Racing	Dodge	44	0	Mechanical	27
18	20	38	Michael Goudie	RGR Motorsports	Ford	30	0	Parked	26
19	22	98	Herby Drescher	Bray Autosport	Ford	28	0	Mechanical	25
20	9	93	Martin Goulet Jr. (R)	JASS Racing with XEMIS Racing	Chevrolet	16	0	Transmission	24
21	6	39	Alex Guenette	JASS Racing with XEMIS Racing	Chevrolet	11	0	Accident	23
22	17	10	Rob Naismith (R)	MRN Racing Inc.	Chevrolet	6	0	Mechanical	22

== Standings after the race ==
	Pos	Driver	Points
	1	Marc-Antoine Camirand	267
2	2	Kevin Lacroix	220 (–47)
1	3	L. P. Dumoulin	219 (–48)
1	4	Andrew Ranger	217 (–50)
2	5	D. J. Kennington	211 (–56)
2	6	Donald Theetge	207 (–60)
1	7	Mathieu Kingsbury	204 (–63)
3	8	Alex Guenette	200 (–67)
	9	Connor Bell	195 (–72)
	10	Will Larue	194 (–73)

Previous race: 2026 XPN Burn-X 125	NASCAR Canada Series; 2026 season	Next race: 2026 NAPA 150
