= 2026 Pinty's 300 =

4th race of the 2026 NASCAR Canada Series

Race details
- Race 4 of 14 in the 2026 NASCAR Canada Series season
- Date: June 27, 2026
- Location: Riverside International Speedway in James River, Nova Scotia, Canada
- Course: Permanent racing facility
- Course length: 0.333 miles (0.536 km)
- Distance: 300 laps, 99.9 mi (160.773 km)
- Average speed: 61.236 miles per hour (98.550 km/h)

Pole position
Driver	Donald Theetge	Theetge Motorsports
- Grid positions set by competition-based formula

Most laps led
Driver	Kevin Lacroix	Innovation Auto Sport
- Laps: 219

Winner
No. 74	Kevin Lacroix	Innovation Auto Sport

Television in the United States
- Network: REV TV on YouTube

The 2026 Pinty's 300 was the fourth stock car race of the 2026 NASCAR Canada Series. The race was held on Saturday, June 27, 2026, at Riverside International Speedway, a 0.333 mi (0.536 km) oval shaped racetrack in James River, Nova Scotia, Canada. The race took the scheduled 300 laps to complete. Kevin Lacroix was able to work his way up from a seventh-place starting spot to pass race leader Donald Theetge, who would be one of the drivers he'd hold off throughout the remainder of the race, and score his first win of the season and third at the track. Theetge ultimately finished the race in second with L. P. Dumoulin rounding out the podium in third.

== Report ==
=== Background ===
Riverside International Speedway is a 0.333 mi (0.536 km), high banked, asphalt short track located in James River, Nova Scotia, Canada, about 10 km (6.2 mi) southwest of the town of Antigonish.

==== Entry list ====
- (R) denotes rookie driver.
- (i) denotes driver who is ineligible for series driver points.

#	Driver	Team	Make
3	Alex Tagliani	Ed Hakonson Racing	Chevrolet
8	Connor Bell (R)	Ed Hakonson Racing	Chevrolet
9	Mathieu Kingsbury	Innovation Auto Sport	Chevrolet
10	Rob Naismith (R)	MRN Racing Inc.	Chevrolet
17	D. J. Kennington	DJK Racing	Dodge
27	Andrew Ranger	Innovation Auto Sport	Chevrolet
28	Dexter Stacey	DJK Racing	Dodge
39	Alex Guenette	JASS Racing with XEMIS Racing	Chevrolet
47	L. P. Dumoulin	Dumoulin Compétition	Dodge
69	Frédérik Ladouceur (R)	MBS Motorsports	Chevrolet
74	Kevin Lacroix	Innovation Auto Sport	Chevrolet
80	Donald Theetge	Theetge Motorsports	Chevrolet
84	Larry Jackson	Larry Jackson Racing	Dodge
85	Howie Scannell Jr.	Larry Jackson Racing	Dodge
93	Martin Goulet Jr. (R)	JASS Racing with XEMIS Racing	Chevrolet
96	Marc-Antoine Camirand	Paillé Course//Racing	Chevrolet
98	Herby Drescher	Bray Autosport	Ford

== Practice ==
The first of two practice sessions was held on Saturday, June 27, at 12:30 PM AST. The second of two practice sessions was held on Saturday, June 27, at 1:30 PM AST. Donald Theetge was fastest in both sessions, with a best time of 14.736 seconds and a speed of 81.352 mph (130.923 km/h).

Pos.	#	Driver	Team	Make	Time	Speed
1	80	Donald Theetge	Theetge Motorsports	Chevrolet	14.736	81.352
2	96	Marc-Antoine Camirand	Paillé Course//Racing	Chevrolet	14.799	81.005
3	27	Andrew Ranger	Innovation Auto Sport	Chevrolet	14.875	80.592
Full practice results

== Qualifying ==
Qualifying was scheduled for Saturday, June 27, at 5:00 PM AST. Due to the cancellation of qualifying due to rain, the starting lineup was set by the practice times, with Donald Theetge being awarded the pole.

=== Starting lineup ===
Pos.	#	Driver	Team	Make
1	80	Donald Theetge	Theetge Motorsports	Chevrolet
2	96	Marc-Antoine Camirand	Paillé Course//Racing	Chevrolet
3	27	Andrew Ranger	Innovation Auto Sport	Chevrolet
4	47	L. P. Dumoulin	Dumoulin Compétition	Dodge
5	39	Alex Guenette	JASS Racing with XEMIS Racing	Chevrolet
6	17	D. J. Kennington	DJK Racing	Dodge
7	74	Kevin Lacroix	Innovation Auto Sport	Chevrolet
8	9	Mathieu Kingsbury	Innovation Auto Sport	Chevrolet
9	28	Dexter Stacey	DJK Racing	Dodge
10	93	Martin Goulet Jr. (R)	JASS Racing with XEMIS Racing	Chevrolet
11	8	Connor Bell (R)	Ed Hakonson Racing	Chevrolet
12	3	Alex Tagliani	Ed Hakonson Racing	Chevrolet
13	10	Rob Naismith (R)	MRN Racing Inc.	Chevrolet
14	84	Larry Jackson	Larry Jackson Racing	Dodge
15	69	Frédérik Ladouceur (R)	MBS Motorsports	Chevrolet
16	85	Howie Scannell Jr.	Larry Jackson Racing	Dodge
17	98	Herby Drescher	Bray Autosport	Ford

== Race results ==
Pos	St	#	Driver	Team	Manufacturer	Laps	Led	Status	Points
1	7	74	Kevin Lacroix	Innovation Auto Sport	Chevrolet	300	219	Running	48
2	1	80	Donald Theetge	Theetge Motorsports	Chevrolet	300	70	Running	43
3	4	47	L. P. Dumoulin	Dumoulin Compétition	Dodge	300	0	Running	41
4	2	96	Marc-Antoine Camirand	Paillé Course//Racing	Chevrolet	300	11	Running	41
5	5	39	Alex Guenette	JASS Racing with XEMIS Racing	Chevrolet	300	0	Running	39
6	8	9	Mathieu Kingsbury	Innovation Auto Sport	Chevrolet	300	0	Running	38
7	3	27	Andrew Ranger	Innovation Auto Sport	Chevrolet	300	0	Running	37
8	14	84	Larry Jackson	Larry Jackson Racing	Dodge	298	0	Running	36
9	11	8	Connor Bell (R)	Ed Hakonson Racing	Chevrolet	297	0	Running	35
10	6	17	D. J. Kennington	DJK Racing	Dodge	292	0	Running	34
11	12	3	Alex Tagliani	Ed Hakonson Racing	Chevrolet	278	0	Running	33
12	13	10	Rob Naismith (R)	MRN Racing Inc.	Chevrolet	172	0	Suspension	32
13	9	28	Dexter Stacey	DJK Racing	Dodge	137	0	Brakes	31
14	10	93	Martin Goulet Jr. (R)	JASS Racing with XEMIS Racing	Chevrolet	31	0	Engine	30
15	15	69	Frédérik Ladouceur (R)	MBS Motorsports	Chevrolet	25	0	Electrical	29
16	16	85	Howie Scannell Jr.	Larry Jackson Racing	Dodge	16	0	Mechanical	28
17	17	98	Herby Drescher	Bray Autosport	Ford	10	0	Rear End	27

== Standings after the race ==
	Pos	Driver	Points
	1	Marc-Antoine Camirand	172
1	2	L. P. Dumoulin	148 (–24)
4	3	Alex Guenette	139 (–33)
	4	Andrew Ranger	139 (–33)
3	5	Mathieu Kingsbury	138 (–34)
4	6	Kevin Lacroix	137 (–35)
1	7	Connor Bell	137 (–35)
3	8	D. J. Kennington	136 (–36)
2	9	Donald Theetge	129 (–43)
2	10	Larry Jackson	120 (–52)

Previous race: 2026 Michelob Ultra 125	NASCAR Canada Series; 2026 season	Next race: 2026 XPN Burn-X 125
