= 2026 Dorman Products 150 =

8th race of the 2026 NASCAR Canada Series

Race details
- Race 8 of 14 in the 2026 NASCAR Canada Series season
- Date: July 25, 2026
- Location: Edmonton International Raceway in County of Wetaskiwin No. 10, Alberta, Canada
- Course: Permanent racing facility
- Course length: 0.250 miles (0.402 km)
- Distance: 150 laps, 37.5 mi (60.35 km)
- Average speed: 64.841 miles per hour (104.351 km/h)

Pole position
Driver	Will Larue	Larue Motorsports
- Time: 13.138

Most laps led
Driver	Will Larue	Larue Motorsports
- Laps: 84

Winner
No. 74	Kevin Lacroix	Innovation Auto Sport

Television in the United States
- Network: REV TV on YouTube

The 2026 Dorman Products 150 was the eighth stock car race of the 2026 NASCAR Canada Series. The race was held on Saturday, July 25, 2026, at Edmonton International Raceway, a 0.250 mi (0.402 km) oval shaped racetrack outside Wetaskiwin, Alberta, Canada, approximately 50 kilometres (31 mi) south of Edmonton, and was the first race of a doubleeader. After taking the lead on lap 87, Kevin Lacroix held off the field and scored his second win of the season. Polesitter Will Larue finished in second and Marc-Antoine Camirand rounded out the podium in third.

== Report ==
=== Background ===
Edmonton International Raceway is a 0.250 mi (0.402 km), paved oval auto racing facility, located outside Wetaskiwin, Alberta, Canada, approximately 50 kilometres (31 mi) south of Edmonton. The track is the first in Alberta to be sanctioned by NASCAR.

==== Entry list ====
- (R) denotes rookie driver.
- (i) denotes driver who is ineligible for series driver points.

#	Driver	Team	Make
3	Alex Tagliani	Ed Hakonson Racing	Chevrolet
8	Connor Bell (R)	Ed Hakonson Racing	Chevrolet
10	Rob Naismith (R)	MRN Racing	Chevrolet
17	D. J. Kennington	DJK Racing	Dodge
28	Matthew Shirley	DJK Racing	Dodge
45	Will Larue (R)	Larue Motorsports	Chevrolet
47	L. P. Dumoulin	Dumoulin Compétition	Dodge
69	Domenic Scrivo	MBS Motorsports	Chevrolet
74	Kevin Lacroix	Innovation Auto Sport	Chevrolet
80	Donald Theetge	Theetge Motorsports	Chevrolet
84	Larry Jackson	Larry Jackson Racing	Dodge
85	Howie Scannell Jr.	Larry Jackson Racing	Dodge
96	Marc-Antoine Camirand	Paillé Course//Racing	Chevrolet
98	Jamie Krzysik	Bray Autosport	Chevrolet

== Practice ==
The first of two practice sessions was held on Saturday, July 25, at 12:05 PM MST. The second of two practice sessions was held on Saturday, July 25, at 1:30 PM MST. Will Larue would set the fastest overall time with a lap of 13.186 seconds and a speed of 68.254 mph (109.844 km/h).

Pos.	#	Driver	Team	Make	Time	Speed
1	45	Will Larue (R)	Larue Motorsports	Chevrolet	13.186	68.254
2	80	Donald Theetge	Theetge Motorsports	Chevrolet	13.205	68.156
3	74	Kevin Lacroix	Innovation Auto Sport	Chevrolet	13.255	67.899
Full practice results

== Qualifying ==
Qualifying took place on Saturday, July 25, at 4:40 PM MST. Will Larue, driving for Larue Motorsports, would win the pole with a lap of 13.138 seconds and a speed of 68.504 mph (110.247 km/h).

=== Qualifying results ===
Pos.	#	Driver	Team	Make	Time	Speed
1	45	Will Larue (R)	Larue Motorsports	Chevrolet	13.138	68.504
2	98	Jamie Krzysik	Bray Autosport	Chevrolet	13.141	68.488
3	74	Kevin Lacroix	Innovation Auto Sport	Chevrolet	13.169	68.342
4	80	Donald Theetge	Theetge Motorsports	Chevrolet	13.173	68.322
5	47	L. P. Dumoulin	Dumoulin Compétition	Dodge	13.211	68.125
6	17	D. J. Kennington	DJK Racing	Dodge	13.230	68.027
7	96	Marc-Antoine Camirand	Paillé Course//Racing	Chevrolet	13.245	67.950
8	8	Connor Bell (R)	Ed Hakonson Racing	Chevrolet	13.317	67.853
9	28	Matthew Shirley	DJK Racing	Dodge	13.394	67.194
10	3	Alex Tagliani	Ed Hakonson Racing	Chevrolet	13.422	67.054
11	10	Rob Naismith (R)	MRN Racing	Chevrolet	13.543	66.455
12	69	Domenic Scrivo	MBS Motorsports	Chevrolet	13.564	66.352
13	84	Larry Jackson	Larry Jackson Racing	Dodge	13.567	66.337
14	85	Howie Scannell Jr.	Larry Jackson Racing	Dodge	13.962	64.461
Full qualifying results

== Race results ==
Pos	St	#	Driver	Team	Manufacturer	Laps	Led	Status	Points
1	3	74	Kevin Lacroix	Innovation Auto Sport	Chevrolet	150	66	Running	47
2	1	45	Will Larue (R)	Larue Motorsports	Chevrolet	150	84	Running	44
3	7	96	Marc-Antoine Camirand	Paillé Course//Racing	Chevrolet	150	0	Running	41
4	4	80	Donald Theetge	Theetge Motorsports	Chevrolet	150	0	Running	40
5	5	47	L. P. Dumoulin	Dumoulin Compétition	Dodge	149	0	Running	39
6	2	98	Jamie Krzysik	Bray Autosport	Chevrolet	149	0	Running	38
7	6	17	D. J. Kennington	DJK Racing	Dodge	148	0	Running	37
8	9	28	Matthew Shirley	DJK Racing	Dodge	148	0	Running	36
9	12	84	Larry Jackson	Larry Jackson Racing	Dodge	147	0	Running	35
10	8	8	Connor Bell (R)	Ed Hakonson Racing	Chevrolet	147	0	Running	34
11	11	10	Rob Naismith (R)	MRN Racing	Chevrolet	146	0	Running	33
12	10	3	Alex Tagliani	Ed Hakonson Racing	Chevrolet	103	0	Running	32
13	14	69	Domenic Scrivo	MBS Motorsports	Chevrolet	43	0	Mechanical	31
14	13	85	Howie Scannell Jr.	Larry Jackson Racing	Dodge	6	0	Mechanical	30

== Standings after the race ==
	Pos	Driver	Points
	1	Marc-Antoine Camirand	349
2	2	Kevin Lacroix	301 (–48)
	3	L. P. Dumoulin	295 (–54)
1	4	D. J. Kennington	284 (–65)
3	5	Connor Bell	267 (–82)
3	6	Alex Tagliani	260 (–89)
5	7	Andrew Ranger	258 (–91)
2	8	Donald Theetge	247 (–102)
3	9	Alex Guenette	242 (–107)
1	10	Larry Jackson	241 (–108)

Previous race: 2026 NAPA 150	NASCAR Canada Series; 2026 season	Next race: 2026 Carlyle Tools 150
