= 2026 Carlyle Tools 150 =

9th race of the 2026 NASCAR Canada Series

2026 Carlyle Products 150
Race details
- Race 9 of 14 in the 2026 NASCAR Canada Series season
- Date: July 25, 2026
- Location: Edmonton International Raceway in County of Wetaskiwin No. 10, Alberta, Canada
- Course: Permanent racing facility
- Course length: 0.250 miles (0.402 km)
- Distance: 86 laps, 21.5 mi (34.60 km)
- Scheduled distance: 150 laps, 37.5 mi (60.35 km)
- Average speed: 61.526 miles per hour (99.016 km/h)

Pole position
Driver	Will Larue	Larue Motorsports
- Time: 13.089
- Grid positions set by competition-based formula

Most laps led
Driver	Marc-Antoine Camirand	Paillé Course//Racing
- Laps: 41

Winner
No. 96	Marc-Antoine Camirand	Paillé Course//Racing

Television in the United States
- Network: REV TV on YouTube

The 2026 Carlyle Tools 150 was the ninth stock car race of the 2026 NASCAR Canada Series. The race was held on Saturday, July 25, 2026, at Edmonton International Raceway, a 0.250 mi (0.402 km) oval shaped racetrack outside Wetaskiwin, Alberta, Canada, approximately 50 kilometres (31 mi) south of Edmonton, and was the second race of a doubleheader. After the lead traded hands multiple times, Marc-Antoine Camirand was able to maintain it until a red flag was brought out due to rain; the race was ultimately called after 86 laps, with Camirand declared the winner. Donald Theetge finished in second and Kevin Lacroix rounded out the podium in third.

== Report ==
=== Background ===
Edmonton International Raceway is a 0.250 mi (0.402 km), paved oval auto racing facility, located outside Wetaskiwin, Alberta, Canada, approximately 50 kilometres (31 mi) south of Edmonton. The track is the first in Alberta to be sanctioned by NASCAR.

==== Entry list ====
- (R) denotes rookie driver.
- (i) denotes driver who is ineligible for series driver points.

#	Driver	Team	Make
3	Alex Tagliani	Ed Hakonson Racing	Chevrolet
8	Connor Bell (R)	Ed Hakonson Racing	Chevrolet
10	Rob Naismith (R)	MRN Racing	Chevrolet
17	D. J. Kennington	DJK Racing	Dodge
28	Matthew Shirley	DJK Racing	Dodge
45	Will Larue (R)	Larue Motorsports	Chevrolet
47	L. P. Dumoulin	Dumoulin Compétition	Dodge
69	Domenic Scrivo	MBS Motorsports	Chevrolet
74	Kevin Lacroix	Innovation Auto Sport	Chevrolet
80	Donald Theetge	Theetge Motorsports	Chevrolet
84	Larry Jackson	Larry Jackson Racing	Dodge
85	Howie Scannell Jr.	Larry Jackson Racing	Dodge
96	Marc-Antoine Camirand	Paillé Course//Racing	Chevrolet
98	Jamie Krzysik	Bray Autosport	Chevrolet

== Practice ==
The first of two practice sessions was held on Saturday, July 25, at 12:05 PM MST. The second of two practice sessions was held on Saturday, July 25, at 1:30 PM MST. Will Larue would set the fastest overall time with a lap of 13.186 seconds and a speed of 68.254 mph (109.844 km/h).

Pos.	#	Driver	Team	Make	Time	Speed
1	45	Will Larue (R)	Larue Motorsports	Chevrolet	13.186	68.254
2	80	Donald Theetge	Theetge Motorsports	Chevrolet	13.205	68.156
3	74	Kevin Lacroix	Innovation Auto Sport	Chevrolet	13.255	67.899
Full practice results

== Qualifying ==
The starting lineup was set by fastest laps in the Dorman Products 150.

=== Starting lineup ===
Pos.	#	Driver	Team	Make	Time	Speed
1	45	Will Larue (R)	Larue Motorsports	Chevrolet	13.089	68.760
2	74	Kevin Lacroix	Innovation Auto Sport	Chevrolet	13.230	68.027
3	17	D. J. Kennington	DJK Racing	Dodge	13.339	67.471
4	47	L. P. Dumoulin	Dumoulin Compétition	Dodge	13.348	67.426
5	96	Marc-Antoine Camirand	Paillé Course//Racing	Chevrolet	13.372	67.305
6	80	Donald Theetge	Theetge Motorsports	Chevrolet	13.375	67.290
7	28	Matthew Shirley	DJK Racing	Dodge	13.393	67.199
8	98	Jamie Krzysik	Bray Autosport	Chevrolet	13.414	67.094
9	3	Alex Tagliani	Ed Hakonson Racing	Chevrolet	13.457	66.880
10	84	Larry Jackson	Larry Jackson Racing	Dodge	13.473	66.800
11	8	Connor Bell (R)	Ed Hakonson Racing	Chevrolet	13.493	66.701
12	10	Rob Naismith (R)	MRN Racing	Chevrolet	13.570	66.323
13	69	Domenic Scrivo	MBS Motorsports	Chevrolet	13.598	66.186
14	85	Howie Scannell Jr.	Larry Jackson Racing	Dodge	13.969	64.428
Full starting lineup

== Race results ==
Pos	St	#	Driver	Team	Manufacturer	Laps	Led	Status	Points
1	5	96	Marc-Antoine Camirand	Paillé Course//Racing	Chevrolet	86	41	Running	48
2	6	80	Donald Theetge	Theetge Motorsports	Chevrolet	86	26	Running	43
3	2	74	Kevin Lacroix	Innovation Auto Sport	Chevrolet	86	1	Running	42
4	1	45	Will Larue (R)	Larue Motorsports	Chevrolet	86	15	Running	41
5	4	47	L. P. Dumoulin	Dumoulin Compétition	Dodge	86	0	Running	39
6	3	17	D. J. Kennington	DJK Racing	Dodge	86	3	Running	39
7	8	98	Jamie Krzysik	Bray Autosport	Chevrolet	86	0	Running	37
8	9	3	Alex Tagliani	Ed Hakonson Racing	Chevrolet	86	0	Running	36
9	10	84	Larry Jackson	Larry Jackson Racing	Dodge	86	0	Running	35
10	11	8	Connor Bell (R)	Ed Hakonson Racing	Chevrolet	85	0	Running	34
11	12	10	Rob Naismith (R)	MRN Racing	Chevrolet	85	0	Running	33
12	7	28	Matthew Shirley	DJK Racing	Chevrolet	85	0	Running	32
13	13	69	Domenic Scrivo	MBS Motorsports	Chevrolet	78	0	Running	31
14	14	85	Howie Scannell Jr.	Larry Jackson Racing	Dodge	13	0	Mechanical	30

== Standings after the race ==
	Pos	Driver	Points
	1	Marc-Antoine Camirand	397
	2	Kevin Lacroix	343 (–54)
	3	L. P. Dumoulin	334 (–63)
	4	D. J. Kennington	323 (–74)
	5	Connor Bell	301 (–96)
	6	Alex Tagliani	296 (–101)
1	7	Donald Theetge	290 (–107)
3	8	Will Larue	279 (–118)
1	9	Larry Jackson	276 (–121)
3	10	Andrew Ranger	258 (–139)

Previous race: 2026 Dorman Products 150	NASCAR Canada Series; 2026 season	Next race: 2026 Le Tours 45 CarGurus (points); 2026 Omnifab Sprints (exhibition)
