= 2026 NAPA 150 =

7th race of the 2026 NASCAR Canada Series

Race details
- Race 7 of 14 in the 2026 NASCAR Canada Series season
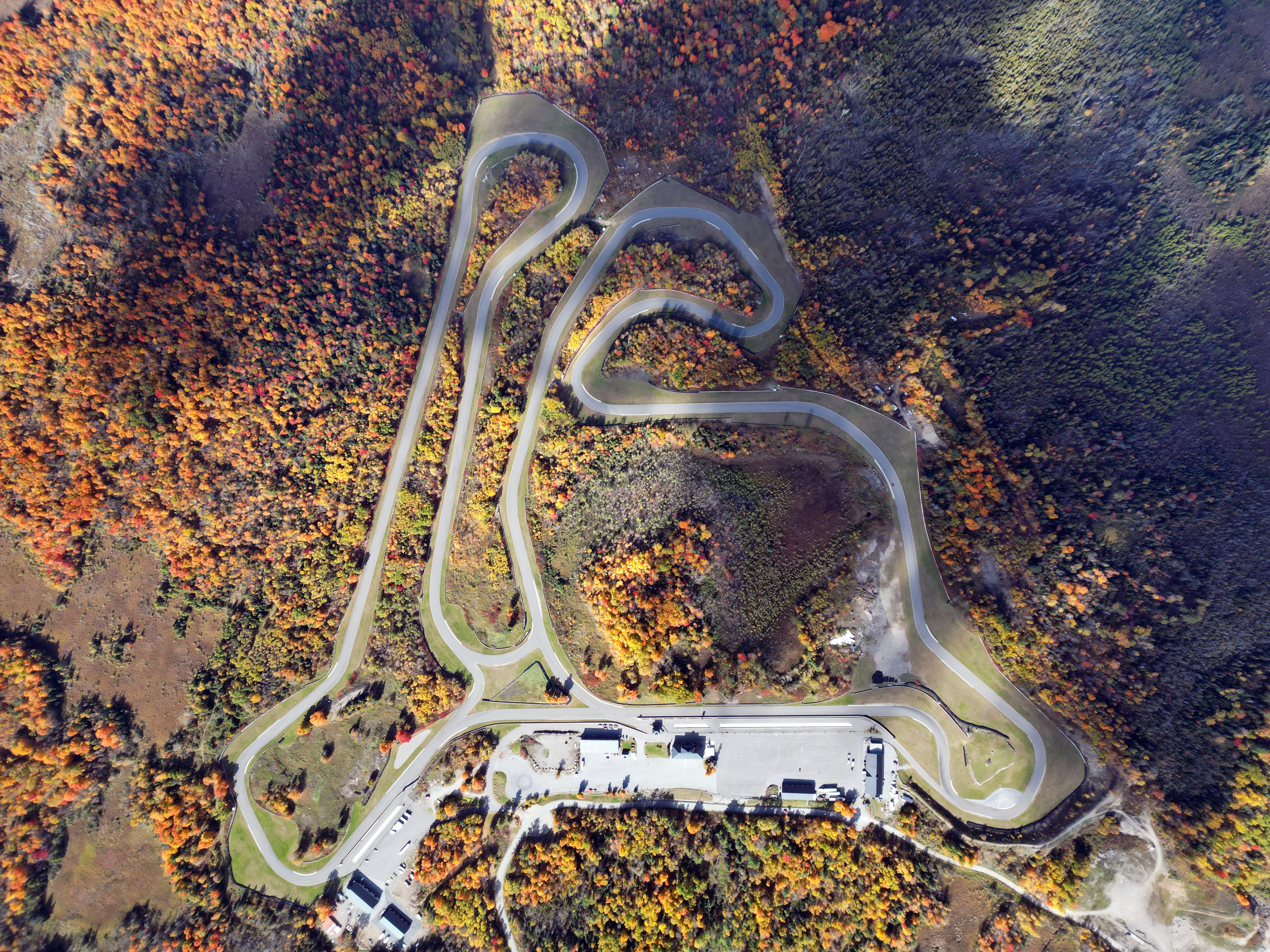
- Date: July 19, 2026
- Location: Calabogie Motorsports Park in Calabogie, Ontario, Canada
- Course: Permanent racing facility
- Course length: 1.742 miles (2.803 km)
- Distance: 50 laps, 87.1 mi (140.174 km)
- Average speed: 59.409 miles per hour (95.610 km/h)

Pole position
Driver	Marc-Antoine Camirand	Paillé Course//Racing
- Grid positions set by competition-based formula

Most laps led
Driver	Alex Tagliani	Theetge Motorsports
- Laps: 36

Winner
No. 80	Alex Tagliani	Theetge Motorsports

Television in the United States
- Network: REV TV on YouTube

The 2026 NAPA 150 was the seventh stock car race of the 2026 NASCAR Canada Series. The race was held on Sunday, July 19, 2026, at Calabogie Motorsports Park's Stadium Course, a 1.742 mi (2.803 km) road course in Calabogie, Ontario, Canada. After taking the lead from polesitter Marc-Antoine Camirand on lap 16, Alex Tagliani would lead for the remainder of the race and scored his first win since 2023. Alex Guenette finished the race in second and Andrew Ranger rounded out the podium in third.

== Report ==
=== Background ===
Calabogie Motorsports Park is the longest road course in Canada, at 5.050 km (3.138 mi), located 4-kilometre (2.5 mi) east of the community of Calabogie in the township of Greater Madawaska, Ontario, Canada. It hosts regional road racing and is the main circuit in the Ottawa metropolitan area.

==== Entry list ====
- (R) denotes rookie driver.
- (i) denotes driver who is ineligible for series driver points.

#	Driver	Team	Make
0	Jeff Lapcevich	Glenn Styres Racing	Chevrolet
1	Jean-Philippe Bergeron	Prolon Racing	Ford
3	Connor Bell (R)	Ed Hakonson Racing	Chevrolet
8	Dexter Stacey	Ed Hakonson Racing	Chevrolet
9	Mathieu Kingsbury	Innovation Auto Sport	Chevrolet
14	Geoff Johnson (R)	Johnson Motorsports	Ford
17	D. J. Kennington	DJK Racing	Dodge
24	Jeff Cavanagh (R)	BC Race Cars	Ford
27	Andrew Ranger	Paillé Course//Racing	Chevrolet
28	Brad Ranson (R)	DJK Racing	Chevrolet
38	Simon Dion-Viens	RGR Motorsports	Dodge
39	Alex Guenette	JASS Racing with XEMIS Racing	Chevrolet
47	L. P. Dumoulin	Dumoulin Compétition	Dodge
48	Ronald Tomlinson (R)	Tomlinson Motorsports	Ford
54	Dave Coursol	Coursol Performance	Dodge
69	Domenic Scrivo	MBS Motorsports	Chevrolet
71	Gary Klutt	Legendary Motorcar Company	Dodge
74	Kevin Lacroix	Innovation Auto Sport	Chevrolet
75	Ben Couture	BCM Motorsports	Dodge
80	Alex Tagliani	Theetge Motorsports	Chevrolet
84	Larry Jackson	Larry Jackson Racing	Dodge
85	Darryl Timmers	Larry Jackson Racing	Dodge
87	Sam Fellows	Fellows McGraw Racing	Chevrolet
88	Simon Charbonneau	Eighty8 Racing	Chevrolet
93	Jacques Guenette Sr. (R)	JASS Racing with XEMIS Racing	Chevrolet
94	Sylvain Ouellet (R)	Theetge Motorsports	Chevrolet
96	Marc-Antoine Camirand	Paillé Course//Racing	Chevrolet
98	Malcolm Strachan	Bray Autosport	Ford

== Practice ==
Prior to official practice, an unofficial test session was held on Friday, July 17, where Alex Guenette recorded the fastest lap. Two practice sessions were held on Saturday, July 18, the first at 11:15 AM EST and the second at 1:00 PM EST. Due to wet track conditions, only eight drivers participated in Friday practice, where Malcolm Strachan would set the fastest time with a lap of 1:13.192 and an estimated speed of 85.861 mph (138.18 km/h).

Pos.	#	Driver	Team	Make	Time	Speed
1	98	Malcolm Strachan	Bray Autosport	Ford	1:13.192	85.861
2	0	Jeff Lapcevich	Glenn Styres Racing	Chevrolet	1:15.812	82.720
3	85	Darryl Timmers	Larry Jackson Racing	Dodge	1:16.260	82.234
Full practice results

== Qualifying ==
Qualifying was scheduled to be held on Saturday, July 18, at 5:25 PM EST. Due to inclement weather cancelling qualifying, Marc-Antoine Camirand was awarded the pole when the starting lineup was set according to the rulebook.

=== Starting lineup ===
Pos.	#	Driver	Team	Make
1	96	Marc-Antoine Camirand	Paillé Course//Racing	Chevrolet
2	80	Alex Tagliani	Theetge Motorsports	Chevrolet
3	74	Kevin Lacroix	Innovation Auto Sport	Chevrolet
4	47	L. P. Dumoulin	Dumoulin Compétition	Dodge
5	27	Andrew Ranger	Paillé Course//Racing	Chevrolet
6	17	D. J. Kennington	DJK Racing	Dodge
7	9	Mathieu Kingsbury	Innovation Auto Sport	Chevrolet
8	39	Alex Guenette	JASS Racing with XEMIS Racing	Chevrolet
9	3	Connor Bell (R)	Ed Hakonson Racing	Chevrolet
10	8	Dexter Stacey	Ed Hakonson Racing	Chevrolet
11	84	Larry Jackson	Larry Jackson Racing	Dodge
12	54	Dave Coursol	Coursol Performance	Dodge
13	85	Darryl Timmers	Larry Jackson Racing	Dodge
14	0	Jeff Lapcevich	Glenn Styres Racing	Chevrolet
15	38	Simon Dion-Viens	RGR Motorsports	Dodge
16	69	Domenic Scrivo	MBS Motorsports	Chevrolet
17	28	Brad Ranson (R)	DJK Racing	Chevrolet
18	71	Gary Klutt	Legendary Motorcar Company	Dodge
19	93	Jacques Guenette Sr. (R)	JASS Racing with XEMIS Racing	Chevrolet
20	98	Malcolm Strachan	Bray Autosport	Ford
21	1	J. P. Bergeron	Prolon Racing	Ford
22	88	Simon Charbonneau	Eighty8 Racing	Chevrolet
23	48	Ron Tomlinson (R)	Tomlinson Motorsports	Ford
24	24	Jeff Cavanagh (R)	BC Race Cars	Ford
25	87	Sam Fellows	Fellows McGraw Racing	Chevrolet
26	14	Geoff Johnson (R)	Johnson Motorsports	Ford
27	75	Benoît Couture	BCM Motorsports	Dodge
28	94	Sylvain Ouellet (R)	Theetge Motorsports	Chevrolet

== Race results ==
Pos	St	#	Driver	Team	Manufacturer	Laps	Led	Status	Points
1	2	80	Alex Tagliani	Theetge Motorsports	Chevrolet	50	36	Running	48
2	8	39	Alex Guenette	JASS Racing with XEMIS Racing	Chevrolet	50	0	Running	42
3	5	27	Andrew Ranger	Innovation Auto Sport	Chevrolet	50	0	Running	41
4	1	96	Marc-Antoine Camirand	Paillé Course//Racing	Chevrolet	50	14	Running	41
5	18	71	Gary Klutt	Legendary Motorcar Company	Dodge	50	0	Running	39
6	9	3	Connor Bell (R)	Ed Hakonson Racing	Chevrolet	50	0	Running	38
7	4	47	L. P. Dumoulin	Dumoulin Compétition	Dodge	50	0	Running	37
8	6	17	D. J. Kennington	DJK Racing	Dodge	50	0	Running	36
9	25	87	Sam Fellows	Fellows McGraw Racing	Chevrolet	50	0	Running	35
10	3	74	Kevin Lacroix	Innovation Auto Sport	Chevrolet	50	0	Running	34
11	20	98	Malcolm Strachan	Bray Autosport	Ford	50	0	Running	33
12	13	85	Darryl Timmers	Larry Jackson Racing	Dodge	50	0	Running	32
13	24	24	Jeff Cavanagh (R)	BC Race Cars	Ford	50	0	Running	31
14	14	0	Jeff Lapcevich	Glenn Styres Racing	Chevrolet	50	0	Running	30
15	7	9	Mathieu Kingsbury	Innovation Auto Sport	Chevrolet	50	0	Running	29
16	17	28	Brad Ranson (R)	DJK Racing	Chevrolet	50	0	Running	28
17	16	38	Simon Dion-Viens	RGR Motorsports	Dodge	50	0	Running	27
18	26	14	Geoff Johnson (R)	Johnson Motorsports	Ford	50	0	Running	26
19	11	84	Larry Jackson	Larry Jackson Racing	Dodge	50	0	Running	25
20	19	93	Jacques Guenette Sr. (R)	JASS Racing with XEMIS Racing	Chevrolet	49	0	Running	24
21	27	75	Benoît Couture	BCM Motorsports	Dodge	49	0	Running	23
22	23	48	Ron Tomlinson	Tomlinson Motorsports	Ford	47	0	Running	22
23	28	94	Sylvain Ouellet (R)	Theetge Motorsports	Chevrolet	44	0	Running	21
24	21	1	J. P. Bergeron	Prolon Racing	Ford	39	0	Mechanical	20
25	16	69	Domenic Scrivo	MBS Motorsports	Chevrolet	33	0	Running	19
26	12	54	Dave Coursol	Coursol Performance	Dodge	33	0	Running	18
27	10	8	Dexter Stacey	Ed Hakonson Racing	Chevrolet	27	0	Transmission	17
28	22	88	Simon Charbonneau	Eighty8 Racing	Chevrolet	18	0	Accident	16

== Standings after the race ==
	Pos	Driver	Points
	1	Marc-Antoine Camirand	308
2	2	Andrew Ranger	258 (–50)
	3	L. P. Dumoulin	256 (–52)
2	4	Kevin Lacroix	254 (–54)
	5	D. J. Kennington	247 (–61)
2	6	Alex Guenette	242 (–66)
	7	Mathieu Kingsbury	233 (–75)
1	8	Connor Bell	233 (–75)
3	9	Alex Tagliani	228 (–80)
4	10	Donald Theetge	207 (–101)

Previous race: 2026 Delta Electrolyte 150	NASCAR Canada Series; 2026 season	Next race: 2026 Dorman Products 150
