= REV TV Canada =

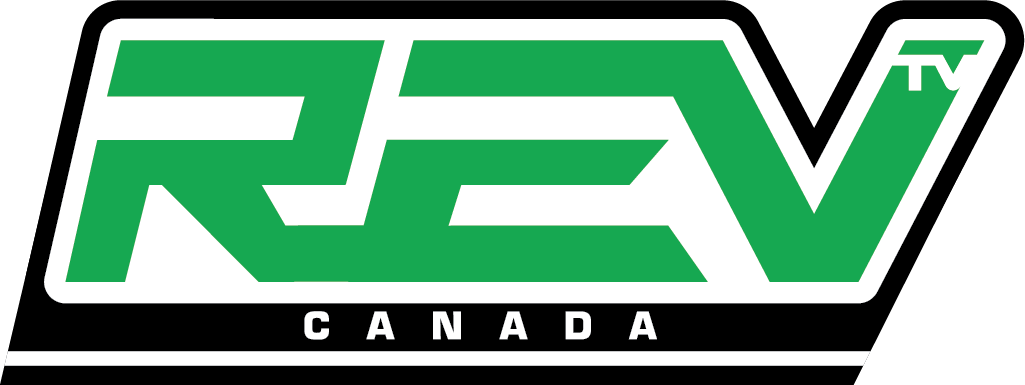
- Country: Canada
- Broadcast area: National
- Headquarters: Burlington, Ontario

Programming
- Picture format: 480i (SDTV); 1080i (HDTV)

Ownership
- Owner: REV Sports Entertainment Inc.

History
- Launched: January 10, 2017
- Former names: MAVTV Canada (2017-2020)

Links
- Website: REV TV Canada

RevTV Canada is a Canadian English language exempt Category B specialty channel owned by REV Sports Entertainment Inc. The channel broadcasts programs related to motorsports and other automotive shows.

== History ==
In May 2015, Anthem Sports & Entertainment announced that it had reached an agreement with Lucas Oil to launch its MAVTV-branded channel in Canada as a localized Canadian channel. Despite the announcement, no expected launch date was specified by either party as no agreements with television service providers were reached at that point.

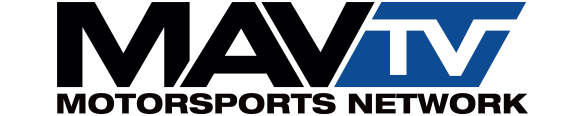
Original logo from 2017 - 2019

In December 2016, the channel's parent company announced that it had reached an agreement with the Canadian Cable Systems Alliance (CCSA), allowing the channel to become available for distribution to its membership of independent Canadian cable television service providers, which would see the channel launch on January 10, 2017. The press release announcing the launch of the channel excluded any reference to Anthem Sports & Entertainment; instead referencing REV Sports Entertainment Inc., now the owner of the channel. Heading the channel was Mike Garrow, referenced in the original press release in 2015 announcing the licensing agreement with Anthem Sports & Entertainment, who at the time would "oversee the rollout and launch of MAVTV Canada, working with Anthem's technical and production teams."

Logo from 2019 - 2020

The channel launched as expected on January 10, 2017 through several CCSA members as MAVTV Canada under licence from Lucas Oil. In June 2017, the channel launched in high definition, with Tbaytel, the largest distributor of the channel at the time. Less than a month later, the channel was launched on Eastlink. The channel was subsequently launched on additional providers since.

In May 2020, the channel was renamed REV TV Canada, ending the licensing deal with Lucas Oil. REV TV Canada is now available to over 6 million households across Canada and features over 200 races from around the world. The channel showcases all forms of racing, such as MotoGP, World Rally Championship, AMA Supercross Championship, All Star Circuit of Champions, AMSOIL National Sprint Car Championship, Indy Lights, Super Formula, Castrol® FloRacing Night In America, AMSOIL Championship Snocross, 400 Thunder Drag Racing, ARCA Midwest Tour, SPEED SPORT TV, along with news coverage such as The Inside Line (F1), Winged Nation, and Tuning 365 Performance Auto & Sound Magazine. REV TV Canada also produces original programming with REV Culture and All North Racing, and features a variety of lifestyle programs that feature prominent interviews, how-to and behind-the-scenes features, and more. REV TV Canada brands itself as "YOUR MOTORSPORTS & AUTOMOTIVE DESTINATION 24/7."

In June 2022, REV TV Canada was added to Rogers Ignite TV (channel 540) making the channel available on nearly every major TV provider in Canada.

== Programming ==
- ARCA Menards Series
- All Star Circuit of Champions
- AMA Supercross Championship
- ARCA Midwest Tour
- European Rally Championship
- Extreme E
- FIA World Endurance Championship
- FIA World Rallycross Championship
- Grand Prix motorcycle racing
- IMSA
- Indy Lights
- Isle of Man TT
- Monster Jam
- NASCAR Canada Series
- Race of Champions
- Sidecarcross World Championship
- Speed Sport
- Superbike World Championship
- Super Formula Championship
- United States Auto Club
- World Rally Championship
