= Mathieu Kingsbury =

Canadian racing driver (born 1985)

- Born: February 26, 1985 (age 41); Blainville, Quebec, Canada

NASCAR Canada Series career
- 37 races run over 7 years
- Car no., team: No. 9 (Innovation Auto Sport)
- 2026 position: 12th
- Best finish: 6th (2025)
- First race: 2019 Lucas Oil 250 (St. Eustache)
- Last race: 2026 WeatherTech 200 (Mosport)
Wins	Top tens	Poles
0	18	0
- Statistics up to date as of September 13, 2026.

Mathieu Kingsbury (born February 26, 1985) is a Canadian professional stock car racing. He competes part-time in the NASCAR Canada Series, driving the No. 9 Chevrolet for Innovation Auto Sport, a team he co-owns with fellow driver Kevin Lacroix.

== Racing career ==
Kingsbury began his racing career in 2016, racing at Autodrome St. Eustache in the sportsman class.

Kingsbury debuted in the NASCAR Whelen All-American Series in 2017, competing in ten races at Autodrome St. Eustache and finishing 11th in the track championship. That same year, he also competed in the first two races of the ACT Late Model Tour and full time in the Serie ACT Quebec, finishing tenth in the standings.

In 2018, Kingsbury returned to the ACT Late Model Tour for one race. He would compete full-time in the Canadian Stock Car Championship, scoring a best finish of second at Circuit Trois-Rivières.

Kingsbury ran nine of ten races in the 2019 ACT season, finishing sixth in the standings. He would also make his NASCAR Pinty’s Series debut, where driving the No. 75 Dodge for Kevin Lacroix's team, he would finish inside the top-ten in all three starts.

Kingsbury returned to the Pinty's Series, known as the Pinty's FanCave Challenge for the year, in 2020. He drove the No. 75 in four of the season's six races, scoring his first top-five with a fifth place result at Sunset Speedway.

In 2021, Kingsbury did not compete in any Pinty's Series races, but rather returned to the NASCAR Advance Auto Parts Weekly Series for the first time since 2017, this time competing at Autodrome Chaudière, where he ran seven races, scoring his first series win.

Kingsbury returned to ACT and Pinty's Series competition in 2022, competing in three ACT races, although he failed to finish all three. In the Pinty's Series, he drove the No. 12 Dodge for his own team, Duroking Autosport, in four races, scoring a best finish of 14th twice. He would also compete in five World Series of Asphalt races at New Smyrna Speedway, scoring a best finish of 11th twice.

Kingsbury ran two ACT races in 2023, contending for a win at Autodrome Montmagny in July. He returned to the Serie ACT Quebec for the first time since 2017, competing full time and scoring a win at Autodrome Montmagny. He made one Pinty's Series start for his own team, finishing sixteenth at Autodrome Chaudière.

Kingsbury would compete in one ACT race and seven Serie ACT Quebec races in 2024. Prior to the 2024 NASCAR Canada Series season, Kingsbury would partner with competitor Kevin Lacroix to form Innovation Auto Sport. Driving the No. 9 Dodge, Kingsbury competed in three Canada Series races in 2024, scoring his second career top-five with a fourth place finish in the season finale at Montmagny.

For 2025, Kingsbury would move to competing in the Canada Series full-time, continuing to drive Innovation Auto Sport's No. 9.

== Motorsports career results ==
=== NASCAR ===
(key) (Bold – Pole position awarded by qualifying time. Italics – Pole position earned by points standings or practice time. * – Most laps led.)

==== Canada Series ====
NASCAR Canada Series results
Year	Team	No.	Make	1	2	3	4	5	6	7	8	9	10	11	12	13	14	NCSC	Pts	Ref
2019	Lacroix Motorsports	75	Dodge	MSP	JUK	ACD	TOR	SAS	SAS	EIR	CTR	RIS	MSP	ASE; 10	NHA; 8	JUK; 9		24th	105	
2020	Lacroix Motorsports	75	Dodge	SUN; 5	SUN; 11	FLA	FLA	JUK; 13	JUK; 16									14th	131	
2022	Duroking Autosport	12	Dodge	SUN	MSP	ACD; 14	AVE	TOR	EDM	SAS	SAS	CTR; 18	OSK	ICAR; 14	MSP	DEL; 21		26th	109	
2023	Duroking Autosport	12	Dodge	SUN	MSP	ACD; 16	AVE	TOR	EIR	SAS	SAS	CTR	OSK	OSK	ICAR	MSP	DEL	51st	28	
2024	Innovation Auto Sport	9	Dodge	MSP	ACD; 15	AVE; 15	RIS	RIS	OSK	SAS	EIR	CTR	ICAR	MSP	DEL	AMS; 4		29th	98	
2025	Innovation Auto Sport	9	Chevy	MSP; 15	RIS; 5	EDM; 7	SAS; 7	CMP; 7	ACD; 5	CTR; 13	ICAR; 7	MSP; 22	DEL; 8	DEL; 8	AMS; 7			6th	419	
2026	Innovation Auto Sport	9	Chevy	MSP; 20	ACD; 7	ACD; 5	RIS; 6	AMS; 11	AMS; 11	CMP; 15	EIR	EIR	CTR; 20	MAR	ICAR; 9	MSP; 16	DEL	12th	333	

^{*} Season still in progress
^{1} Ineligible for series points
