= Larry Jackson (racing driver) =

Canadian racing driver (born 1974)

- Born: May 12, 1974 (age 52); Oakville, Ontario, Canada

NASCAR Canada Series career
- 138 races run over 15 years
- Car no., team: No. 84 (Larry Jackson Racing)
- 2026 position: 8th
- Best finish: 7th (2020, 2024)
- First race: 2012 Vortex Brake Pads 200 (Mosport)
- Last race: 2026 NTN BCA 200 (Delaware)
Wins	Top tens	Poles
0	40	0
- Statistics up to date as of September 13, 2026.

Larry Jackson (born May 12, 1974) is a Canadian professional stock car racing driver. He competes full-time in the NASCAR Canada Series, driving the No. 84 Dodge for his own team, Larry Jackson Racing.

== Racing career ==
Jackson began racing at the age of fifteen. He debuted in the CASCAR Super Series East in 1994, finishing 24th in a race at Jukasa Motor Speedway.

Jackson began racing in the Race of Champions Asphalt Modified Tour in 2002, and between 2003 and 2005 competed in races in both the National and North regions, before only running the North in 2006 and returning to both divisions in 2007. He competed in the 2003 Sunoco Race of Champions at Oswego Speedway in New York, finishing 32nd.

Jackson also made his ACT Late Model Tour debut in 2007, finishing sixth at Kawartha Speedway. He again raced at an ACT race at Kawartha in 2008, scoring another top ten in eighth, and also made his Serie ACT Quebec, then the Serie ACT-Castrol, debut at Capital City Speedway, finishing 24th after overheating issues took him out of the race.

In 2010, Jackson competed in two OSCAAR Outlaw Super Late Model Series events, finishing in the top-ten in both races. He also competed in that year's ACT Invitational at New Hampshire Motor Speedway, finishing in 34th.

Jackson began competing in the NASCAR Canadian Tire Series in 2012. In his debut at Canadian Tire Motorsport Park, driving the No. 81 Dodge for Brian Barton, he started in twentieth and finished in sixteenth. He ran eight more races in the series in 2012, all in the No. 81, scoring his first top-ten at Barrie Speedway.

In 2013, Jackson moved to Jim Bray's team and competed in all but one race, scoring a new best finish of seventh at Delaware Speedway. He continued competing for Jim Bray Autosport in 2014, competing in five races with a best finish of seventh at Edmonton International Raceway. Jackson competed in four races in Jim Bray's No. 98 in 2015, scoring a best finish of eighth at Autodrome Chaudière.

Jackson drove for Brian Barton again in the season opener of the renamed NASCAR Pinty’s Series in 2016 before driving for Bud Morris' Canada's Best Racing Team for the majority of the season, where he scored a career best third place finish at Sunset Speedway. Jackson continued competing for CBRT in 2017, as well as making a start for DJK Racing. His best result of the season was seventh, twice.

In 2018, Jackson competed for various race teams, scoring a best finish of eighth at Edmonton. Jackson only competed in three races in 2019, as he became a crew chief for Jason White. In the abbreviated 2020 season, Jackson ran the full six race schedule split between Jim Bray's No. 98 and his own No. 84, scoring a best finish of sixth at Jukasa and finishing seventh in the points standings.

Jackson again competed full-time in 2021. He scored a best finish of seventh at Sunset Speedway and finished tenth in the standings. Jackson's No. 84 team returned full-time in 2022. Jackson competed as the driver in ten of the season's thirteen races, scoring a best finish of eighth at Circuit Trois-Rivières. Jackson and his team returned for the 2023 season, with Jackson driving the No. 84 full-time and Matthew Scannell driving a second part-time entry. Jackson's best finish of the season was a seventh place result at Eastbound Speedway.

Jackson ran nearly the entire schedule in the rebranded NASCAR Canada Series in 2024, skipping only one race while Daniel Bois drove the No. 84. Jackson scored a season high sixth place finish at Circuit Trois-Rivières and tied his career best seventh place points finish.

Jackson returned in 2025, driving the No. 85 in the Clarington 200. He returned to the No. 84 at Riverside International Speedway. He didn't run again until the inaugural race at Calabogie Motorsports Park.

On May 11, 2026, it was announced Jackson would compete full-time in the 2026 season.

== Personal life ==
When not racing, Jackson serves as the captain of the Mississauga Fire Department.

== Motorsports career results ==
=== NASCAR ===
(key) (Bold – Pole position awarded by qualifying time. Italics – Pole position earned by points standings or practice time. * – Most laps led.)

NASCAR Canada Series results
Year	Team	No.	Make	1	2	3	4	5	6	7	8	9	10	11	12	13	14	NCSC	Pts	Ref
2012	Brian Barton	81	Dodge	MSP; 16	ICAR; 12	MSP; 17	DEL; 18	MPS	EDM	SAS	CTR; 27	CGV; 22	BAR; 10	RIS; 13	KWA; 13			14th	284	
2013	Bray Autosport	98	Dodge	MSP; 22			ICAR; 23											14th	288	
2013	Bray Autosport	56	Dodge		DEL; 7	MSP; 20		MPS; 12	SAS; 16	ASE; 18	CTR	RIS; 13		BAR; 15	KWA; 26			14th	288	
2013	Bray Autosport	81	Dodge										MSP; 24					14th	288	
2014	Bray Autosport	56	Dodge	MSP	ACD	ICAR	EIR; 7	SAS; 13	ASE	CTR	RIS							19th	153	
2014	Bray Autosport	98	Dodge									MSP; 17	BAR; 16	KWA; 15				19th	153	
2015	Bray Autosport	98	Dodge	MSP; 24	ACD; 8	SUN; 13	ICAR	EIR	SAS	ASE; 13	CTR	RIS	MSP	KWA				24th	116	
2016	Brian Barton	84	Dodge	MSP; 13														10th	320	
2016	Canada's Best Racing Team	1	Ford		SUN; 3	ACD; 12								ASE; 6				10th	320	
2016	Canada's Best Racing Team	8	Dodge				ICAR; 17											10th	320	
2016	Canada's Best Racing Team	87	Dodge					TOR; 24										10th	320	
2016	Canada's Best Racing Team	25	Ford						EIR; 11	SAS					KWA; 11			10th	320	
2016	Canada's Best Racing Team	1	Dodge								CTR; 11	RIS						10th	320	
2016	Canada's Best Racing Team	25	Dodge										MSP; 12					10th	320	
2017	Canada's Best Racing Team	8	Dodge	MSP; 21		ACD; 10	ICAR; 7					CTR; 10	RIS; QL^{†}	MSP; 17	ASE			12th	284	
2017	Canada's Best Racing Team	25	Ford		DEL; 17											JUK; 7		12th	284	
2017	Canada's Best Racing Team	25	Dodge					TOR; 12	SAS	SAS								12th	284	
2017	DJK Racing	27	Dodge								EIR; 11							12th	284	
2018	Canada's Best Racing Team	25	Dodge	MSP; 17	JUK		TOR; 18											12th	319	
2018	Canada's Best Racing Team	1	Dodge			ACD; 10				EIR; 8								12th	319	
2018	Dumoulin Compétition	04	Dodge					SAS; 18	SAS; 18									12th	319	
2018	DJK Racing	28	Dodge								CTR; 13							12th	319	
2018	Canada's Best Racing Team	25	Dodge									RIS; 16						12th	319	
2018	Busch Motorsports	43	Dodge										MSP; 15					12th	319	
2018	Canada's Best Racing Team	1	Ford											ASE; 11	NHA			12th	319	
2018	Busch Motorsports	43	Ford													JUK; 21		12th	319	
2019	Canada's Best Racing Team	21	Dodge	MSP	JUK	ACD	TOR	SAS	SAS	EIR; 17	CTR; 15	RIS	MSP; 16	ASE	NHA	JUK		28th	84	
2020	Bray Autosport	98	Dodge	SUN; 7	SUN; 12	FLA; 10	FLA; 10											7th	212	
2020	Larry Jackson Racing	84	Dodge					JUK; 6	JUK; 7									7th	212	
2021	Larry Jackson Racing	84	Dodge	SUN; 10	SUN; 7	CTR; 11	ICAR; 14	MSP; 15	MSP; 20	FLA; 16	DEL; 11	DEL; 8	DEL; 10					10th	318	
2022	Larry Jackson Racing	84	Dodge	SUN; 17	MSP; 10	ACD; 11	AVE; 11	TOR; 25	EDM	SAS	SAS	CTR; 8	OSK; 14	ICAR; 13	MSP; 14	DEL; 12		15th	305	
2023	Larry Jackson Racing	84	Dodge	SUN; 9	MSP; 13	ACD; 9	AVE; 7	TOR; 13	EDM; 11	SAS; 15	SAS; 13	CTR; 11	OSK; 19	OSK; 8	ICAR; 13	MSP; 11	DEL; 11	9th	453	
2024	Larry Jackson Racing	84	Dodge	MSP; 17	ACD; 18	AVE; 9	RIS; 9	RIS; 9	OSK; 15	SAS; 9	EIR; 9	CTR; 6	ICAR	MSP; 11	DEL; 10	AMS; 14		7th	392	
2025	Larry Jackson Racing	85	Dodge	MSP; 21														9th	283	
2025	Larry Jackson Racing	84	Dodge		RIS; 10	EIR	SAS	CMP; 17	ACD; 10	CTR; 14	ICAR; 19	MSP; 27	DEL; 14	DEL; 14	AMS; 11			9th	283	
2026	Larry Jackson Racing	84	Dodge	MSP; 23	ACD; 13	ACD; 12	RIS; 8	AMS; 13	AMS; 14	CMP; 19	EIR; 9	EIR; 9	CTR; 12	MAR; 13	ICAR; 15	MSP; 26	DEL; 7	8th	423	
^{†} – Qualified but replaced by Joey McColm

^{*} Season still in progress
^{1} Ineligible for series points
