= NASCAR Canada Series at Autodrome Chaudière =

NASCAR Canada Series races in Vallée-Jonction, Quebec

NASCAR Canada Series at Chaudière
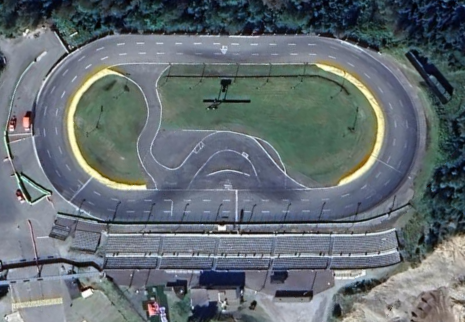

NASCAR Canada Series
- Venue: Autodrome Chaudière
- Location: Vallée-Jonction, Quebec; Canada
- First race: 2014
- Distance: 31.250 miles (50.292 km)
- Laps: 125
- Previous names: Budweiser 300 (2014–2015, 2019); CRS Express 300 (2016–2017); Bumper to Bumper 300 (2018); QwickWick 250 presented by St. Hubert (2022); Bud Light 300 (2023–2024); Bud Light 250 (2025)
- Most wins (driver): Marc-Antoine Camirand, Andrew Ranger (3)
- Most wins (team): Paillé Course//Racing (3)
- Most wins (manufacturer): Chevrolet (8)

Circuit information
- Surface: Asphalt
- Turns: 4

Stock car racing events in the NASCAR Canada Series have been held at Autodrome Chaudière in Vallée-Jonction, Quebec, Canada, about 65 km (40 mi) south of Quebec City, during numerous seasons and times of year since 2014.

== History ==
The NASCAR Canadian Tire Series first raced at Autodrome Chaudière in 2014. Jason Hathaway won the inaugural series race at the track, holding off Mark Dilley in a green-white-checkered finish. Hathaway would go on to win the second race at the track in 2015. Alex Labbé battled and held off Cayden Lapcevich to win the event in 2016, the first year of the series being branded as the Pinty's Series. Lapcevich would then hold off Labbé and win the race in 2017. Andrew Ranger won the race in 2018 after it was shortened due to rain. In his first career Pinty's Series start, Raphaël Lessard scored the win in 2019 in another rain shortened race, making him the first driver to win in their debut since Don Thomson Jr. in the inaugural series race. The race was originally scheduled to return in 2020, but was postponed due to the COVID-19 pandemic; the race was ultimately canceled. The track would not return to the schedule until 2022, where Ranger would score his second win at the track. Marc-Antoine Camirand won the race in 2023, although was hit with a post-race penalty and was docked eighteen points. Ranger scored his third win at the track in 2024, the first year of the series being branded as the Canada Series. Rookie Will Larue won the race in 2025 in just his fourth career start. This was the first time the race was not held in June; originally scheduled for May 31, the race was postponed to August 2 due to weather. In December 2025, it was announced the track would host a doubleheader in 2026. Marc-Antoine Camirand would sweep both races.

== Past winners ==
| Year | Date | No. | Driver | Team | Manufacturer | Race Distance | | Race Time | Average Speed (mph) | Report | Ref |
| Year | Date | No. | Driver | Team | Manufacturer | Laps | Miles (km) | Race Time | Average Speed (mph) | Report | Ref |
|---|---|---|---|---|---|---|---|---|---|---|---|
| 2014 | June 15 | 3 | Jason Hathaway | Ed Hakonson Racing | Chevrolet | 301* | 75.250 (121.10) | 1:19:23 | 56.876 | Report | |
| 2015 | June 13 | 3 | Jason Hathaway (2) | Ed Hakonson Racing (2) | Chevrolet (2) | 300 | 75.000 (120.70) | 1:31:18 | 49.288 | Report | |
| 2016 | June 24 | 32 | Alex Labbé | Go Fas Racing | Ford | 300 | 75.000 (120.70) | 1:26:24 | 52.083 | Report | |
| 2017 | June 25 | 76 | Cayden Lapcevich | Lapcevich Racing | Dodge | 310* | 77.500 (124.72) | 1:26:53 | 52.520 | Report | |
| 2018 | June 30 | 27 | Andrew Ranger | DJK Racing | Dodge (2) | 220* | 55.000 (88.51) | 1:06:04 | 49.950 | Report | |
| 2019 | June 29 | 07 | Raphaël Lessard | Dumoulin Compétition | Dodge (3) | 286* | 71.500 (115.07) | 1:40:46 | 42.574 | Report | |
| 2020* – 2021 | Not held | | | | | | | | | | |
| 2022 | June 11 | 27 | Andrew Ranger (2) | Wight Motorsports Inc. | Chevrolet (3) | 250 | 62.500 (100.58) | 1:26:23 | 43.411 | Report | |
| 2023 | June 10 | 96 | Marc-Antoine Camirand | Paillé Course//Racing | Chevrolet (4) | 300 | 75.000 (120.70) | 1:38:53 | 45.508 | Report | |
| 2024 | June 1 | 27 | Andrew Ranger (3) | Wight Motorsports Inc. (2) | Chevrolet (5) | 300 | 75.000 (120.70) | 1:28:51 | 50.647 | Report | |
| 2025 | August 2 | 45 | Will Larue | Larue Motorsports | Chevrolet (6) | 250 | 62.500 (100.58) | 1:17:22 | 48.470 | Report | |
| 2026 | June 7 | 96 | Marc-Antoine Camirand (2) | Paillé Course//Racing (2) | Chevrolet (7) | 125 | 31.250 (50.29) | 0:39:54 | 46.992 | Report | |
| 2026 | June 7 | 96 | Marc-Antoine Camirand (3) | Paillé Course//Racing (3) | Chevrolet (8) | 125 | 31.250 (50.29) | 0:37:57 | 49.407 | Report | |

Notes

- 2014: Race extended from 300 laps to 301 laps due to green/white/checker.
- 2017: Race extended from 300 laps to 310 laps due to overtime.
- 2018: Race shortened from 300 laps to 220 laps due to rain.
- 2019: Race shortened from 300 laps to 286 laps due to rain.
- 2020: Race canceled due to COVID-19 pandemic.

=== Manufacturer wins ===
| # Wins | Make | Years Won |
|---|---|---|
| 8 | (United States) Chevrolet | 2014–2015, 2022–2026 |
| 3 | (United States) Dodge | 2017–2019 |
| 1 | (United States) Ford | 2016 |

| Previous race: CarGurus 200 | NASCAR Canada Series; Bud Light 125/Michelob Ultra 125 | Next race: Pinty's 300 |
