= Ray Courtemanche Jr. =

Canadian racing driver

- Born: February 14, 1970 (age 56); Montreal, Quebec, Canada
- Awards: 2012 NASCAR Canadian Tire Series Most Popular Driver

NASCAR FedEx Freight Truck Series career
- 1 race run over 1 year
- 2014 position: 68th
- Best finish: 68th (2014)
- First race: 2014 Chevrolet Silverado 250 (Mosport)
Wins	Top tens	Poles
0	0	0

NASCAR Canada Series career
- 38 races run over 7 years
- Car no., team: No. 8 (Ed Hakonson Racing)
- 2015 position: 26th
- Best finish: 12th (2013)
- First race: 2011 Streets of Toronto 100 (Toronto)
- Last race: 2022 eBay Motors 200 (Mosport)
Wins	Top tens	Poles
0	1	0

Ray Courtemanche Jr. (born February 14, 1970) is a Canadian businessman and stock car racing driver. A veteran of the NASCAR Canadian Tire Series, he raced in the series from 2011 to 2015. He also competed in the NASCAR Camping World Truck Series, driving the No. 07 Chevrolet Silverado for SS-Green Light Racing.

== Racing career ==
Courtemanche began racing in the NASCAR Canadian Tire Series in 2011, competing on a part-time basis. After another limited schedule in 2012, during which he won the series' Most Popular Driver Award, he moved to a full-time slate in 2013 and finished 12th in points. During the 2013 season, he suffered an upper-body injury in a wreck at Canadian Tire Motorsport Park, leading to a brief hospitalisation.

In 2014, Courtemanche's Danam Bonzaï Racing team partnered with Scott Steckly's 22 Racing. In August, Courtemanche made his NASCAR Camping World Truck Series debut at Mosport with SS-Green Light Racing; he had tested a truck with the team at Virginia International Raceway earlier in the month.

== Personal life ==
Courtemanche operates Investissements Ray Junior Inc., a real estate firm that he started at the age of 17. In 2013, he contributed to the creation of La cité de Mirabel with Joe Amendola and Fred Dankoff. In 2019 Joe Amendola and Fred Dankoff severed the business relationship with the race car driver and offered him a lump sum to purchase his shares putting an end to an eight year association. Courtemanche net worth is estimated at $1 Million - $3 Million. La Cité de Mirabel, a real estate project located near Quebec Autoroute 15.

== Motorsports career results ==
=== NASCAR ===
(key) (Bold – Pole position awarded by qualifying time. Italics – Pole position earned by points standings or practice time. * – Most laps led.)

==== Camping World Truck Series ====
NASCAR Camping World Truck Series results
Year	Team	No.	Make	1	2	3	4	5	6	7	8	9	10	11	12	13	14	15	16	17	18	19	20	21	22	NCWTC	Pts	Ref
2014	SS-Green Light Racing	07	Chevy	DAY	MAR	KAN	CLT	DOV	TEX	GTW	KEN	IOW	ELD	POC	MCH	BRI	MSP; 20	CHI	NHA	LVS	TAL	MAR	TEX	PHO	HOM	68th	24	

==== K&N Pro Series East ====
NASCAR K&N Pro Series East results
Year	Team	No.	Make	1	2	3	4	5	6	7	8	9	10	11	12	13	14	NKNPSEC	Pts	Ref
2012	DGM Racing	72	Chevy	BRI; 31	GRE	RCH	IOW	BGS	JFC	LGY	CNB	COL	IOW	NHA	DOV	GRE	CAR	77th	13	
2013	MacDonald Motorsports	49	Toyota	BRI; 27	GRE	FIF	RCH	BGS	IOW	LGY	COL	IOW	VIR	GRE	NHA	DOV	RAL	74th	17	

==== Pinty's Series ====
NASCAR Canadian Tire Series results
Year	Team	No.	Make	1	2	3	4	5	6	7	8	9	10	11	12	13	NCTSC	Pts	Ref
2011	Danam Bonzaï Racing	29	Dodge	MSP	ICAR	DEL	MSP	TOR; 29	MPS	SAS	CTR; 29	CGV; 36	BAR	RIS	KWA		44th	207	
2012	Danam Bonzaï Racing	29	Dodge	MSP; 27	ICAR; 15	MSP; 15	DEL; 16	MPS	EDM	SAS	CTR; 26	CGV; 32	BAR; 19	RIS; 14	KWA; 18		16th	214	
2013	Danam Bonzaï Racing	29	Dodge	MSP; 12	DEL; 15	MSP; 15	ICAR; 17	MPS; 16	SAS; 19	ASE; 13	CTR; 19	RIS; 12	MSP; 28	BAR; 11	KWA; 22		12th	329	
2014	Danam Bonzaï Racing	29	Dodge	MSP; 10		ICAR; 17	EIR	SAS		CTR; 12	RIS	MSP; 24	BAR	KWA			15th	170	
2014	22 Racing	24	Dodge		ACD; 17				ASE; 14								15th	170	
2015	Danam Bonzaï Racing	29	Dodge	MSP; 20	ACD	SUN	ICAR; 18	EIR	SAS	ASE	CTR; 25	RIS	MSP; 18	KWA			26th	95	
2021	Jamie Hakonson	8	Chevy	SUN	SUN	CTR; 12	ICAR; 13	MSP; 17	MSP; 15	FLA	DEL	DEL	DEL				22nd	119	
2022	Ed Hakonson	8	Chevy	SUN	MSP; 23	ACD	AVE	TOR; 15	EDM	SAS	SAS	CTR; 9	OSK	ICAR; 15	MSP; 16	DEL	24th	142	
