= Sam Fellows =

Canadian racing driver (born 1993)

- Born: December 10, 1993 (age 32); Toronto, Ontario, Canada

NASCAR Canada Series career
- 36 races run over 6 years
- Car no., team: No. 87 (Fellows McGraw Racing)
- 2026 position: 24th
- Best finish: 13th (2021)
- First race: 2021 Guardian Angels 60 Presented by Dermathermes (Trois-Rivières)
- Last race: 2026 WeatherTech 200 (Mosport)
Wins	Top tens	Poles
0	5	0
- Statistics up to date as of September 13, 2026.

Sam Fellows (born December 10, 1993) is a Canadian professional stock car racing driver. He currently competes part-time in the NASCAR Canada Series, driving the No. 87 Chevrolet for Fellows McGraw Racing. He is the son of fellow driver Ron Fellows.

== Racing career ==
Fellows spent a brief period racing karts before moving to cars as a teenager. Fellows competed in Ontario regional endurance racing for three seasons, scoring seven podiums and three wins. He was the 2017 champion of the CASC GT Challenge Championship. In 2018, he joined Pfaff Motorsports in the Canadian Touring Car Championship, winning in his debut. He would sign with the team again in 2019 to drive in the Porsche GT3 Cup Challenge Canada, where he won the Gold Class championship. During the COVID-19 pandemic, Fellows focused on sim racing.

In 2021, it was announced Fellows would compete in the remaining eight NASCAR Piny's Series races in the No. 98 Jim Bray Motorsports with Mike Curb entry, starting at the Circuit Trois-Rivières. In his debut, he would finish in 20th. Fellows would go on to finish second in the Rookie of the Year standings. Fellows returned to the No. 98 in 2022, running nine races and scoring two top-ten finishes. In 2023, it was announced Fellows would return to the series, this time driving the No. 87 Chevrolet for the newly formed Fellows McGraw Racing. In five races, he scored a best finish of 11th. In 2024, FMR announced that Fellows would compete in the season's road courses. Fellows scored a career-best fourth place finish at Canadian Tire Motorsport Park. For 2025, the team again announced that Fellows would drive the No. 87 at all of the season's road courses. In the 2025 WeatherTech 200, Fellows, who had led the most laps, was leading on the final lap when he was moved by defending champion Marc-Antoine Camirand, and would go on to finish third.

== Motorsports career results ==
=== NASCAR ===
(key) (Bold – Pole position awarded by qualifying time. Italics – Pole position earned by points standings or practice time. * – Most laps led.)

==== Canada Series ====
NASCAR Canada Series results
Year	Team	No.	Make	1	2	3	4	5	6	7	8	9	10	11	12	13	14	NCSC	Pts	Ref
2021	Jim Bray Motorsports with Mike Curb	98	Chevrolet	SUN	SUN	CTR; 20	ICAR; 12	MSP; 14	MSP; 13	FLA; 14	DEL; 15	DEL; 11	DEL; 12					13th	241	
2022	Jim Bray Motorsports	98	Chevrolet	SUN; 13	MSP; 25	ACD; 15	AVE	TOR; 14	EDM	SAS	SAS	CTR; 6	OSK; 15	ICAR; 23	MSP; 9	DEL; 27		19th	249	
2023	Fellows McGraw Racing	87	Chevrolet	SUN	MSP	ACD; 11	AVE	TOR; 16	EIR	SAS	SAS	CTR; 15	OSK	OSK	ICAR; 12	MSP; 17	DEL	20th	149	
2024	Fellows McGraw Racing	87	Chevrolet	MSP; 4	ACD	AVE	RIS	RIS	OSK	SAS	EIR	CTR; 28	ICAR; 15	MSP; 21	DEL	AMS		25th	108	
2025	Fellows McGraw Racing	87	Chevrolet	MSP; 20	RIS	EDM	SAS	CMP; 11	ACD	CTR; 21	ICAR	MSP; 3*	DEL	DEL	AMS			21st	123	
2026	Fellows McGraw Racing	87	Chevrolet	MSP; 17	ACD	ACD	RIS	AMS	AMS	CMP; 9	EIR	EIR	CTR; 28	MAR; 21	ICAR; 24	MSP; 18	DEL	24th	147	

^{*} Season still in progress
^{1} Ineligible for series points
