= Glenn Styres =

Canadian racing driver (born 1964)

- Born: April 26, 1964 (age 62); Ohsweken, Ontario, Canada

NASCAR Canada Series career
- 52 races run over 6 years
- Car no., team: No. 0 (Glenn Styres Racing)
- 2026 position: 19th
- Best finish: 8th (2024)
- First race: 2021 QwickWick 125 (Delaware)
- Last race: 2026 WeatherTech 200 (Mosport)
Wins	Top tens	Poles
0	2	0
- Statistics up to date as of September 13, 2026.

Glenn Styres (born April 26, 1964) is a Canadian professional stock car racing driver. He competes part-time in the NASCAR Canada Series, driving the No. 0 Chevrolet for his own team, Glenn Styres Racing. Styres and his family own and operate Ohsweken Speedway, a track he began construction on in 1994. Styres won North American Sprint Car Promoter of the Year eight times and has won championships in Southern Ontario Sprints and at Ohsweken Speedway. He was inducted into the Canadian Motorsport Hall of Fame in 2021 and the North American Indigenous Athletics Hall of Fame in 2023.

== Racing career ==
Styres began his racing career in 2000. He attempted to debut at Rolling Wheels Raceway Park in what is now the DIRTcar Sportsman Series, but finished 31st after failing to start the event. He finished 23rd in a race at Merrittville Speedway in 2001.

Styres made a start in the X-1R Pro Cup Series in 2002, finishing twentieth in a race at Jukasa Motor Speedway. He would also make a start in the NASCAR Goody's Dash Series, finishing 18th in a race at Atlanta Motor Speedway's 1/4 mile infield oval.

Styres began racing sprint cars in 2003, finishing 21st in an Empire Super Series race at his own track and eighth in a Bobcat of Buffalo Patriot Sprint Group race at Humberstone Speedway.

Styres continued running sprint cars in 2004, attempting to qualify for the Knoxville Nationals, as well as racing in the Empire Super Sprint Series, Bobcat of Buffalo Patriot Sprint Group, and Cox Design and Metal Fabrication Southern Iowa SprintWeek. Styres continued running in these series in 2005, as well as debuting in the World of Outlaws Sprint Car Series.

2006 saw Styres continue racing in sprint cars, including making his debut in the Engine Pro ASCS Sprints on Dirt presented by Victor Reinz. He made his first Chili Bowl Nationals attempt in 2007. Over the next few years, he continued racing in various series, and his 2009 scored his first win in the aforementioned Sprints on Dirt series, winning at his own Ohsweken Speedway. He scored his first Empire Super Sprints win in 2010, again winning at Ohsweken. He continued participating in various other series, including World of Outlaws.

Styres continued competing in various dirt racing series in the United States and Canada between 2011 and 2017, but scaled back in 2018, and failed to qualify for his only Patriot Sprint Tour attempt that season. He also withdrew from his planned NASCAR Pinty's Series debut, where he would have driven the No. 25 Ford at Jukasa. Styres failed to qualify for a few more sprint car races in 2019, where he was attempting to compete at his own Ohsweken Speedway. In 2020, he competed in the East Bay Winternationals.

In 2021, Styres was able to make his Pinty's series debut at Delaware Speedway. He would move to the series full-time in 2022, where he scored a best finish of 13th at Sutherland Automotive Speedway and finished 14th in the standings.

Styres continued competing in sprint car races in 2023, as well as running late model races. He competed in four NASCAR Advance Auto Parts Weekly Series races in the D-II region. He also returned to the Pinty's Series full time, where he picked up his first career top-ten finish at Ohsweken Speedway and again finished 14th in the standings.

Styres continued running in various racing series in 2024. In the now NASCAR Canada Series, he finished a career high eighth in points and picked up another top-ten at Sutherland Automotive Speedway.

In 2025, Styres scaled back to a part-time schedule in the Canada Series, only competing in three of the season's 12 events, with a best finish of 15th twice.

== Motorsports career results ==
=== NASCAR ===
(key) (Bold – Pole position awarded by qualifying time. Italics – Pole position earned by points standings or practice time. * – Most laps led.)

==== Canada Series ====
NASCAR Canada Series results
Year	Team	No.	Make	1	2	3	4	5	6	7	8	9	10	11	12	13	14	NCSC	Pts	Ref
2018	Bud Morris	25	Ford	MSP	JUK; Wth	ACD	TOR	SAS	SAS	EIR	CTR	RIS	MSP	ASE	NHA	JUK		N/A	0	
2021	Wight Motorsports Inc.	19	Chevy	SUN	SUN	CTR	ICAR	MSP	MSP	FLA	DEL	DEL; 14	DEL; 14					31st	60	
2022	Wight Motorsports Inc.	0	Chevy	SUN; 19	MSP; 18	ACD; 23	AVE; 18	TOR; 24	EDM; 16	SAS; 17	SAS; 13	CTR; 22	OSK; 23	ICAR; 20	MSP; 17	DEL; 22		14th	320	
2023	Wight Motorsports Inc.	0	Chevy	SUN; 21	MSP; 20	ACD; 21	AVE; 14	TOR; 21	EIR; 13	SAS; 16	SAS; 18	CTR; 17	OSK; 24	OSK; 10	ICAR; 25	MSP; 20	DEL; 20	14th	356	
2024	Glenn Styres Racing	0	Chevy	MSP; 19	ACD; 16	AVE; 11	RIS; 13	RIS; 15	OSK; 18	SAS; 8	EIR; 12	CTR; 26	ICAR; 14	MSP; 14	DEL; 12	AMS; 23		8th	372	
2025	Glenn Styres Racing	0	Chevy	MSP; 17	RIS	EDM	SAS	CMP	ACD	CTR	ICAR	MSP; 15	DEL	DEL	AMS; 15			28th	85	
2026	Glenn Styres Racing	0	Chevy	MSP; 25	ACD; 18	ACD; 13	RIS	AMS; 14	AMS; 13	CMP	EIR	EIR	CTR	MAR; 22	ICAR	MSP; 38	DEL	19th	165	

^{*} Season still in progress
^{1} Ineligible for series points
