= Jean-Philippe Bergeron (racing driver) =

Canadian professional stock car racing driver

- Born: August 18, 1999 (age 27); Saint-Donat, Lanaudière, Quebec, Canada

NASCAR Canada Series career
- 41 races run over 5 years
- Car no., team: No. 1 (Prolon Racing Team)
- 2026 position: 26th
- Best finish: 8th (2023)
- First race: 2022 NTN Ultimate Bearing Experience 250 (Sunset)
- Last race: 2026 WeatherTech 200 (Mosport)
Wins	Top tens	Poles
0	21	0

ARCA Menards Series career
- 2 races run over 1 year
- Best finish: 50th (2021)
- First race: 2021 Sioux Chief PowerPEX (Salem)
- Last race: 2021 Reese's 150 (Kansas)
Wins	Top tens	Poles
0	2	0

ARCA Menards Series West career
- 1 race run over 1 year
- Best finish: 44th (2021)
- First race: 2021 Arizona Lottery 100 (Phoenix)
Wins	Top tens	Poles
0	1	0
- Statistics up to date as of September 13, 2026.

Jean-Philippe "J. P." Bergeron (born August 18, 1999) is a Canadian professional stock car racing driver. He currently competes part-time in the NASCAR Canada Series, driving the No. 1 Ford for Prolon Racing Team.

== Racing career ==
=== Early years ===
Bergeron would get his start at the age of thirteen, racing go-karts. In 2015, he would compete in the Cup Lites Series in Canada, winning Rookie of the Year. In 2017, he would first compete in the ACT Late Model Tour, with him winning Rookie of the Year in 2018. In 2019, he would sign with the Prolon Racing Team with the help from his dad. In 2021, it was announced that he would drive in the RS1 Cup Series for Avion Motorsports.

=== ARCA Menards Series ===
Bergeron would sign with David Gilliland Racing for three race, with two ARCA Menards Series races and one ARCA Menards Series West race. He would first make his debut with David Gilliland Racing at the 2021 Sioux Chief PowerPEX 200, finishing eighth. He would achieve a top-five at the next race, finishing fifth at the 2021 Reese's 150. He would garner another top-five finish in his ARCA Menards Series West debut, also finishing fifth.

== Personal life ==
Bergeron's father, Marc, owns the Prolon Racing Team, which helps field Jean-Philippe.

== Motorsports career results ==
=== NASCAR ===
(key) (Bold – Pole position awarded by qualifying time. Italics – Pole position earned by points standings or practice time. * – Most laps led.)

==== Canada Series ====
NASCAR Pinty's Series results
Year	Team	No.	Make	1	2	3	4	5	6	7	8	9	10	11	12	13	NPSC	Pts	Ref
2022	Jacombs Racing	1	Ford	SUN; 8	MSP; 9	ACD; 18	AVE; 9	TOR; 13	EDM; 11	SAS; 10	SAS; 8	CTR; 13	OSK; 24	ICAR; 22	MSP; 10	DEL; 7	10th	410	

=== ARCA Menards Series ===
(key) (Bold – Pole position awarded by qualifying time. Italics – Pole position earned by points standings or practice time. * – Most laps led. ** – All laps led.)

ARCA Menards Series results
Year	Team	No.	Make	1	2	3	4	5	6	7	8	9	10	11	12	13	14	15	16	17	18	19	20	AMSC	Pts	Ref
2021	David Gilliland Racing	46	Ford	DAY	PHO	TAL	KAN	TOL	CLT	MOH	POC	ELK	BLN	IOW	WIN	GLN	MCH	ISF	MLW	DSF	BRI	SLM; 8	KAN; 5	50th	75	

==== ARCA Menards Series West ====
ARCA Menards Series West results
Year	Team	No.	Make	1	2	3	4	5	6	7	8	9	AMSWC	Pts	Ref
2021	David Gilliland Racing	46	Ford	PHO	SON	IRW	CNS	IRW	PIR	LVS	AAS	PHO; 5	44th	39	
