= 2022 NASCAR Pinty's Series =

16th season of the NASCAR Pinty's Series

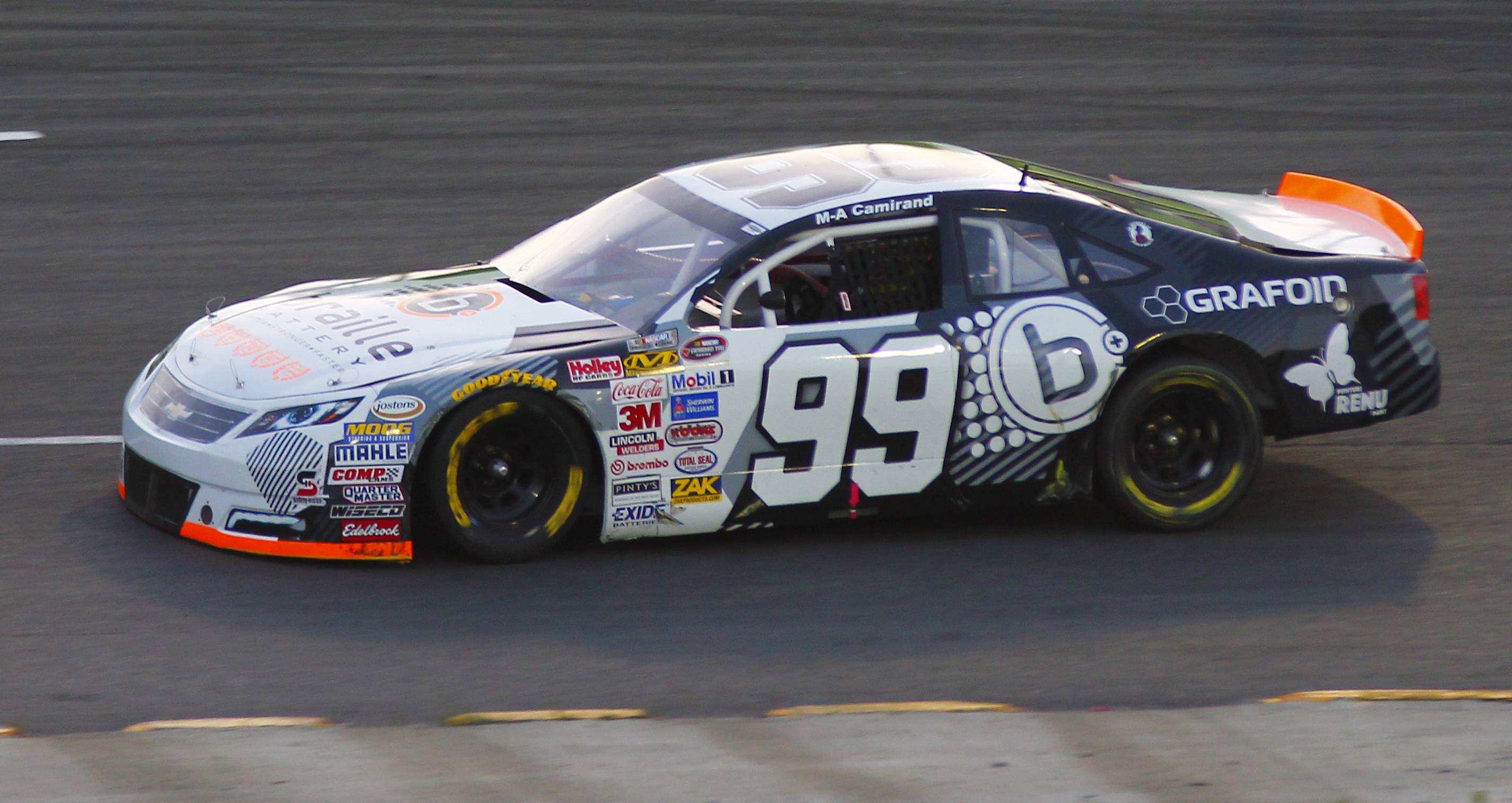
Marc-Antoine Camirand, the 2022 Pinty's Series champion.

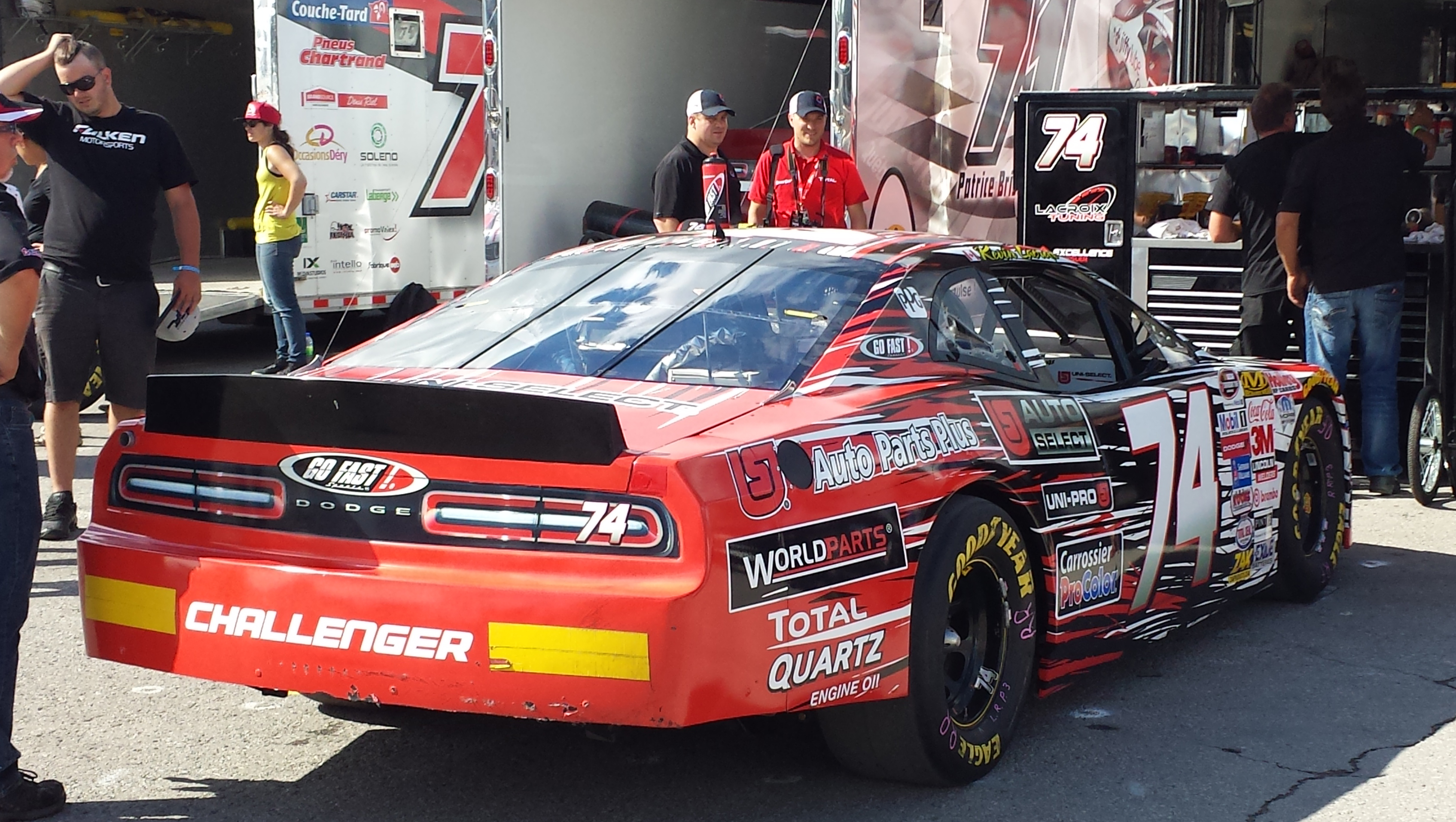
Kevin Lacroix finished second behind Camirand in the championship by 27 points.

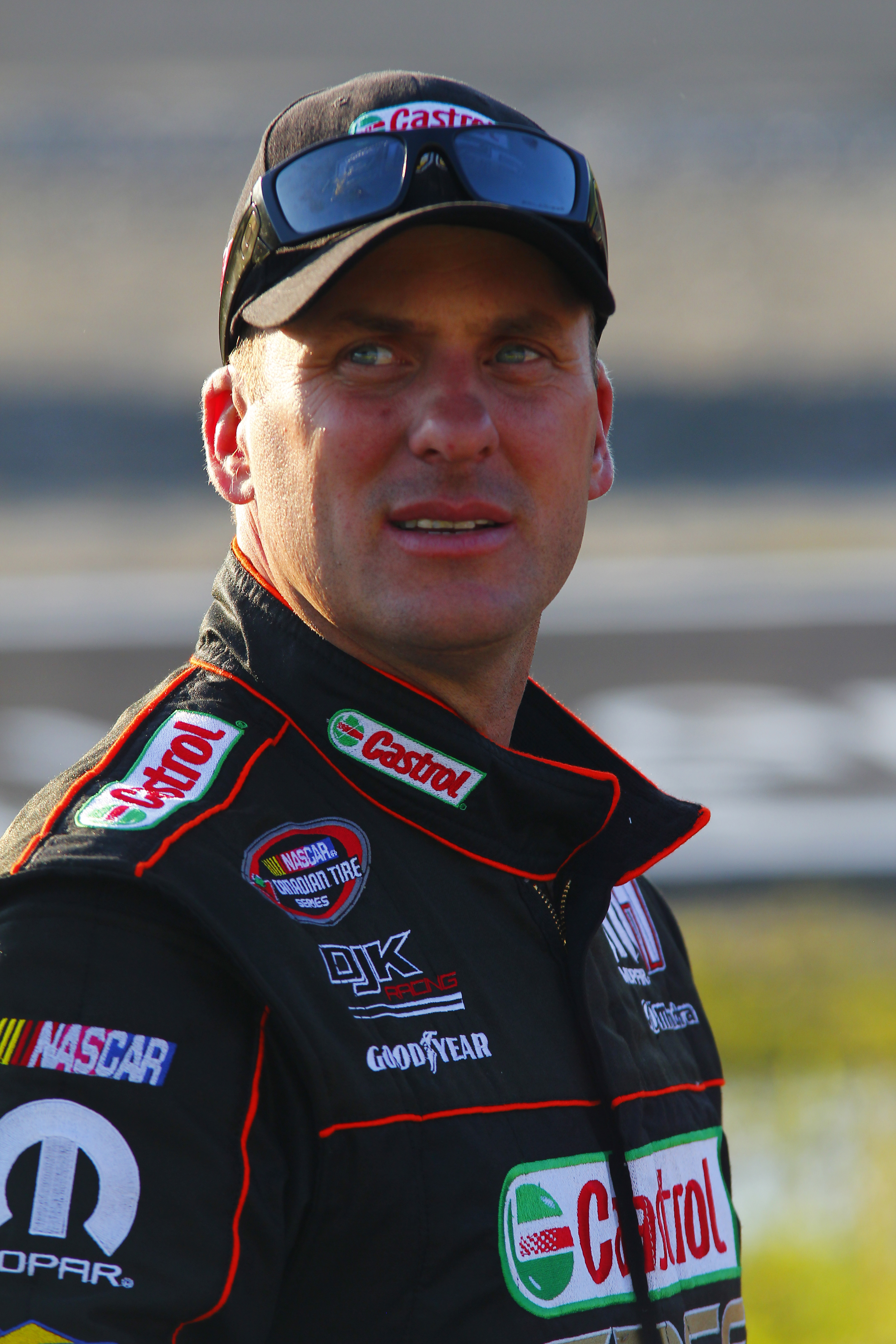
D. J. Kennington, the 2010 and 2012 series champion, finished third in the championship.

The 2022 NASCAR Pinty's Series was the sixteenth season of the Pinty's Series, the national stock car racing series in Canada sanctioned by NASCAR. It began with the NTN Ultimate Bearing Experience 250 at Sunset Speedway on May 14 and concluded with the race at Delaware Speedway on September 25.

Louis-Philippe Dumoulin entered the season as the defending series champion. Marc-Antoine Camirand won the championship, his first title in the Pinty's series.

== Teams and drivers ==
=== Complete schedule ===
Manufacturer	Team	No.	Driver
Chevrolet	Team 3 Red/Ed Hakonson Racing	8	Raphaël Lessard 8
Chevrolet	Team 3 Red/Ed Hakonson Racing	8	Ray Courtemanche Jr. 5
Chevrolet	Team 3 Red/Ed Hakonson Racing	66	Wallace Stacey (R)
Chevrolet	Team 3 Red/Ed Hakonson Racing	92	Dexter Stacey
Chevrolet	Paille Racing Team	96	Marc-Antoine Camirand
Chevrolet	Wight Motorsports	0	Glenn Styres (R)
Chevrolet	Wight Motorsports	9	Brandon Watson (R)
Chevrolet	Wight Motorsports	27	Andrew Ranger
Chevrolet	Wight Motorsports	64	Mark Dilley 12
Chevrolet	Wight Motorsports	64	Jake Sheridan (R) 1
Chevrolet	22 Racing	18	Alex Tagliani
Chevrolet	22 Racing	20	Treyten Lapcevich
Dodge	DJK Racing	17	D. J. Kennington
Dodge	Dumoulin Compétition	47	Louis-Philippe Dumoulin
Dodge	Lacroix Motorsport	74	Kevin Lacroix
Dodge	Legendary Motorcar Company	59	Gary Klutt
Ford	Jacombs Racing	1	Jean-Philippe Bergeron (R)

=== Limited schedule ===
Manufacturer	Team	No.	Driver	Round(s)
Chevrolet	Dumoulin Compétition	13	Louis-Philippe Montour (R)	5
Chevrolet	Team 3 Red/Ed Hakonson Racing	3	Brett Taylor	8
Chevrolet	Team 3 Red/Ed Hakonson Racing	3	Dominic St. Cyr (R)	1
Chevrolet	Team 3 Red/Ed Hakonson Racing	3	Ken Schrader	1
Chevrolet	Team 3 Red/Ed Hakonson Racing	3	Jake Sheridan (R)	1
Chevrolet	Groupe Theetge	80	Donald Theetge	6
Chevrolet	Jim Bray Motorsports	56	Brandon McFarlane (R)	1
Chevrolet	Jim Bray Motorsports	98	Sam Fellows	9
Chevrolet	Krzysik Racing	46	Jamie Krzysik	3
Chevrolet	MBS Motorsports	31	Daniel Bois (R)	4
Chevrolet	RGR Motorsports	38	Michael Goudie (R)	1
Chevrolet	Wight Motorsports	2	T. J. Rinomato	10
Chevrolet	22 Racing	22	Kyle Steckly (R)	3
Chevrolet	22 Racing	22	Stewart Friesen	1
Dodge	Brent Wheller Motorsports	61	Brent Wheller	3
Dodge	Bryan Cathcart Racing	71	Bryan Cathcart	11
Dodge	Busch Racing	43	Shantel Kalika	3
Dodge	DJK Racing	28	Sara Thorne (R)	1
Dodge	DJK Racing	28	Matthew Shirley (R)	2
Dodge	DJK Racing	28	Trevor Monaghan	1
Dodge	Dumoulin Compétition	04	Jean-François Dumoulin	1
Dodge	Dumoulin Compétition	07	Jacques Villeneuve	1
Dodge	Dumoulin Compétition	07	Alex Labbé	1
Dodge	ICAR Canada Racing Team 1; 22 Racing 1	03	Justin Arseneau (R)	1
Dodge	ICAR Canada Racing Team 1; 22 Racing 1	03	Ray Morneau (R)	1
Dodge	Lacroix Motorsport	55	Serge Bourdeau (R)	2
Dodge	Legendary Motorcar Company	6	Peter Klutt	2
Dodge	Legendary Motorcar Company	6	Ryan Klutt	1
Dodge	Larry Jackson Racing	84	Larry Jackson	10
Dodge	Larry Jackson Racing	99	Matthew Scannell	3
Dodge	Larry Jackson Racing	99	Aaron Turkey (R)	1
Dodge	Duroking Autosport	12	Mathieu Kingsbury	4
Dodge	Monaghan Motosports	4	Trevor Monaghan	1
Dodge	SDV Autosport	37	Simon Dion-Viens	2
Ford	Jacombs Racing	36	David Bailey (R)	1
Ford	Jacombs Racing	36	Alex Labbé	1
Ford	Jacombs Racing	39	Alex Guenette	4

== Schedule ==
On 9 December 2021, NASCAR announced the 2022 schedule. It included an inaugural race at Ohsweken Speedway, which will become the first dirt track race in series history, after being cancelled for the 2020 season, as well as one at Eastbound International Speedway. It also brought the return of the west coast swing for the series.

No.	Race title	Track	Date
1	NTN Ultimate Bearing Experience 250	Sunset Speedway, Innisfil	14 May
2	eBay Motors 200	Canadian Tire Motorsport Park, Bowmanville	22 May
3	QwickWick 250 presented by St. Hubert	Autodrome Chaudière, Vallée-Jonction	11 June
4	Pro Line 225 presented by QwickWick	Eastbound International Speedway, Avondale	25 June
5	Grand Prix of Toronto	Exhibition Place, Toronto	15 July
6	Bayer 300	Edmonton International Raceway, Wetaskiwin	23 July
7	Leland Industries Twin 125's	Sutherland Automotive Speedway, Saskatoon	27 July
8	Leland Industries Twin 125's	Sutherland Automotive Speedway, Saskatoon	27 July
9	Les 60 Tours Rousseau Metal	Circuit Trois-Rivières, Trois-Rivières	7 August
10	Pinty's 100	Ohsweken Speedway, Ohsweken	16 August
11	General Tire 125	Circuit ICAR, Mirabel	27 August
12	WeatherTech 200	Canadian Tire Motorsport Park, Bowmanville	4 September
13	Pinty's Fall Brawl	Delaware Speedway, Delaware	25 September

== Results and standings ==
=== Races ===
No.	Race	Pole position	Most laps led	Winning driver	Manufacturer	Report
1	NTN Ultimate Bearing Experience 250	Brandon Watson	Marc-Antoine Camirand	Treyten Lapcevich	Chevrolet	Report
2	eBay Motors 200	Louis-Philippe Dumoulin	Kevin Lacroix	Kevin Lacroix	Dodge	Report
3	QwickWick 250	Louis-Philippe Dumoulin	Marc-Antoine Camirand	Andrew Ranger	Chevrolet	Report
4	Pro-Line 225	Brandon Watson	Marc-Antoine Camirand	Marc-Antoine Camirand	Chevrolet	Report
5	Grand Prix of Toronto	Andrew Ranger	Kevin Lacroix	Kevin Lacroix	Dodge	Report
6	Bayer 300	Alex Tagliani	Marc-Antoine Camirand	Marc-Antoine Camirand	Chevrolet	Report
7	Leland Industries Twin 125s - Race 1	Treyten Lapcevich	Andrew Ranger	D. J. Kennington	Dodge	Report
8	Leland Industries Twin 125s - Race 2	Donald Theetge	Alex Tagliani	Alex Tagliani	Chevrolet	Report
9	Les 60 Tours Rousseau Metals	Kevin Lacroix	Marc-Antoine Camirand	Alex Guenette	Ford	Report
10	Pinty's 100	Marc-Antoine Camirand	Treyten Lapcevich	Treyten Lapcevich	Chevrolet	Report
11	General Tire 125	Marc-Antoine Camirand	Kevin Lacroix	Kevin Lacroix	Dodge	Report
12	WeatherTech 200	Marc-Antoine Camirand	Marc-Antoine Camirand	Marc-Antoine Camirand	Chevrolet	Report
13	Pinty's Fall Brawl	Brandon Watson	Brandon Watson	Brandon Watson	Chevrolet	Report

=== Drivers' championship ===
(key) Bold – Pole position awarded by time. Italics – Pole position set by final practice results or Owners' points. ^{L} –Led race lap (1 point). * – Led most race laps (1 point). (R) - Rookie of the Year candidate.

Pos.	Driver	SUN	MSP	ACD	AVE	TOR	EDM	SAS	SAS	CTR	OSK	ICAR	MSP	DEL	Points
1	Marc-Antoine Camirand	4^{L}*	14^{L}	2^{L}*	1^{L}*	9	1^{L}*	3	20	3^{L}*	**4**^{L}	2^{L}	**1**^{L}*	9	523
2	Kevin Lacroix	5	1^{L}*	13	7	1^{L}*	2^{L}	21	7	**19**	11	1^{L}*	2^{L}	3	496
3	D. J. Kennington	11	11	3^{L}	3	11	7^{L}	1^{L}	6	2	6	12	7	5^{L}	494
4	Treyten Lapcevich	1^{L}	6	21	2^{L}	10	17	**5**^{L}	17	5	1^{L}*	8	5	4	480
5	Alex Tagliani	7	2	5	15	5	**18**^{L}	7	1^{L}*	4	5	7	6	20	476
6	Brandon Watson **(R)**	**3**^{L}	8	9	4^{L}	16	6	16	5	12	10	9	11	**1**^{L}*	469
7	Louis-Philippe Dumoulin	9	7^{L}	**4**^{L}	19	3^{L}	4	8	3	14	18	6	4	8	468
8	Andrew Ranger	12	24	1^{L}	20^{L}	**2**^{L}	3	2^{L}*	2^{L}	15^{L}	7	5	8^{L}	19	463
9	Gary Klutt	6	4^{L}	7	5	4	8	14	21	11	9	21	3	26	434
10	Jean-Philippe Bergeron **(R)**	8	9	18	9	13	11	10	8	13	24	22	10	7	410
11	Dexter Stacey	18	3	19	6	19	9	6	22	20	16	10	13	10	401
12	Mark Dilley	10	15	12	10	21	12	12	9	17		19	22	23	346
13	Wallace Stacey **(R)**	16	19	17	14	20	13	20	18	23	20	18	19	18	337
14	Glenn Styres **(R)**	19	18	23	18	24	16	17	13	22	23	20	17	22	320
15	Larry Jackson	17	10	11	11	25				8	14	13	14	12	305
16	Bryan Cathcart	14	20	16	12	22	19	19	16		17		20	13	296
17	Raphaël Lessard	2^{L}		6	8		15	15	4		21			14	268
18	T. J. Rinomato	15	16	20	13	18		23	23	10			25	25	252
19	Sam Fellows	13	25	15		14				6	15	23	9	27	249
20	Brett Taylor	20	13	8	22		20	9	15				21		224
21	Donald Theetge	Wth		21	21	Wth	5	22	**10**^{L}					2	184
22	Louis-Philippe Montour **(R)**		5			8				7		11	15		174
23	Alex Guenette					6				1^{L}		3	26		144
24	Ray Courtemanche Jr.		23			15				9		15	16		142
25	Daniel Bois **(R)**		11			7							12	24	121
26	Mathieu Kingsbury			14						18		14		21	109
27	Kyle Steckly **(R)**							4	12					16	100
28	Jamie Krzysik						10	13	19						90
29	Shantel Kalika						14	18	11						89
30	Alex Labbé											4		6	78
31	Brent Wheller		21			17							18		76
32	Matthew Scannell		22			12							23		75
33	Jake Sheridan **(R)**										3			11	74
34	Matthew Shirley **(R)**							11	14						63
35	Simon Dions-Viens			10						21					57
36	Trevor Monaghan										22			15	51
37	Peter Klutt		17			23									48
38	Serge Bourdeau **(R)**									25		17			46
39	Stewart Friesen										2				42
40	Ken Schrader										8				36
41	David Bailey **(R)**										12				32
42	Aaron Turkey **(R)**										13				31
43	Jean-François Dumoulin									16^{L}					29
44	Brandon McFarlane **(R)**				16										28
45	Justin Arseneau **(R)**											16			28
46	Sara Thorne **(R)**				17										27
47	Ray Morneau **(R)**													17	27
48	Michael Goudie **(R)**										19				25
49	Dominic St. Cyr **(R)**									24					20
50	Ryan Klutt												24		20
51	Jacques Villeneuve									DNS					18
Pos.	Driver	SUN	MSP	ACD	AVE	TOR	EDM	SAS	SAS	CTR	OSK	ICAR	MSP	DEL	Points

== See also ==
- 2022 NASCAR Cup Series
- 2022 NASCAR Xfinity Series
- 2022 NASCAR Camping World Truck Series
- 2022 ARCA Menards Series
- 2022 ARCA Menards Series East
- 2022 ARCA Menards Series West
- 2022 NASCAR Whelen Modified Tour
- 2022 NASCAR Mexico Series
- 2022 NASCAR Whelen Euro Series
- 2022 SRX Series
- 2022 CARS Tour
- 2022 SMART Modified Tour
