= 2015 NASCAR Canadian Tire Series =

NASCAR season

Seasons
- ← 2014 2016 →

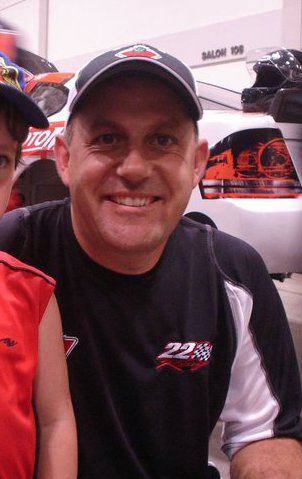
Scott Steckly, the 2015 champion

The 2015 NASCAR Canadian Tire Series was the ninth season of the NASCAR Canadian Tire Series, which took place in the summer of 2015. The season consisted of 11 races at 10 different venues, of which 7 were held on ovals. It began with the Pinty's presents the Clarington 200 at Canadian Tire Motorsport Park on May 17 and ended with the Pinty's 250 at Kawartha Speedway on September 19. Louis-Philippe Dumoulin entered the season as the defending Drivers' Champion; 2015 was the final season that Canadian Tire sponsored the series, with Pinty's taking over the title sponsorship from 2016.

Scott Steckly won his fourth series championship by four points, holding off an end-of-season points surge by Jason Hathaway. After taking three top-five finishes in the first four races, Steckly won back-to-back events at Edmonton and Saskatoon, before adding a third win at Antigonish and ultimately sealed the championship with second place in the final race. Hathaway won at Chaudière before winning the final two races to close in on Steckly. Andrew Ranger completed the championship top-3, 14 points in arrears of Hathaway. Ranger won one race during the season, winning at Saint-Eustache. Rookie Kevin Lacroix was the only other driver to win more than once; he won two Quebec races at Circuit ICAR and Circuit Trois-Rivières. Gary Klutt (Canadian Tire Motorsport Park) and Alex Tagliani (Sunset Speedway) completed the season's winners, the former taking Rookie of the Year honors ahead of Marc-Antoine Camirand.

== Drivers ==
No.	Manufacturer	Car Owner	Race Driver	Crew Chief
00	Chevrolet	Derek White	Kevin O'Connell (R) 1	Vic Decker
00	Chevrolet	Derek White	Derek White 1	Vic Decker
00	Chevrolet	Derek White	Paul Jean (R) 1	Vic Decker
00	Chevrolet	Derek White	Olivier Bedard (R) 1	Vic Decker
00	Chevrolet	Derek White	Brandon White 1	Simone Charron
01	Chevrolet	Dennis LaForce	Dennis LaForce (R) 1	Jim McIntosh
02	Ford	Susan Micks	Kerry Micks 4	Rino Montanari
02	Ford	Susan Micks	Mark Dilley 7	Rino Montanari
03	Dodge	Marc Arseneau	Elie Arseneau 1	Julien Jousse
3	Chevrolet	Ed Hakonson	Jason Hathaway	Craig Masters
04	Dodge	Eric Kerub	Jean-François Dumoulin	Eric Laperle
5	Chevrolet 1	Kevin Dowler	Noel Dowler 4	Dave Jacombs
5	Dodge 3	Kevin Dowler	Noel Dowler 4	Dave Jacombs
06	Dodge	Carlos de Quesada	Carlos de Quesada (R) 2	Ron Easton
8	Ford	Bud Morris	Kevin Poitras (R) 1	Rob White
09	Chevrolet	Trevor Seibert	Ryley Seibert 1	Al Lebert
9	Dodge	Susan Micks	Dwayne Baker (R) 4	Ray McCaughui
10	Dodge	Pat Ryder	D. J. Casey 1	Greg Yeomans
11	Dodge	Charles Harvey	Charles Harvey (R) 1	Al Lebert
14	Chevrolet	James Van Domselaar	James Van Domselaar 4	Steve Yakimchuk
17	Dodge	Doug Kennington	D. J. Kennington	Dave Wight
18	Chevrolet	Colin Livingston	Pier-Luc Ouellette (R) 1	Tyler Case
18	Chevrolet	Colin Livingston	Alex Tagliani 9	Tyler Case
18	Chevrolet	Colin Livingston	David Michaud (R) 1	Tyler Case
21	Dodge	Rob McConnell	Jason White 2	Rob McConnell
22	Dodge	Scott Steckly	Scott Steckly	Randy Steckly
24	Dodge	Scott Steckly	Spencer Gallagher 1	Mike Knott
25	Ford	Bud Morris	Joey McColm	Ryan Weiss
27	Dodge	Dwight Kennedy	Andrew Ranger	Bill Burns
28	Dodge	D. J. Kennington	Jamie Krzysik (R) 2	Al Lebert
29	Dodge	Ray Courtemanche Jr.	Ray Courtemanche Jr. 4	Serge Labelle
34	Dodge	Jeff Lapcevich	Cayden Lapcevich (R) 2	Rob McConnell
36	Dodge	Dave Jacombs	Alex Labbé 7	Randy Smith
37	Dodge	Clement Samson	Simon Dion-Viens 4	Clement Samson
42	Chevrolet	Peter Klutt	Ryan Klutt 3	Luigi Ciarafoni
47	Dodge	Martin Roy	Louis-Philippe Dumoulin	Mario Gosselin
51	Dodge	Murray Haukaas	Nick Jewell 2	Dave Hall
53	Dodge	Kevin Dowler	Adam Dowler (R) 3	Ron Easton
56	Dodge	Dan Bray	Matthew Scannell	Howie Scannell Jr.
59	Chevrolet 4	Peter Klutt	Gary Klutt (R)	John Fletcher
59	Dodge 7	Peter Klutt	Gary Klutt (R)	John Fletcher
67	Chevrolet	David Thorndyke	David Thorndyke 2	Kattie Smilovsky
69	Chevrolet	Trevor Seibert	Trevor Seibert 2	Al Lebert
71	Dodge	Patrice Brisebois	Patrice Brisebois 2	Yves Boisvert
74	Dodge	Sylvain Lacroix	Kevin Lacroix (R) 6	Jean-Pierre Cyr
76	Dodge 7	Sherri Lapcevich	Jeff Lapcevich 3	Don Thomson Jr.
76	Dodge 7	Sherri Lapcevich	Cayden Lapcevich (R) 4	Don Thomson Jr.
76	Chevrolet 2	Sherri Lapcevich	Jason Hankewich 2	Kevin Hein
77	Dodge	Katherine Almeida	Jocelyn Fecteau 2	Sebastien Berube
87	Ford	Bud Morris	Erica Thiering (R) 6	Ed Wrong
87	Ford	Bud Morris	Kevin Poitras (R) 2	Ed Wrong
87	Ford	Bud Morris	Josh Collins (R) 2	Ed Wrong
89	Ford	Donald Chisholm	Donald Chisholm 1	George Koszkulics
94	Dodge	Ray Courtemanche Jr.	Dave Coursol 4	Andre Coursol
95	Dodge	Peter Simone	Anthony Simone 7	Jeff Walt
98	Dodge	Jim Bray	Larry Jackson 5	Dave Stephens
99	Chevrolet	Derek White	Marc-Antoine Camirand	Robin McCluskey

== Schedule ==
The series' 2015 schedule was released on December 18, 2014. In February 2015, Sunset Speedway was added to the schedule to replace Barrie Speedway, after circuit owners halted racing at the track.

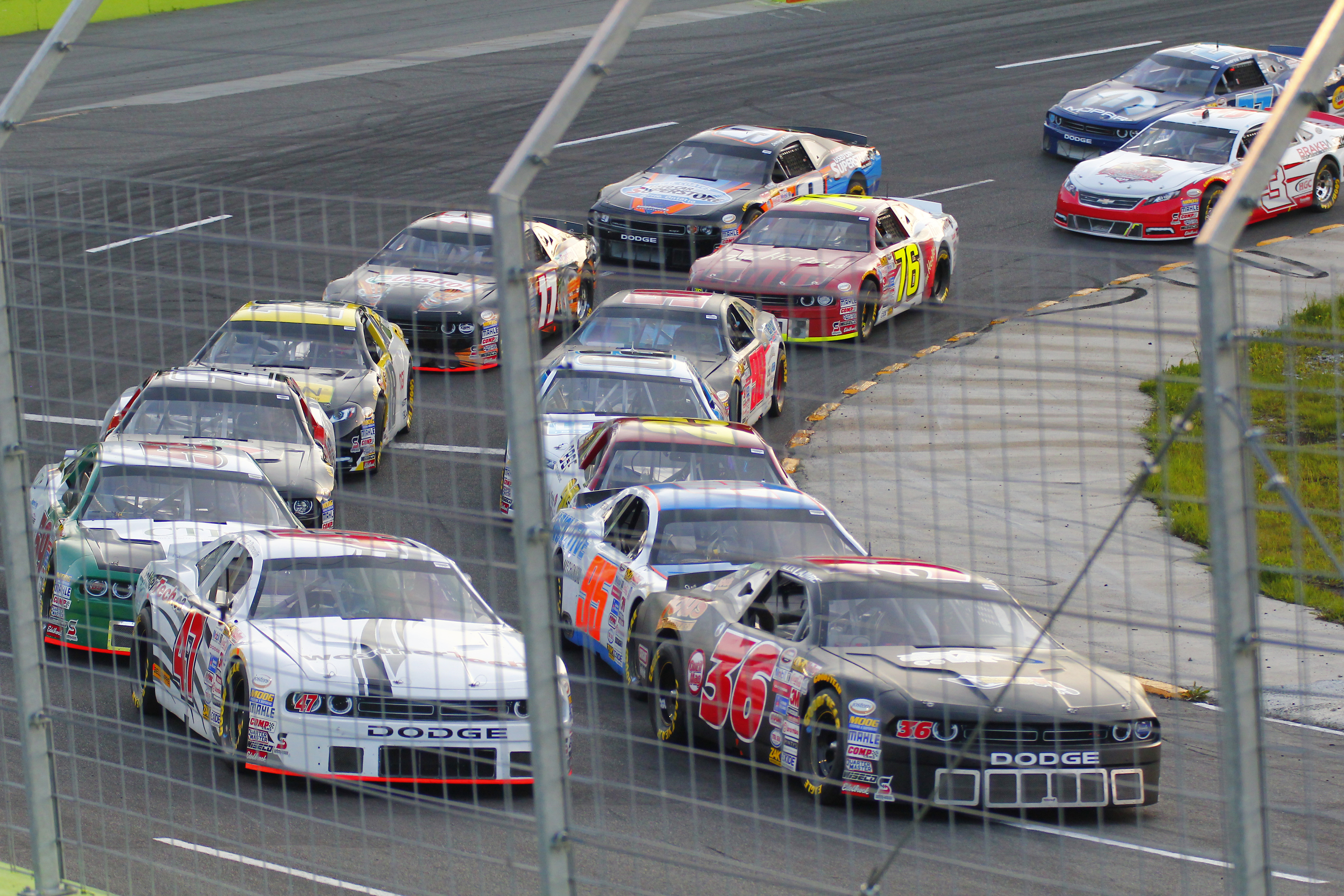
Alex Labbé leads the field just before the start of the Budweiser 300 at Chaudière.

No.	Race title	Track	Date
1	Pinty's presents the Clarington 200	Canadian Tire Motorsport Park, Bowmanville	May 17
2	Budweiser 300	Autodrome Chaudière, Vallée-Jonction	June 13
3	Leland Industries 300 presented by Johnsonville	Sunset Speedway, Innisfil	June 20
4	Ecko Unlimited 100	Circuit ICAR, Mirabel	July 5
5	Alberta Has Energy 300	Edmonton International Raceway, Wetaskiwin	July 11
6	Velocity Prairie Thunder 250	Auto Clearing Motor Speedway, Saskatoon	July 15
7	Lucas Oil National 250 presented by Lacroix Tuning	Autodrome Saint-Eustache, Saint-Eustache	July 25
8	JuliaWine.com le 50 Tours	Circuit Trois-Rivières, Trois-Rivières	August 2
9	Wounded Warriors Canada 300	Riverside International Speedway, James River	August 15
10	Pinty's presents the Clarington 200	Canadian Tire Motorsport Park, Bowmanville	August 30
11	Pinty's 250	Kawartha Speedway, Cavan Monaghan	September 19

== Results and standings ==
=== Races ===
No.	Race	Pole position	Most laps led	Winning driver	Manufacturer
1	Pinty's presents the Clarington 200	Gary Klutt	Scott Steckly	Gary Klutt	Chevrolet
2	Budweiser 300	Alex Labbé	Scott Steckly	Jason Hathaway	Chevrolet
3	Leland Industries 300 presented by Johnsonville	Gary Klutt	Alex Tagliani	Alex Tagliani	Chevrolet
4	Ecko Unlimited 100	Alex Tagliani	Kevin Lacroix	Kevin Lacroix	Dodge
5	Alberta Has Energy 300	Scott Steckly	Scott Steckly	Scott Steckly	Dodge
6	Velocity Prairie Thunder 250	Scott Steckly	Scott Steckly	Scott Steckly	Dodge
7	Lucas Oil National 250 presented by Lacroix Tuning	Scott Steckly	Scott Steckly	Andrew Ranger	Dodge
8	JuliaWine.com le 50 Tours	Andrew Ranger	Kevin Lacroix	Kevin Lacroix	Dodge
9	Wounded Warriors Canada 300	D. J. Kennington	Scott Steckly	Scott Steckly	Dodge
10	Pinty's presents the Clarington 200	Andrew Ranger	Andrew Ranger	Jason Hathaway	Chevrolet
11	Pinty's 250	Scott Steckly	Jason Hathaway	Jason Hathaway	Chevrolet

=== Drivers' championship ===
(key) Bold - Pole position awarded by time. Italics - Pole position set by final practice results or rainout. * – Most laps led.

Pos	Driver	MSP	ACD	SUN	ICAR	EIR	VER	STE	CTR	RIV	MSP	KAW	Points
1	Scott Steckly	5*	16*	4	5	**1***	**1***	**10***	9	1*	7	**2**	446
2	Jason Hathaway	7	1	2	11	3	2	15	8	6	1	1*	442
3	Andrew Ranger	9	4	20	2	6	3	1	**2**	3	**6***	10	428
4	Louis-Philippe Dumoulin	6	10	10	4	2	13	4	5	7	2	4	420
5	Gary Klutt **(R)**	**1**	7	**6**	8	10	14	7	22	8	11	11	383
6	Marc-Antoine Camirand	23	11	8	7	5	5	3	6	2	27	5	382
7	D. J. Kennington	4	3	16	9	4	16	5	7	**16**	4	3	382
8	Jean-François Dumoulin	3	14	5	14	11	8	8	21	5	5	9	381
9	Alex Tagliani		5	1*	**3**	7	7	6	3		8	7	356
10	Joey McColm	18	9	11	12	8	15	17	17	9	13	8	348
11	Matthew Scannell	12	12	14	13	13	17	12	11	13	24	19	326
12	Mark Dilley		17	17		14	4	2		4		13	239
13	Alex Labbé	DNS^{1}	**2**	7	6			11	4		23		229
14	Cayden Lapcevich **(R)**	17	18	3					15		9	6	197
15	Kevin Lacroix **(R)**	26			1*			16	1*		26	21	184
16	Anthony Simone	25	6	19	23			9			29	18	179
17	Erica Thiering **(R)**	16	13	13	20	17	18						167
18	Noel Dowler			9		12	6					15	134
19	James Van Domselaar					9	9				14	14	130
20	Kerry Micks	14			15				16		10		121
21	Jeff Lapcevich	2			10						3		119
22	Simon Dion-Viens	13			17				10		17		119
23	Dave Coursol	15			16				12		15		118
24	Larry Jackson	24	8	15				13					116
25	Dwayne Baker **(R)**		15	12						14		20	115
26	Ray Courtemanche Jr.	20			18				DNS^{1}		18		95
27	Kevin Poitras **(R)**	10							23		12		87
28	Adam Dowler **(R)**					19	10					16	87
29	Ryan Klutt	11							24		25		72
30	Josh Collins **(R)**									10		12	66
31	Jamie Krzysik **(R)**					16	12						60
32	Nick Jewell					20	11						57
33	Jocelyn Fecteau								13		20		55
34	Jason Hankewich					15	19						54
35	David Thorndyke	19									19		50
36	Patrice Brisebois				19				20				49
37	Jason White			18								22	48
38	Trevor Seibert	22			21								45
39	Carlos de Quesada **(R)**								18		28		42
40	Pier-Luc Ouellette **(R)**	8											36
41	D. J. Casey									11			33
42	David Michaud **(R)**									12			32
43	Derek White							14					30
44	Charles Harvey **(R)**								14				30
45	Donald Chisholm									15			29
46	Olivier Bedard **(R)**										16		28
47	Brandon White											17	27
48	Dennis LaForce **(R)**					18							26
49	Paul Jean **(R)**							QL^{2}	19				25
50	Kevin O'Connell **(R)**	21											23
51	Ryley Seibert										21		23
52	Elie Arseneau				22								22
53	Spencer Gallagher										22		22
Pos	Driver	MSP	ACD	SUN	ICAR	EIR	VER	STE	CTR	RIV	MSP	KAW	Points

Notes

- ^{1} – Alex Labbé and Ray Courtemanche Jr. received championship points, despite the fact that they did not start the race.
- ^{2} – Paul Jean qualified in the No. 00 for Derek White.

== See also ==
- 2015 NASCAR Sprint Cup Series
- 2015 NASCAR Xfinity Series
- 2015 NASCAR Camping World Truck Series
- 2015 NASCAR K&N Pro Series East
- 2015 NASCAR K&N Pro Series West
- 2015 NASCAR Whelen Modified Tour
- 2015 NASCAR Whelen Southern Modified Tour
- 2015 NASCAR Mexico Series
- 2015 NASCAR Whelen Euro Series
