= 2022 QwickWick 250 =

Race details
- Race 3 of 13 in the 2022 NASCAR Pinty's Series season
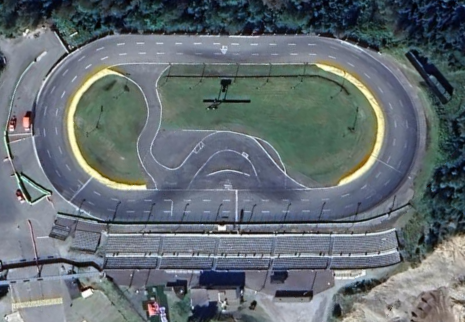
- Date: June 11, 2022
- Location: Autodrome Chaudière in Vallée-Jonction, Quebec
- Course: Permanent racing facility
- Course length: 0.25 miles (0.40 km)
- Distance: 250 laps, 62.500 mi (100.584 km)
- Average speed: 43.411

Pole position
Driver	Louis-Philippe Dumoulin	Marc-André Bergeron
- Time: 13.148

Most laps led
Driver	Marc-Antoine Camirand	Jean-Claude Paille
- Laps: 92

Winner
No. 27	Andrew Ranger	David Wight

Television in the United States
- Network: FloSports

The 2022 Qwick Wick 250 was a NASCAR Pinty's Series race that was held on June 11, 2022. It was contested over 250 laps on the 0.25-mile (0.40 km) oval. It was the 3rd race of the 2022 NASCAR Pinty's Series season. Andrew Ranger collected his first victory of the season, and the 31st of his career.

== Report ==
=== Entry list ===
- (R) denotes rookie driver.
- (i) denotes driver who is ineligible for series driver points.

No.	Driver	Owner	Manufacturer
0	Glenn Styres	David Wight	Chevrolet
1	Jean-Philippe Bergeron	Dave Jacombs	Ford
2	T. J. Rinomato	David Wight	Chevrolet
3	Brett Taylor	Ed Hakonson	Chevrolet
8	Raphaël Lessard	Ed Hakonson	Chevrolet
9	Brandon Watson	David Wight	Chevrolet
12	Mathieu Kingsbury	Mathieu Kingsbury	Dodge
17	D. J. Kennington	D. J. Kennington	Dodge
18	Alex Tagliani	Scott Steckly	Chevrolet
20	Treyten Lapcevich	Scott Steckly	Chevrolet
27	Andrew Ranger	David Wight	Chevrolet
37	Simon Dion-Viens	Clement Samson	Dodge
47	Louis-Philippe Dumoulin	Marc-Andre Bergeron	Dodge
59	Gary Klutt	Peter Klutt	Dodge
64	Mark Dilley	David Wight	Chevrolet
66	Wallace Stacey	Sunshine Stacey	Chevrolet
71	Bryan Cathcart	Bryan Cathcart	Dodge
74	Kevin Lacroix	Sylvain Lacroix	Dodge
80	Donald Theetge	Donald Theetge	Chevrolet
84	Larry Jackson	David Stephens	Dodge
92	Dexter Stacey	Kristin Hamelin	Chevrolet
96	Marc-Antoine Camirand	Jean-Claude Paille	Chevrolet
98	Sam Fellows	Mike Curb	Chevrolet
Official entry list

== Practice ==
Pos	No.	Driver	Owner	Manufacturer	Time	Speed
1	20	Treyten Lapcevich	Scott Steckly	Chevrolet	13.278	67.781
2	80	Donald Theetge	Donald Theetge	Chevrolet	13.301	67.664
3	8	Raphaël Lessard	Ed Hakonson	Chevrolet	13.341	67.461
Official first practice results

== Qualifying ==
=== Qualifying results ===
Pos	No	Driver	Owner	Manufacturer	Time	Speed
1	47	Louis-Philippe Dumoulin	Marc-André Bergeron	Dodge	13.148	68.451
2	80	Donald Theetge	Donald Theetge	Chevrolet	13.154	68.420
3	96	Marc-Antoine Camirand	Jean-Claude Paille	Chevrolet	13.207	68.146
4	18	Alex Tagliani	Scott Steckly	Chevrolet	13.245	67.950
5	8	Raphaël Lessard	Ed Hakonson	Chevrolet	13.246	67.945
6	20	Treyten Lapcevich	Scott Steckly	Chevrolet	13.272	67.812
7	59	Gary Klutt	Peter Klutt	Dodge	13.302	67.659
8	27	Andrew Ranger	David Wight	Chevrolet	13.313	67.603
9	74	Kevin Lacroix	Sylvain Lacroix	Dodge	13.315	67.593
10	17	D. J. Kennington	D. J. Kennington	Dodge	13.332	67.507
11	3	Brett Taylor	Ed Hakonson	Chevrolet	13.349	67.421
12	64	Mark Dilley	David Wight	Chevrolet	13.359	67.370
13	12	Mathieu Kingsbury	Mathieu Kingsbury	Dodge	13.427	67.029
14	9	Brandon Watson	David Wight	Chevrolet	13.427	67.029
15	92	Dexter Stacey	Kristin Hamelin	Chevrolet	13.445	66.939
16	1	Jean-Philippe Bergeron	Dave Jacombs	Ford	13.468	66.825
17	84	Larry Jackson	David Stephens	Dodge	13.470	66.815
18	37	Simon Dion-Viens	Clement Samson	Dodge	13.480	66.766
19	98	Sam Fellows	Mike Curb	Chevrolet	13.555	66.396
20	0	Glenn Styres	David Wight	Chevrolet	13.772	65.350
21	71	Bryan Cathcart	Bryan Cathcart	Dodge	13.783	65.298
22	2	T. J. Rinomato	David Wight	Chevrolet	14.008	64.249
23	66	Wallace Stacey	Sunshine Stacey	Chevrolet	14.096	63.848
Official qualifying results

== Race ==
Laps: 250

Pos	Grid	No	Driver	Owner	Manufacturer	Laps	Points	Status
1	8	27	Andrew Ranger	David Wight	Chevrolet	250	47	running
2	3	96	Marc-Antoine Camirand	Jean-Claude Paille	Chevrolet	250	44	running
3	10	17	D. J. Kennington	D. J. Kennington	Dodge	250	42	running
4	1	47	Louis-Philippe Dumoulin	Marc-André Bergeron	Dodge	250	41	running
5	4	18	Alex Tagliani	Scott Steckly	Chevrolet	250	39	running
6	5	8	Raphaël Lessard	Ed Hakonson	Chevrolet	250	38	running
7	7	59	Gary Klutt	Peter Klutt	Dodge	250	37	running
8	11	3	Brett Taylor	Ed Hakonson	Chevrolet	250	36	running
9	14	9	Brandon Watson	David Wight	Chevrolet	250	35	running
10	18	37	Simon Dion-Viens	Clement Samson	Dodge	250	34	running
11	17	84	Larry Jackson	David Stephens	Dodge	250	33	running
12	12	64	Mark Dilley	David Wight	Chevrolet	249	32	running
13	9	74	Kevin Lacroix	Sylvain Lacroix	Dodge	248	31	running
14	13	12	Mathieu Kingsbury	Mathieu Kingsbury	Dodge	246	30	running
15	19	98	Sam Fellows	Mike Curb	Chevrolet	245	29	running
16	21	71	Bryan Cathcart	Bryan Cathcart	Dodge	244	28	running
17	23	66	Wallace Stacey	Sunshine Stacey	Chevrolet	243	27	running
18	16	1	Jean-Philippe Bergeron	Dave Jacombs	Ford	242	26	crash
19	15	92	Dexter Stacey	Kristin Hamelin	Chevrolet	240	25	running
20	22	2	T. J. Rinomato	David Wight	Chevrolet	238	24	crash
21	2	80	Donald Theetge	Donald Theetge	Chevrolet	234	23	running
22	6	20	Treyten Lapcevich	Scott Steckly	Chevrolet	101	22	engine
23	20	0	Glenn Styres	David Wight	Chevrolet	28	21	ignition
Official race results

=== Race statistics ===
- Lead changes: 4
- Cautions/Laps: 11 for 73 laps
- Time of race: 1:26:23
- Average speed: 43.11 mph

Previous race: 2022 eBay Motors 200	NASCAR Pinty's Series; 2022 season	Next race: 2022 Pro-Line 225
