= 2022 NTN Ultimate Bearing Experience 250 =

Race details
- Race 1 of 13 in the 2022 NASCAR Pinty's Series season
- Date: May 14, 2022
- Location: Sunset Speedway in Innisfil, Ontario
- Course: Permanent racing facility
- Course length: 0.33 miles (0.53 km)
- Distance: 250 laps, 82.50 mi (132.77 km)
- Average speed: 57.951

Pole position
Driver	Brandon Watson	Wight Motorsports
- Time: 14.793

Most laps led
Driver	Marc-Antoine Camirand	Jean-Claude Paille
- Laps: 203

Winner
No. 20	Treyten Lapcevich	Scott Steckly

Television in the United States
- Network: FloSports

The 2022 NTN Ultimate Bearing Experience 250 was a NASCAR Pinty's Series race that was held on May 14, 2022. It was contested over 250 laps on the 0.33-mile (0.53 km) Sunset Speedway oval. It was the 1st race of the 2022 NASCAR Pinty's Series season. Treyten Lapcevich collected his first career Pinty's Series victory, passing Raphaël Lessard on the final overtime restart.

== Report ==
=== Entry list ===
- (R) denotes rookie driver.
- (i) denotes driver who is ineligible for series driver points.

No.	Driver	Owner	Manufacturer
0	Glenn Styres	David Wight	Chevrolet
1	Jean-Philippe Bergeron	Dave Jacombs	Ford
2	T. J. Rinomato	David Wight	Chevrolet
3	Brett Taylor	Ed Hakonson	Chevrolet
8	Raphaël Lessard	Ed Hakonson	Chevrolet
9	Brandon Watson	David Wight	Chevrolet
17	D. J. Kennington	D. J. Kennington	Dodge
18	Alex Tagliani	Scott Steckly	Chevrolet
20	Treyten Lapcevich	Scott Steckly	Chevrolet
27	Andrew Ranger	David Wight	Chevrolet
47	Louis-Philippe Dumoulin	Marc-Andre Bergeron	Dodge
59	Gary Klutt	Peter Klutt	Dodge
64	Mark Dilley	David Wight	Chevrolet
66	Wallace Stacey	Sunshine Stacey	Chevrolet
71	Bryan Cathcart	Bryan Cathcart	Dodge
74	Kevin Lacroix	Sylvain Lacroix	Dodge
80	Donald Theetge	Donald Theetge	Chevrolet
84	Larry Jackson	David Stephens	Dodge
92	Dexter Stacey	Kristin Hamelin	Chevrolet
96	Marc-Antoine Camirand	Jean-Claude Paille	Chevrolet
98	Sam Fellows	Mike Curb	Chevrolet
Official entry list

== Practice ==
Pos	No.	Driver	Owner	Manufacturer	Time	Speed
1	20	Treyten Lapcevich	Scott Steckly	Chevrolet	14.853	80.711
2	9	Brandon Watson	David Wight	Chevrolet	14.855	80.700
3	47	Louis-Philippe Dumoulin	Marc-Andre Bergeron	Dodge	14.942	80.230
Official first practice results

== Qualifying ==
=== Qualifying results ===
Pos	No	Driver	Owner	Manufacturer	Time
1	9	Brandon Watson	David Wight	Chevrolet	14.793
2	20	Treyten Lapcevich	Scott Steckly	Chevrolet	14.810
3	47	Louis-Philippe Dumoulin	Marc-Andre Bergeron	Dodge	14.848
4	8	Raphaël Lessard	Ed Hakonson	Chevrolet	14.865
5	96	Marc-Antoine Camirand	Jean-Claude Paille	Chevrolet	14.934
6	17	D. J. Kennington	D. J. Kennington	Dodge	14.954
7	84	Larry Jackson	David Stephens	Dodge	14.972
8	18	Alex Tagliani	Scott Steckly	Chevrolet	15.002
9	3	Brett Taylor	Ed Hakonson	Chevrolet	15.022
10	59	Gary Klutt	Peter Klutt	Dodge	15.081
11	74	Kevin Lacroix	Sylvain Lacroix	Dodge	15.082
12	64	Mark Dilley	David Wight	Chevrolet	15.224
13	27	Andrew Ranger	David Wight	Chevrolet	15.251
14	1	Jean-Philippe Bergeron	Dave Jacombs	Ford	15.289
15	0	Glenn Styres	David Wight	Chevrolet	15.305
16	2	T. J. Rinomato	David Wight	Chevrolet	15.392
17	92	Dexter Stacey	Kristin Hamelin	Chevrolet	15.464
18	98	Sam Fellows	Mike Curb	Chevrolet	15.480
19	71	Bryan Cathcart	Sunshine Stacey	Chevrolet	15.553
20	66	Wallace Stacey	Sunshine Stacey	Chevrolet	15.966
Official qualifying results

== Race ==
Laps: 252

Pos	Grid	No	Driver	Owner	Manufacturer	Laps	Points	Status
1	2	20	Treyten Lapcevich	Scott Steckly	Chevrolet	252	47	Running
2	4	8	Raphaël Lessard	Ed Hakonson	Chevrolet	252	43	Running
3	1	9	Brandon Watson	David Wight	Chevrolet	252	42	Running
4	5	96	Marc-Antoine Camirand	Jean-Claude Paille	Chevrolet	252	42	Running
5	11	74	Kevin Lacroix	Sylvain Lacroix	Dodge	252	39	Running
6	10	59	Gary Klutt	Peter Klutt	Dodge	251	38	Running
7	8	18	Alex Tagliani	Scott Steckly	Chevrolet	250	37	Running
8	14	1	Jean-Philippe Bergeron	Dave Jacombs	Ford	250	36	Running
9	3	47	Louis-Philippe Dumoulin	Marc-Andre Bergeron	Dodge	250	35	Running
10	12	64	Mark Dilley	David Wight	Chevrolet	248	34	Running
11	6	17	D. J. Kennington	D. J. Kennington	Dodge	248	33	Running
12	13	27	Andrew Ranger	David Wight	Chevrolet	248	32	Running
13	18	98	Sam Fellows	Mike Curb	Chevrolet	247	31	Running
14	19	71	Bryan Cathcart	Bryan Cathcart Racing	Dodge	246	30	Running
15	16	2	T. J. Rinomato	David Wight	Chevrolet	245	29	Running
16	20	66	Wallace Stacey	Sunshine Stacey	Chevrolet	187	28	Running
17	7	84	Larry Jackson	David Stephens	Dodge	162	27	Electrical
18	17	92	Dexter Stacey	Kristin Hamelin	Chevrolet	145	26	Crash
19	15	0	Glenn Styres	David Wight	Chevrolet	144	25	Crash
20	9	3	Brett Taylor	Ed Hakonson	Chevrolet	57	24	Rear end
Official race results

=== Race statistics ===
- Lead changes: 5
- Cautions/Laps: 5 for 36
- Time of race: 1:26:53
- Average speed: 57.951 mph

Previous race: 2021 Pinty's Fall Brawl	NASCAR Pinty's Series; 2022 season	Next race: 2022 eBay Motors 200
