= 2021 NASCAR Pinty's Series =

NASCAR Pinty's Series season

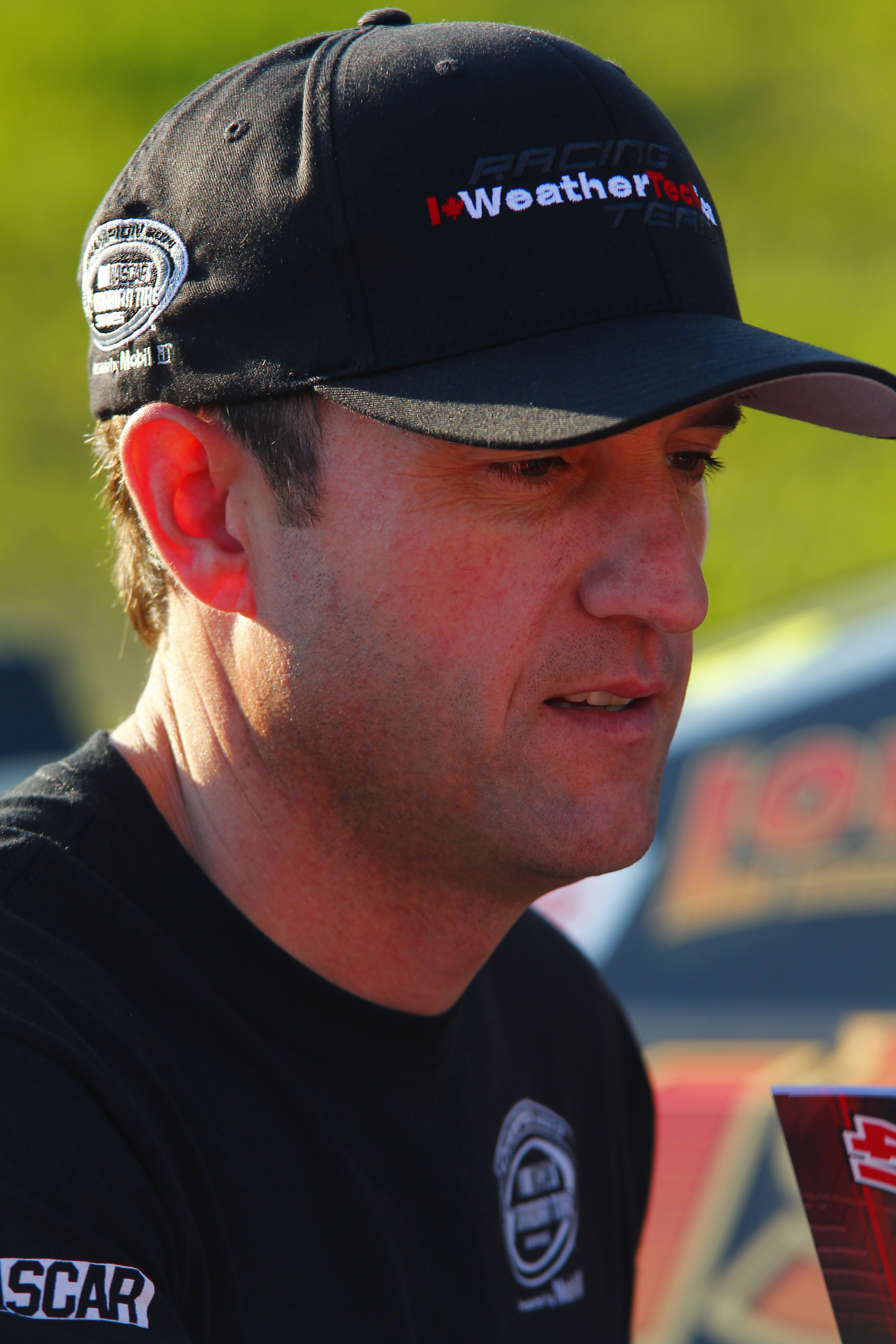
Louis-Philippe Dumoulin, the 2021 Pinty's Series champion. This was his third championship in the series.

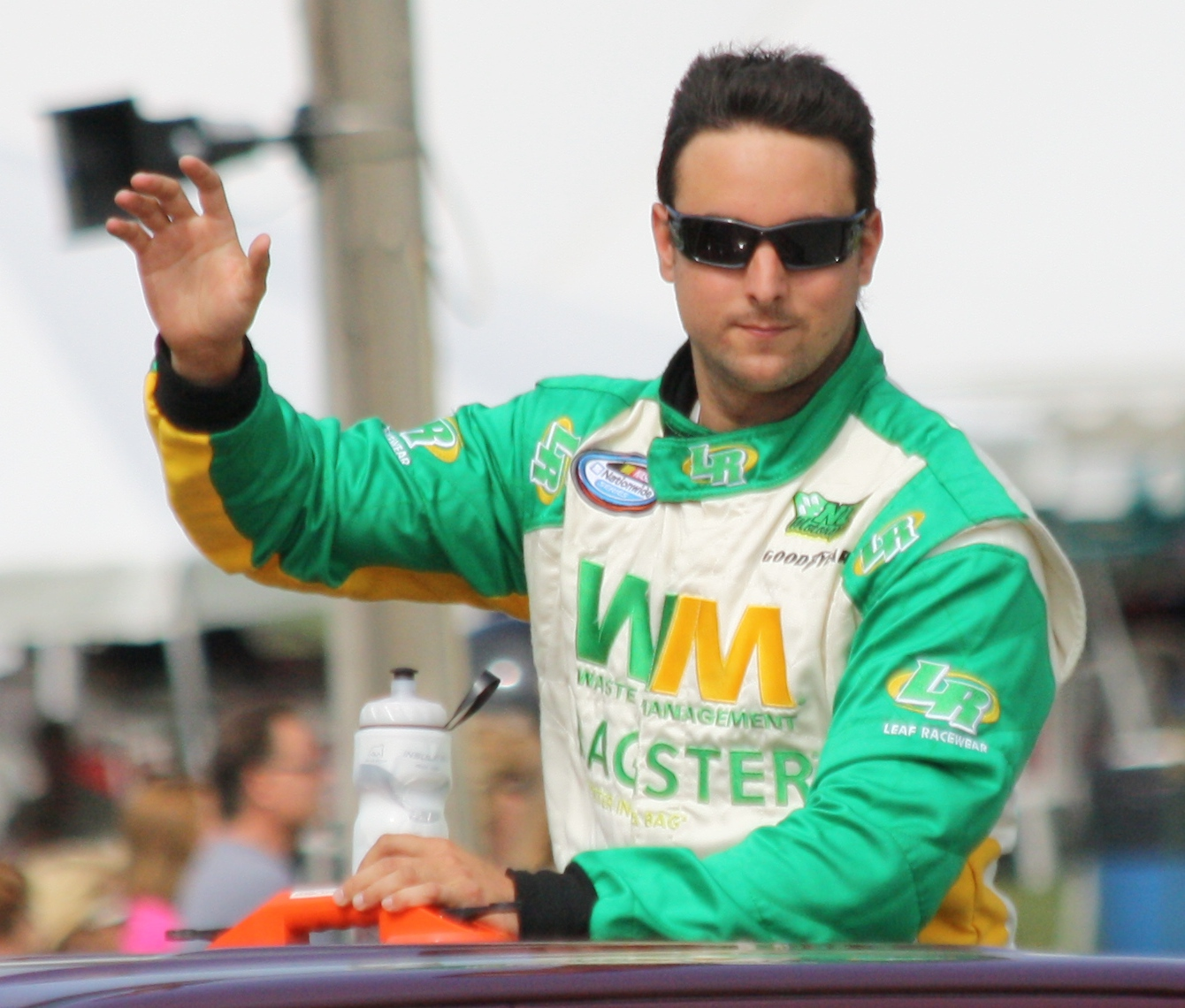
Andrew Ranger, the 2007, 2009 and 2019 series champion, finished second behind Dumoulin in the championship by just 8 points.

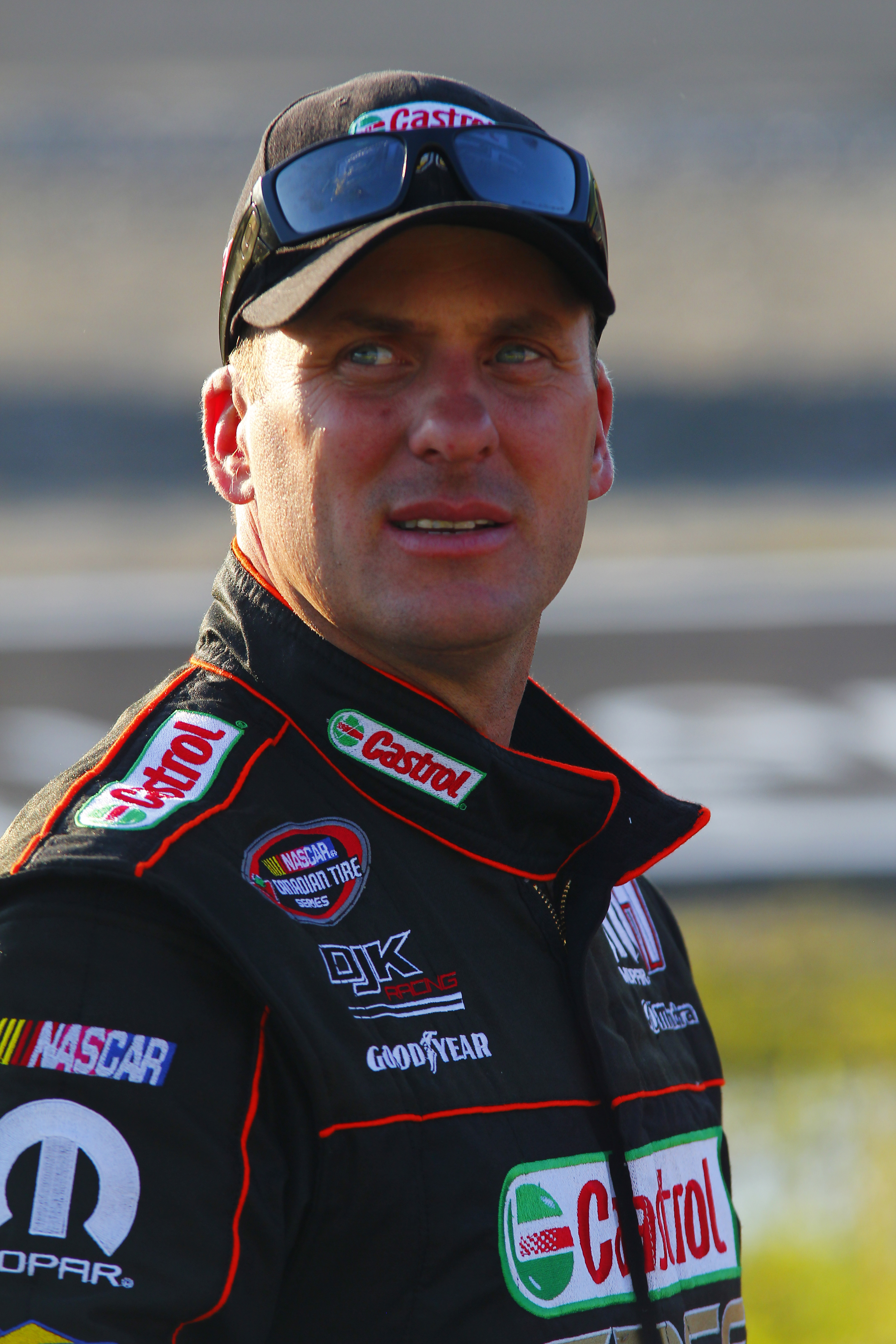
D. J. Kennington, the 2010 and 2012 series champion, finished third in the championship.

The 2021 NASCAR Pinty's Series is the fifteenth season of the Pinty's Series, the national stock car racing series in Canada sanctioned by NASCAR. It began with the Frontline Workers 125 at Sunset Speedway on August 1 and concluded with the Pinty's Fall Brawl at Delaware Speedway on September 26.

Jason Hathaway entered the season as the defending drivers' champion. Louis-Philippe Dumoulin won the championship, his third in the series after previously winning the 2014 and 2018 titles.

== Teams and drivers ==
=== Complete schedule ===
Manufacturer	Car Owner	No.	Driver
Chevrolet	Jim Bray Motorsports with Mike Curb	98	Shantel Kalika 2
Chevrolet	Jim Bray Motorsports with Mike Curb	98	Sam Fellows 8
Chevrolet	Team 3 Red/Ed Hakonson Racing	3	Brett Taylor
Chevrolet	Team 3 Red/Ed Hakonson Racing	8	Shae Gemmell (R) 6
Chevrolet	Team 3 Red/Ed Hakonson Racing	8	Ray Courtemanche Jr. 4
Chevrolet	Team 3 Red/Ed Hakonson Racing	92	Dexter Stacey
Chevrolet	Wight Motorsport Inc.	64	Mark Dilley 6
Chevrolet	Wight Motorsport Inc.	64	Brandon Watson (R) 3
Chevrolet	Wight Motorsport Inc.	64	J. R. Fitzpatrick 1
Chevrolet	Wight Motorsport Inc.	80	Raphaël Lessard 3
Chevrolet	Wight Motorsport Inc.	80	Jean-Frédéric Laberge (R) 3
Chevrolet	Wight Motorsport Inc.	80	Donald Theetge 4
Chevrolet	22 Racing	18	Alex Tagliani
Chevrolet	22 Racing	20	Treyten Lapcevich (R)
Chevrolet	22 Racing	22	Marc-Antoine Camirand
Dodge	DJK Racing	17	D. J. Kennington
Dodge	Dumoulin Compétition	47	Louis-Philippe Dumoulin
Dodge	Lacroix Motorsport	74	Kevin Lacroix
Dodge	Larry Jackson Racing	84	Larry Jackson
Dodge	Rick Ware Racing	51	Andrew Ranger
Dodge	Rick Ware Racing	52	Alex Guenette
Chevrolet 5 Ford 5	Jacombs Racing	7	Peter Shepherd III 6
Chevrolet 5 Ford 5	Jacombs Racing	7	Kyle Marcelli 3
Chevrolet 5 Ford 5	Jacombs Racing	7	Matthew Scannell 1

=== Limited schedule ===
Manufacturer	Car Owner	No.	Driver	Round(s)
Chevrolet	JF77 Racing	77	Jocelyn Fecteau	3
Chevrolet	Jim Bray Motorsports	56	Malcolm Strachan	6
Chevrolet	Luc Lesage Racing	25	Luc Lesage (R)	2
Chevrolet	Promotive Racing	67	David Thorndyke	2
Chevrolet	Wight Motorsports Inc.	2	T. J. Rinomato	9
Chevrolet	Wight Motorsports Inc.	19	Jean-Frederic Laberge (R)	1
Chevrolet	Wight Motorsports Inc.	19	Brandon Watson (R)	1
Chevrolet	Wight Motorsports Inc.	19	Glenn Styres (R)	2
Chevrolet	Legendary Motorcar Company	42	Peter Klutt	1
Chevrolet	Legendary Motorcar Company	42	Ryan Klutt	1
Chevrolet	Legendary Motorcar Company	59	Gary Klutt	2
Dodge	Brent Wheller Motorsports	61	Brent Wheller (R)	7
Dodge	Dumoulin Compétition	04	Jean-François Dumoulin	1
Dodge	Dumoulin Compétition	07	Louis-Philippe Montour	1
Dodge	Larry Jackson Racing	99	Matthew Scannell	2
Ford	Jacombs Racing	36	Cole Powell	3
Ford	SDV Autosport	37	Simon Dion-Viens	1

== Schedule ==
On 4 February 2021, NASCAR announced the 2021 schedule. It included an inaugural race at Ohsweken Speedway, which would have become the first dirt track race in series history, after being cancelled for the 2020 season Due to the ongoing COVID-19 pandemic, the season's start was delayed and multiple races were cancelled.

No.	Race title	Track	Date
1	FrontLine Workers 125	Sunset Speedway, Innisfil	1 August
2	General Tire 125	Sunset Speedway, Innisfil	1 August
3	Guardian Angels 60 Presented by Dermathermes	Circuit de Trois-Rivieres, Trois-Rivieres	15 August
4	LaFernandiere 75	Circuit ICAR, Mirabel	28 August
5	Olymel Grand Prix of Ontario	Canadian Tire Motorsports Park, Bowmanville	4 September
6	Clarington 200	Canadian Tire Motorsports Park, Bowmanville	5 September
7	Motomaster Batteries 125	Flamboro Speedway, Flamborough	12 September
8	Canadian Tire 125	Delaware Speedway, Delaware	24 September
9	QwickWick 125	Delaware Speedway, Delaware	26 September
10	Pinty's Fall Brawl	Delaware Speedway, Delaware	26 September

== Results and standings ==
=== Races ===
No.	Race	Pole position	Most laps led	Winning driver	Manufacturer
1	FrontLine Workers 125	Peter Shepherd III	Peter Shepherd III	Raphaël Lessard	Chevrolet
2	General Tire 125	Andrew Ranger	Raphaël Lessard	Raphaël Lessard	Chevrolet
3	Guardian Angels 60 Presented by Dermathermes	Louis-Philippe Dumoulin	Alex Tagliani	Alex Tagliani	Chevrolet
4	LaFernandiere 75	Andrew Ranger	Kevin Lacroix	Kevin Lacroix	Dodge
5	Olymel Grand Prix of Ontario	Gary Klutt	Gary Klutt	Louis-Philippe Dumoulin	Dodge
6	Clarington 200	Kevin Lacroix	Alex Tagliani	Marc-Antoine Camirand	Chevrolet
7	Motomaster Batteries 125	Treyten Lapcevich	Andrew Ranger	Andrew Ranger	Dodge
8	Canadian Tire 125	Treyten Lapcevich	Treyten Lapcevich	D. J. Kennington	Dodge
9	QwickWick 125	Treyten Lapcevich	Treyten Lapcevich	D. J. Kennington	Dodge
10	Pinty's Fall Brawl	Treyten Lapcevich	Treyten Lapcevich	Andrew Ranger	Dodge

=== Drivers' championship ===
(key) Bold – Pole position awarded by time. Italics – Pole position set by final practice results or Owners' points. * – Most laps led.

Pos.	Driver	SUN	SUN	CTR	ICAR	MSP	MSP	FLA	DEL	DEL	DEL	Points
1	Louis-Philippe Dumoulin	6	3	**5**	3	1	11	7	8	6	6	389
2	Andrew Ranger	2	16	19	**2**	19	5	1*	3	3	1	381
3	D. J. Kennington	17	2	6	6	6	24	2	1	1	5	378
4	Alex Tagliani	3	9	1*	4	4	2*	4	14	18	17	371
5	Treyten Lapcevich **(R)**	9	4	4	17	3	21	**9**	**2***	**5***	15*	361
6	Kevin Lacroix	4	17	3	1*	24	**4**	18	4	19	2	352
7	Alex Guenette	8	6	16	5	11	10	8	7	4	18	347
8	Brett Taylor	15	5	21	10	8	8	3	12	13	8	337
9	Dexter Stacey	18	18	10	7	7	9	17	10	7	7	330
10	Larry Jackson	10	7	11	14	15	20	16	11	8	10	318
11	Marc-Antoine Camirand	7	12	23	18	2	1	15	20	10	21	315
12	T. J. Rinomato	16	15	18	15	23	17		18	12	9	253
13	Sam Fellows			20	12	14	13	14	15	11	12	241
14	Brent Wheller **(R)**	14	14			20	22	12		15	13	198
15	Peter Shepherd III	12	13					5	19	20	3	195
16	Shae Gemmell	5	10					13	6	16	20	195
17	Mark Dilley	11	8	17	11	12	12					193
18	Malcolm Strachan					21	18	11	17	17	16	164
19	Brandon Watson **(R)**							6	16	2	4	150
20	Donald Theetge							10	13	9	11	133
21	Raphaël Lessard	1	1*	14								125
22	Ray Courtemanche Jr.			12	13	17	15					119
23	Matthew Scannell				8	9	7					108
24	Jean-Frédéric Laberge **(R)**			22	16	13	23					102
25	Kyle Marcelli			15		22	3					92
26	Cole Powell								5	21	19	87
27	Jocelyn Fecteau			13		16	19					84
28	Gary Klutt					**5***	6					80
29	Luc Lesage **(R)**			9	9							70
30	Shantel Kalika	13	11									64
31	Glenn Styres									14	14	60
32	David Thorndyke					18	16					54
33	Jean-François Dumoulin			2								42
34	Simon-Dion Viens			7								38
35	Louis-Philippe Mountour **(R)**			8								36
36	J. R. Fitzpatrick								9			35
37	Peter Klutt					10						34
38	Ryan Klutt						14					30
Pos.	Driver	SUN	SUN	CTR	ICAR	MSP	MSP	FLA	DEL	DEL	DEL	Points

== See also ==
- 2021 NASCAR Cup Series
- 2021 NASCAR Xfinity Series
- 2021 NASCAR Camping World Truck Series
- 2021 ARCA Menards Series
- 2021 ARCA Menards Series East
- 2021 ARCA Menards Series West
- 2021 NASCAR Whelen Modified Tour
- 2021 NASCAR Whelen Euro Series
- 2021 eNASCAR iRacing Pro Invitational Series
- 2021 SRX Series
- 2021 Southern Modified Auto Racing Teams season
