= NASCAR Canada Series at Canadian Tire Motorsport Park =

NASCAR Canada Series races in Bowmanville, Ontario

Coordinates: 44°03′00″N 78°40′40″W

NASCAR Canada Series at Mosport

NASCAR Canada Series
- Venue: Canadian Tire Motorsport Park
- Location: Bowmanville, Ontario, Canada

Circuit information
- Surface: Asphalt
- Length: 2.459 mi (3.957 km)
- Turns: 10

Stock car racing events in the NASCAR Canada Series have been held at Canadian Tire Motorsport Park in Bowmanville, Ontario, Canada during numerous seasons and times of year since the series inception in 2007.

== May race ==
CarGurus 200

NASCAR Canada Series
- Venue: Canadian Tire Motorsport Park
- Corporate sponsor: CarGurus
- First NCS race: 2007
- Distance: 125 mi (201 km)
- Laps: 51
- Previous names: Dickies 200, Vortex Brake Pads 200, Clarington 200, Olymel Grand Prix of Ontario, eBay Motors 200, ASSA ABLOY Accentra 200

The CarGurus 200 is the current name of the May race, Gary Klutt is the defending winner, having won it in 2026.

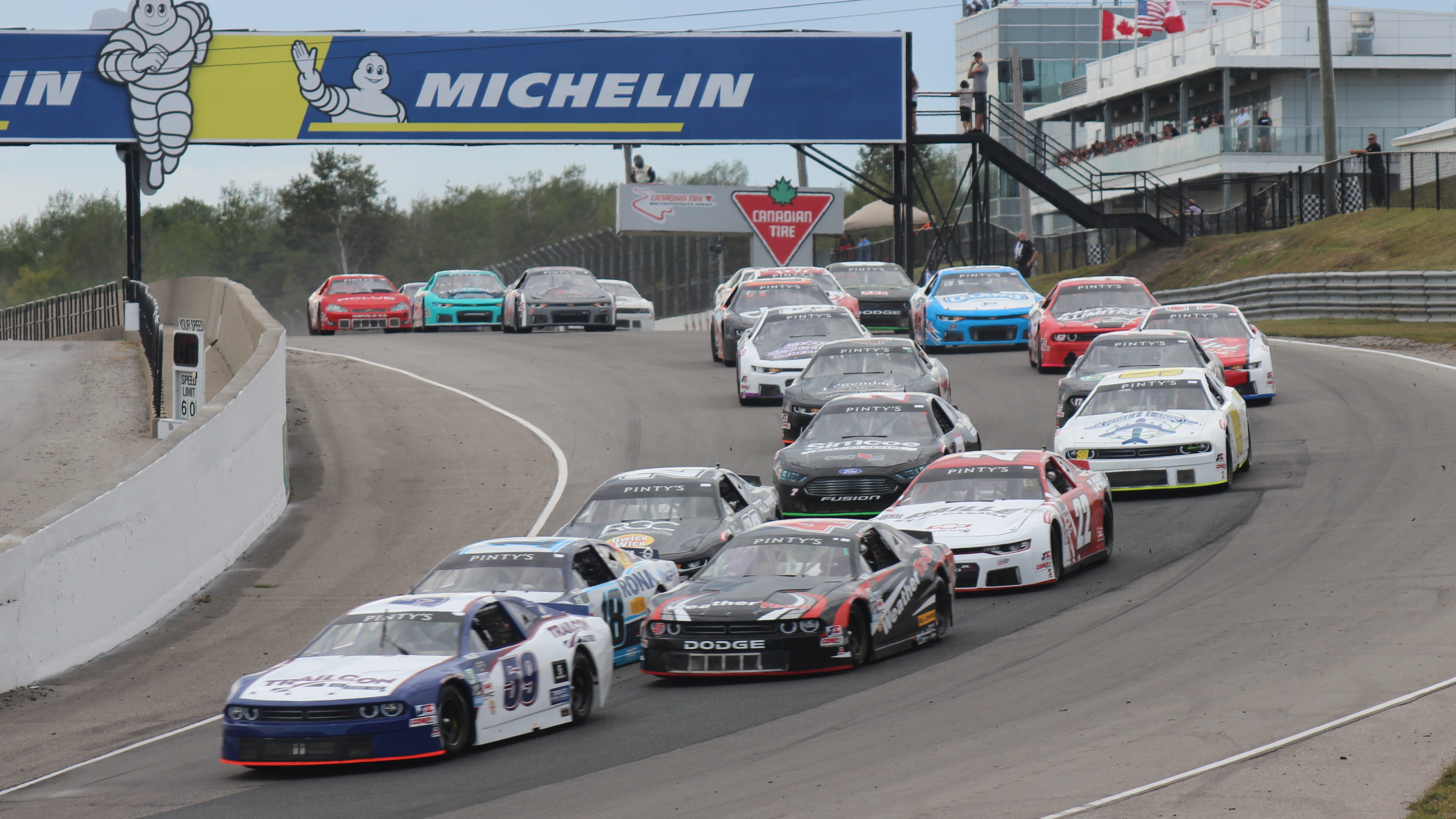
2021 race restart

=== Past winners ===
Year	Date	Driver	Team	Car	Distance	Report	Ref
NASCAR Canada Series
2007	June 17	(Canada) Andrew Ranger	Wal-Mart / Tide	Ford	51 Laps	Report	
2008	June 15	(Canada) J. R. Fitzpatrick	Fitzpatrick Motorsports	Chevrolet	53 Laps	Report	
2009	June 14	(Canada) Andrew Ranger	Wal-Mart / Tide	Ford	51 Laps	Report	
2010	June 13	(Canada) J. R. Fitzpatrick	Schick Hydro	Chevrolet	51 Laps	Report	
2011	June 26	(Canada) D. J. Kennington	Castrol Edge	Dodge	51 Laps	Report	
2012	May 20	(Canada) J. R. Fitzpatrick	Equipment Express	Chevrolet	51 Laps	Report	
2013	May 19	(Canada) L. P. Dumoulin	WeatherTech Canada / Bellemare	Dodge	51 Laps	Report	
2014	May 18	(Canada) J. R. Fitzpatrick	Equipment Express	Chevrolet	54 Laps	Report	
2015	May 17	(Canada) Gary Klutt	CTL Corp / Legendary Motorcar	Chevrolet	51 Laps	Report	
2016	May 22	(Canada) Andrew Ranger	Mopar / Pennzoil	Dodge	51 Laps	Report	
2017	May 21	(Canada) Kevin Lacroix	Bumper to Bumper/Total/Gates/Go Fast	Dodge	55 Laps	Report	
2018	May 20	(Canada) L. P. Dumoulin	WeatherTech Canada/Bellemare	Dodge	51 Laps	Report	
2019	May 19	(Canada) Kevin Lacroix	Lacroix Motorsports	Dodge	51 Laps	Report	
2020	Not held						
2021	September 4	(Canada) L. P. Dumoulin	Dumoulin Compétition	Dodge	30 Laps	Report	
2022	May 22	(Canada) Kevin Lacroix	Lacroix Motorsports	Dodge	57 Laps	Report	
2023	May 21	(Canada) Treyten Lapcevich	22 Racing	Chevrolet	51 Laps	Report	
2024	May 19	(Canada) Marc-Antoine Camirand	Paillé Racing	Chevrolet	53 Laps	Report	
2025	May 18	(Canada) Marc-Antoine Camirand	Paillé Racing	Chevrolet	51 Laps	Report	
2026	May 17	(Canada) Gary Klutt	Legendary Motorcar Company	Dodge	58 Laps	Report	

== September race ==
WeatherTech 200

NASCAR Canada Series
- Venue: Canadian Tire Motorsport Park
- Corporate sponsor: WeatherTech
- First NCS race: 2013
- Distance: 125 mi (201 km)
- Laps: 51
- Previous names: Pinty's presents the Clarington 200, Can-Am 200, Total Quartz 200, Clarington 200

The WeatherTech 200 is the current name of the September race, Andrew Ranger is the defending winner, having won it in 2026.

=== Past winners ===
Year	Date	Driver	Team	Car	Distance	Report	Ref
NASCAR Canada Series
2013	September 1	(Canada) L. P. Dumoulin	WeatherTech Canada / Bellemare	Dodge	42 Laps	Report	
2014	August 31	(Canada) J. R. Fitzpatrick	Equipment Express	Chevrolet	51 Laps	Report	
2015	August 30	(Canada) Jason Hathaway	Muskoka Aircraft Center / HGC	Chevrolet	51 Laps	Report	
2016	September 4	(Canada) Kevin Lacroix	Bumper/Total/Go Fast	Dodge	51 Laps	Report	
2017	September 3	(Canada) Kevin Lacroix	Bumper to Bumper/Total/Gates/Go Fast	Dodge	51 Laps	Report	
2018	August 26	(Canada) Alex Tagliani	22 Racing	Chevrolet	51 Laps	Report	
2019	August 25	(Canada) Kevin Lacroix	Lacroix Motorsports	Dodge	53 Laps	Report	
2020	Not held						
2021	September 5	(Canada) Marc-Antoine Camirand	Paillé Racing	Chevrolet	51 Laps	Report	
2022	September 4	(Canada) Marc-Antoine Camirand	Paillé Racing	Chevrolet	51 Laps	Report	
2023	September 3	(Canada) Kevin Lacroix	Lacroix Motorsports	Dodge	51 Laps	Report	
2024	September 1	(Canada) Kevin Lacroix	Innovation Auto Sport	Dodge	51 Laps	Report	
2025	August 31	(Canada) Marc-Antoine Camirand	Paillé Racing	Chevrolet	51 Laps	Report	
2026	September 6	(Canada) Andrew Ranger	Innovation Auto Sport	Chevrolet	52 Laps	Report	

== Former oval race ==
Clarington 200
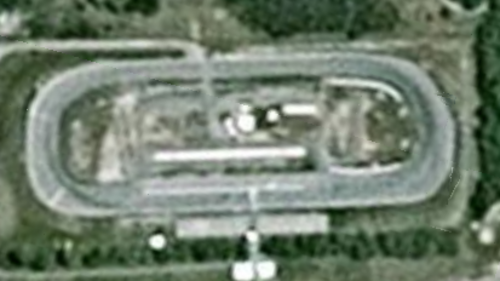

NASCAR Canada Series
- Venue: Mosport Speedway
- First NCS race: 2007
- Distance: 100 mi (160 km)
- Laps: 200
- Previous names: Full Throttle Energy Drink 200, Vortex Brake Pads 200, Dickies 200, Clarington 200

The Clarington 200 was a NASCAR Canada Series stock car race held annually at Mosport Speedway in Bowmanville, Ontario, Canada.

=== Past winners ===
Year	Date	Driver	Team	Car	Distance	Report	Ref
NASCAR Canada Series
2007	Aug 11	(Canada) Don Thomson Jr.	Home Hardware	Chevrolet	209 Laps	Report	
2008	Aug 9	(Canada) Kerry Micks	Beyond Digital Imaging	Ford	200 Laps	Report	
2009	Aug 8	(Canada) Andrew Ranger	Wal-Mart / Tide / Charmin	Ford	200 Laps	Report	
2010	Aug 21	(Canada) Don Thomson Jr.	Home Hardware	Chevrolet	200 Laps	Report	
2011	May 28	(Canada) Scott Steckly	Canadian Tire / MotoMaster	Dodge	201 Laps	Report	
2012	June 16	(Canada) D. J. Kennington	Castrol Edge / Mahindra Tractors	Dodge	200 Laps	Report	
2013	June 22	(Canada) Pete Shepherd III	National Exhaust / Diamond Material Handling	Dodge	200 Laps	Report	

== See also ==
- NASCAR Truck Series at Canadian Tire Motorsport Park

== Footnotes ==
Previous race: NTN BCA 200 (last season)	NASCAR Canada Series; CarGurus 200	Next race: Bud Light 125/Michelob Ultra 125

Previous race: NAPA 100	NASCAR Canada Series; WeatherTech 200	Next race: NTN BCA 200
