= 2022 Pro-Line 225 =

Race details
- Race 4 of 13 in the 2022 NASCAR Pinty's Series season
- Date: June 25, 2022
- Location: Eastbound International Speedway in Avondale, Newfoundland and Labrador
- Course: Permanent racing facility
- Course length: 3/8 miles (0.604 km)
- Distance: 225 laps, 84.375 mi (135.7884 km)
- Average speed: 54.602

Pole position
Driver	Brandon Watson	David Wight
- Time: 15.774

Most laps led
Driver	Marc-Antoine Camirand	Jean-Claude Paille
- Laps: 138

Winner
No. 96	Marc-Antoine Camirand	Jean-Claude Paille

Television in the United States
- Network: FloSports

The 2022 Pro-Line 225 was a NASCAR Pinty's Series race that was held on June 26, 2022. Originally scheduled to be held on June 25, it was pushed back due to rain. It was contested over 225 laps on the 3/8-mile (0.60 km) oval. It was the 4th race of the 2022 NASCAR Pinty's Series season, as well as the inaugural race at the Eastbound International Speedway. Marc-Antoine Camirand collected his first victory of the season, and the third of his career.

== Report ==
=== Entry list ===
- (R) denotes rookie driver.
- (i) denotes driver who is ineligible for series driver points.

No.	Driver	Owner	Manufacturer
0	Glenn Styres	David Wight	Chevrolet
1	J. P. Bergeron	Dave Jacombs	Ford
2	T. J. Rinomato	David Wight	Chevrolet
3	Brett Taylor	Ed Hakonson	Chevrolet
8	Raphaël Lessard	Ed Hakonson	Chevrolet
9	Brandon Watson	David Wight	Chevrolet
17	D. J. Kennington	D. J. Kennington	Dodge
18	Alex Tagliani	Scott Steckly	Chevrolet
20	Treyten Lapcevich	Scott Steckly	Chevrolet
27	Andrew Ranger	David Wight	Chevrolet
28	Sara Thorne	D. J. Kennington	Dodge
47	Louis-Philippe Dumoulin	Marc-Andre Bergeron	Dodge
56	Brandon McFarlane	Jim Bray	Chevrolet
59	Gary Klutt	Peter Klutt	Dodge
64	Mark Dilley	David Wight	Chevrolet
66	Wallace Stacey	Sunshine Stacey	Chevrolet
71	Bryan Cathcart	Bryan Cathcart	Dodge
74	Kevin Lacroix	Sylvain Lacroix	Dodge
80	Donald Theetge	Donald Theetge	Chevrolet
84	Larry Jackson	David Stephens	Dodge
92	Dexter Stacey	Kristin Hamelin	Chevrolet
96	Marc-Antoine Camirand	Jean-Claude Paille	Chevrolet
Official entry list

== Practice/Qualifying ==
=== Practice/Qualifying results ===
Pos	No	Driver	Owner	Manufacturer	Time	Speed
1	9	Brandon Watson	David Wight	Chevrolet	15.774	85.584
2	20	Treyten Lapcevich	Scott Steckly	Chevrolet	15.799	85.448
3	27	Andrew Ranger	David Wight	Chevrolet	15.902	84.895
4	47	L. P. Dumoulin	Marc-André Bergeron	Dodge	15.942	84.682
5	96	Marc-Antoine Camirand	Jean-Claude Paille	Chevrolet	15.943	84.677
6	74	Kevin Lacroix	Sylvain Lacroix	Dodge	15.953	84.624
7	59	Gary Klutt	Peter Klutt	Dodge	15.977	84.496
8	80	Donald Theetge	Donald Theetge	Chevrolet	15.985	84.454
9	8	Raphaël Lessard	Ed Hakonson	Chevrolet	15.993	84.412
10	17	D. J. Kennington	D. J. Kennington	Dodge	16.025	84.243
11	64	Mark Dilley	David Wight	Chevrolet	16.026	84.238
12	3	Brett Taylor	Ed Hakonson	Chevrolet	16.049	84.117
13	18	Alex Tagliani	Scott Steckly	Chevrolet	16.052	84.102
14	92	Dexter Stacey	Kristin Hamelin	Chevrolet	16.075	83.981
15	1	J. P. Bergeron	Dave Jacombs	Ford	16.111	83.794
16	84	Larry Jackson	David Stephens	Dodge	16.148	83.602
17	56	Brandon McFarlane	Jim Bray	Chevrolet	16.236	83.149
18	66	Wallace Stacey	Sunshine Stacey	Chevrolet	16.420	82.217
19	71	Bryan Cathcart	Bryan Cathcart	Dodge	16.466	81.987
20	2	T. J. Rinomato	David Wight	Chevrolet	16.568	81.482
21	28	Sara Thorne	D. J. Kennington	Dodge	17.066	79.105
22	0	Glenn Styres	David Wight	Chevrolet	17.111	78.897
Official qualifying results

== Race ==
Laps: 225

Pos	Grid	No	Driver	Owner	Manufacturer	Laps	Points	Status
1	5	96	Marc-Antoine Camirand	Jean-Claude Paille	Chevrolet	225	48	running
2	2	20	Treyten Lapcevich	Scott Steckly	Chevrolet	225	43	running
3	10	17	D. J. Kennington	D. J. Kennington	Dodge	225	41	running
4	1	9	Brandon Watson	David Wight	Chevrolet	225	41	running
5	7	59	Gary Klutt	Peter Klutt	Dodge	225	39	running
6	12	92	Dexter Stacey	Kristin Hamelin	Chevrolet	225	38	running
7	6	74	Kevin Lacroix	Sylvain Lacroix	Dodge	225	37	running
8	9	8	Raphaël Lessard	Ed Hakonson	Chevrolet	225	36	running
9	15	1	J. P. Bergeron	Dave Jacombs	Ford	225	35	running
10	11	64	Mark Dilley	David Wight	Chevrolet	225	34	running
11	14	84	Larry Jackson	David Stephens	Dodge	225	33	running
12	19	71	Bryan Cathcart	Bryan Cathcart	Dodge	225	32	running
13	18	2	T. J. Rinomato	David Wight	Chevrolet	225	31	running
14	16	66	Wallace Stacey	Sunshine Stacey	Chevrolet	224	30	running
15	13	18	Alex Tagliani	Scott Steckly	Chevrolet	219	29	running
16	17	56	Brandon McFarlane	Jim Bray	Chevrolet	219	28	running
17	21	28	Sara Thorne	D. J. Kennington	Dodge	218	27	running
18	22	0	Glenn Styres	David Wight	Chevrolet	129	26	crash
19	4	47	L. P. Dumoulin	Marc-André Bergeron	Dodge	119	25	crash
20	3	27	Andrew Ranger	David Wight	Chevrolet	42	25	overheating
21	8	80	Donald Theetge	Donald Theetge	Chevrolet	27	23	crash
22	20	3	Brett Taylor	Ed Hakonson	Chevrolet	0	22	crash
Official race results

=== Race statistics ===
- Lead changes: 7
- Cautions/Laps: 11 for 51 laps
- Time of race: 1:32.43
- Average speed: 54.602

Previous race: 2022 QwickWick 250	NASCAR Pinty's Series; 2022 season	Next race: 2022 Grand Prix of Toronto
