= Sunset Speedway (Ontario) =

Racetrack

- Oval (1968–present)
- Location: 6918 Yonge Street; Innisfil, Ontario; Canada
- Coordinates: 44°16′49″N 79°36′39″W
- Capacity: 9,000
- Owner: Brian Todish May 2009–2025
- Operator: Brian Todish May 2009–2025
- Opened: 1968
- Major events: Current: APC United Late Model Series (2015–2019, 2021–present); Former: NASCAR Canada Series (2015–2016, 2020–2023)
- Website: http://sunsetspeedway.ca/

Semi-Banked Oval (1968–present)
- Surface: Asphalt
- Length: 0.333 mi (0.536 km)

Sunset Speedway was a NASCAR sanctioned 0.333 mi (0.536 km) semi-banked short track motor racing oval, located forty minutes north of Toronto, in the town of Innisfil, Ontario, Canada. Sunset’s weekly Saturday night racing program runs from May to September each year, featuring Junior Late Models, Bone Stocks, Mini Stocks, Super Stocks and Late Models. The track regularly features touring series including the NASCAR Canada Series, APC United Late Model Series, OSCAAR Modifieds, Hot Rods and Outlaw Super Late Models.

== History ==
In operation since 1968, new ownership purchased the speedway in May 2009 and upgraded the facility. The track asphalt was replaced, grandstands were repaired and a pit road was added for traveling series. Following the closure of nearby Barrie Speedway in 2015, NASCAR moved its weekly NASCAR Advance Auto Parts Weekly Series to the track and it hosted the NASCAR Pinty's Series for the first time that season.

== NASCAR Canada Series ==
The NASCAR Pinty's Series made its first trip to Sunset Speedway for the first running of the Leland Industries 300 presented by Johnsonville on July 20, 2015. Alex Tagliani won the inaugural event and repeated the victory in 2016. After a three year absence, NASCAR announced the Pinty's Series would return to the track in 2020.

Season	Date	Race title	Driver	Manufacturer
2015	June 20	Leland Industries 300 presented by Johnsonville	(Canada) Alex Tagliani	Chevrolet
2016	June 18	Leland Industries 300 presented by Dickies	(Canada) Alex Tagliani	Chevrolet
2020	August 15	QwickWick 125	(Canada) L.P. Dumoulin	Dodge
2020	August 15	Canadian Tire 125	(Canada) Jason Hathaway	Chevrolet
2021	August 1	FrontLine Workers 125	(Canada) Raphaël Lessard	Chevrolet
2021	August 1	General Tire 125	(Canada) Raphaël Lessard	Chevrolet
2022	May 14	NTN Ultimate Bearing Experience 250	(Canada) Treyten Lapcevich	Chevrolet
2023	May 13	NTN Ultimate Bearing Experience 250	(Canada) Treyten Lapcevich	Chevrolet

== Photo gallery ==
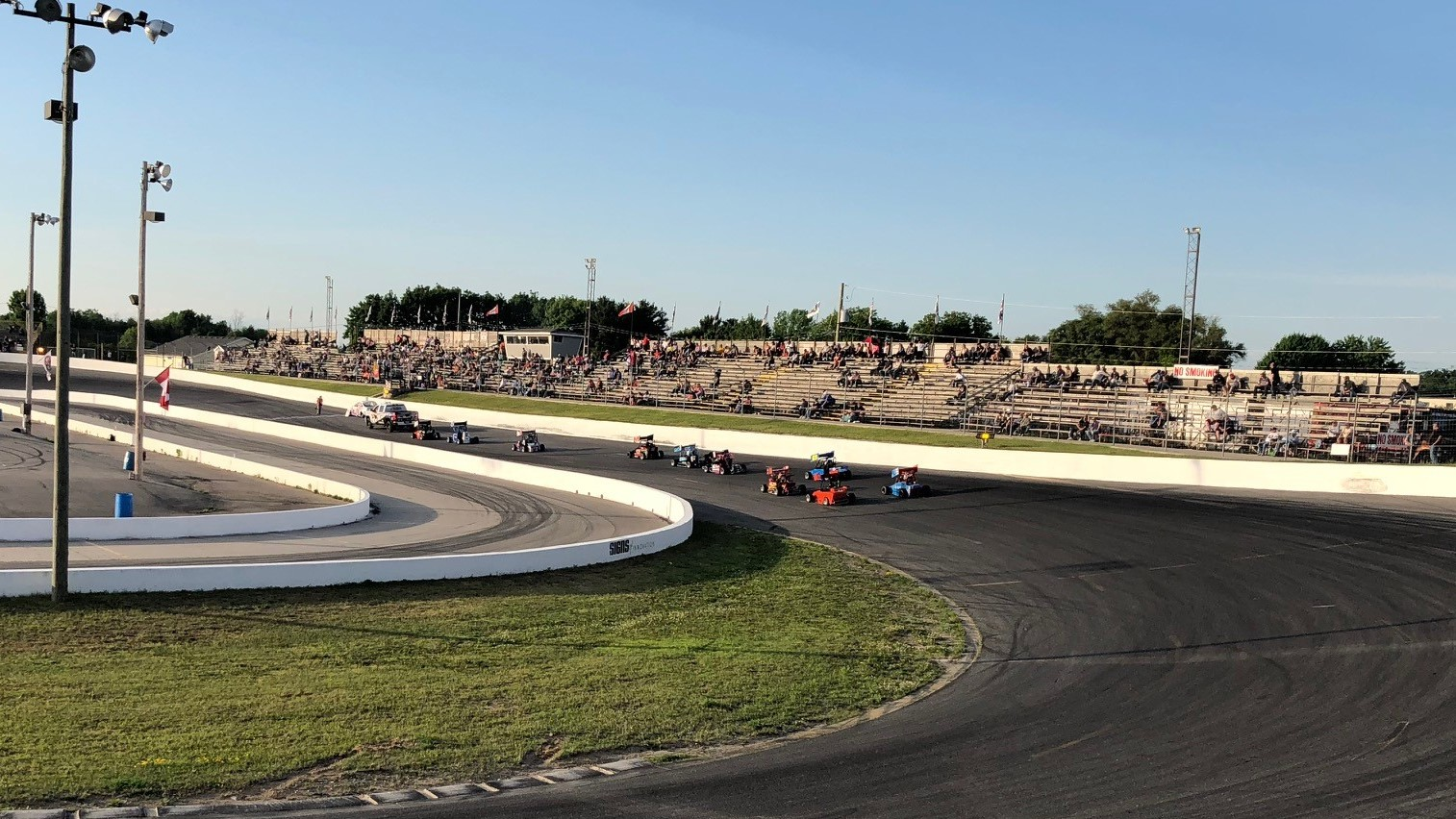
Front straightaway

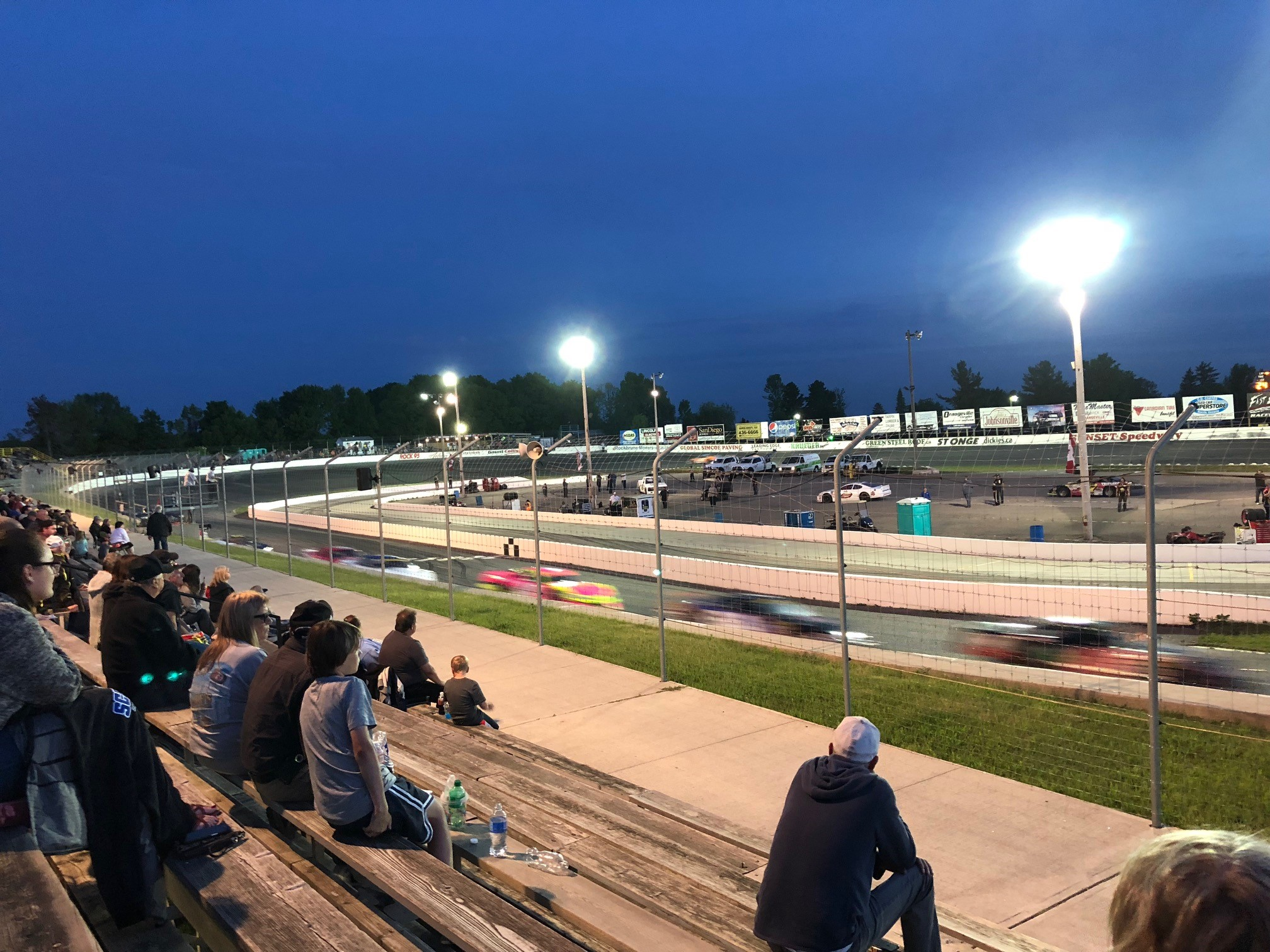
Front straight and grandstands.

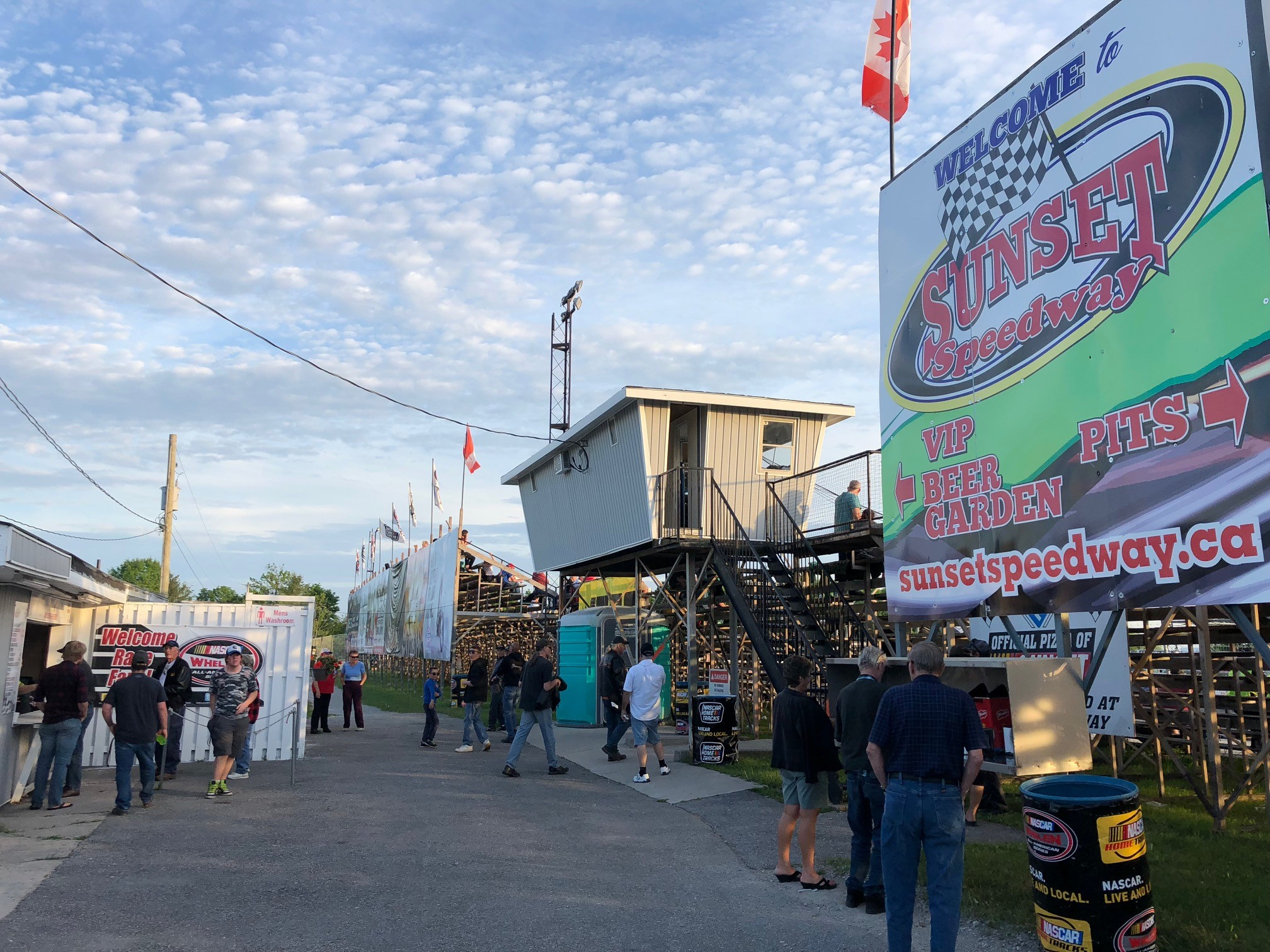
Concession area.

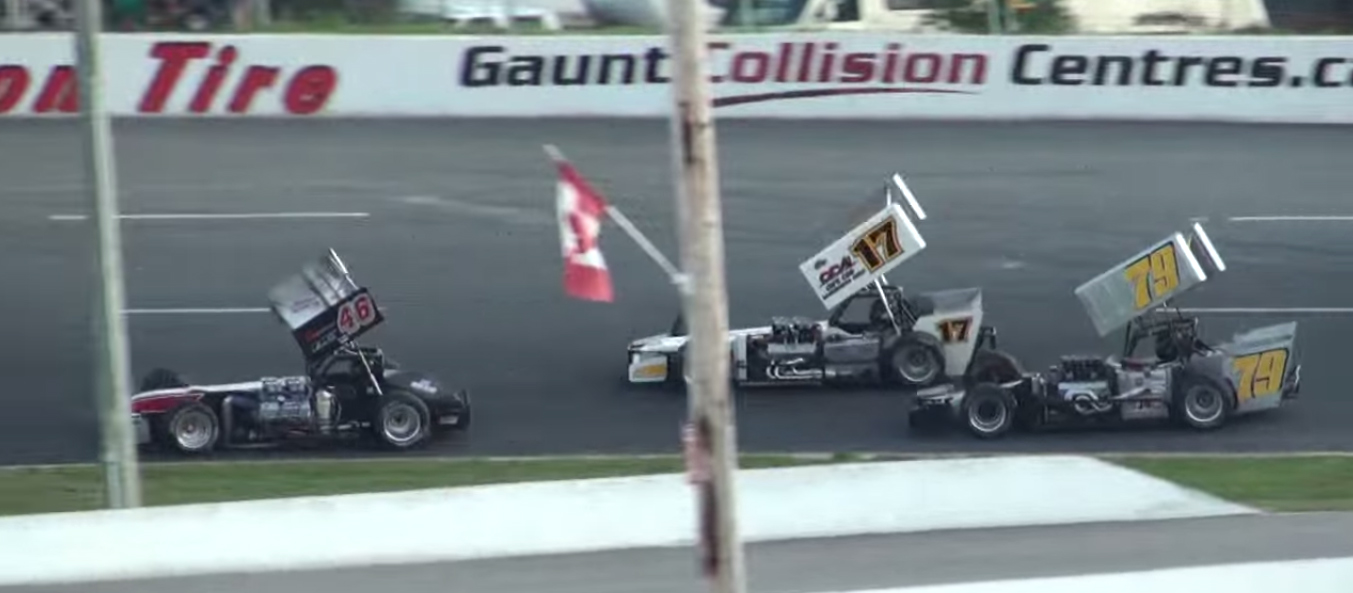
ISMA Supermodified race in 2013.

== See also ==
- List of auto racing tracks in Canada
- Barrie Speedway
