= Rob Naismith =

Canadian racing driver (born 1971)

- Born: October 1, 1971 (age 55); Saskatoon, Saskatchewan, Canada

NASCAR Canada Series career
- 10 races run over 2 years
- Car no., team: No. 10 (MRN Racing Inc.)
- 2026 position: 14th
- Best finish: 14th (2025)
- First race: 2025 Leland Industries 250 (Saskatoon)
- Last race: 2026 NTN BCA 200 (Delaware)
Wins	Top tens	Poles
0	1	0
- Statistics up to date as of September 13, 2026.

Rob Naismith (born October 1, 1971) is a Canadian professional stock car racing driver. He competes part-time in the NASCAR Canada Series, driving the No. 10 Chevrolet for his own team, MRN Racing Inc.

== Racing career ==
Naismith was originally scheduled to make his NASCAR Canada Series debut in the 2025 NAPA 300 at Edmonton International Raceway. He would ultimately withdraw from the event. He made his series debut in the 2025 Leland Industries 250 at Sutherland Automotive Speedway in his hometown of Saskatoon, Saskatchewan, one of two drivers from Saskatchewan in the field. Naismith would finish last in the 11-car field and would not compete in the series again in 2025. In 2026, Naismith expanded his schedule to include all oval races. His first start of the season came at Autodrome Chaudière, where he finished 12th in the first race of the doubleheader. In the second race of the doubleheader, the Michelob Ultra 125, Naismith secured his first career top-ten finish in tenth. In the following race at Riverside International Speedway, Naismith finished 12th after suspension issues caused him to retire from the event after 172 laps. In the XPN Burn-X 125, the first race of the Autodrome Montmagny doubleheader, Naismith finished in 12th. He would end up finishing in last place in 22nd in the second race, the Delta Electrolyte 150, after retiring from the race due to mechanical issues after six laps. In both the Dorman Products 150 and Carlyle Tools 150 at Edmonton International Raceway, Naismith finished in 11th.

== Motorsports career results ==
=== NASCAR ===
(key) (Bold – Pole position awarded by qualifying time. Italics – Pole position earned by points standings or practice time. * – Most laps led.)

==== Canada Series ====
NASCAR Canada Series results
Year	Team	No.	Make	1	2	3	4	5	6	7	8	9	10	11	12	13	14	NCSC	Pts	Ref
2025	MRN Racing Inc.	10	Chevy	MSP	RIS	EDM	SAS; 11	CMP	ACD	CTR	ICAR	MSP	DEL	DEL	AMS			46th	33	
2026	MRN Racing Inc.	10	Chevy	MSP	ACD; 12	ACD; 10	RIS; 12	AMS; 16	AMS; 22	CMP	EIR; 11	EIR; 11	CTR	MAR	ICAR; 19	MSP	DEL; 15	14th	268	

^{*} Season still in progress
^{1} Ineligible for series points
