= Connor Bell (racing driver) =

Canadian racing driver (born 2005)

- Born: July 30, 2005 (age 21); Ottawa, Ontario, Canada
- Awards: 2026 NASCAR Canada Series Rookie of the Year

NASCAR Canada Series career
- 16 races run over 2 years
- Car no., team: No. 3/8 (Ed Hakonson Racing)
- 2026 position: 6th
- Best finish: 6th (2026)
- First race: 2025 Calabogie 150 Clash of the Titans (Calabogie)
- Last race: 2026 NTN BCA 200 (Delaware)
- First win: 2025 Calabogie 150 Clash of the Titans (Calabogie)
Wins	Top tens	Poles
1	10	0
- Statistics up to date as of September 20, 2026.

Connor Bell (born July 30, 2005) is a Canadian professional stock car racing driver. He competes full-time in the NASCAR Canada Series, driving the Nos. 3/8 Chevrolet for Ed Hakonson Racing.

== Racing career ==
Bell spent time in karting, and has also competed in the Super Production Challenge Series and in Radicals at tracks such as Sebring and Toronto Indy. In 2025, he made his NASCAR Canada Series debut at Calabogie Motorsports Park, a track where he has run hundreds of laps in testing. Bell was the fastest in final practice for the race by 0.004 seconds and qualified fifth for the race. In the series' debut at the track, Bell scored the win, rebounding from an earlier speeding penalty and holding off Alex Guenette on the final lap.

In just his second NASCAR Canada start, Bell delivered another standout performance in the WeatherTech 200 on August 31 at Canadian Tire Motorsports Park. After qualifying eleventh, Bell advanced through the field despite mechanical issues that left him without a clutch pedal. In dramatic fashion, he pulled off a last-corner pass to secure second place. Bell became the first driver in NASCAR Canada Series history to reach the podium in each of his first two career starts.

== Motorsports career results ==
=== NASCAR ===
(key) (Bold – Pole position awarded by qualifying time. Italics – Pole position earned by points standings or practice time. * – Most laps led.)

==== Canada Series ====
NASCAR Canada Series results
Year	Team	No.	Make	1	2	3	4	5	6	7	8	9	10	11	12	13	14	NCSC	Pts	Ref
2025	Ed Hakonson Racing	3	Chevy	MSP	RIS	EDM	SAS	CMP; 1	ACD	CTR	ICAR	MSP; 2	DEL	DEL	AMS			26th	89	
2026	Ed Hakonson Racing	3	Chevy	MSP; 8						CMP; 6			CTR; 13	MAR; 4	ICAR; 6	MSP; 34		6th	455	
2026	Ed Hakonson Racing	8	Chevy		ACD; 11	ACD; 11	RIS; 9	AMS; 15	AMS; 15		EIR; 10	EIR; 10					DEL; 10	6th	455	

^{*} Season still in progress
