= Domenic Scrivo =

Canadian racing driver (born 1967)

- Born: November 6, 1967 (age 59); Alliston, Ontario, Canada
- Achievements: 2025 NASCAR Canada Series Rookie of the Year

NASCAR Canada Series career
- 23 races run over 3 years
- Car no., team: No. 69 (MBS Motorsports)
- 2026 position: 13th
- Best finish: 11th (2025)
- First race: 2024 Ebay Motors 200 (Mosport)
- Last race: 2026 NTN BCA 200 (Delaware)
Wins	Top tens	Poles
0	1	0
- Statistics up to date as of September 13, 2026.

Domenic Scrivo (born November 6, 1967) is a Canadian professional stock car racing driver. He competes part-time in the NASCAR Canada Series, driving the No. 69 Chevrolet for MBS Motorsports. Scrivo was the 2025 Rookie of the Year in the series.

== Racing career ==
Scrivo's career in motorsports began in 2012, when his friend brought him to Mosport for a lapping day in a Chevrolet Corvette ZR1.

Scrivo made his NASCAR Canada Series debut in 2024, driving the No. 69 Chevrolet at Canadian Tire Motorsport Park, where he finished on the lead lap in eighteenth. Scrivo competed in three other races during the 2024 season, scoring a best finish of 13th at Circuit Trois-Rivières. Scrivo returned to the No. 69 in 2025, first competing in the Clarington 200, where he would crash out after 17 laps and finish in 25th. He competed in the inaugural series race at Calabogie Motorsports Park, scoring his first career top-ten in ninth. He would finish 19th in the Grand Prix de Trois-Rivières. Scrivo ran the remainder of the season, finishing in the top-20 in each race. He was awarded Rookie of the Year at the end of the season. Scrivo planned to compete full-time in 2026. He would run at Canadian Tire Motorsport park but skipped the doubleheader at Autodrome Chaudière and the race at Riverside International Speedway.

== Personal life ==
Scrivo founded Sierra Excavating Enterprises Inc. in 1988.

== Motorsports career results ==
=== NASCAR ===
(key) (Bold – Pole position awarded by qualifying time. Italics – Pole position earned by points standings or practice time. * – Most laps led.)

==== Canada Series ====
NASCAR Canada Series results
Year	Team	No.	Make	1	2	3	4	5	6	7	8	9	10	11	12	13	14	NCSC	Pts	Ref
2024	MBS Motorsports	69	Chevy	MSP; 18	ACD	AVE	RIS	RIS	OSK	SAS	EIR	CTR; 13	ICAR; 24	MSP; 18	DEL	AMS		26th	103	
2025	MBS Motorsports	69	Chevy	MSP; 25	RIS	EDM	SAS	CMP; 9	ACD	CTR; 19	ICAR; 13	MSP; 16	DEL; 12	DEL; 12	AMS; 19			11th	227	
2026	MBS Motorsports	69	Chevy	MSP; 16	ACD	ACD	RIS	AMS; 17	AMS; 16	CMP; 25	EIR; 13	EIR; 13	CTR; 30	MAR; 15	ICAR; 16	MSP; 20	DEL; 11	13th	292	

^{*} Season still in progress
^{1} Ineligible for series points
