= 2026 NTN BCA 200 =

14th race of the 2026 NASCAR Canada Series

Race details
- Race 14 of 14 in the 2026 NASCAR Canada Series season
- Date: September 12, 2026
- Official name: 2026 NTN BCA 200 presented by APC
- Location: Delaware Speedway in Delaware, Ontario, Canada
- Course: Permanent racing facility
- Course length: 0.500 miles (0.805 km)
- Distance: 200 laps, 100 mi (160.934 km)
- Average speed: 67.077 miles per hour (107.950 km/h)

Pole position
Driver	Marc-Antoine Camirand	Paillé Course//Racing
- Time: 19.437

Most laps led
Driver	Donald Theetge	Theetge Motorsports
- Laps: 156

Winner
No. 80	Donald Theetge	Theetge Motorsports

Television in the United States
- Network: REV TV on YouTube

The 2026 NTN BCA 200 was the fourteenth and final stock car race of the 2026 NASCAR Canada Series. The race was held on Saturday, September 12, 2026, at Delaware Speedway, a 0.500 mi (0.805 km) oval shaped racetrack in Delaware, Ontario, Canada. Donald Theetge led over half of the race and would take the lead back from Connor Bell with 21 laps to go, scoring the win over Kevin Lacroix and D. J. Kennington, the latter of which was making his first start in the Rick Ware Racing No. 51. It was Theetge's third straight win at the track, as he had won both races of the doubleheader at the track in 2025. Marc-Antoine Camirand, who had secured the championship Sunday at Canadian Tire Motorsport Park, was officially crowned champion, his fourth title and third consecutively, while Bell was awarded Jostens Rookie of the Year.

== Report ==
=== Background ===
Delaware Speedway is a 0.500 mi (0.805 km) paved race track that is one of the oldest continuously operating tracks in Canada. It is located a few minutes west of London, Ontario northeast of Delaware, Ontario. It hosts stock car racing every Friday night during the summer. The track opened in 1952 as a 0.250 mi (0.402 km) dirt track that was paved in 1960. In August 1969, the track was expanded to a 0.500 mi (0.805 km) paved oval and continues today.

==== Entry list ====
- (R) denotes rookie driver.
- (i) denotes driver who is ineligible for series driver points.

#	Driver	Team	Make
3	Alex Tagliani	Ed Hakonson Racing	Chevrolet
8	Connor Bell (R)	Ed Hakonson Racing	Chevrolet
10	Rob Naismith	MRN Racing Inc.	Chevrolet
16	Nicholas Barrette (R)	Boissonneault Racing Team	Chevrolet
22	Kyle Steckly	MBS Motorsports	Chevrolet
27	Andrew Ranger	Innovation Auto Sport	Chevrolet
28	Frédérik Ladouceur (R)	DJK Racing	Dodge
47	L. P. Dumoulin	Dumoulin Compétition	Dodge
51	D. J. Kennington	Rick Ware Racing	Dodge
69	Domenic Scrivo	MBS Motorsports	Chevrolet
74	Kevin Lacroix	Innovation Auto Sport	Chevrolet
76	Cayden Lapcevich	Glenn Styres Racing with Velocity Race Cars	Chevrolet
80	Donald Theetge	Theetge Motorsports	Chevrolet
83	Martin Goulet Jr. (R)	Goulet Motorsports	Chevrolet
84	Larry Jackson	Larry Jackson Racing	Dodge
85	Howie Scannell Jr.	Larry Jackson Racing	Dodge
96	Marc-Antoine Camirand	Paillé Course//Racing	Chevrolet
98	Brad Ranson (R)	Bray Autosport	Ford

== Practice ==
Practice was held on Saturday, September 12, at 12:00 PM EST. Kyle Steckly would set the fastest time in the session with a lap of 18.991 seconds and a speed of 94.782 mph (152.5367 km/h).

Pos.	#	Driver	Team	Make	Time	Speed
1	22	Kyle Steckly	MBS Motorsports	Chevrolet	18.991	94.782
2	76	Cayden Lapcevich	Glenn Styres Racing with Velocity Race Cars	Chevrolet	19.211	93.696
3	80	Donald Theetge	Theetge Motorsports	Chevrolet	19.246	93.526
Full practice results

== Qualifying ==
Qualifying was held on Saturday, September 12, at 3:15 PM EST. Marc-Antoine Camirand, driving for Paillé Course//Racing, would win the pole with a lap of 19.437 second and a speed of 92.607 mph (149.037 km/h).

=== Qualifying results ===
Pos.	#	Driver	Team	Make	Time	Speed
1	96	Marc-Antoine Camirand	Paillé Course//Racing	Chevrolet	19.437	92.607
2	80	Donald Theetge	Theetge Motorsports	Chevrolet	19.446	92.564
3	22	Kyle Steckly	MBS Motorsports	Chevrolet	19.448	92.555
4	74	Kevin Lacroix	Innovation Auto Sport	Chevrolet	19.468	92.459
5	3	Alex Tagliani	Ed Hakonson Racing	Chevrolet	19.512	92.251
6	47	L. P. Dumoulin	Dumoulin Compétition	Dodge	19.551	92.067
7	51	D. J. Kennington	Rick Ware Racing	Dodge	19.581	91.926
8	76	Cayden Lapcevich	Glenn Styres Racing with Velocity Race Cars	Chevrolet	19.583	91.916
9	16	Nicholas Barrette (R)	Boissonneault Racing Team	Chevrolet	19.713	91.310
10	84	Larry Jackson	Larry Jackson Racing	Dodge	19.733	91.218
11	8	Connor Bell (R)	Ed Hakonson Racing	Chevrolet	19.767	91.061
12	27	Andrew Ranger	Innovation Auto Sport	Chevrolet	19.808	90.872
13	83	Martin Goulet Jr. (R)	Goulet Motorsports	Chevrolet	19.873	90.575
14	85	Howie Scannell Jr.	Larry Jackson Racing	Dodge	–	–
15	28	Frédérik Ladouceur (R)	DJK Racing	Dodge	–	–
16	69	Domenic Scrivo	MBS Motorsports	Chevrolet	–	–
17	10	Rob Naismith	MRN Racing Inc.	Chevrolet	–	–
18	98	Brad Ranson (R)	Bray Autosport	Ford	–	–
Full qualifying results

== Race results ==
Pos	St	#	Driver	Team	Manufacturer	Laps	Led	Status	Points
1	2	80	Donald Theetge	Theetge Motorsports	Chevrolet	200	156	Running	48
2	4	74	Kevin Lacroix	Innovation Auto Sport	Chevrolet	200	10	Running	43
3	7	51	D. J. Kennington	Rick Ware Racing	Dodge	200	9	Running	42
4	1	96	Marc-Antoine Camirand	Paillé Course//Racing	Chevrolet	200	0	Running	40
5	3	22	Kyle Steckly	MBS Motorsports	Chevrolet	200	0	Running	39
6	6	47	L. P. Dumoulin	Dumoulin Compétition	Dodge	200	0	Running	38
7	10	84	Larry Jackson	Larry Jackson Racing	Dodge	200	0	Running	37
8	12	27	Andrew Ranger	Innovation Auto Sport	Chevrolet	200	0	Running	36
9	5	3	Alex Tagliani	Ed Hakonson Racing	Chevrolet	200	0	Running	35
10	11	8	Connor Bell (R)	Ed Hakonson Racing	Chevrolet	200	25	Running	35
11	16	69	Domenic Scrivo	MBS Motorsports	Chevrolet	200	0	Running	33
12	18	98	Brad Ranson (R)	Bray Autosport	Ford	198	0	Running	32
13	8	76	Cayden Lapcevich	Glenn Styres Racing with Velocity Race Cars	Chevrolet	195	0	Running	31
14	9	16	Nicholas Barrette (R)	Boissonneault Racing Team	Chevrolet	190	0	Accident	30
15	17	10	Rob Naismith (R)	MRN Racing Inc.	Chevrolet	150	0	Accident	29
16	13	83	Martin Goulet Jr. (R)	Goulet Motorsports	Chevrolet	93	0	Brakes	28
17	15	28	Frédérik Ladouceur (R)	DJK Racing	Dodge	42	0	Mechanical	27
18	14	85	Howie Scannell Jr.	Larry Jackson Racing	Dodge	12	0	Mechanical	26

== Standings after the race ==
	Pos	Driver	Points
	1	Marc-Antoine Camirand	621
	2	L. P. Dumoulin	534 (–87)
	3	Kevin Lacroix	508 (–113)
1	4	D. J. Kennington	474 (–147)
1	5	Andrew Ranger	470 (–151)
	6	Alex Tagliani	455 (–166)
	7	Connor Bell	455 (–166)
1	8	Larry Jackson	423 (–198)
1	9	Alex Guenette	412 (–209)
	10	Donald Theetge	408 (–213)

Previous race: 2026 WeatherTech 200	NASCAR Canada Series; 2026 season	Next race: TBA
