= Innovation Auto Sport =

Canadian stock car racing team

- Owner(s): Kevin Lacroix; Mathieu Kingsbury
- Series: NASCAR Canada Series
- Race drivers: 9. Mathieu Kingsbury; 27. Andrew Ranger; 74. Kevin Lacroix
- Manufacturer: Chevrolet

Career
- Debut: 2024
- Races competed: 29
- Drivers' Championships: 0
- Race victories: 12

Innovation Auto Sport, also spelled as Innovation Autosport, is a Canadian professional auto racing team that currently competes in the NASCAR Canada Series. Drivers Kevin Lacroix and Mathieu Kingsbury formed the team in 2024.

== NASCAR Canada Series ==
=== Car No. 9 History ===
The team fielded the No. 9 part-time for Mathieu Kingsbury in 2024. Kingsbury would continue driving the car in 2025, this time on a full time basis.

==== Car No. 9 Results ====
NASCAR Canada Series results
Year	Driver	No.	Make	1	2	3	4	5	6	7	8	9	10	11	12	13	14	NCSC	Pts	Ref
2024	Mathieu Kingsbury	9	Dodge	MSP	ACD; 15	AVE; 15	RIS	RIS	OSK	SAS	EIR	CTR	ICAR	MSP	DEL	AMS; 4			98	
2025	Mathieu Kingsbury	9	Chevy	MSP; 15	RIS; 5	EDM; 7	SAS; 7	CMP; 7	ACD; 5	CTR; 13	ICAR; 7	MSP; 22	DEL; 8	DEL; 8	AMS; 7				419	
2026	Mathieu Kingsbury	9	Chevy	MSP; 20	ACD; 7	ACD; 5	RIS; 6	AMS	AMS	CMP	EDM	EDM	CTR	MAR	ICAR	MSP	DEL	-*	-*	

=== Car No. 27 History ===
The team fields the No. 27 for Andrew Ranger in partnership with Paillé Course//Racing. He scored the team's first win in 2024 at Autodrome Chaudière. He would win the next race of the season at Eastbound International Speedway. He would score a third win later in the season at Circuit ICAR. Ranger returned in 2025, continuing to drive Innovation Auto Sport cars under the Paillé Course//Racing banner.

==== Car No. 27 Results ====
NASCAR Canada Series results
Year	Driver	No.	Make	1	2	3	4	5	6	7	8	9	10	11	12	13	14	NCSC	Pts	Ref
2024	Andrew Ranger	27	Chevy	MSP; 8	ACD; 1	AVE; 1*	RIS; 6	RIS; 8	OSK; 2	SAS; 3	EIR; 7	CTR; 14	ICAR; 1	MSP; 4	DEL; 2	AMS; 19			488	
2025	Andrew Ranger	27	Chevy	MSP; 6	RIS; 4	EDM; 4	SAS; 8	CMP; 5	ACD; 14	CTR; 1*	ICAR; 2	MSP; 5	DEL; 4	DEL; 7	AMS; 6				470	
2026	Andrew Ranger	27	Chevy	MSP; 19	ACD; 5	ACD; 7	RIS; 7	AMS	AMS	CMP	EDM	EDM	CTR	MAR	ICAR	MSP	DEL	-*	-*	

=== Car No. 74 History ===
Kevin Lacroix would drive the No. 74 in 2024. Lacroix would score six wins during the season and finish second in points, only 10 points behind Marc-Antoine Camirand. Lacroix returned full time in 2025, originally set to drive a Dodge as he had in past seasons. However, he would end up running a Chevrolet like his teammates. In the 2025 Leland Industries 250, Lacroix lost the lead on the final lap to Marc-Antoine Camirand, but Camirand was penalized for rough driving and Lacroix was awarded the win, his first of the season.

==== Car No. 74 Results ====
NASCAR Canada Series results
Year	Driver	No.	Make	1	2	3	4	5	6	7	8	9	10	11	12	13	14	NCSC	Pts	Ref
2024	Kevin Lacroix	74	Dodge	MSP; 28	ACD; 2	AVE; 2	RIS; 1*	RIS; 1*	OSK; 7	SAS; 2	EIR; 1*	CTR; 23	ICAR; 2*	MSP; 1*	DEL; 1*	AMS; 1*			538	
2025	Kevin Lacroix	74	Chevy	MSP; 8	RIS; 6	EDM; 3	SAS; 1*	CMP; 24	ACD; 3	CTR; 10	ICAR; 4	MSP; 24	DEL; 3	DEL; 3	AMS; 9				438	
2026	Kevin Lacroix	74	Chevy	MSP; 27	ACD; 10	ACD; 6	RIS; 1*	AMS	AMS	CMP	EDM	EDM	CTR	MAR	ICAR	MSP	DEL	-*	-*	
