= 2024 Leland Industries 250 =

7th race of the 2024 NASCAR Canada Series

Race details
- Race 7 of 13 in the 2024 NASCAR Canada Series season
- Date: July 20, 2024
- Location: Sutherland Automotive Speedway in Saskatoon, Saskatchewan, Canada
- Course: Permanent racing facility
- Course length: 0.333 miles (0.536 km)
- Distance: 250 laps, 83.250 mi (133.977 km)
- Average speed: 68.347 mph (109.994 km/h)

Pole position
Driver	Marc-Antoine Camirand	Paillé Racing
- Time: 14.915

Most laps led
Driver	Marc-Antoine Camirand	Paillé Racing
- Laps: 118

Winner
No. 96	Marc-Antoine Camirand	Paillé Racing

The 2024 Leland Industries 250 was the seventh stock car race of the 2024 NASCAR Canada Series. The race was held on July 20, 2024, at Sutherland Automotive Speedway, located in Saskatoon, Saskatchewan, Canada. The race was 250 laps, or 83.250 mi (133.977 km), with a three-minute race break after the halfway point. Winner of the previous race in the season, Marc-Antoine Camirand, started on the pole. Camirand battled for the lead with Andrew Ranger and Kevin Lacroix, who both led laps in the event. Camirand fought his way past Ranger and Lacroix, challenging for the lead with 24 laps remaining, and would go on to win the race, his second in a row. Camirand led the most laps, leading for 118 of the 250 laps.

== Report ==
=== Background ===
Sutherland Automotive Speedway is a paved oval auto racing facility just north of Saskatoon, Saskatchewan, Canada. It is owned and operated by the Saskatoon Stock Car Racing Association Ltd. (SSCRA). Construction of the 0.333 mi (0.536 km) walled track with progressive banking began in April 2005. The track opened in July 2006, a year ahead of schedule.

==== Entry list ====
- (R) denotes rookie driver.
- (i) denotes driver who is ineligible for series driver points.

#	Driver	Team	Make
0	Glenn Styres	Glenn Styres Racing	Chevrolet
3	Jason Hathaway	Ed Hakonson Racing	Chevrolet
17	D. J. Kennington	DJK Racing	Dodge
24	Thomas Nepveu	Dave Jacombs Racing	Ford
27	Andrew Ranger	Wight Motorsports Inc.	Chevrolet
28	Matthew Shirley (R)	DJK Racing	Dodge
43	Shantel Kalika	Busch Racing	Dodge
46	Jamie Krzysik	Krzysik Racing	Chevrolet
47	L.P. Dumoulin	Dumoulin Compétition	Dodge
64	Mark Dilley	Wight Motorsports Inc.	Chevrolet
74	Kevin Lacroix	Innovation Auto Sport	Dodge
80	Donald Theetge	Group Theetge	Chevrolet
84	Larry Jackson	Larry Jackson Racing	Dodge
96	Marc-Antoine Camirand	Paillé Racing	Chevrolet

== Practice ==
The first and only practice session was held on Saturday, July 20, at 2:15 PM CT. Donald Theetge, driving for Group Theetge, would set the fastest time in the session, with a lap of 15.003 and a speed of 79.904 mph (128.593 km/h).

Pos.	#	Driver	Team	Make	Time	Speed
1	80	Donald Theetge	Group Theetge	Chevrolet	15.003	79.904
2	74	Kevin Lacroix	Innovation Auto Sport	Dodge	15.029	79.766
3	27	Andrew Ranger	Wight Motorsports Inc.	Chevrolet	15.063	79.586
Full practice results

== Qualifying ==
Qualifying was held on Saturday, July 20, at 4:35 PM CT. Marc-Antoine Camirand, driving for Paillé Racing, would win the pole, with a lap of 14.915 and a speed of 80.375 mph (129.351 km/h).

=== Qualifying results ===
Pos.	#	Driver	Team	Make	Time	Speed
1	96	Marc-Antoine Camirand	Paillé Racing	Chevrolet	14.915	80.375
2	74	Kevin Lacroix	Innovation Auto Sport	Dodge	14.960	80.134
3	27	Andrew Ranger	Wight Motorsports Inc.	Chevrolet	14.971	80.075
4	3	Jason Hathaway	Ed Hakonson Racing	Chevrolet	15.021	79.808
5	80	Donald Theetge	Group Theetge	Chevrolet	15.038	79.718
6	46	Jamie Krzysik	Krzysik Racing	Chevrolet	15.078	79.507
7	64	Mark Dilley	Wight Motorsports Inc.	Chevrolet	15.094	79.422
8	17	D. J. Kennington	DJK Racing	Dodge	15.142	79.171
9	84	Larry Jackson	Larry Jackson Racing	Dodge	15.146	79.150
10	24	Thomas Nepveu	Dave Jacombs Racing	Ford	15.166	79.045
11	47	L.P. Dumoulin	Dumoulin Compétition	Dodge	15.172	79.014
12	28	Matthew Shirley (R)	DJK Racing	Dodge	15.174	79.004
13	43	Shantel Kalika	Busch Racing	Dodge	15.308	78.312
14	0	Glenn Styres	Glenn Styres Racing	Chevrolet	15.420	77.743
Official starting lineup

== Race results ==
Pos	St	#	Driver	Team	Manufacturer	Laps	Led	Status	Points
1	1	96	Marc-Antoine Camirand	Paillé Racing	Chevrolet	250	118	Running	48
2	2	74	Kevin Lacroix	Innovation Auto Spiort	Dodge	250	48	Running	43
3	3	27	Andrew Ranger	Wight Motorsports Inc.	Chevrolet	250	84	Running	42
4	11	47	L.P. Dumoulin	Dumoulin Compétition	Dodge	250	0	Running	40
5	4	3	Jason Hathway	Ed Hakonson Racing	Chevrolet	250	0	Running	39
6	8	17	D.J. Kennington	DJK Racing	Dodge	250	0	Running	38
7	5	80	Donald Theetge	Group Theetge	Chevrolet	248	0	Running	37
8	14	0	Glenn Styres	Glenn Styres Racing	Chevrolet	248	0	Running	36
9	9	84	Larry Jackson	Larry Jackson Racing	Dodge	246	0	Running	35
10	13	43	Shantel Kalika	Busch Racing	Dodge	245	0	Running	34
11	12	28	Matthew Shirley (R)	DJK Racing	Dodge	244	0	Running	33
12	10	24	Thomas Nepveu	Dave Jacombs Racing	Ford	161	0	Overheating	32
13	6	46	Jamie Krzysik	Krzysik Racing	Chevrolet	148	0	Suspension	31
14	7	64	Mark Dilley	Wight Motorsports Inc.	Chevrolet	71	0	Electrical	30

== Standings after the race ==
	Pos	Driver	Points
	1	Marc-Antoine Camirand	297
	2	Andrew Ranger	290 (-7)
	3	Kevin Lacroix	281 (-16)
	4	L.P. Dumoulin	269 (-28)
	5	Jason Hathaway	262 (-35)
	6	D. J. Kennington	253 (-44)
	7	Larry Jackson	222 (-75)
	8	Donald Theetge	214 (-83)
1	9	Glenn Styres	208 (-89)
1	10	Thomas Nepveu	207 (-90)

- Note: Only the first 10 positions are included for the driver standings.

Previous race: 2024 Freshstone Dirt Classic	NASCAR Canada Series; 2024 season	Next race: 2024 NAPA 300
