= 2026 Bud Light 125 =

2nd race of the 2026 NASCAR Canada Series

Race details
- Race 2 of 14 in the 2026 NASCAR Canada Series season
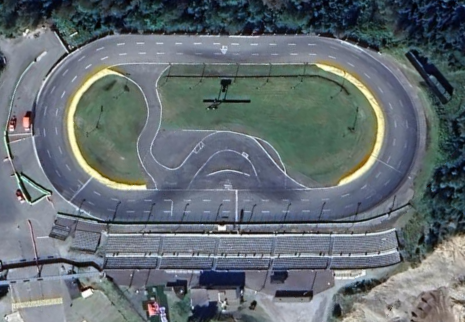
- Date: June 7, 2026
- Location: Autodrome Chaudière in Vallée-Jonction, Quebec, Canada
- Course: Permanent racing facility
- Course length: 0.250 miles (0.402 km)
- Distance: 125 laps, 31.25 mi (50.29 km)
- Average speed: 46.992 miles per hour (75.626 km/h)

Pole position
Driver	Marc-Antoine Camirand	Paillé Course//Racing

Most laps led
Driver	Marc-Antoine Camirand	Paillé Course//Racing
- Laps: 113

Winner
No. 96	Marc-Antoine Camirand	Paillé Course//Racing

Television in the United States
- Network: REV TV on YouTube

The 2026 Bud Light 125 was the second race of the 2026 NASCAR Canada Series. The race was originally scheduled for Saturday, June 6, 2026, but was moved to the following day, June 7, due to weather, at Autodrome Chaudière, a 0.250 mi (0.402 km) oval shaped racetrack in Vallée-Jonction, Quebec, Canada and was the first race of a doubleheader. Marc-Antoine Camirand was able to hold off a charge from Donald Theetge on the final restart and score his first win of the season. Theetge finished in second, with Will Larue narrowly beating Alex Labbé to secure the third position.

== Report ==
=== Background ===
Autodrome Chaudière is a 0.250 mi (0.402 km), high banked, asphalt short track located in Vallée-Jonction, Quebec, Canada, about 65 km (40 mi) south of Quebec City. The circuit opened in 1992 as a dirt track. In 2005, the track underwent resurfacing to convert it into an asphalt track.

==== Entry list ====
- (R) denotes rookie driver.
- (i) denotes driver who is ineligible for series driver points.

#	Driver	Team	Make
0	Glenn Styres	Glenn Styres Racing	Chevrolet
3	Alex Tagliani	Ed Hakonson Racing	Chevrolet
8	Connor Bell (R)	Ed Hakonson Racing	Chevrolet
9	Mathieu Kingsbury	Innovation Auto Sport	Chevrolet
10	Rob Naismith (R)	MRN Racing Inc.	Chevrolet
17	D. J. Kennington	DJK Racing	Dodge
27	Andrew Ranger	Innovation Auto Sport	Chevrolet
36	Alex Labbé	LL Motorsports	Chevrolet
37	Simon Dion-Viens	SDV Autosport	Dodge
38	Mike Goudie	RGR Motorsports	Ford
39	Alex Guenette	JASS Racing with XEMIS Racing	Chevrolet
45	William Larue (R)	Larue Motorsports	Chevrolet
47	L. P. Dumoulin	Dumoulin Compétition	Dodge
54	Dave Coursol	Coursol Performance	Chevrolet
74	Kevin Lacroix	Innovation Auto Sport	Chevrolet
80	Donald Theetge	Theetge Motorsports	Chevrolet
83	Martin Goulet Jr. (R)	Goulet Motorsports	Chevrolet
84	Larry Jackson	Larry Jackson Racing	Dodge
85	Herby Drescher	Larry Jackson Racing	Dodge
96	Marc-Antoine Camirand	Paillé Course//Racing	Chevrolet

== Practice ==
Two practice sessions were scheduled for Saturday, June 6, with the first scheduled for 11:20 AM EST and the second scheduled for 12:55 PM EST. Activity at the track was canceled due to weather.

== Qualifying ==
Qualifying was scheduled for Saturday, June 6, at 4:00 PM EST. Due to the cancellation of on-track activity on Saturday, the starting lineup was set by the rulebook, using points from the previous season.

=== Starting lineup ===
Pos.	#	Driver	Team	Make
1	96	Marc-Antoine Camirand	Paillé Course//Racing	Chevrolet
2	17	D. J. Kennington	DJK Racing	Dodge
3	27	Andrew Ranger	Innovation Auto Sport	Chevrolet
4	80	Donald Theetge	Theetge Motorsports	Chevrolet
5	74	Kevin Lacroix	Innovation Auto Sport	Chevrolet
6	3	Alex Tagliani	Ed Hakonson Racing	Chevrolet
7	47	L. P. Dumoulin	Dumoulin Compétition	Dodge
8	9	Mathieu Kingsbury	Innovation Auto Sport	Chevrolet
9	84	Larry Jackson	Larry Jackson Racing	Dodge
10	39	Alex Guenette	JASS Racing with XEMIS Racing	Chevrolet
11	54	Dave Coursol	Coursol Performance	Chevrolet
12	36	Alex Labbé	LL Motorsports	Chevrolet
13	45	Will Larue (R)	Larue Motorsports	Chevrolet
14	8	Connor Bell (R)	Ed Hakonson Racing	Chevrolet
15	85	Herby Drescher	Larry Jackson Racing	Dodge
16	0	Glenn Styres	Glenn Styres Racing	Chevrolet
17	38	Michael Goudie	RGR Motorsports	Ford
18	37	Simon Dion-Viens	SDV Autosport	Dodge
19	83	Martin Goulet Jr. (R)	Goulet Motorsports	Chevrolet
20	10	Rob Naismith (R)	MRN Racing Inc.	Chevrolet

== Race results ==
Pos	St	#	Driver	Team	Manufacturer	Laps	Led	Status	Points
1	1	96	Marc-Antoine Camirand	Paillé Course//Racing	Chevrolet	125	113	Running	45
2	4	80	Donald Theetge	Theetge Motorsports	Chevrolet	125	12	Running	43
3	13	45	Will Larue (R)	Larue Motorsports	Chevrolet	125	0	Running	41
4	12	36	Alex Labbé	LL Motorsports	Chevrolet	125	0	Running	40
5	3	27	Andrew Ranger	Innovation Auto Sport	Chevrolet	125	0	Running	39
6	2	17	D. J. Kennington	DJK Racing	Dodge	125	0	Running	38
7	8	9	Mathieu Kingsburg	Innovation Auto Sport	Chevrolet	125	0	Running	37
8	19	83	Martin Goulet Jr. (R)	Goulet Motorsports	Chevrolet	125	0	Running	36
9	18	37	Simon Dion-Viens	SDV Autosport	Dodge	125	0	Running	35
10	5	74	Kevin Lacroix	Innovation Auto Sport	Chevrolet	125	0	Running	34
11	14	8	Connor Bell (R)	Ed Hakonson Racing	Chevrolet	125	0	Running	33
12	20	10	Rob Naismith (R)	MRN Racing Inc.	Chevrolet	125	0	Running	32
13	9	84	Larry Jackson	Larry Jackson Racing	Dodge	125	0	Running	31
14	10	39	Alex Guenette	JASS Racing with XEMIS Racing	Chevrolet	123	0	Running	30
15	11	54	Dave Coursol	Coursol Performance	Chevrolet	113	0	Running	29
16	7	47	L. P. Dumoulin	Dumoulin Compétition	Dodge	109	0	Accident	28
17	6	3	Alex Tagliani	Ed Hakonson Racing	Chevrolet	109	0	Accident	27
18	16	0	Glenn Styres	Glenn Styres Racing	Chevrolet	78	0	Running	26
19	17	38	Michael Goudie	RGR Motorsports	Ford	47	0	Suspension	25
20	15	85	Herby Drescher	Larry Jackson Racing	Dodge	4	0	Ignition	24

== Standings after the race ==
	Pos	Driver	Points
9	1	Marc-Antoine Camirand	83
6	2	D. J. Kennington	73 (–10)
1	3	L. P. Dumoulin	71 (–12)
	4	Alex Guenette	70 (–13)
3	5	Connor Bell	69 (–14)
12	6	Will Larue	68 (–15)
12	7	Andrew Ranger	65 (–18)
3	8	Dave Coursol	62 (–21)
11	9	Mathieu Kingsbury	61 (–22)
13	10	Larry Jackson	52 (–31)

Previous race: 2026 CarGurus 200	NASCAR Canada Series; 2026 season	Next race: 2026 Michelob Ultra 125
