= 2024 Freshstone Dirt Classic =

6th race of the 2024 NASCAR Canada Series

Race details
- Race 6 of 13 in the 2024 NASCAR Canada Series season
- Date: July 11, 2024
- Location: Ohsweken Speedway in Ohsweken, Ontario, Canada
- Course: Permanent racing facility
- Course length: 0.375 miles (0.604 km)
- Distance: 100 laps, 37.500 mi (60.350 km)
- Average speed: 57.054 km/h (35.452 mph)

Pole position
Driver	Chase Briscoe	Dave Jacombs Racing
- Grid positions set by heat results

Most laps led
Driver	Marc-Antoine Camirand	Paillé Racing
- Laps: 92

Winner
No. 96	Marc-Antoine Camirand	Paillé Racing

The 2024 Freshstone Dirt Classic was the sixth stock car race of the 2024 NASCAR Canada Series. The race was held on July 11, 2024 at Ohsweken Speedway, a 0.604 km (0.375 mi) oval shaped dirt track located in Ohsweken, Ontario, Canada. The race was 100 laps, or 60.350 km (37.500 mi). NASCAR Cup Series regular Chase Briscoe started on the pole. Briscoe lost the lead after suffering a flat tire during a lap 8 caution. He would later rebound and battle with Ken Schrader, but Marc-Antoine Camirand had the car to beat, outpacing the field on each restart. Camirand would go on to win the race, his second win of the 2024 season. Camirand led 92 of the 100 laps.

== Report ==
=== Background ===
The Ohsweken Speedway is a 0.375 miles (0.604 km) dirt track in the village of Ohsweken, Ontario, Canada. In 1994, race car driver Glenn Styres built the 0.375 miles (0.604 km) mile track on 80 acres (32 ha) of Styres family-owned land on the Six Nations of the Grand River First Nation Reserve southeast of Brantford, Ontario.

==== Entry list ====
- (R) denotes rookie driver.
- (i) denotes driver who is ineligible for series driver points.

#	Driver	Team	Make
0	Glenn Styres	Glenn Styres Racing	Chevrolet
1	Chase Briscoe	Dave Jacombs Racing	Ford
3	Jason Hathaway	Ed Hakonson Racing	Chevrolet
4	Trevor Monaghan	Trevor Monaghan Motorsports	Dodge
17	D. J. Kennington	DJK Racing	Dodge
22	Kyle Steckly	22 Racing	Chevrolet
24	Thomas Nepveu	Dave Jacombs Racing	Ford
27	Andrew Ranger	Wight Motorsports Inc.	Chevrolet
29	Steve Cote (R)	Allrem Racing	Chevrolet
31	Daniel Bois	MBS Motorsports	Chevrolet
32	Cayden Lapcevich	Glenn Styres Racing	Chevrolet
47	L. P. Dumoulin	Dumoulin Compétition	Dodge
52	Ken Schrader	22 Racing	Chevrolet
74	Kevin Lacroix	Innovation Auto Sport	Dodge
80	Donald Theetge	Group Theetge	Chevrolet
84	Larry Jackson	Larry Jackson Racing	Dodge
96	Marc-Antoine Camirand	Paillé Racing	Chevrolet
98	Bryan Cathcart	Jim Bray Autosport	Ford
99	Amber Balcaen	Larry Jackson Racing	Dodge

== Practice ==
The first and only practice session was held on Thursday, July 11, at 6:30 PM EST. Kevin Lacroix would set the fastest time in the session, with a lap of 19.825 and a speed of 68.096 mph (109.590 km/h).

Pos.	#	Driver	Team	Make	Time	Speed
1	74	Kevin Lacroix	Innovation Auto Sport	Dodge	19.825	68.096
2	27	Andrew Ranger	Wight Motorsports Inc.	Chevrolet	19.900	67.839
3	96	Marc-Antoine Camirand	Paillé Racing	Chevrolet	19.925	67.754
Full practice results

== Qualifying ==
Practice results determined the lineup for the three 10 lap qualifying heat races. The heats were won by Chase Briscoe, Andrew Ranger, and Marc-Antoine Camirand.

=== Heat races ===
==== Heat Race #1 ====
Pos	No.	Driver	Team	Manufacturer
1	1	Chase Briscoe	Dave Jacombs Racing	Ford
2	52	Ken Schrader	22 Racing	Chevrolet
3	29	Steve Cote (R)	Allrem Racing	Chevrolet
4	0	Glenn Styres	Glenn Styres Racing	Chevrolet
5	74	Kevin Lacroix	Innovation Auto Sport	Dodge
6	24	Thomas Nepveu	Dave Jacombs Racing	Ford
Combined heat race results

==== Heat Race #2 ====
Pos	No.	Driver	Team	Manufacturer
1	27	Andrew Ranger	Wight Motorsports Inc.	Chevrolet
2	80	Donald Theetge	Group Theetge	Chevrolet
3	22	Kyle Steckly	22 Racing	Chevrolet
4	17	D. J. Kennington	DJK Racing	Dodge
5	98	Bryan Cathcart	Jim Bray Autosport	Ford
6	32	Cayden Lapcevich	Glenn Styres Racing	Chevrolet
Combined heat race results

==== Heat Race #3 ====
Pos	No.	Driver	Team	Manufacturer
1	96	Marc-Antoine Camirand	Paillé Racing	Chevrolet
2	31	Daniel Bois	MBS Motorsports	Chevrolet
3	4	Trevor Monaghan	Trevor Monaghan Motorsports	Dodge
4	3	Jason Hathaway	Ed Hakonson Racing	Chevrolet
5	99	Amber Balcaen	Larry Jackson Racing	Dodge
6	47	L. P. Dumoulin	Dumoulin Compétition	Dodge
7	84	Larry Jackson	Larry Jackson Racing	Dodge
Combined heat race results

==== Starting lineup ====
Pos	No.	Driver	Team	Manufacturer
1	1	Chase Briscoe	Dave Jacombs Racing	Ford
2	27	Andrew Ranger	Wight Motorsports Inc.	Chevrolet
3	96	Marc-Antoine Camirand	Paillé Racing	Chevrolet
4	52	Ken Schrader	22 Racing	Chevrolet
5	80	Donald Theetge	Group Theetge	Chevrolet
6	31	Daniel Bois	MBS Motorsports	Chevrolet
7	29	Steve Cote (R)	Allrem Racing	Chevrolet
8	22	Kyle Steckly	22 Racing	Chevrolet
9	4	Trevor Monaghan	Trevor Monaghan Motorsports	Dodge
10	0	Glenn Styres	Glenn Styres Racing	Chevrolet
11	17	D. J. Kennington	DJK Racing	Dodge
12	3	Jason Hathaway	Ed Hakonson Racing	Chevrolet
13	74	Kevin Lacroix	Innovation Auto Sport	Dodge
14	98	Bryan Cathcart	Jim Bray Autosport	Ford
15	99	Amber Balcaen	Larry Jackson Racing	Dodge
16	24	Thomas Nepveu	Dave Jacombs Racing	Ford
17	32	Cayden Lapcevich	Glenn Styres Racing	Chevrolet
18	47	L. P. Dumoulin	Dumoulin Compétition	Dodge
19	84	Larry Jackson	Larry Jackson Racing	Dodge
Official starting lineup

== Race results ==
Pos	St	No.	Driver	Team	Manufacturer	Laps	Led	Status	Points
1	3	96	Marc-Antoine Camirand	Paillé Racing	Chevrolet	100	92	Running	48
2	2	27	Andrew Ranger	Wight Motorsports Inc.	Chevrolet	100	1	Running	43
3	4	52	Ken Schrader	22 Racing	Chevrolet	100	0	Running	41
4	8	22	Kyle Steckly	22 Racing	Chevrolet	100	0	Running	40
5	1	1	Chase Briscoe	Dave Jacombs Racing	Ford	100	7	Running	40
6	17	32	Cayden Lapcevich	Glenn Styres Racing	Chevrolet	100	0	Running	38
7	13	74	Kevin Lacroix	Innovation Auto Sport	Dodge	100	0	Running	37
8	7	29	Steve Cote (R)	Allrem Racing	Chevrolet	100	0	Running	36
9	6	31	Daniel Bois	MBS Motorsports	Chevrolet	100	0	Running	35
10	5	80	Donald Theetge	Group Theetge	Chevrolet	100	0	Running	34
11	11	17	D.J. Kennington	DJK Racing	Dodge	100	0	Running	33
12	18	47	L. P. Dumoulin	Dumoulin Compétition	Dodge	100	0	Running	32
13	9	4	Trevor Monaghan	Trevor Monaghan Motorsports	Dodge	100	0	Running	31
14	12	3	Jason Hathaway	Ed Hakonson Racing	Chevrolet	99	0	Running	30
15	19	84	Larry Jackson	Larry Jackson Racing	Dodge	99	0	Running	29
16	16	24	Thomas Nepveu	Dave Jacombs Racing	Ford	97	0	Running	28
17	14	98	Bryan Cathcart	Jim Bray Autosport	Ford	96	0	Running	27
18	10	0	Glenn Styres	Glenn Styres Racing	Chevrolet	46	0	Driveshaft	26
19	15	99	Amber Balcaen	Larry Jackson Racing	Dodge	43	0	Brakes	25

== Standings after the race ==
	Pos	Driver	Points
2	1	Marc-Antoine Camirand	249
1	2	Andrew Ranger	248 (-1)
1	3	Kevin Lacroix	238 (-11)
	4	L. P. Dumoulin	229 (-20)
	5	Jason Hathaway	223 (-26)
	6	D. J. Kennington	215 (-34)
	7	Larry Jackson	187 (-62)
2	8	Donald Theetge	177 (-72)
1	9	Thomas Nepveu	175 (-74)
1	10	Glenn Styres	172 (-77)

- Note: Only the first 10 positions are included for the driver standings.

Previous race: 2024 Choko 150	NASCAR Canada Series; 2024 season	Next race: 2024 Leland Industries 250
