= 2026 CarGurus 200 =

1st race of the 2026 NASCAR Canada Series

Race details
- Race 1 of 14 in the 2026 NASCAR Canada Series season
- Date: May 17, 2026
- Location: Canadian Tire Motorsport Park in Clarington, Ontario, Canada
- Course: 10-turn road course
- Course length: 2.459 miles (3.957 km)
- Distance: 58 laps, 142.622 mi (229.528 km)
- Scheduled distance: 51 laps, 125.41 mi (201.81 km)

Pole position
| Driver | Gary Klutt | Legendary Motorcar Company |
- Time: 1:22.576

Most laps led
| Driver | Gary Klutt | Legendary Motorcar Company |
- Laps: 19

Winner
| No. 19 | Gary Klutt | Legendary Motorcar Company |

The 2026 CarGurus 200 was the first stock car race of the 2026 NASCAR Canada Series. The race was held on Sunday, May 17, 2026, at Canadian Tire Motorsport Park, a 2.459 mi (3.957 km) road course in Clarington, Ontario, Canada. The race went beyond the scheduled 51 lap distance, going into double overtime. Polesitter Gary Klutt took the lead from Kyle Steckly and scored his first NASCAR Canada Series win since 2015. L. P. Dumoulin got by Steckly to finish second, with Steckly rounding out the podium in third.

== Report ==
=== Background ===
Canadian Tire Motorsport Park is a multi-track motorsport venue located north of Bowmanville in Clarington, Ontario, Canada, approximately 75 kilometres (47 miles) east of Toronto. The facility features a 3.957 km (2.459 mi), 10-turn road course; a 2.9 km (1.8 mi) advance driver and race driver training facility with a 0.402 km (0.250 mi) skid pad (Driver Development Centre) and a 1.5 km (0.93 mi) kart track.

==== Entry list ====
- (R) denotes rookie driver.
- (i) denotes driver who is ineligible for series driver points.

| # | Driver | Team | Make |
|---|---|---|---|
| 0 | Glenn Styres | Glenn Styres Racing | Chevrolet |
| 1 | J. P. Bergeron | Prolon Racing | Ford |
| 3 | Connor Bell (R) | Ed Hakonson Racing | Chevrolet |
| 8 | Dexter Stacey | Ed Hakonson Racing | Chevrolet |
| 9 | Mathieu Kingsbury | Innovation Auto Sport | Chevrolet |
| 14 | Geoff Johnson (R) | Powersports Garage | Ford |
| 17 | D. J. Kennington | DJK Racing | Dodge |
| 19 | Keith Bean (R) | BC Race Cars | Chevrolet |
| 22 | Kyle Steckly | MBS Motorsports | Chevrolet |
| 24 | Josh Hurley (R) | BC Race Cars | Ford |
| 27 | Andrew Ranger | Innovation Auto Sport | Chevrolet |
| 28 | Brad Ranson (R) | DJK Racing | Chevrolet |
| 38 | Tyler Gonzalez (R) | RGR Motorsports | Ford |
| 39 | Alex Guenette | JASS Racing with XEMIS Racing | Chevrolet |
| 42 | Ryan Klutt | Legendary Motorcar Company | Dodge |
| 45 | William Larue (R) | Larue Motorsport | Chevrolet |
| 47 | L. P. Dumoulin | Dumoulin Compétition | Dodge |
| 48 | Ron Tomlinson (R) | Tomlinson Motorsports | Chevrolet |
| 54 | Dave Coursol | Coursol Performance | Dodge |
| 67 | David Thorndyke | Promotive Racing | Chevrolet |
| 69 | Domenic Scrivo | MBS Motorsports | Chevrolet |
| 71 | Gary Klutt | Legendary Motorcar Company | Dodge |
| 73 | Sylvain Ouellet (R) | Theetge Motorsport | Chevrolet |
| 74 | Kevin Lacroix | Innovation Auto Sport | Chevrolet |
| 80 | Alex Tagliani | Theetge Motorsport | Chevrolet |
| 84 | Larry Jackson | Larry Jackson Racing | Dodge |
| 85 | Darryl Timmers | Larry Jackson Racing | Dodge |
| 87 | Sam Fellows | Fellows McGraw Racing | Chevrolet |
| 88 | Simon Charbonneau | Eighty8 Racing | Chevrolet |
| 93 | Jacques Guenette Sr. (R) | JASS Racing with XEMIS Racing | Chevrolet |
| 96 | Marc-Antoine Camirand | Paillé Course//Racing | Chevrolet |
| 98 | Malcolm Strachan | Jim Bray Autosport | Ford |

== Practice ==
Two practice sessions were held on Saturday, May 16, the first at 12:45 PM EST and the second at 2:15 PM EST. Connor Bell would set the fastest time in the session, with a lap of 1:22.849 and a speed of 106.850 mph (171.958 km/h).

| Pos. | # | Driver | Team | Make | Time | Speed |
|---|---|---|---|---|---|---|
| 1 | 3 | Connor Bell | Ed Hakonson Racing | Chevrolet | 1:22.849 | 106.850 |
| 2 | 47 | L. P. Dumoulin | Dumoulin Compétition | Dodge | 1:22.989 | 106.670 |
| 3 | 71 | Gary Klutt | Legendary Motorcar Company | Dodge | 1:23.223 | 106.370 |
Full practice results

== Qualifying ==
Qualifying was held on Saturday, May 16, at 5:35 PM EST. Gary Klutt, driving for Legendary Motorcar Company, would win the pole, with a lap of 1:22.576 and a speed of 107.203 mph (172.527 km/h).

=== Qualifying results ===
| Pos. | # | Driver | Team | Make | Time | Speed |
|---|---|---|---|---|---|---|
| 1 | 71 | Gary Klutt | Legendary Motorcar Company | Dodge | 1:22.576 | 107.203 |
| 2 | 96 | Marc-Antoine Camirand | Paillé Course//Racing | Chevrolet | 1:22.697 | 107.046 |
| 3 | 22 | Kyle Steckly | MBS Motorsports | Chevrolet | 1:22.773 | 106.948 |
| 4 | 80 | Alex Tagliani | Theetge Motorsport | Chevrolet | 1:22.857 | 106.839 |
| 5 | 74 | Kevin Lacroix | Innovation Auto Sport | Chevrolet | 1:22.940 | 106.733 |
| 6 | 27 | Andrew Ranger | Innovation Auto Sport | Chevrolet | 1:22.988 | 106.671 |
| 7 | 45 | Will Larue (R) | Larue Motorsport | Chevrolet | 1:23.205 | 106.393 |
| 8 | 17 | D. J. Kennington | DJK Racing | Dodge | 1:23.214 | 106.381 |
| 9 | 87 | Sam Fellows | Fellows McGraw Racing | Chevrolet | 1:23.471 | 106.054 |
| 10 | 38 | Tyler Gonzalez (R) | RGR Motorsports | Ford | 1:23.473 | 106.051 |
| 11 | 39 | Alex Guenette | JASS Racing with XEMIS Racing | Chevrolet | 1:23.513 | 106.000 |
| 12 | 47 | L. P. Dumoulin | Dumoulin Compétition | Dodge | 1:23.585 | 105.909 |
| 13 | 3 | Connor Bell (R) | Ed Hakonson Racing | Chevrolet | 1:23.886 | 105.529 |
| 14 | 98 | Malcolm Strachan | Jim Bray Autosport | Ford | 1:24.041 | 105.334 |
| 15 | 42 | Ryan Klutt | Legendary Motorcar Company | Dodge | 1:24.161 | 105.184 |
| 16 | 1 | J. P. Bergeron | Prolon Racing | Ford | 1:24.304 | 105.006 |
| 17 | 9 | Mathieu Kingsbury | Innovation Auto Sport | Chevrolet | 1:24.482 | 104.784 |
| 18 | 88 | Simon Charbonneau | Eighty8 Racing | Chevrolet | 1:24.546 | 104.705 |
| 19 | 84 | Larry Jackson | Larry Jackson Racing | Dodge | 1:24.980 | 104.170 |
| 20 | 54 | Dave Coursol | Coursol Performance | Dodge | 1:25.039 | 104.098 |
| 21 | 8 | Dexter Stacey | Ed Hakonson Racing | Chevrolet | 1:25.070 | 104.060 |
| 22 | 24 | Josh Hurley (R) | BC Race Cars | Ford | 1:25.482 | 103.559 |
| 23 | 85 | Darryl Timmers | Larry Jackson Racing | Dodge | 1:25.982 | 102.956 |
| 24 | 28 | Brad Ranson (R) | DJK Racing | Chevrolet | 1:26.032 | 102.897 |
| 25 | 48 | Ron Tomlinson (R) | Tomlinson Motorsports | Chevrolet | 1:26.831 | 101.950 |
| 26 | 73 | Sylvain Ouellet (R) | Theetge Motorsport | Chevrolet | 1:27.042 | 101.703 |
| 27 | 0 | Glenn Styres | Glenn Styres Racing | Chevrolet | 1:27.300 | 101.402 |
| 28 | 69 | Domenic Scrivo | MBS Motorsports | Chevrolet | 1:27.329 | 101.370 |
| 29 | 14 | Geoff Johnson | Powersports Garage | Ford | 1:28.664 | 99.842 |
| 30 | 67 | David Thorndyke | Promotive Racing | Chevrolet | 1:30.020 | 98.338 |
| 31 | 93 | Jacques Guenette Sr. | JASS Racing with XEMIS Racing | Chevrolet | 1:31.938 | 96.287 |
| 32 | 19 | Keith Bean (R) | BC Race Cars | Chevrolet | – | – |

== Race results ==
| Pos | St | # | Driver | Team | Manufacturer | Laps | Led | Status | Points |
|---|---|---|---|---|---|---|---|---|---|
| 1 | 1 | 71 | Gary Klutt | Legendary Motorcar Company | Dodge | 58 | 19 | Running | 48 |
| 2 | 12 | 47 | L. P. Dumoulin | Dumoulin Compétition | Dodge | 58 | 4 | Running | 43 |
| 3 | 3 | 22 | Kyle Steckly | MBS Motorsports | Chevrolet | 58 | 6 | Running | 42 |
| 4 | 11 | 39 | Alex Guenette | JASS Racing with XEMIS Racing | Chevrolet | 58 | 0 | Running | 40 |
| 5 | 15 | 42 | Ryan Klutt | Legendary Motorcar Company | Dodge | 58 | 0 | Running | 39 |
| 6 | 16 | 1 | J. P. Bergeron | Prolon Racing | Ford | 58 | 0 | Running | 38 |
| 7 | 25 | 85 | Darryl Timmers | Larry Jackson Racing | Dodge | 58 | 0 | Running | 37 |
| 8 | 13 | 3 | Connor Bell (R) | Ed Hakonson Racing | Chevrolet | 58 | 0 | Running | 36 |
| 9 | 8 | 17 | D. J. Kennington | DJK Racing | Dodge | 58 | 0 | Running | 35 |
| 10 | 2 | 96 | Marc-Antoine Camirand | Paillé Course//Racing | Chevrolet | 58 | 17 | Running | 35 |
| 11 | 20 | 54 | Dave Coursol | Coursol Performance | Dodge | 58 | 0 | Running | 33 |
| 12 | 18 | 88 | Simon Charbonneau | Eighty8 Racing | Chevrolet | 58 | 0 | Running | 32 |
| 13 | 21 | 8 | Dexter Stacey | Ed Hakonson Racing | Chevrolet | 58 | 0 | Running | 31 |
| 14 | 26 | 48 | Ron Tomlinson (R) | Tomlinson Motorsports | Chevrolet | 58 | 0 | Running | 30 |
| 15 | 24 | 24 | Josh Hurley (R) | BC Race Cars | Ford | 58 | 9 | Running | 30 |
| 16 | 23 | 69 | Domenic Scrivo | MBS Motorsports | Chevrolet | 58 | 0 | Running | 28 |
| 17 | 9 | 87 | Sam Fellows | Fellows McGraw Racing | Chevrolet | 58 | 0 | Running | 27 |
| 18 | 7 | 45 | Will Larue (R) | Larue Motorsport | Chevrolet | 58 | 2 | Running | 27 |
| 19 | 6 | 27 | Andrew Ranger | Innovation Auto Sport | Chevrolet | 57 | 1 | Running | 26 |
| 20 | 17 | 9 | Mathieu Kingsbury | Innovation Auto Sport | Chevrolet | 57 | 0 | Running | 24 |
| 21 | 31 | 93 | Jacques Guenette Sr. | JASS Racing with XEMIS Racing | Chevrolet | 57 | 0 | Running | 23 |
| 22 | 30 | 67 | David Thorndyke | Promotive Racing | Chevrolet | 53 | 0 | Running | 22 |
| 23 | 19 | 84 | Larry Jackson | Larry Jackson Racing | Dodge | 52 | 0 | Running | 21 |
| 24 | 4 | 80 | Alex Tagliani | Theetge Motorsport | Chevrolet | 51 | 0 | Accident | 20 |
| 25 | 28 | 0 | Glenn Styres | Glenn Styres Racing | Chevrolet | 48 | 0 | Running | 19 |
| 26 | 27 | 73 | Sylvain Ouellet (R) | Theetge Motorsport | Chevrolet | 22 | 0 | Mechanical | 18 |
| 27 | 5 | 74 | Kevin Lacroix | Innovation Auto Sport | Chevrolet | 21 | 0 | Accident | 17 |
| 28 | 29 | 14 | Geoff Johnson (R) | Powersports Garage | Ford | 7 | 0 | Transmission | 16 |
| 29 | 14 | 98 | Malcolm Strachan | Jim Bray Autosport | Ford | 7 | 0 | Electrical | 15 |
| 30 | 10 | 38 | Tyler Gonzalez (R) | RGR Motorsports | Ford | 6 | 0 | Engine | 14 |
| 31 | 22 | 28 | Brad Ranson (R) | DJK Racing | Dodge | 4 | 0 | Electrical | 13 |
| 32 | 32 | 19 | Keith Bean (R) | BC Race Cars | Chevrolet | 0 | 0 | Did Not Start | 12 |

== Standings after the race ==
| Pos | Driver | Points |
|---|---|---|
| 1 | Gary Klutt | 48 |
| 2 | L. P. Dumoulin | 43 (–5) |
| 3 | Kyle Steckly | 42 (–6) |
| 4 | Alex Guenette | 40 (–8) |
| 5 | Ryan Klutt | 39 (–9) |
| 6 | J. P. Bergeron | 38 (–10) |
| 7 | Darryl Timmers | 37 (–11) |
| 8 | Connor Bell | 36 (–12) |
| 9 | D. J. Kennington | 35 (–13) |
| 10 | Marc-Antoine Camirand | 35 (–13) |

| Previous race: 2025 XPN 250 | NASCAR Canada Series; 2026 season | Next race: 2026 Bud Light 125 |
