= 2025 Calabogie 150 =

5th race of the 2025 NASCAR Canada Series

2025 Calabogie 150 Clash of the Titans presented by NAPA and Mack Mackenzie Motors
Race details
- Race 5 of 12 in the 2025 NASCAR Canada Series season
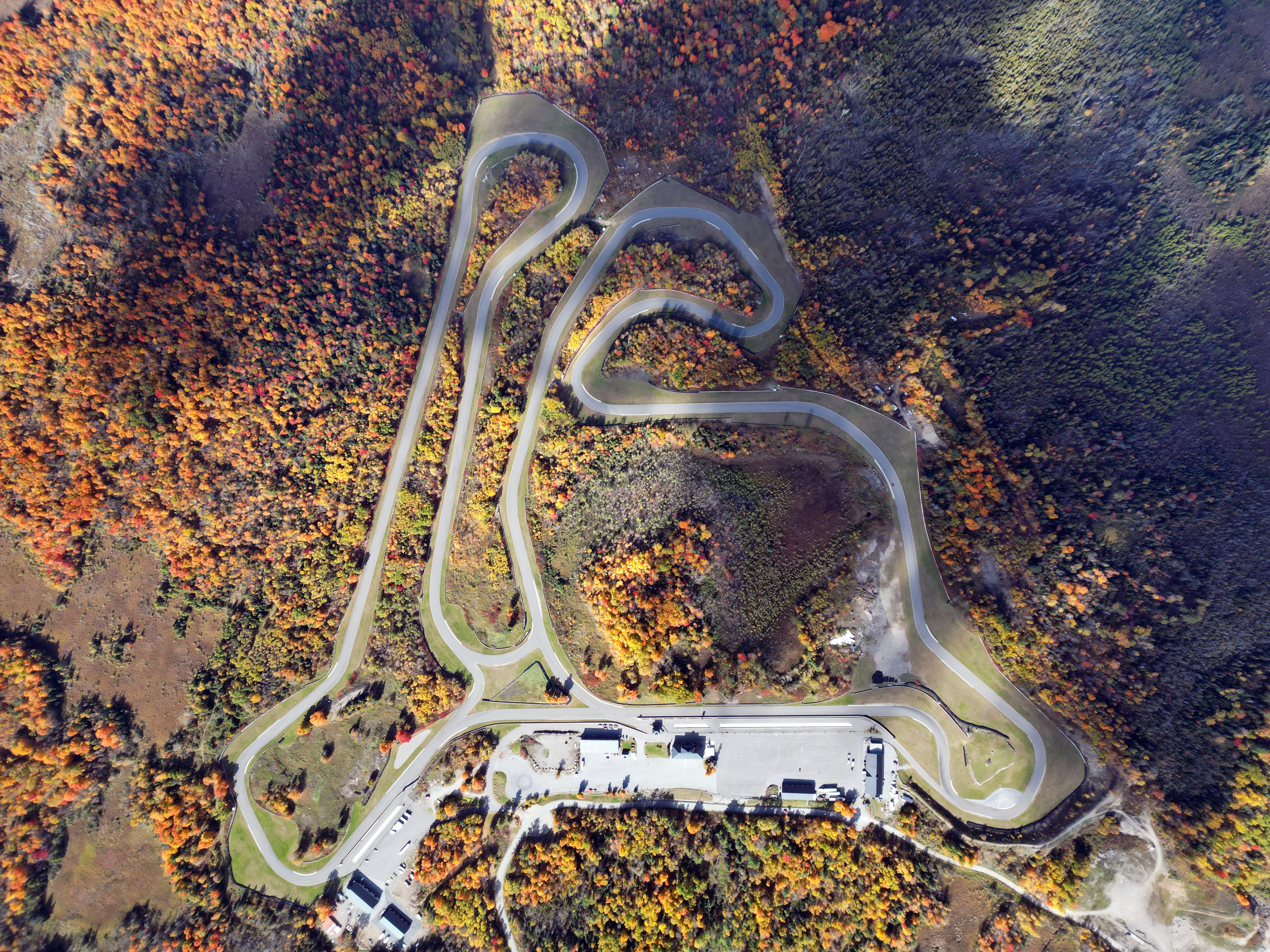
- Date: July 27, 2025
- Location: Calabogie Motorsports Park in Calabogie, Ontario, Canada
- Course: Permanent racing facility
- Course length: 3.138 miles (5.050 km)
- Distance: 50 laps, 156.9 mi (252.5 km)
- Average speed: 61.194 miles per hour (98.482 km/h)

Pole position
Driver	Gary Klutt	Legendary Motorcar Company
- Time: 1:12.092

Most laps led
Driver	Marc-Antoine Camirand	Paillé Course//Racing
- Laps: 23

Winner
No. 3	Connor Bell	Ed Hakonson Racing

The 2025 Calabogie 150 Clash of the Titans presented by NAPA and Mack Mackenzie Motors was the fifth stock car race of the 2025 NASCAR Canada Series. The race was held on Sunday, July 27, 2025, at Calabogie Motorsports Park, a 3.138 mi (5.050 km) road course in Calabogie, Ontario, Canada. The race took the scheduled 50 laps to complete. The race was won by Connor Bell, who was making his series debut and was the youngest driver competing in the event. Alex Guenette would finish the race in second, and L. P. Dumoulin would round out the podium in third.

== Report ==
=== Background ===
Calabogie Motorsports Park is the longest road course in Canada, at 5.050 km (3.138 mi), located 4-kilometre (2.5 mi) east of the community of Calabogie in the township of Greater Madawaska, Ontario, Canada. It hosts regional road racing and is the main circuit in the Ottawa metropolitan area.

==== Entry list ====
- (R) denotes rookie driver.
- (i) denotes driver who is ineligible for series driver points.

#	Driver	Team	Make
00	Todd Musker (R)	Powersports Garage	Chevrolet
1	J. P. Bergeron	Prolon Racing	Ford
3	Connor Bell (R)	Ed Hakonson Racing	Chevrolet
9	Mathieu Kingsbury	Innovation Auto Sport	Chevrolet
14	Geoff Johnson (R)	Powersports Garage	Dodge
17	D. J. Kennington	DJK Racing	Dodge
24	Jeff Cavanagh (R)	Thomas Cavanagh	Ford
27	Andrew Ranger	Paillé Course//Racing	Chevrolet
28	Ryan Vargas	DJK Racing	Dodge
39	Alex Guenette	JASS Racing	Chevrolet
47	L. P. Dumoulin	Dumoulin Compétition	Dodge
48	Ron Tomlinson (R)	Ronald Tomlinson	Chevrolet
59	Gary Klutt	Legendary Motorcar Company	Dodge
69	Domenic Scrivo (R)	MBS Motorsports	Chevrolet
74	Kevin Lacroix	Innovation Auto Sport	Chevrolet
75	Benoit Couture (R)	United Auto Racing	Dodge
80	Alex Tagliani	Group Theetge	Dodge
81	Brent Wheller	Brent Wheller Motorsports	Dodge
84	Larry Jackson	Larry Jackson Racing	Dodge
87	Sam Fellows	Fellows McGraw Racing	Chevrolet
88	Simon Charbonneau (R)	Eighty8 Racing	Chevrolet
93	Jacques Guenette Sr. (R)	JASS Racing	Chevrolet
96	Marc-Antoine Camirand	Paillé Course//Racing	Chevrolet
98	Malcolm Strachan	Jim Bray Autosport	Ford

== Practice ==
The first of two practice sessions was held on Saturday, July 26, at 1:00 PM EST. Marc-Antoine Camirand would set the fastest time in the session, with a lap of 1:13.641 and a speed of 85.159 mph (137.050 km/h).

Pos.	#	Driver	Team	Make	Time	Speed
1	96	Marc-Antoine Camirand	Paillé Course//Racing	Chevrolet	1:13.641	85.159
2	39	Alex Guenette	JASS Racing	Chevrolet	1:13.878	84.886
3	27	Andrew Ranger	Paillé Course//Racing	Chevrolet	1:14.116	84.613
Full practice results

The second and final practice session was held on Saturday, July 26, at 3:04 PM EST. Connor Bell would set the fastest time in the session, with a lap of 1:13.354 and a speed of 85.492 mph (137.586 km/h), 0.004 seconds ahead of Marc-Antoine Camirand.

Pos.	#	Driver	Team	Make	Time	Speed
1	3	Connor Bell	Ed Hakonson Racing	Chevrolet	1:13.354	85.492
2	96	Marc-Antoine Camirand	Paillé Course//Racing	Chevrolet	1:13.358	85.488
3	80	Alex Tagliani	Group Theetge	Dodge	1:13.578	85.232
Full practice results

== Qualifying ==
Qualifying was held on Saturday, July 26, at 6:00 PM EST. Gary Klutt, driving for Legendary Motorcar Company, would win the pole with a lap of 1:12.092 and a speed of 86.989 mph (139.996 km/h).

Pos.	#	Driver	Team	Make	Time	Speed
1	59	Gary Klutt	Legendary Motorcar Company	Dodge	1:12.092	86.989
2	27	Andrew Ranger	Paillé Course//Racing	Chevrolet	1:12.134	96.938
3	96	Marc-Antoine Camirand	Paillé Course//Racing	Chevrolet	1:12.307	86.730
4	80	Alex Tagliani	Group Theetge	Dodge	1:12.421	86.594
5	3	Connor Bell (R)	Ed Hakonson Racing	Chevrolet	1:12.440	86.571
6	39	Alex Guenette	JASS Racing	Chevrolet	1:12.861	86.071
7	87	Sam Fellows	Fellows McGraw Racing	Chevrolet	1:12.981	85.929
8	28	Ryan Vargas	DJK Racing	Dodge	1:13.015	85.889
9	98	Malcolm Strachan	Jim Bray Autosport	Ford	1:13.245	85.619
10	88	Simon Charbonneau (R)	Eighty8 Racing	Chevrolet	1:13.255	85.608
11	17	D. J. Kennington	DJK Racing	Dodge	1:13.279	85.580
12	9	Mathieu Kingsbury	Innovation Auto Sport	Chevrolet	1:13.500	85.322
13	47	L. P. Dumoulin	Dumoulin Compétition	Dodge	1:13.581	85.229
14	1	J. P. Bergeron	Prolon Racing	Ford	1:13.613	85.191
15	48	Ron Tomlinson (R)	Ron Tomlinson	Chevrolet	1:13.715	85.074
16	24	Jeff Cavanagh (R)	Thomas Cavanagh	Ford	1:14.287	84.419
17	14	Geoff Johnson (R)	Powersports Garage	Dodge	1:14.785	83.856
18	00	Todd Musker (R)	Powersports Garage	Chevrolet	1:15.363	83.213
19	84	Larry Jackson	Larry Jackson Racing	Dodge	1:16.249	82.246
20	69	Domenic Scrivo (R)	MBS Motorsports	Chevrolet	1:16.294	82.198
21	93	Jacques Guenette Sr. (R)	JASS Racing	Chevrolet	1:17.679	80.732
22	81	Brent Wheller	Brent Wheller Motorsports	Dodge	1:18.998	79.384
23	75	Benoit Couture (R)	United Auto Racing	Dodge	1:19.964	78.425
24	74	Kevin Lacroix	Innovation Auto Sport	Chevrolet	–	–

== Race results ==
Pos	St	#	Driver	Team	Manufacturer	Laps	Led	Status	Points
1	5	3	Connor Bell (R)	Ed Hakonson Racing	Chevrolet	50	6	Running	47
2	6	39	Alex Guenette	JASS Racing	Chevrolet	50	10	Running	43
3	13	47	L.P. Dumoulin	Dumoulin Compétition	Dodge	50	0	Running	41
4	3	96	Marc-Antoine Camirand	Paillé Course//Racing	Chevrolet	50	23	Running	42
5	2	27	Andrew Ranger	Paillé Course//Racing	Chevrolet	50	2	Running	40
6	4	80	Alex Tagliani	Group Theetge	Dodge	50	4	Running	39
7	12	9	Mathieu Kingsbury	Innovation Auto Sport	Chevrolet	50	0	Running	37
8	11	17	D.J. Kennington	DJK Racing	Dodge	50	0	Running	36
9	22	69	Domenic Scrivo (R)	MBS Motorsports	Chevrolet	50	0	Running	35
10	18	00	Todd Musker (R)	Powersports Garage	Chevrolet	50	0	Running	34
11	7	87	Sam Fellows	Fellows McGraw Racing	Chevrolet	50	0	Running	33
12	15	48	Ron Tomlinson (R)	Ron Tomlinson	Chevrolet	50	0	Running	32
13	24	75	Benoit Couture (R)	United Auto Racing	Dodge	50	0	Running	31
14	10	88	Simon Charbonneau (R)	Eighty8 Racing	Chevrolet	50	0	Running	30
15	14	1	J.P. Bergeron	Prolon Racing	Ford	49	0	Accident	29
16	1	59	Gary Klutt	Legendary Motorcar Company	Dodge	49	4	Running	29
17	19	84	Jarry Jackson	Larry Jackson Racing	Dodge	48	0	Running	27
18	23	93	Jacques Guenette Sr. (R)	JASS Racing	Chevrolet	48	0	Running	26
19	16	24	Jeff Cavanagh (R)	Thomas Cavanagh	Ford	44	0	Electrical	25
20	9	98	Malcolm Strachan	Jim Bray Autosport	Ford	44	0	Suspension	24
21	21	81	Brent Wheller	Brent Wheller Motorsports	Dodge	44	1	Mechanical	24
22	9	28	Ryan Vargas	DJK Racing	Dodge	11	0	Transmission	22
23	17	14	Geoff Johnson (R)	Powersports Garage	Dodge	8	0	Engine	21
24	20	74	Kevin Lacroix	Innovation Auto Sport	Chevrolet	0	0	Engine	20

== Standings after the race ==
	Pos	Driver	Points
	1	Marc-Antoine Camirand	208
1	2	D. J. Kennington	199 (–9)
1	3	Andrew Ranger	194 (–14)
2	4	L. P. Dumoulin	191 (–17)
3	5	Kevin Lacroix	185 (–23)
2	6	Mathieu Kingsbury	179 (–29)
2	7	Ryan Vargas	173 (–35)
1	8	Jason Hathaway	149 (–59)
	9	Donald Theetge	109 (–99)
1	10	Larry Jackson	84 (–124)

Previous race: 2025 Leland Industries 250	NASCAR Canada Series; 2025 season	Next race: 2025 Bud Light 250
