= 2025 XPN 250 =

12th race of the 2025 NASCAR Canada Series

Race details
- Race 12 of 12 in the 2025 NASCAR Canada Series season
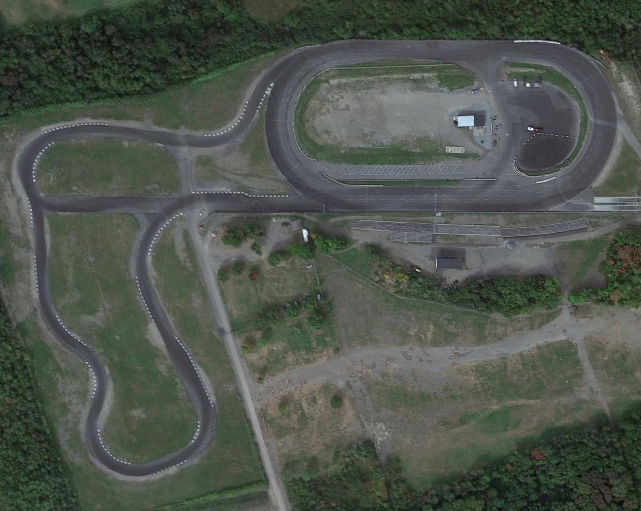
- Date: September 21, 2025
- Location: Autodrome Montmagny in Montmagny, Quebec, Canada
- Course: Oval
- Course length: 0.375 miles (0.604 km)
- Distance: 250 laps, 93.75 mi (151 km)
- Average speed: 64.682 miles per hour (104.096 km/h)

Pole position
Driver	Alex Labbé	LL Motorsports
- Time: 17.436

Most laps led
Driver	Marc-Antoine Camirand	Paillé Course//Racing
- Laps: 182

Winner
No. 96	Marc-Antoine Camirand	Paillé Course//Racing

Television in the United States
- Network: REV TV on YouTube
- Announcers: Dave Bradley and Gary Klutt

The 2025 XPN 250 was the twelfth and final race of the 2025 NASCAR Canada Series. It was held on Sunday, September 21, 2025, on Autodrome Montmagny's 0.375 mi (0.604 km) oval shaped racetrack in Montmagny, Quebec, Canada. Three drivers entered the race with a chance at the title, those being two time and defending champion Marc-Antoine Camirand, two time champion D. J. Kennington, and three time champion Andrew Ranger. Marc-Antoine Camirand would win the race and the title, becoming the first driver in NASCAR Canada Series history to win consecutive championships. Will Larue finished in second and polesitter Alex Labbé rounded out the podium in third.

== Report ==
=== Background ===
The Autodrome Montmagny is a multi-track motorsport venue located in Montmagny (Canada), approximately 80 km (50 mi) east of Quebec City. The facility features a 0.375 mi (0.604 km) oval track, a 2.000 km (1.243 mi) road course and a dragstrip.

==== Entry list ====
- (R) denotes rookie driver.
- (i) denotes driver who is ineligible for series driver points.

#	Driver	Team	Make
0	Glenn Styres	Glenn Styres Racing	Chevrolet
3	Frédérik Ladouceur (R)	Ed Hakonson Racing	Chevrolet
04	Christopher Bedard (R)	Dumoulin Compétition	Dodge
9	Mathieu Kingsbury	Innovation Auto Sport	Chevrolet
17	D. J. Kennington	DJK Racing	Dodge
27	Andrew Ranger	Paillé Course//Racing	Chevrolet
36	Alex Labbé	LL Motorsports	Chevrolet
37	Simon Dion-Viens	SDV Autosport	Dodge
39	Alex Guenette	JASS Racing	Chevrolet
45	Will Larue (R)	Larue Motorsports	Chevrolet
46	Matthew Shirley (R)	DJK Racing	Dodge
47	L. P. Dumoulin	Dumoulin Compétition	Dodge
50	Sam Charland (R)	Dumoulin Compétition	Chevrolet
54	Dave Coursol	Coursol Performance	Chevrolet
69	Domenic Scrivo (R)	MBS Motorsports	Chevrolet
74	Kevin Lacroix	Innovation Auto Sport	Chevrolet
80	Donald Theetge	Group Theetge	Chevrolet
83	Martin Goulet Jr. (R)	Goulet Motorsports	Chevrolet
84	Larry Jackson	Larry Jackson Racing	Dodge
96	Marc-Antoine Camirand	Paillé Course//Racing	Chevrolet
97	Maxime Gauvreau (R)	Equipe de Course	Chevrolet

== Practice ==
Practice was held on September 20 at 12:15 PM EST. Donald Theetge set the fastest time in the session, with a lap of 17.679 seconds and a speed of 76.362 mph (122.893 km/h).

Pos.	#	Driver	Team	Make	Time	Speed
1	80	Donald Theetge	Group Theetge	Chevrolet	17.679	76.362
2	96	Marc-Antoine Camirand	Paillé Course//Racing	Chevrolet	17.753	76.043
3	74	Kevin Lacroix	Innovation Auto Sport	Chevrolet	17.801	75.838
Full practice results

== Qualifying ==
Qualifying was held on September 20 at 3:45 PM EST. Alex Labbé, driving for LL Motorsports, won the pole with a lap of 17.436 seconds and a speed of 77.426 mph (124.605 km/h).

Pos.	#	Driver	Team	Make	Time	Speed
1	36	Alex Labbé	LL Motorsports	Chevrolet	17.436	77.426
2	96	Marc-Antoine Camirand	Paillé Course//Racing	Chevrolet	17.535	76.989
3	80	Donald Theetge	Group Theetge	Chevrolet	17.581	76.787
4	45	Will Larue (R)	Larue Motorsports	Chevrolet	17.645	76.509
5	47	L. P. Dumoulin	Dumoulin Compétition	Dodge	17.662	76.435
6	54	Dave Coursol	Coursol Performance	Chevrolet	17.700	76.271
7	9	Mathieu Kingsbury	Innovation Auto Sport	Chevrolet	17.708	76.237
8	74	Kevin Lacroix	Innovation Auto Sport	Chevrolet	17.717	76.198
9	27	Andrew Ranger	Paillé Course//Racing	Chevrolet	17.737	76.112
10	97	Maxime Gauvreau (R)	Equipe de Course	Chevrolet	17.772	75.962
11	39	Alex Guenette	JASS Racing	Chevrolet	17.783	75.915
12	37	Simon Dion-Viens	SDV Autosport	Dodge	17.797	75.855
13	17	D. J. Kennington	DJK Racing	Dodge	17.829	75.719
14	3	Frédérik Ladouceur (R)	Ed Hakonson Racing	Chevrolet	17.888	75.470
15	04	Christopher Bedard (R)	Dumoulin Compétition	Dodge	17.907	75.390
16	50	Sam Charland (R)	Dumoulin Compétition	Chevrolet	17.935	75.272
17	83	Martin Goulet Jr. (R)	Goulet Motorsports	Chevrolet	17.948	75.217
18	0	Glenn Styres	Glenn Styres Racing	Chevrolet	17.951	75.205
19	46	Matthew Shirley (R)	DJK Racing	Dodge	17.976	75.100
20	84	Larry Jackson	Larry Jackson Racing	Dodge	18.098	74.594
21	69	Domenic Scrivo (R)	MBS Motorsports	Chevrolet	18.209	74.139
Full qualifying results

== Race results ==
Pos	St	#	Driver	Team	Manufacturer	Laps	Led	Status	Points
1	2	96	Marc-Antoine Camirand	Paillé Course//Racing	Chevrolet	250	182	Running	48
2	4	45	Will Larue (R)	Larue Motorsports	Chevrolet	250	0	Running	42
3	1	36	Alex Labbé	LL Motorsports	Chevrolet	250	5	Running	42
4	3	80	Donald Theetge	Group Theetge	Chevrolet	250	63	Running	41
5	13	17	D. J. Kennington	DJK Racing	Dodge	250	0	Running	39
6	9	27	Andrew Ranger	Paillé Course//Racing	Chevrolet	250	0	Running	38
7	7	9	Mathieu Kingsbury	Innovation Auto Sport	Chevrolet	250	0	Running	37
8	11	39	Alex Guenette	JASS Racing	Chevrolet	250	0	Running	36
9	8	74	Kevin Lacroix	Innovation Auto Sport	Chevrolet	250	0	Running	35
10	6	54	Dave Coursol	Coursol Performance	Chevrolet	249	0	Running	34
11	20	84	Larry Jackson	Larry Jackson Racing	Dodge	248	0	Running	33
12	14	3	Frédérik Ladouceur (R)	Ed Hakonson Racing	Chevrolet	248	0	Running	32
13	5	47	L. P. Dumoulin	Dumoulin Compétition	Dodge	248	0	Running	31
14	15	04	Christopher Bedard (R)	Dumoulin Compétition	Dodge	248	0	Running	30
15	18	0	Glenn Styres	Glenn Styres Racing	Chevrolet	246	0	Running	29
16	16	50	Sam Charland (R)	Dumoulin Compétition	Chevrolet	246	0	Running	28
17	17	83	Martin Goulet Jr. (R)	Goulet Motorsports	Chevrolet	246	0	Running	27
18	12	37	Simon Dion-Viens	SDV Autosport	Dodge	245	0	Running	26
19	21	69	Domenic Scrivo (R)	MBS Motorsports	Chevrolet	243	0	Running	25
20	19	46	Matthew Shirley (R)	DJK Racing	Dodge	191	0	Electrical	24
21	10	97	Maxime Gauvreau (R)	Equipe de Course	Chevrolet	143	0	Engine	23

== Standings after the race ==
	Pos	Driver	Points
	1	Marc-Antoine Camirand	499
	2	D. J. Kennington	476 (–23)
	3	Andrew Ranger	470 (–29)
	4	Kevin Lacroix	438 (–61)
	5	L. P. Dumoulin	422 (–77)
	6	Mathieu Kingsbury	419 (–80)
1	7	Donald Theetge	305 (–194)
1	8	Ryan Vargas	303 (–196)
	9	Larry Jackson	283 (–216)
	10	Alex Guenette	259 (–240)

Previous race: 2025 NTN 125	NASCAR Canada Series; 2025 season	Next race: 2026 CarGurus 200
