= 2025 NAPA 300 =

3rd race of the 2025 NASCAR Canada Series

Race details
- Race 3 of 12 in the 2025 NASCAR Canada Series season
- Location: Edmonton International Raceway in County of Wetaskiwin No. 10, Alberta, Canada
- Course: Permanent racing facility
- Course length: 0.250 miles (0.402 km)
- Distance: 310 laps, 77.50 mi (124.72 km)
- Scheduled distance: 300 laps, 75.0 mi (120.70 km)
- Average speed: 54.439 miles per hour (87.611 km/h)

Pole position
Driver	Donald Theetge	Group Theetge
- Time: 12.924

Most laps led
Driver	Donald Theetge	Group Theetge
- Laps: 108

Winner
No. 96	Marc-Antoine Camirand	Paillé Course//Racing

The 2025 NAPA 300 was the third stock car race of the 2025 NASCAR Canada Series. The race was held on Saturday, July 12, 2025, at Edmonton International Raceway, a 0.250 mi (0.402 km) oval shaped racetrack outside Wetaskiwin, Alberta, Canada, approximately 50 kilometres (31 mi) south of Edmonton. The race went beyond the scheduled 300 lap distance after a late race caution and would be completed after 310 laps. The race was won by Marc-Antoine Camirand, driving for Paillé Course//Racing, his second win of the season. Donald Theetge, driving for Group Theetge, led the most laps and finished in second, and Kevin Lacroix, driving for Innovation Auto Sport, would finish third.

== Report ==
=== Background ===
Edmonton International Raceway is a 0.250 mi (0.402 km), paved oval auto racing facility, located outside Wetaskiwin, Alberta, Canada, approximately 50 kilometres (31 mi) south of Edmonton. The track is the first in Alberta to be sanctioned by NASCAR.

==== Entry list ====
- (R) denotes rookie driver.
- (i) denotes driver who is ineligible for series driver points.

#	Driver	Team	Make
3	Jason Hathaway	Ed Hakonson Racing	Chevrolet
04	Bryan Cathcart	Dumoulin Compétition	Dodge
9	Mathieu Kingsbury	Innovation Auto Sport	Chevrolet
10	Rob Naismith	MRN Racing	Chevrolet
17	D. J. Kennington	DJK Racing	Dodge
27	Andrew Ranger	Paillé Course//Racing	Chevrolet
28	Ryan Vargas	DJK Racing	Dodge
46	Matthew Shirley (R)	DJK Racing	Dodge
47	L. P. Dumoulin	Dumoulin Compétition	Dodge
74	Kevin Lacroix	Innovation Auto Sport	Chevrolet
80	Donald Theetge	Group Theetge	Chevrolet
96	Marc-Antoine Camirand	Paillé Course//Racing	Chevrolet

== Practice ==
The first and only practice session took place on Saturday, July 12, at 12:35 PM MT. Donald Theetge would set the fastest time in the session, with a lap of 13.005 seconds with a speed of 69.204 mph (111.373 km/h).

Pos.	#	Driver	Team	Make	Time	Speed
1	80	Donald Theetge	Group Theetge	Chevrolet	13.005	69.204
2	27	Andrew Ranger	Paillé Course//Racing	Chevrolet	13.051	68.960
3	74	Kevin Lacroix	Innovation Auto Sport	Chevrolet	13.113	68.634
Full practice results

== Qualifying ==
Qualifying was held on Saturday, July 12, at 4:50 PM MT. Donald Theetge, driving for Group Theetge, would win the pole with a lap of 12.924 seconds and a speed of 69.638 mph (112.071 km/h).

Pos.	#	Driver	Team	Make	Time	Speed
1	80	Donald Theetge	Group Theetge	Chevrolet	12.924	69.638
2	27	Andrew Ranger	Paillé Course//Racing	Chevrolet	12.928	69.616
3	9	Mathieu Kingsbury	Innovation Auto Sport	Chevrolet	12.978	69.348
4	74	Kevin Lacroix	Innovation Auto Sport	Chevrolet	12.997	69.247
5	28	Ryan Vargas	DJK Racing	Dodge	13.009	69.183
6	47	L. P. Dumoulin	Dumoulin Compétition	Dodge	13.015	69.151
7	17	D. J. Kennington	DJK Racing	Dodge	13.023	69.109
8	3	Jason Hathaway	Ed Hakonson Racing	Chevrolet	13.041	69.013
9	96	Marc-Antoine Camirand	Paillé Course//Racing	Chevrolet	13.066	68.881
10	46	Matthew Shirley	DJK Racing	Dodge	13.139	68.498
Withdrew
11	04	Bryan Cathcart	Dumoulin Compétition	Dodge	–	–
12	10	Rob Naismith	MRN Racing	Chevrolet	–	–
Full qualifying results

== Race results ==
Pos	St	#	Driver	Team	Manufacturer	Laps	Led	Status	Points
1	9	96	Marc-Antoine Camirand	Paillé Course//Racing	Chevrolet	310	71	Running	47
2	1	80	Donald Theetge	Group Theetge	Dodge	310	108	Running	44
3	4	74	Kevin Lacroix	Innovation Auto Sport	Chevrolet	310	50	Running	42
4	2	27	Andrew Ranger	Paillé Course//Racing	Chevrolet	310	0	Running	40
5	7	17	D. J. Kennington	DJK Racing	Dodge	310	81	Running	40
6	5	28	Ryan Vargas	DJK Racing	Dodge	310	0	Running	38
7	3	9	Mathieu Kingsbury	Innovation Auto Sport	Chevrolet	310	0	Running	37
8	8	3	Jason Hathway	Ed Hakonson Racing	Chevrolet	309	0	Running	36
9	10	46	Matthew Shirley	DJK Racing	Dodge	307	0	Running	35
10	6	47	L. P. Dumoulin	Dumoulin Compétition	Dodge	201	0	Vibration	34

== Standings after the race ==
	Pos	Driver	Points
1	1	Marc-Antoine Camirand	125
1	2	D. J. Kennington	125 (–0)
	3	Andrew Ranger	118 (–7)
1	4	Kevin Lacroix	117 (–8)
1	5	Ryan Vargas	112 (–13)
2	6	L. P. Dumoulin	109 (–16)
	7	Jason Hathaway	106 (–19)
	8	Mathieu Kingsbury	105 (–20)
12	9	Donald Theetge	74 (–51)
1	10	Larry Jackson	57 (–68)

Previous race: 2025 NASCAR Canada 300	NASCAR Canada Series; 2025 season	Next race: 2025 Leland Industries 250
