= 2025 Clarington 200 =

1st race of the 2025 NASCAR Canada Series

Race details
- Race 1 of 12 in the 2025 NASCAR Canada Series season
- Date: May 18, 2025
- Location: Canadian Tire Motorsport Park in Clarington, Ontario, Canada
- Course: 10-turn road course
- Course length: 2.459 miles (3.957 km)
- Distance: 51 laps, 125.41 mi (201.81 km)
- Average speed: 107.610 miles per hour (173.182 km/h)

Pole position
| Driver | Kyle Steckly | MBS Motorsports |
- Time: 1:22.456

Most laps led
| Driver | Malcolm Strachan | Jim Bray Autosport |
- Laps: 25

Winner
| No. 96 | Marc-Antoine Camirand | Paillé Course//Racing |

Television in the United States
- Network: REV TV on YouTube
- Announcers: Dave Bradley and Treyten Lapcevich

The 2025 Clarington 200 was the first stock car race of the 2025 NASCAR Canada Series. The race was held on Sunday, May 18, 2025, at Canadian Tire Motorsport Park, a 2.459 mi (3.957 km) road course in Clarington, Ontario, Canada. The race took the scheduled 51 laps to complete. The race was won by Marc-Antoine Camirand, driving for Paillé Course//Racing, after he made a last lap move on Gary Klutt. Klutt, driving for Legendary Motorcar Company, would hang on to finish second, and Malcolm Strachan, driving for Jim Bray Autosport, would round out the podium in third.

== Report ==
=== Background ===
Canadian Tire Motorsport Park is a multi-track motorsport venue located north of Bowmanville in Clarington, Ontario, Canada, approximately 75 kilometres (47 miles) east of Toronto. The facility features a 3.957 km (2.459 mi), 10-turn road course; a 2.9 km (1.8 mi) advance driver and race driver training facility with a 0.402 km (0.250 mi) skid pad (Driver Development Centre) and a 1.5 km (0.93 mi) kart track.

==== Entry list ====
- (R) denotes rookie driver.
- (i) denotes driver who is ineligible for series driver points.

| # | Driver | Team | Make |
|---|---|---|---|
| 0 | Glenn Styres | Glenn Styres Racing | Chevrolet |
| 1 | J. P. Bergeron | Prolon Racing | Ford |
| 3 | Jason Hathaway | Ed Hakonson Racing | Chevrolet |
| 6 | Peter Klutt | Legendary Motorcar Company | Dodge |
| 8 | Danny Chisholm (R) | Ed Hakonson Racing | Chevrolet |
| 9 | Mathieu Kingsbury | Innovation Auto Sport | Chevrolet |
| 17 | D. J. Kennington | DJK Racing | Dodge |
| 22 | Kyle Steckly | MBS Motorsports | Chevrolet |
| 24 | Josh Hurley (R) | BC Race Cars | Ford |
| 27 | Andrew Ranger | Paillé Course//Racing | Chevrolet |
| 28 | Ryan Vargas (R) | DJK Racing | Dodge |
| 39 | Alex Guenette | JASS Racing | Chevrolet |
| 42 | Ryan Klutt | Legendary Motorcar Company | Chevrolet |
| 47 | L. P. Dumoulin | Dumoulin Compétition | Dodge |
| 54 | Dave Coursol | Coursol Performance | Dodge |
| 59 | Gary Klutt | Legendary Motorcar Company | Dodge |
| 67 | David Thorndyke | Promotive Racing | Chevrolet |
| 69 | Domenic Scrivo (R) | MBS Motorsports | Chevrolet |
| 74 | Kevin Lacroix | Innovation Auto Sport | Chevrolet |
| 80 | Alex Tagliani | Group Theetge | Chevrolet |
| 81 | Brent Wheller | Jim Bray Autosport | Ford |
| 84 | Darryl Timmers (R) | Larry Jackson Racing | Dodge |
| 85 | Larry Jackson | Larry Jackson Racing | Dodge |
| 87 | Sam Fellows | Fellows McGraw Racing | Chevrolet |
| 88 | Simon Charbonneau (R) | Eighty8 Racing | Chevrolet |
| 96 | Marc-Antoine Camirand | Paillé Course//Racing | Chevrolet |
| 98 | Malcolm Strachan | Jim Bray Autosport | Ford |
| 99 | Matthew Scannell | Larry Jackson Racing | Dodge |

== Practice ==
The first and only practice session took place on Saturday, May 17, at 12:55 PM EST. Marc-Antoine Camirand would set the fastest time in the session, with a lap of 1:22.442 and a speed of 107.377 mph (172.807 km/h).

| Pos. | # | Driver | Team | Make | Time | Speed |
|---|---|---|---|---|---|---|
| 1 | 96 | Marc-Antoine Camirand | Paillé Course//Racing | Chevrolet | 1:22.442 | 107.377 |
| 2 | 27 | Andrew Ranger | Paillé Course//Racing | Chevrolet | 1:22.545 | 107.243 |
| 3 | 74 | Kevin Lacroix | Innovation Auto Sport | Chevrolet | 1:22.729 | 107.005 |
Full practice results

== Qualifying ==
Qualifying was held on Saturday, May 17, at 4:55 PM EST. Kyle Steckly, driving for MBS Motorsports, would win the pole, with a lap of 1:22.264 and a speed of 107.610 mph (173.182 km/h).

=== Qualifying results ===
| Pos. | # | Driver | Team | Make | Time | Speed |
|---|---|---|---|---|---|---|
| 1 | 22 | Kyle Steckly | MBS Motorsports | Chevrolet | 1:22.264 | 107.610 |
| 2 | 74 | Kevin Lacroix | Innovation Auto Sport | Chevrolet | 1:22.377 | 107.462 |
| 3 | 80 | Alex Tagliani | Group Theetge | Chevrolet | 1:22.456 | 107.359 |
| 4 | 96 | Marc-Antoine Camirand | Paillé Course//Racing | Chevrolet | 1:22.660 | 107.094 |
| 5 | 39 | Alex Guenette | JASS Racing | Chevrolet | 1:22.710 | 107.029 |
| 6 | 59 | Gary Klutt | Legendary Motorcar Company | Dodge | 1:22.765 | 106.958 |
| 7 | 3 | Jason Hathaway | Ed Hakonson Racing | Chevrolet | 1:22.770 | 106.952 |
| 8 | 27 | Andrew Ranger | Paillé Course//Racing | Chevrolet | 1:22.796 | 106.918 |
| 9 | 87 | Sam Fellows | Fellows McGraw Racing | Chevrolet | 1:22.796 | 106.918 |
| 10 | 6 | Peter Klutt | Legendary Motorcar Company | Dodge | 1:23.363 | 106.191 |
| 11 | 98 | Malcolm Strachan | Jim Bray Autosport | Ford | 1:23.402 | 106.141 |
| 12 | 24 | Josh Hurley (R) | BC Race Cars | Ford | 1:23.487 | 106.033 |
| 13 | 47 | L. P. Dumoulin | Dumoulin Compétition | Dodge | 1:23.503 | 106.013 |
| 14 | 99 | Matthew Scannell | Larry Jackson Racing | Dodge | 1:23.513 | 106.000 |
| 15 | 42 | Ryan Klutt | Legendary Motorcar Company | Dodge | 1:23.571 | 105.927 |
| 16 | 17 | D. J. Kennington | DJK Racing | Dodge | 1:23.771 | 105.674 |
| 17 | 88 | Simon Charbonneau (R) | Eighty8 Racing | Chevrolet | 1:24.125 | 105.229 |
| 18 | 9 | Mathieu Kingsbury | Innovation Auto Sport | Chevrolet | 1:24.127 | 105.227 |
| 19 | 1 | J. P. Bergeron | Prolon Racing | Ford | 1:24.579 | 104.664 |
| 20 | 28 | Ryan Vargas (R) | DJK Racing | Dodge | 1:24.586 | 104.656 |
| 21 | 84 | Darryl Timmers (R) | Larry Jackson Racing | Dodge | 1:24.801 | 104.390 |
| 22 | 54 | Dave Coursol | Coursol Performance | Dodge | 1:24.925 | 104.238 |
| 23 | 8 | Danny Chisholm (R) | Ed Hakonson Racing | Chevrolet | 1:25.240 | 103.853 |
| 24 | 0 | Glenn Styres | Glenn Styres Racing | Chevrolet | 1:25.645 | 103.362 |
| 25 | 69 | Domenic Scrivo (R) | MBS Motorsports | Chevrolet | 1:26.250 | 102.637 |
| 26 | 67 | David Thorndyke | Promotive Racing | Chevrolet | 1:27.657 | 100.989 |
| 27 | 85 | Larry Jackson | Larry Jackson Racing | Dodge | 1:28.420 | 100.119 |
| 28 | 81 | Brent Wheller | Jim Bray Autosport | Ford | 1:29.078 | 99.378 |
Full qualifying results

== Race results ==
| Pos | St | # | Driver | Team | Manufacturer | Laps | Led | Status | Points |
|---|---|---|---|---|---|---|---|---|---|
| 1 | 4 | 96 | Marc-Antoine Camirand | Paillé Course//Racing | Chevrolet | 51 | 1 | Running | 47 |
| 2 | 6 | 59 | Gary Klutt | Legendary Motorcar Company | Dodge | 51 | 6 | Running | 43 |
| 3 | 11 | 98 | Malcom Strachan | Jim Bray Autosport | Ford | 51 | 25 | Running | 43 |
| 4 | 5 | 39 | Alex Guenette | JASS Racing | Chevrolet | 51 | 0 | Running | 40 |
| 5 | 13 | 47 | L. P. Dumoulin | Dumoulin Compétition | Dodge | 51 | 0 | Running | 39 |
| 6 | 8 | 27 | Andrew Ranger | Paillé Course//Racing | Chevrolet | 51 | 0 | Running | 38 |
| 7 | 16 | 17 | D. J. Kennington | DJK Racing | Dodge | 51 | 0 | Running | 37 |
| 8 | 2 | 74 | Kevin Lacroix | Innovation Auto Sport | Chevrolet | 51 | 0 | Running | 36 |
| 9 | 7 | 3 | Jason Hathaway | Ed Hakonson Racing | Chevrolet | 51 | 0 | Running | 35 |
| 10 | 23 | 8 | Danny Chisholm (R) | Ed Hakonson Racing | Chevrolet | 51 | 0 | Running | 34 |
| 11 | 12 | 24 | Josh Hurley (R) | BC Race Cars | Ford | 51 | 0 | Running | 33 |
| 12 | 20 | 28 | Ryan Vargas (R) | DJK Racing | Dodge | 51 | 4 | Running | 33 |
| 13 | 21 | 84 | Darryl Timmers (R) | Larry Jackson Racing | Dodge | 51 | 0 | Running | 31 |
| 14 | 22 | 54 | Dave Coursol | Coursol Performance | Dodge | 51 | 0 | Running | 30 |
| 15 | 18 | 9 | Mathieu Kingsbury | Innovation Auto Sport | Chevrolet | 51 | 0 | Running | 29 |
| 16 | 17 | 88 | Simon Charbonneau (R) | Eighty8 Racing | Chevrolet | 51 | 0 | Running | 28 |
| 17 | 24 | 0 | Glenn Styres | Glenn Styres Racing | Chevrolet | 50 | 0 | Running | 27 |
| 18 | 3 | 80 | Alex Tagliani | Group Theetge | Chevrolet | 49 | 15 | Running | 27 |
| 19 | 15 | 42 | Ryan Klutt | Legendary Motorcar Company | Dodge | 46 | 0 | Running | 25 |
| 20 | 9 | 87 | Sam Fellows | Fellows McGraw Racing | Chevrolet | 42 | 0 | Running | 24 |
| 21 | 27 | 85 | Larry Jackson | Larry Jackson Racing | Dodge | 41 | 0 | Transmission | 23 |
| 22 | 28 | 81 | Brent Wheller | Jim Bray Autosport | Ford | 39 | 0 | Running | 22 |
| 23 | 26 | 67 | David Thorndyke | Promotive Racing | Chevrolet | 34 | 0 | Engine | 21 |
| 24 | 10 | 6 | Peter Klutt | Legendary Motorcar Company | Dodge | 28 | 0 | Accident | 20 |
| 25 | 25 | 69 | Domenic Scrivo (R) | MBS Motorsports | Chevrolet | 17 | 0 | Accident | 19 |
| 26 | 19 | 1 | J. P. Bergeron | Prolon Racing | Ford | 16 | 0 | Power Steering | 18 |
| 27 | 1 | 22 | Kyle Steckly | MBS Motorsports | Chevrolet | 13 | 0 | Engine | 17 |
| 28 | 14 | 99 | Matthew Scannell | Larry Jackson Racing | Dodge | 4 | 0 | Clutch | 16 |

== Standings after the race ==
| Pos | Driver | Points |
|---|---|---|
| 1 | Marc-Antoine Camirand | 47 |
| 2 | Gary Klutt | 43 (–4) |
| 3 | Malcom Strachan | 43 (–4) |
| 4 | Alex Guenette | 40 (–7) |
| 5 | L. P. Dumoulin | 39 (–8) |
| 6 | Andrew Ranger | 38 (–9) |
| 7 | D. J. Kennington | 37 (–10) |
| 8 | Kevin Lacroix | 36 (–11) |
| 9 | Jason Hathaway | 35 (–12) |
| 10 | Danny Chisholm | 34 (–13) |

| Previous race: 2024 XPN 250 | NASCAR Canada Series; 2025 season | Next race: 2025 NASCAR Canada 300 |
