= 2025 Evirum 100 =

8th race of the 2025 NASCAR Canada Series

Race details
- Race 8 of 12 in the 2025 NASCAR Canada Series season
- Date: August 23, 2025
- Location: Circuit ICAR in Mirabel, Quebec, Canada
- Course: Permanent racing facility
- Course length: 1.426 miles (2.295 km)
- Distance: 43 laps, 61.318 mi (98.685 km)

Pole position
Driver	Andrew Ranger	Paillé Course//Racing
- Time: 1:02.854

Most laps led
Driver	Marc-Antoine Camirand	Paillé Course//Racing
- Laps: 31

Winner
No. 96	Marc-Antoine Camirand	Paillé Course//Racing

The 2025 Evirum 100 was the eighth stock car race of the 2025 NASCAR Canada Series. It was held on Saturday, August 23, 2025, at Circuit ICAR in Mirabel, Quebec, Canada. The race took place on the 1.426 mi (2.295 km) road course layout. Marc-Antoine Camirand won the race, with polesitter Andrew Ranger finishing in second and Alex Tagliani rounding out the podium in third.

== Report ==
=== Background ===
The International Center of Advanced Racing (Circuit ICAR) is a multi-track facility located on the former runways at Montréal–Mirabel International Airport, in Mirabel, Quebec, Canada north of Montreal. The facility features a 2.125 mi (3.420 km), 16-turn road course, a 0.400 mi (0.644 km) oval, a 0.250 mi (0.402 km) drag strip, two kart tracks, a driftpark and an offroad course.

==== Entry list ====
- (R) denotes rookie driver
- (i) denotes driver who is ineligible for series driver points.

#	Driver	Team	Make
1	J. P. Bergeron	Prolon Racing	Ford
3	Justin Arseneau (R)	Ed Hakonson Racing	Chevrolet
04	Jean-François Dumoulin	Dumoulin Compétition	Dodge
9	Mathieu Kingsbury	Innovation Auto Sport	Chevrolet
17	D. J. Kennington	DJK Racing	Dodge
27	Andrew Ranger	Paillé Course//Racing	Chevrolet
36	Alex Labbé	LL Motorsports	Chevrolet
37	Simon Dion-Viens	SDV Autosport	Dodge
39	Alex Guenette	JASS Racing	Chevrolet
47	L. P. Dumoulin	Dumoulin Compétition	Dodge
54	Dave Coursol	Coursol Performance	Chevrolet
55	Serge Bourdeau	Benoit Couture	Dodge
69	Domenic Scrivo (R)	MBS Motorsports	Chevrolet
73	Marc-André Lachapelle (R)	Group Theetge	Chevrolet
74	Kevin Lacroix	Innovation Auto Sport	Chevrolet
80	Alex Tagliani	Group Theetge	Chevrolet
84	Larry Jackson	Larry Jackson Racing	Dodge
88	Simon Charbonneau (R)	Eighty8Racing	Chevrolet
93	Jacques Guenette Sr. (R)	JASS Racing	Chevrolet
96	Marc-Antoine Camirand	Paillé Course//Racing	Chevrolet

== Practice ==
The first and only practice session was held on August 23 at 10:15 AM CST. Marc-Antoine Camirand would set the fastest time in the session, with a lap of 1:03.541 and a speed of 80.792 mph (130.022 km/h).

Pos.	#	Driver	Team	Make	Time	Speed
1	96	Marc-Antoine Camirand	Paillé Course//Racing	Chevrolet	1:03.541	80.792
2	3	Justin Arseneau (R)	Ed Hakonson Racing	Chevrolet	1:03.554	80.775
3	27	Andrew Ranger	Paillé Course//Racing	Chevrolet	1:03.799	80.465
Full practice results

== Qualifying ==
Qualifying was held on August 23 at 1:15 PM CST. Andrew Ranger, driving for Paillé Course//Racing, would win the pole with a lap of 1:02.854 and a speed of 81.661 mph (131.421 km/h).

Pos.	#	Driver	Team	Make	Time	Speed
1	27	Andrew Ranger	Paillé Course//Racing	Chevrolet	1:02.854	81.661
2	96	Marc-Antoine Camirand	Paillé Course//Racing	Chevrolet	1:03.386	80.989
3	3	Justin Arseneau (R)	Ed Hakonson Racing	Chevrolet	1:03.586	80.735
4	80	Alex Tagliani	Group Theetge	Chevrolet	1:03.600	80.717
5	39	Alex Guenette	JASS Racing	Chevrolet	1:03.742	80.537
6	36	Alex Labbé	LL Motorsports	Chevrolet	1:03.871	80.375
7	74	Kevin Lacroix	Innovation Auto Sport	Chevrolet	1:03.899	80.339
8	47	L. P. Dumoulin	Dumoulin Compétition	Dodge	1:03.939	80.289
9	9	Mathieu Kingsbury	Innovation Auto Sport	Chevrolet	1:03.955	80.269
10	88	Simon Charbonneau (R)	Eighty8Racing	Chevrolet	1:04.304	79.833
11	17	D. J. Kennington	DJK Racing	Dodge	1:04.464	79.635
12	54	Dave Coursol	Coursol Performance	Chevrolet	1:05.099	78.858
13	1	J. P. Bergeron	Prolon Racing	Ford	1:05.604	78.251
14	37	Simon Dion-Viens	SDV Autosport	Dodge	1:06.356	77.365
15	84	Larry Jackson	Larry Jackson Racing	Dodge	1:06.484	77.216
16	55	Serge Bourdeau	Benoit Couture	Dodge	1:08.805	74.611
17	93	Jacques Guenette Sr. (R)	JASS Racing	Chevrolet	1:09.144	74.245
18	69	Domenic Scrivo (R)	MBS Motorsports	Chevrolet	1:09.366	74.007
19	73	Marc-André Lachapelle (R)	Group Theetge	Chevrolet	1:09.511	73.853
Full qualifying resukts

== Race results ==
Pos	St	#	Driver	Team	Manufacturer	Laps	Led	Status	Points
1	2	96	Marc-Antoine Camirand	Paillé Course//Racing	Chevrolet	43	31	Running	48
2	1	27	Andrew Ranger	Paillé Course//Racing	Chevrolet	43	12	Running	43
3	4	80	Alex Tagliani	Group Theetge	Chevrolet	43	0	Running	41
4	7	74	Kevin Lacroix	Innovation Auto Sport	Chevrolet	43	0	Running	40
5	5	39	Alex Guenette	JASS Racing	Chevrolet	43	0	Running	39
6	6	36	Alex Labbé	LL Motorsports	Chevrolet	43	0	Running	38
7	9	9	Mathieu Kingsbury	Innovation Auto Sport	Chevrolet	43	0	Running	37
8	11	17	D.J. Kennington	DJK Racing	Dodge	43	0	Running	36
9	13	1	J.P. Bergeron	Prolon Racing	Ford	43	0	Running	35
10	12	54	Dave Coursol	Dave Coursol	Dodge	43	0	Running	34
11	14	37	Simon Dion-Viens	SDV Autosport	Dodge	43	0	Running	33
12	16	55	Serge Bourdeau	Benoit Couture	Dodge	43	0	Running	32
13	18	69	Domenic Scrivo (R)	MBS Motorsports	Chevrolet	43	0	Running	31
14	19	73	Marc-André Lachapelle	Group Theetge	Chevrolet	43	0	Running	30
15	10	88	Simon Charbonneau (R)	Eighty8 Racing	Chevrolet	43	0	Running	29
16	8	47	L.P. Dumoulin	Dumoulin Compétition	Dodge	39	0	Suspension	28
17	3	3	Justin Arseneau (R)	Ed Hakonson Racing	Chevrolet	29	0	Transmission	27
18	17	93	Jacques Guenette Sr. (R)	JASS Racing	Chevrolet	26	0	Brakes	26
19	15	84	Larry Jackson	Larry Jackson Racing	Dodge	14	0	Accident	25

== Standings after the race ==
	Pos	Driver	Points
	1	Marc-Antoine Camirand	327
1	2	Andrew Ranger	315 (–12)
1	3	D. J. Kennington	312 (–15)
1	4	Kevin Lacroix	301 (–26)
1	5	L. P. Dumoulin	291 (–36)
	6	Mathieu Kingsbury	287 (–40)
	7	Ryan Vargas	227 (–100)
1	8	Alex Guenette	190 (–137)
2	9	Larry Jackson	173 (–154)
2	10	Donald Theetge	169 (–158)

Previous race: 2025 Les 60 Tours Rousseau Métal	NASCAR Canada Series; 2025 season	Next race: 2025 WeatherTech 200
