= 2025 APC 125 =

10th race of the 2025 NASCAR Canada Series

Race details
- Race 10 of 12 in the 2025 NASCAR Canada Series season
- Date: September 13, 2025
- Location: Delaware Speedway in Delaware, Ontario, Canada
- Course: Permanent racing facility
- Course length: 0.500 miles (0.805 km)
- Distance: 125 laps, 62.5 mi (100.584 km)
- Average speed: 81.522 miles per hour (131.197 km/h)

Pole position
Driver	D. J. Kennington	DJK Racing
- Time: 18.971

Most laps led
Driver	D. J. Kennington	DJK Racing
- Laps: 112

Winner
No. 80	Donald Theetge	Group Theetge

Television in the United States
- Network: REV TV on YouTube
- Announcers: Dave Bradley and Treyten Lapcevich

The 2025 APC 125 was the tenth stock car race of the 2025 NASCAR Canada Series. It was held on Saturday, September 13, at Delaware Speedway, a 0.500 mi (0.805 km) oval shaped racetrack in Delaware, Ontario, Canada and was the first race of a doubleheader. The race was won by Donald Theetge, his first win of the season and first since 2018. Polesitter D. J. Kennington finished in second, and Kevin Lacroix rounded out the podium in third.

== Report ==
=== Background ===
Delaware Speedway is a 0.500 mi (0.805 km) paved race track that is one of the oldest continuously operating tracks in Canada. It is located a few minutes west of London, Ontario northeast of Delaware, Ontario. It hosts stock car racing every Friday night during the summer. The track opened in 1952 as a 0.250 mi (0.402 km) dirt track that was paved in 1960. In August 1969, the track was expanded to a 0.500 mi (0.805 km) paved oval and continues today.

==== Entry list ====
- (R) denotes rookie driver.
- (i) denotes driver who is ineligible for series driver points.

#	Driver	Team	Make
3	Connor Pritiko (R)	Ed Hakonson Racing	Chevrolet
9	Mathieu Kingsbury	Innovation Auto Sport	Chevrolet
17	D. J. Kennington	DJK Racing	Dodge
27	Andrew Ranger	Paillé Course//Racing	Chevrolet
28	Ryan Vargas	DJK Racing	Dodge
30	Jonathan Aarts (R)	Kasey Cash Racing	Dodge
47	L. P. Dumoulin	Dumoulin Compétition	Dodge
69	Domenic Scrivo (R)	MBS Motorsports	Chevrolet
74	Kevin Lacroix	Innovation Auto Sport	Chevrolet
80	Donald Theetge	Group Theetge	Chevrolet
81	Brent Wheller	Brent Wheller Motorsports	Dodge
84	Larry Jackson	Larry Jackson Racing	Dodge
96	Marc-Antoine Camirand	Paillé Course//Racing	Chevrolet
98	Malcom Strachan	Jim Bray Autosport	Ford

== Practice ==
Practice was held on September 13 at 12:46 PM EST. Marc-Antoine Camirand would set the fastest time in the session, with a lap of 18.952 seconds and a speed of 94.977 mph (152.851 km/h).

Pos.	#	Driver	Team	Make	Time	Speed
1	96	Marc-Antoine Camirand	Paillé Course//Racing	Chevrolet	18.952	94.977
2	17	D. J. Kennington	DJK Racing	Dodge	18.960	94.937
3	80	Donald Theetge	Group Theetge	Chevrolet	19.031	94.583
Full practice results

== Qualifying ==
Qualifying was held on September 13 at 5:00 PM EST. D. J. Kennington, driving for DJK Racing, would win the pole with a lap of 18.971 seconds and a speed of 94.882 mph (152.697 km/h).

Pos.	#	Driver	Team	Make	Time	Speed
1	17	D. J. Kennington	DJK Racing	Dodge	18.971	94.882
2	80	Donald Theetge	Group Theetge	Chevrolet	18.995	94.762
3	96	Marc-Antoine Camirand	Paillé Course//Racing	Chevrolet	19.156	93.965
4	3	Connor Pritiko (R)	Ed Hakonson Racing	Chevrolet	19.271	93.405
5	74	Kevin Lacroix	Innovation Auto Sport	Chevrolet	19.351	93.018
6	47	L. P. Dumoulin	Dumoulin Compétition	Dodge	19.356	92.994
7	27	Andrew Ranger	Paillé Course//Racing	Chevrolet	19.386	92.851
8	9	Mathieu Kingsbury	Innovation Auto Sport	Chevrolet	19.472	92.440
9	28	Ryan Vargas	DJK Racing	Dodge	19.626	91.715
10	30	Jonathan Aarts (R)	Kasey Cash Racing	Dodge	19.652	91.594
11	84	Larry Jackson	Larry Jackson Racing	Dodge	19.703	91.357
12	98	Malcom Strachan	Jim Bray Autosport	Ford	19.983	90.077
13	69	Domenic Scrivo (R)	MBS Motorsports	Chevrolet	20.025	89.888
14	81	Brent Wheller	Brent Wheller Motorsports	Dodge	20.181	89.193
Full qualifying results

== Race results ==
Pos	St	#	Driver	Team	Manufacturer	Laps	Led	Status	Points
1	2	80	Donald Theetge	Group Theetge	Chevrolet	125	13	Running	47
2	1	17	D.J. Kennington	DJK Racing	Dodge	125	112	Running	44
3	5	74	Kevin Lacroix	Innovation Auto Sport	Chevrolet	125	0	Running	41
4	7	27	Andrew Ranger	Paillé Course//Racing	Chevrolet	125	0	Running	40
5	4	3	Connor Pritiko (R)	Ed Hakonson Racing	Chevrolet	125	0	Running	39
6	3	96	Marc-Antoine Camirand	Paillé Course//Racing	Chevrolet	125	0	Running	38
7	8	9	Mathieu Kingsbury	Innovation Auto Sport	Chevrolet	125	0	Running	37
8	9	28	Ryan Vargas	DJK Racing	Dodge	124	0	Running	36
9	12	98	Malcom Strachan	Jim Bray Autosport	Ford	121	0	Running	35
10	14	81	Brent Wheller	Brent Wheller Motorsports	Dodge	121	0	Running	34
11	6	47	L.P. Dumoulin	Dumoulin Compétition	Dodge	115	0	Running	33
12	13	69	Domenic Scrivo (R)	MBS Motorsports	Chevrolet	109	0	Running	32
13	10	30	Jonathan Aarts (R)	Kasey Cash Racing	Dodge	97	0	Suspension	31
14	11	84	Larry Jackson	Larry Jackson Racing	Dodge	18	0	Engine	30

== Standings after the race ==
	Pos	Driver	Points
	1	Marc-Antoine Camirand	412
	2	Andrew Ranger	395 (–17)
	3	D. J. Kennington	394 (–18)
1	4	Kevin Lacroix	362 (–50)
1	5	L. P. Dumoulin	360 (–52)
	6	Mathieu Kingsbury	346 (–66)
	7	Ryan Vargas	263 (–149)
	8	Alex Guenette	223 (–189)
	9	Larry Jackson	220 (–192)
1	10	Donald Theetge	216 (–196)

Previous race: 2025 WeatherTech 200	NASCAR Canada Series; 2025 season	Next race: 2025 NTN 125
