= 2025 NTN 125 =

11th race of the 2025 NASCAR Canada Series

Race details
- Race 11 of 12 in the 2025 NASCAR Canada Series season
- Date: September 13, 2025
- Official name: 2025 NTN BCA 125
- Location: Delaware Speedway in Delaware, Ontario, Canada
- Course: Permanent racing facility
- Course length: 0.500 miles (0.805 km)
- Distance: 125 laps, 62.5 mi (100.584 km)
- Average speed: 78.017 miles per hour (125.556 km/h)

Pole position
Driver	Donald Theetge	Group Theetge

Most laps led
Driver	Donald Theetge	Group Theetge
- Laps: 68

Winner
No. 80	Donald Theetge	Group Theetge

Television in the United States
- Network: REV TV on YouTube
- Announcers: Dave Bradley and Treyten Lapcevich

The 2025 NTN BCA 125 was the eleventh stock car race of the 2025 NASCAR Canada Series. It was held on Saturday, September 13, at Delaware Speedway, a 0.500 mi (0.805 km) oval shaped racetrack in Delaware, Ontario, Canada and was the second race of a doubleheader. The race was won by Donald Theetge, his second win of the season, sweeping the doubleheader. As in the previous race, D. J. Kennington finished in second and Kevin Lacroix finished third.

== Report ==
=== Background ===
Delaware Speedway is a 0.500 mi (0.805 km) paved race track that is one of the oldest continuously operating tracks in Canada. It is located a few minutes west of London, Ontario northeast of Delaware, Ontario. It hosts stock car racing every Friday night during the summer. The track opened in 1952 as a 0.250 mi (0.402 km) dirt track that was paved in 1960. In August 1969, the track was expanded to a 0.500 mi (0.805 km) paved oval and continues today.

==== Entry list ====
- (R) denotes rookie driver.
- (i) denotes driver who is ineligible for series driver points.

#	Driver	Team	Make
3	Connor Pritiko (R)	Ed Hakonson Racing	Chevrolet
9	Mathieu Kingsbury	Innovation Auto Sport	Chevrolet
17	D. J. Kennington	DJK Racing	Dodge
27	Andrew Ranger	Paillé Course//Racing	Chevrolet
28	Ryan Vargas	DJK Racing	Dodge
30	Jonathan Aarts (R)	Kasey Cash Racing	Dodge
47	L. P. Dumolin	Dumoulin Compétition	Dodge
69	Domenic Scrivo (R)	MBS Motorsports	Chevrolet
74	Kevin Lacroix	Innovation Auto Sport	Chevrolet
80	Donald Theetge	Group Theetge	Chevrolet
81	Brent Wheller	Brent Wheller Motorsports	Dodge
84	Larry Jackson	Larry Jackson Racing	Dodge
96	Marc-Antoine Camirand	Paillé Course//Racing	Chevrolet
98	Malcom Strachan	Jim Bray Autosport	Ford

== Practice ==
Practice was held on September 13 at 12:46 PM EST. Marc-Antoine Camirand would set the fastest time in the session, with a lap of 18.952 seconds and a speed of 94.977 mph (152.851 km/h).

Pos.	#	Driver	Team	Make	Time	Speed
1	96	Marc-Antoine Camirand	Paillé Course//Racing	Chevrolet	18.952	94.977
2	17	D. J. Kennington	DJK Racing	Dodge	18.960	94.937
3	80	Donald Theetge	Group Theetge	Chevrolet	19.031	94.583
Full practice results

== Qualifying ==
The starting lineup was based on lap times and speed from the previous race. Donald Theetge was awarded the pole position.

== Race results ==
Pos	St	#	Driver	Team	Manufacturer	Laps	Led	Status	Points
1	1	80	Donald Theetge	Group Theetge	Chevrolet	125	68	Running	48
2	2	17	D. J. Kennington	DJK Racing	Dodge	125	57	Running	43
3	3	74	Kevin Lacroix	Innovation Auto Sport	Chevrolet	125	0	Running	41
4	8	28	Ryan Vargas	DJK Racing	Dodge	125	0	Running	40
5	4	96	Marc-Antoine Camirand	Paillé Course//Racing	Chevrolet	125	0	Running	39
6	5	3	Connor Pritiko (R)	Ed Hakonson Racing	Chevrolet	125	0	Running	38
7	6	27	Andrew Ranger	Paillé Course//Racing	Chevrolet	125	0	Running	37
8	9	9	Mathieu Kingsbury	Innovation Auto Sport	Chevrolet	124	0	Running	36
9	12	98	Malcolm Strachan	Jim Bray Autosport	Ford	123	0	Running	35
10	10	30	Jonathan Aarts (R)	Kasey Cash Racing	Dodge	122	0	Running	34
11	13	81	Brent Wheller	Brent Wheller Motorsports	Dodge	120	0	Running	33
12	14	69	Domenic Scrivo (R)	MBS Motorsports	Chevrolet	119	0	Running	32
13	7	47	L. P. Dumoulin	Dumoulin Compétition	Dodge	6	0	Suspension	31
14	11	84	Larry Jackson	Larry Jackson Racing	Dodge	0	0	Did Not Start	30

== Standings after the race ==
	Pos	Driver	Points
	1	Marc-Antoine Camirand	451
1	2	D. J. Kennington	437 (–14)
1	3	Andrew Ranger	432 (–19)
	4	Kevin Lacroix	403 (–48)
	5	L. P. Dumoulin	391 (–50)
	6	Mathieu Kingsbury	382 (–69)
	7	Ryan Vargas	303 (–148)
2	8	Donald Theetge	264 (–187)
	9	Larry Jackson	250 (–201)
1	10	Alex Guenette	223 (–228)

Previous race: 2025 APC 125	NASCAR Canada Series; 2025 season	Next race: 2025 XPN 250
