= 2025 Leland Industries 250 =

4th race of the 2025 NASCAR Canada Series

Race details
- Race 4 of 12 in the 2025 NASCAR Canada Series season
- Date: July 16, 2025
- Location: Sutherland Automotive Speedway in Saskatoon, Saskatchewan, Canada
- Course: Permanent racing facility
- Course length: 0.333 miles (0.536 km)
- Distance: 250 laps, 83.250 mi (133.977 km)

Pole position
Driver	Kevin Lacroix	Innovation Auto Sport
- Time: 14.888

Most laps led
Driver	Kevin Lacroix	Innovation Auto Sport
- Laps: 226

Winner
No. 74	Kevin Lacroix	Innovation Auto Sport

The 2025 Leland Industries 250, also called the Leland 250, was the fourth stock car race of the 2025 NASCAR Canada Series. The race was held on Wednesday, July 16, 2025, at Sutherland Automotive Speedway in Saskatoon, Saskatchewan, Canada. The race took the scheduled 250 laps to complete. The race was won by Kevin Lacroix, although he did not cross the finish line first; on the final lap, Marc-Antoine Camirand took the lead from Lacroix after a bump and run move and initially was declared the winner before being penalized for rough driving, with the win being handed to Lacroix. Because of Camirand's penalty, Jason Hathaway was scored in second, while L. P. Dumoulin rounded out the podium in third.

== Report ==
=== Background ===
Sutherland Automotive Speedway is a paved oval auto racing facility just north of Saskatoon, Saskatchewan, Canada. It is owned and operated by the Saskatoon Stock Car Racing Association Ltd. (SSCRA). Construction of the 0.333 mi (0.536 km) walled track with progressive banking began in April 2005. The track opened in July 2006, a year ahead of schedule.

==== Entry list ====
- (R) denotes rookie driver.
- (i) denotes driver who is ineligible for series driver points.

#	Driver	Team	Make
3	Jason Hathaway	Ed Hackonson Racing	Chevrolet
9	Mathieu Kingsbury	Innovation Auto Sport	Chevrolet
10	Rob Naismith (R)	MRN Racing	Chevrolet
17	D. J. Kennington	DJK Racing	Dodge
27	Andrew Ranger	Paillé Course//Racing	Chevrolet
28	Ryan Vargas	DJK Racing	Dodge
46	Matthew Shirley (R)	DJK Racing	Dodge
47	L. P. Dumoulin	Dumoulin Compétition	Dodge
74	Kevin Lacroix	Innovation Auto Sport	Chevrolet
80	Donald Theetge	Group Theetge	Chevrolet
96	Marc-Antoine Camirand	Paillé Course//Racing	Chevrolet

== Practice ==
The first and only practice session was held on Wednesday, July 16, at 12:15 PM CT. L. P. Dumoulin would set the fastest time in the session, with a lap of 14.892 seconds and a speed of 80.500 mph (129.552 km/h).

Pos.	#	Driver	Team	Make	Time	Speed
1	47	L. P. Dumoulin	Dumoulin Competition	Dodge	14.892	80.500
2	80	Donald Theetge	Group Theetge	Chevrolet	14.900	80.456
3	28	Ryan Vargas	DJK Racing	Dodge	14.999	79.925
Full practice results

== Qualifying ==
Qualifying was held on Wednesday, July 16, at 4:35 PM CT. Kevin Lacroix, driving for Innovation Auto Sport, would win the pole with a lap of 14.888 seconds and a speed of 80.521 mph (129.586 km/h).

Pos.	#	Driver	Team	Make	Time	Speed
1	74	Kevin Lacroix	Innovation Auto Sport	Chevrolet	14.888	80.521
2	3	Jason Hathaway	Ed Hackonson Racing	Chevrolet	14.915	80.375
3	17	D. J. Kennington	DJK Racing	Dodge	14.926	80.316
4	80	Donald Theetge	Group Theetge	Chevrolet	14.956	80.155
5	47	L. P. Dumoulin	Dumoulin Compétition	Dodge	14.981	80.021
6	9	Mathieu Kingsbury	Innovation Auto Sport	Chevrolet	14.984	80.005
7	28	Ryan Vargas	DJK Racing	Dodge	15.025	79.787
8	96	Marc-Antoine Camirand	Paillé Course//Racing	Chevrolet	15.068	79.559
9	46	Matthew Shirley (R)	DJK Racing	Dodge	15.200	78.868
10	27	Andrew Ranger	Paillé Course//Racing	Chevrolet	15.256	78.579
11	10	Rob Naismith (R)	MRN Racing	Chevrolet	15.717	76.274
Full qualifying results

== Race results ==
Pos	St	#	Driver	Team	Manufacturer	Laps	Led	Status	Points
1	1	74	Kevin Lacroix	Innovation Auto Sport	Chevrolet	250	226	Running	48
2	2	3	Jason Hathaway	Ed Hackonson Racing	Chevrolet	250	23	Running	43
3	5	47	L. P. Dumoulin	Dumoulin Compétition	Dodge	250	0	Running	41
4	8	96	Marc-Antoine Camirand (Note: Camirand originally finished the race in 1st, but was penalized a lap due to rough driving.)	Paillé Course//Racing	Chevrolet	249	1	Running	41
5	7	28	Ryan Vargas	DJK Racing	Dodge	249	0	Running	39
6	3	17	D. J. Kennington	DJK Racing	Dodge	249	0	Running	38
7	6	9	Mathieu Kingsbury	Innovation Auto Sport	Chevrolet	248	0	Running	37
8	10	27	Andrew Ranger	Paillé Course//Racing	Chevrolet	248	0	Running	36
9	4	80	Donald Theetge	Group Theetge	Chevrolet	248	0	Running	35
10	9	46	Matthew Shirley (R)	DJK Racing	Dodge	248	0	Running	34
11	11	10	Rob Naismith (R)	MRN Racing	Chevrolet	242	0	Running	33

== Standings after the race ==
	Pos	Driver	Points
	1	Marc-Antoine Camirand	166
2	2	Kevin Lacroix	165 (–1)
1	3	D. J. Kennington	163 (–3)
1	4	Andrew Ranger	154 (–12)
	5	Ryan Vargas	151 (–15)
	6	L. P. Dumoulin	150 (–16)
	7	Jason Hathaway	149 (–17)
	8	Mathieu Kingsbury	142 (–24)
	9	Donald Theetge	109 (–57)
7	10	Matthew Shirley	69 (–97)

Previous race: 2025 NAPA 300	NASCAR Canada Series; 2025 season	Next race: 2025 Calabogie 150 Clash of the Titans
