= 2025 Les 60 Tours Rousseau Métal =

7th race of the 2025 NASCAR Canada Series

Race details
- Race 7 of 12 in the 2025 NASCAR Canada Series season
- Date: August 10, 2025
- Official name: 2025 Les 60 Tours Rousseau Métal at the Grand Prix de Trois-Rivières
- Location: Circuit Trois-Rivières in Trois-Rivières, Quebec, Canada
- Course: Permanent racing facility
- Course length: 1.521 miles (2.448 km)
- Distance: 63 laps, 95.823 mi (154.224 km)
- Scheduled distance: 60 laps, 91.26 mi (146.88 km)
- Average speed: 52.876 miles per hour (85.096 km/h)

Pole position
Driver	Marc-Antoine Camirand	Paillé Course//Racing
- Time: 1:06.377

Most laps led
Driver	Andrew Ranger	Paillé Course//Racing
- Laps: 43

Winner
No. 27	Andrew Ranger	Paillé Course//Racing

The 2025 Les 60 Tours Rousseau Métal at the Grand Prix de Trois-Rivières was the seventh stock car race of the 2025 NASCAR Canada Series. It was held on Sunday, August 10, 2025, at Circuit Trois-Rivières, a 1.521 mi (2.448 km) street circuit in Trois-Rivières, Quebec, Canada. The race went beyond the scheduled 60 lap distance, being extended to 63 laps due to overtime. The race was won by Andrew Ranger, his first win of the season, fifth in the GP3R, and first win at the track since 2012. Polesitter Marc-Antoine Camirand would finish the race in second, and L. P. Dumoulin rounded out the podium in third.

== Report ==
=== Background ===
The Circuit Trois-Rivières is a street circuit in Trois-Rivières, Quebec, Canada. The circuit has been the home of the annual Grand Prix de Trois-Rivières, the longest-running street race in North America, since 1967.

==== Entry list ====
- (R) denotes rookie driver.
- (i) denotes driver who is ineligible for series driver points.

#	Driver	Team	Make
1	J. P. Bergeron	Prolon Racing	Ford
3	Alexandre Fortin (R)	Ed Hakonson Racing	Chevrolet
04	Jean-François Dumoulin	Dumoulin Compétition	Dodge
7	Raphaël Lessard	Innovation Auto Sport	Chevrolet
9	Mathieu Kingsbury	Innovation Auto Sport	Chevrolet
17	D. J. Kennington	DJK Racing	Dodge
22	Kyle Steckly	MBS Motorsports	Chevrolet
27	Andrew Ranger	Paillé Course//Racing	Chevrolet
28	Ryan Vargas	DJK Racing	Dodge
36	Alex Labbé	LL Motorsports	Chevrolet
37	Simon Dion-Viens	SDV Autosport	Dodge
39	Alex Guenette	JASS Racing	Chevrolet
47	L. P. Dumolin	Dumoulin Compétition	Dodge
50	Vittorio Ghirelli	Dumoulin Compétition	Chevrolet
54	Dave Coursol	Coursol Performance	Chevrolet
55	Serge Bourdeau	Benoit Couture	Dodge
59	Gary Klutt	Legendary Motorcar Company	Dodge
69	Domenic Scrivo (R)	MBS Motorsports	Chevrolet
73	Donald Theetge	Group Theetge	Chevrolet
74	Kevin Lacroix	Innovation Auto Sport	Chevrolet
75	Benoit Couture (R)	Benoit Couture	Dodge
80	Alex Tagliani	Group Theetge	Chevrolet
83	Martin Goulet Jr. (R)	Goulet Motorsports	Chevrolet
84	Larry Jackson	Larry Jackson Racing	Dodge
85	Darryl Timmers (R)	Larry Jackson Racing	Dodge
87	Sam Fellows	Fellows McGraw Racing	Chevrolet
88	Simon Charbonneau (R)	Eighty8Racing	Chevrolet
92	Dexter Stacey	Ed Hakonson Racing	Chevrolet
96	Marc-Antoine Camirand	Paillé Course//Racing	Chevrolet

== Practice ==
The first and only practice session was held on August 9 at 12:28 PM EST. Marc-Antoine Camirand would set the fastest time in the session, with a lap of 1:07.429 and a speed of 81.686 mph (131.461 km/h).

Pos.	#	Driver	Team	Make	Time	Speed
1	96	Marc-Antoine Camirand	Paillé Course//Racing	Chevrolet	1:07.429	81.686
2	47	L. P. Dumolin	Dumoulin Compétition	Dodge	1:07.519	81.577
3	80	Alex Tagliani	Group Theetge	Chevrolet	1:07.774	81.270
Full practice results

== Qualifying ==
Qualifying was held on August 9 at 4:50 PM EST. Marc-Antoine Camirand, driving for Paillé Course//Racing, would win the pole with a lap of 1:06.377 and a speed of 82.981 mph (133.545 km/h).

Pos.	#	Driver	Team	Make	Time	Speed
1	96	Marc-Antoine Camirand	Paillé Course//Racing	Chevrolet	1:06.377	82.981
2	27	Andrew Ranger	Paillé Course//Racing	Chevrolet	1:06.512	82.812
3	80	Alex Tagliani	Group Theetge	Chevrolet	1:06.732	82.539
4	47	L. P. Dumolin	Dumoulin Compétition	Dodge	1:07.065	82.129
5	39	Alex Guenette	JASS Racing	Chevrolet	1:07.184	81.984
6	74	Kevin Lacroix	Innovation Auto Sport	Chevrolet	1:07.251	81.902
7	7	Raphaël Lessard	Innovation Auto Sport	Chevrolet	1:07.440	81.673
8	36	Alex Labbé	LL Motorsports	Chevrolet	1:07.493	81.608
9	17	D. J. Kennington	DJK Racing	Dodge	1:07.607	81.471
10	88	Simon Charbonneau (R)	Eighty8Racing	Chevrolet	1:07.631	81.442
11	59	Gary Klutt	Legendary Motorcar Company	Dodge	1:07.645	81.425
12	04	J. F. Dumoulin	Dumoulin Compétition	Dodge	1:07.785	81.256
13	87	Sam Fellows	Fellows McGraw Racing	Chevrolet	1:07.945	81.066
14	50	Vittorio Ghirelli	Dumoulin Compétition	Chevrolet	1:08.111	80.868
15	9	Mathieu Kingsbury	Innovation Auto Sport	Chevrolet	1:08.227	80.731
16	73	Donald Theetge	Group Theetge	Chevrolet	1:08.431	80.490
17	37	Simon Dion-Viens	SDV Autosport	Dodge	1:08.471	80.443
18	28	Ryan Vargas	DJK Racing	Dodge	1:08.491	80.419
19	85	Darryl Timmers (R)	Larry Jackson Racing	Dodge	1:08.553	80.347
20	3	Alexandre Fortin (R)	Ed Hakonson Racing	Chevrolet	1:08.671	80.209
21	83	Martin Goulet Jr. (R)	Goulet Motorsports	Chevrolet	1:08.726	80.144
22	22	Kyle Steckly	MBS Motorsports	Chevrolet	1:08.784	80.077
23	1	J. P. Bergeron	Prolon Racing	Ford	1:08.985	79.843
24	54	Dave Coursol	Coursol Performance	Chevrolet	1:09.591	79.148
25	92	Dexter Stacey	Ed Hakonson Racing	Chevrolet	1:09.656	79.074
26	84	Larry Jackson	Larry Jackson Racing	Dodge	1:10.818	77.777
27	69	Domenic Scrivo (R)	MBS Motorsports	Chevrolet	1:11.530	77.003
28	55	Serge Bourdeau	Benoit Couture	Dodge	1:12.878	75.578
29	75	Benoit Couture (R)	Benoit Couture	Dodge	1:13.363	75.079

== Race results ==
Pos	St	#	Driver	Team	Manufacturer	Laps	Led	Status	Points
1	2	27	Andrew Ranger	Paillé Course//Racing	Chevrolet	63	43	Running	48
2	1	96	Marc-Antoine Camirand	Paillé Course//Racing	Chevrolet	63	1	Running	43
3	4	47	L. P. Dumoulin	Dumoulin Compétition	Dodge	63	0	Running	41
4	7	7	Raphaël Lessard	Innovation Auto Sport	Chevrolet	63	0	Running	40
5	12	04	J. F. Dumoulin	Dumoulin Compétition	Dodge	63	0	Running	39
6	19	85	Darryl Timmers (R)	Larry Jackson Racing	Dodge	63	0	Running	38
7	9	17	D. J. Kennington	DJK Racing	Dodge	63	0	Running	37
8	5	39	Alex Guenette	JASS Racing	Chevrolet	63	0	Running	36
9	8	36	Alex Labbé	LL Motorsports	Chevrolet	63	0	Running	35
10	6	74	Kevin Lacroix	Innovation Auto Sport	Chevrolet	63	12	Running	35
11	25	1	J. P. Bergeron	Prolon Racing	Ford	63	0	Running	33
12	26	22	Kyle Steckly	MBS Motorsports	Chevrolet	63	0	Running	32
13	15	9	Mathieu Kingsbury	Innovation Auto Sport	Chevrolet	63	0	Running	31
14	22	84	Larry Jackson	Larry Jackson Racing	Dodge	63	0	Running	30
15	17	37	Simon Dion-Viens	SDV Autosport	Dodge	63	0	Running	29
16	23	54	Dave Coursol	Coursol Performance	Dodge	63	0	Running	28
17	28	55	Serge Bourdeau	Benoit Couture	Dodge	63	0	Running	27
18	11	59	Gary Klutt	Legendary Motorcar Company	Dodge	63	0	Running	26
19	24	69	Domenic Scrivo (R)	MBS Motorsports	Chevrolet	63	0	Running	25
20	3	80	Alex Tagliani	Group Theetge	Chevrolet	59	7	Running	25
21	13	87	Sam Fellows	Fellows McGraw Racing	Chevrolet	56	0	Accident	23
22	20	3	Alexandre Fortin (R)	Ed Hakonson Racing	Chevrolet	49	0	Accident	22
23	27	92	Dexter Stacey	Ed Hakonson Racing	Chevrolet	46	0	Engine	21
24	29	75	Benoit Couture (R)	Benoit Couture	Dodge	44	0	Running	20
25	14	50	Vittorio Ghirelli	Dumoulin Compétition	Chevrolet	42	0	Accident	19
26	10	88	Simon Charbonneau (R)	Eighty8 Racing	Chevrolet	31	0	Accident	18
27	18	28	Ryan Vargas	DJK Racing	Dodge	31	0	Electrical	17
28	16	73	Donald Theetge	Group Theetge	Chevrolet	29	0	Accident	16
29	21	83	Martin Goulet Jr. (R)	Goulet Motorsports	Dodge	5	0	Accident	15

== Standings after the race ==
	Pos	Driver	Points
1	1	Marc-Antoine Camirand	279
1	2	D. J. Kennington	276 (–3)
1	3	Andrew Ranger	272 (–7)
1	4	L. P. Dumoulin	263 (–16)
2	5	Kevin Lacroix	261 (–18)
	6	Mathieu Kingsbury	250 (–29)
	7	Ryan Vargas	227 (–52)
	8	Donald Theetge	169 (–110)
2	9	Alex Guenette	151 (–128)
1	10	Jason Hathaway	149 (–130)

Previous race: 2025 Bud Light 250	NASCAR Canada Series; 2025 season	Next race: 2025 Evirum 100
