= 2025 Bud Light 250 =

6th race of the 2025 NASCAR Canada Series

Race details
- Race 6 of 12 in the 2025 NASCAR Canada Series season
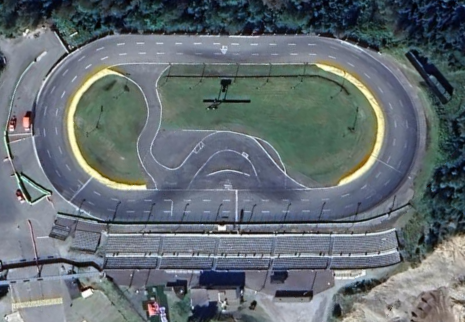
- Date: August 2, 2025
- Location: Autodrome Chaudière in Vallée-Jonction, Quebec, Canada
- Course: Permanent racing facility
- Course length: 0.250 miles (0.402 km)
- Distance: 250 laps, 62.5 mi (100.58 km)
- Average speed: 48.470 miles per hour (78.005 km/h)

Pole position
Driver	Donald Theetge	Group Theetge
- Time: 13.374

Most laps led
Driver	Donald Theetge	Group Theetge
- Laps: 114

Winner
No. 45	Will Larue	Larue Motorsports

Television in the United States
- Network: REV TV on YouTube

The 2025 Bud Light 250 was the sixth stock car race of the 2025 NASCAR Canada Series. It was held on Saturday, August 2, 2025, at Autodrome Chaudière, a 0.250 mi (0.402 km) oval shaped racetrack in Vallée-Jonction, Quebec, Canada. Originally scheduled for May 31 as the second event of the season, the race was moved due to inclement weather. The race took the scheduled 250 laps to complete. The race was won by Will Larue in just his fourth career start in the series. Polesitter Donald Theetge finished in second, and Kevin Lacroix rounded out the podium in third.

== Report ==
=== Background ===
Autodrome Chaudière is a 0.250 mi (0.402 km), high banked, asphalt short track located in Vallée-Jonction, Quebec, Canada, about 65 km (40 mi) south of Quebec City. The circuit opened in 1992 as a dirt track. In 2005, the track underwent resurfacing to convert it into an asphalt track.

==== Entry list ====
- (R) denotes rookie driver.
- (i) denotes driver who is ineligible for series driver points.

#	Driver	Team	Make
3	Dexter Stacey	Ed Hakonson Racing	Chevrolet
04	Jean-François Dumoulin	Dumoulin Compétition	Dodge
9	Mathieu Kingsbury	Innovation Auto Sport	Chevrolet
17	D. J. Kennington	DJK Racing	Dodge
27	Andrew Ranger	Paillé Course//Racing	Chevrolet
28	Ryan Vargas	DJK Racing	Dodge
36	Alex Labbé	LL Motorsports	Chevrolet
37	Simon Dion-Viens	SDV Autosport	Dodge
39	Alex Guenette	JASS Racing	Chevrolet
45	Will Larue (R)	Larue Motorsports	Chevrolet
47	L. P. Dumolin	Dumoulin Compétition	Dodge
54	Dave Coursol	Coursol Performance	Chevrolet
74	Kevin Lacroix	Innovation Auto Sport	Chevrolet
80	Donald Theetge	Group Theetge	Chevrolet
84	Larry Jackson	Larry Jackson Racing	Dodge
96	Marc-Antoine Camirand	Paillé Course//Racing	Chevrolet
97	Maxime Gauvreau (R)	Equipe de Course	Chevrolet

== Practice ==
The first and only practice session was originally scheduled to be held on Saturday, May 31, at 12:00 PM EST. It was held on Saturday, August 2, at 12:00 PM EST. Donald Theetge would set the fastest time in the session, with a lap of 13.245 seconds and a speed of 67.950 mph (109.355 km/h).

Pos.	#	Driver	Team	Make	Time	Speed
1	80	Donald Theetge	Group Theetge	Chevrolet	13.245	67.950
2	45	Will Larue	Larue Motorsports	Chevrolet	13.289	67.725
3	9	Mathieu Kingsbury	Innovation Auto Sport	Chevrolet	13.331	67.512
Full practice results

== Qualifying ==
Qualifying was originally scheduled to be held on Saturday, May 31, at 4:00 PM EST. It was held on Saturday, August 2, at 4:00 PM EST. Donald Theetge, driving for Group Theetge, would win the pole with a lap of 13.374 seconds and a speed of 67.295 mph (108.301 km/h).

Pos.	#	Driver	Team	Make	Time	Speed
1	80	Donald Theetge	Group Theetge	Chevrolet	13.374	67.295
2	39	Alex Guenette	JASS Racing	Chevrolet	13.476	66.785
3	96	Marc-Antoine Camirand	Paillé Course//Racing	Chevrolet	13.478	66.775
4	9	Mathieu Kingsbury	Innovation Auto Sport	Chevrolet	13.498	66.677
5	97	Maxime Gauvreau (R)	Equipe de Course	Chevrolet	13.511	66.612
6	36	Alex Labbé	LL Motorsports	Chevrolet	13.526	66.539
7	28	Ryan Vargas	DJK Racing	Dodge	13.527	66.534
8	45	Will Larue (R)	Larue Motorsports	Chevrolet	13.544	66.450
9	54	Dave Coursol	Coursol Performance	Chevrolet	13.552	66.411
10	74	Kevin Lacroix	Innovation Auto Sport	Chevrolet	13.575	66.298
11	27	Andrew Ranger	Paillé Course//Racing	Chevrolet	13.612	66.118
12	47	L. P. Dumolin	Dumoulin Compétition	Dodge	13.642	65.973
13	17	D. J. Kennington	DJK Racing	Dodge	13.677	65.804
14	3	Dexter Stacey	Ed Hackonson Racing	Chevrolet	13.690	65.741
15	84	Larry Jackson	Larry Jackson Racing	Dodge	13.717	65.612
16	37	Simon Dion-Viens	SDV Autosport	Dodge	13.744	65.483
17	04	Jean-François Dumoulin	Dumoulin Compétition	Dodge	13.800	65.217

== Race results ==
Pos	St	#	Driver	Team	Manufacturer	Laps	Led	Status	Points
1	8	45	Will Larue (R)	Larue Motorsports	Chevrolet	250	99	Running	47
2	1	80	Donald Theetge	Group Theetge	Chevrolet	250	114	Running	44
3	10	74	Kevin Lacroix	Innovation Auto Sport	Chevrolet	250	0	Running	41
4	13	17	D.J. Kennington	DJK Racing	Dodge	250	0	Running	40
5	4	9	Matthieu Kingsbury	Innovation Auto Sport	Chevrolet	250	37	Running	40
6	6	36	Alex Labbé	LL Motorsports	Chevrolet	250	0	Running	38
7	7	28	Ryan Vargas	DJK Racing	Dodge	250	0	Running	37
8	9	54	Dave Coursol	Coursol Performance	Chevrolet	250	0	Running	36
9	14	3	Dexter Stacey	Ed Hackonson Racing	Chevrolet	250	0	Running	35
10	15	84	Larry Jackson	Larry Jackson Racing	Dodge	250	0	Running	34
11	16	37	Simon Dion-Viens	SDV Autosport	Dodge	250	0	Running	33
12	2	39	Alex Guenette	JASS Racing	Chevrolet	246	0	Running	32
13	12	47	L.P. Dumoulin	Dumoulin Compétition	Dodge	233	0	Running	31
14	11	27	Andrew Ranger	Paillé Course//Racing	Chevrolet	230	0	Running	30
15	17	04	Jean-François Dumoulin	Dumoulin Compétition	Dodge	220	0	Vibration	29
16	3	96	Marc-Antoine Camirand	Paillé Course//Racing	Chevrolet	145	0	Accident	28
17	5	97	Maxime Gauvreau (R)	Equipe de Course	Chevrolet	133	0	Engine	27

== Standings after the race ==
	Pos	Driver	Points
1	1	D. J. Kennington	239
1	2	Marc-Antoine Camirand	236 (–3)
2	3	Kevin Lacroix	226 (–13)
1	4	Andrew Ranger	224 (–15)
1	5	L. P. Dumoulin	222 (–17)
	6	Mathieu Kingsbury	219 (–20)
	7	Ryan Vargas	210 (–29)
1	8	Donald Theetge	153 (–86)
1	9	Jason Hathaway	149 (–90)
	10	Larry Jackson	118 (–121)

Previous race: 2025 Calabogie 150 Clash of the Titans	NASCAR Canada Series; 2025 season	Next race: 2025 Les 60 Tours Rousseau Métal
