= Autodrome Montmagny =

Motorsport venue in Montmagny, Quebec

- Location: 455 Chemin St-Léon, Montmagny, Quebec
- Coordinates: 46°56′16″N 70°33′12″W
- Capacity: 4,000
- Owner: Kenny Theriault & Mélanie Picard
- Opened: 1994
- Major events: Current: NASCAR Canada Series; XPN Burn-X 125 (2024–present); Delta Electrolyte 150 (2026–present); American Canadian Tour (2022–present); Former: CASCAR Super Series (2002)
- Website: http://www.autodromemontmagnyspeedway.com

Paved Oval (1998–present)
- Surface: Asphalt
- Length: 0.604 km (0.375 mi)
- Turns: 4

Road Course (2014–present)
- Surface: Asphalt
- Length: 2.000 km (1.243 mi)
- Turns: 12

Original Dirt Oval (1994–1997)
- Surface: Dirt
- Length: 0.805 km (0.500 mi)
- Turns: 4

The Autodrome Montmagny is a multi-track motorsport venue located in Montmagny (Canada), approximately 80 km (50 mi) east of Quebec City. The facility features a 0.375 mi (0.604 km) oval track, a 2.000 km (1.243 mi) road course and a dragstrip.

Inaugurated in 1994, it was originally a 0.500 mi (0.805 km) oval dirt track. In 1998, it was paved and reduced to its present oval length. The road course was built for the 2014 season, using the oval track.

The racetrack was the property of the American stock car driver Ralph Nason for a decade before being sold to local owners in 2010. The track hosts stock car races (Quebec's ACT Series, PASS North, Sportsman Quebec) and drift competition (Drift Mania Canadian Championship). It is scheduled to host the season finale of the NASCAR Canada Series since 2024.
