= Kyle Steckly =

Canadian racing driver (born 2005)

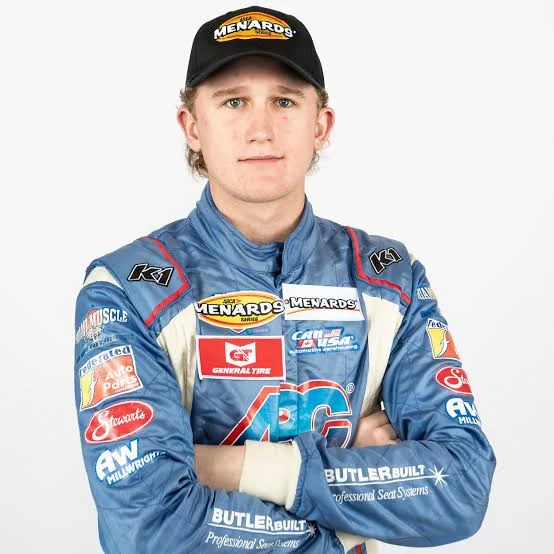
- Born: April 9, 2005 (age 21); Milverton, Ontario, Canada

NASCAR Canada Series career
- 17 races run over 5 years
- Car no., team: No. 22 (MBS Motorsports)
- 2026 position: 28th
- Best finish: 19th (2023)
- First race: 2022 Leland Industries Twin 125s Race 1 (Saskatoon)
- Last race: 2026 NTN BCA 200 (Delaware)
Wins	Top tens	Poles
0	9	3

ARCA Menards Series career
- 4 races run over 2 years
- Best finish: 45th (2026)
- First race: 2025 Ride the 'Dente 200 (Daytona)
- Last race: 2026 Ashley Furniture 150 (Chicagoland)
Wins	Top tens	Poles
0	1	0

ARCA Menards Series West career
- 1 race run over 1 year
- Best finish: 45th (2026)
- First race: 2026 Portland 112 (Portland)
Wins	Top tens	Poles
0	1	0
- Statistics up to date as of November 2, 2026.

Kyle Steckly (born April 9, 2005) is a Canadian professional stock car racing driver who competes full-time in the ASA Stars National Tour, driving the No. 22S Toyota for Wilson Motorsports, and in the APC United Late Model Series, driving the No. 22 for 22 Racing. He also last competed part-time in the ARCA Menards Series, driving the No. 2 Toyota for RAFA Racing Team, and in the NASCAR Canada Series, driving the No. 22 Chevrolet for MBS Motorsports. He is the son of former racing driver Scott Steckly, who is a former champion of the NASCAR Canada Series, and team owner.

Steckly has previously competed in other series such as the ASA CRA Super Series and the ASA Southern Super Series.

== Racing career ==
In 2012, Steckly started his racing career in an Asphalt Micro Sprint car, at the age of seven, securing the Rookie of the year achievement and the track Championship in his first year, racing at Grand Bend Speedway. He then moved to the Junior Late Model Division, a touring series for children driving small sized stock cars. Steckly completed multiple years in this division before moving to a full sized car, and collecting another Rookie of the year award at Flamborough Speedway.

In 2021, Steckly made his Pro Late Model debut, at Flamborough Speedway, securing another Rookie of the year and Championship. In 2022, he made his APC United Late Model Series debut, driving the No. 22. He secured second place in points and another Rookie of the year. He won the APC Series Championship back-to-back in 2023 and 2024.

Steckly debuted in the NASCAR Pinty’s Series in 2022, finishing fourth in his first start. He ran thirteen more races between 2022 and 2025, with a best finish of second. He will return to run three more events in 2026.

On February 5, 2025, it was announced that Steckly would drive a partial schedule in the ARCA Menards Series, with his first race coming at the season opening race at Daytona International Speedway in 2025, driving a second entry for Rette Jones Racing (Cleetus McFarland drove the No. 30), after signing a multiyear deal with the team. He had previously driven for the team in the pre-season test held a month prior.

On January 16, 2026, Steckly announced that he would be driving for Wilson Motorsports in the 2026 ASA STARS National Tour. He would also return to the Canada Series on a part-time basis.

== Motorsports career results ==
=== Stock car career summary ===
Season	Series	Team	Races	Wins	Top 5	Top 10	Points	Position
2022	NASCAR Pinty's Series	22 Racing	3	0	1	1	100	27th
2023	NASCAR Pinty's Series	22 Racing	5	0	1	2	159	19th
2024	ASA STARS National Tour	Rette Jones Racing	10	1	2	6	573	**2nd**
2024	CARS Pro Late Model Tour	22 Racing	1	0	0	1	0	N/A
2024	NASCAR Canada Series	22 Racing	3	0	3	3	121	21st
2025	ASA STARS National Tour	Rette Jones Racing	12	0	1	5	564	6th
2025	NASCAR Canada Series	MBS Motorsports	3	0	0	1	87	27th
2025	ARCA Menards Series	Rette Jones Racing	1	0	0	0	12	138th
2026	ASA STARS National Tour	Wilson Motorsports	11	1	6	7	679	**2nd**
2026	NASCAR Canada Series	MBS Motorsports	3	0	2	2	115	28th
2026	ARCA Menards Series West	NDS Motorsports	1	0	1	1	42	45th
2026	ARCA Menards Series	RAFA Racing Team	3	0	0	1	96	45th

=== NASCAR ===
(key) (Bold – Pole position awarded by qualifying time. Italics – Pole position earned by points standings or practice time. * – Most laps led. ** – All laps led.)

==== Canada Series ====
NASCAR Canada Series results
Year	Team	No.	Make	1	2	3	4	5	6	7	8	9	10	11	12	13	14	NCSC	Pts	Ref
2022	22 Racing	22	Chevy	SUN	MSP	ACD	AVE	TOR	EDM	SAS; 4	SAS; 12	CTR	OSK	ICAR	MSP	DEL; 16		27th	100	
2023	22 Racing	22	Chevy	SUN; 18	MSP	ACD	AVE	TOR; 12	EIR	SAS	SAS	CTR	OSK	OSK; 2	ICAR	MSP; 10	**DEL**; 21	19th	159	
2024	22 Racing	22	Chevy	MSP	ACD	AVE	RIS	RIS	OSK; 4	SAS	EIR	CTR	ICAR	MSP; 3	DEL; 4	AMS		21st	121	
2025	MBS Motorsports	22	Chevy	**MSP**; 27	RIS	EDM	SAS	CMP	ACD	CTR; 12	ICAR	MSP; 7	DEL	DEL	AMS			27th	87	
2026	MBS Motorsports	22	Chevy	MSP; 3	ACD	ACD	RIS	AMS	AMS	CMP	EIR	EIR	CTR	MAR	ICAR	**MSP**; 11	DEL; 5	28th	115	

=== ARCA Menards Series ===
(key) (Bold – Pole position awarded by qualifying time. Italics – Pole position earned by points standings or practice time. * – Most laps led. ** – All laps led.)

ARCA Menards Series results
Year	Team	No.	Make	1	2	3	4	5	6	7	8	9	10	11	12	13	14	15	16	17	18	19	20	AMSC	Pts	Ref
2025	Rette Jones Racing	29	Ford	DAY; 32	PHO	TAL	KAN	CLT	MCH	BLN	ELK	LRP	DOV	IRP	IOW	GLN	ISF	MAD	DSF	BRI	SLM	KAN	TOL	138th	12	
2026	RAFA Racing Team	2	Toyota	DAY	PHO	KAN	TAL	GLN; 15	TOL	MCH; 11	POC	BER	ELK	CHI; 10	LRP	IRP	IOW	ISF	MAD	DSF	SLM	BRI	KAN	45th	96	

==== ARCA Menards Series West ====
ARCA Menards Series West results
Year	Team	No.	Make	1	2	3	4	5	6	7	8	9	10	11	12	13	AMSWC	Pts	Ref
2026	NDS Motorsports	53	Chevy	KER	PHO	TUC	SHA	CNS	TRI	SON	PIR; 2	AAS	MAD	LVS	PHO	KER	45th	42	

=== CARS Pro Late Model Tour ===
(key)

CARS Pro Late Model Tour results
Year	Team	No.	Make	1	2	3	4	5	6	7	8	9	10	11	12	13	CPLMTC	Pts	Ref
2024	22 Racing	22	Chevy	SNM	HCY; 10	OCS	ACE	TCM	CRW	HCY	NWS	ACE	FLC	SBO	TCM	NWS	N/A	0	

=== ASA STARS National Tour ===
(key) (Bold – Pole position awarded by qualifying time. Italics – Pole position earned by points standings or practice time. * – Most laps led. ** – All laps led.)

ASA STARS National Tour results
Year	Team	No.	Make	1	2	3	4	5	6	7	8	9	10	11	12	ASNTC	Pts	Ref
2024	Rette Jones Racing	30	Ford	NSM; 8	FIF; 19	HCY; 20	MAD; 6	MLW; 11	AND; 1*	OWO; 6	TOL; 6	WIN; 3	NSV; 12			2nd	573	
2025	Rette Jones Racing	30	Ford	NSM; 31	FIF; 7	DOM; 13	HCY; 15	NPS; 10	MAD; 20	SLG; 13			TOL; 14	WIN; 7		6th	564	
2025	Rette Jones Racing	30S	Ford								AND; 3	**OWO**; 8*			NSV; 22	6th	564	
2026	Wilson Motorsports	22S	Toyota	**NSM**; 13	FIF; 2	HCY; 3	SLG; 5	MAD; 1	NPS; 7	OWO; 2	TRI; 22	WIN; 7	NSV; 5	NSM; 12		2nd	679	
