= 2023 NASCAR Pinty's Series =

17th season of the NASCAR Pinty's Series

The 2023 NASCAR Pinty's Series was the seventeenth season of the Pinty's Series, the national stock car racing series in Canada sanctioned by NASCAR. The season began with a race at Sunset Speedway on May 13 and concluded with the race at Delaware Speedway on September 24.

Treyten Lapcevich won his first Pinty's Series championship after winning seven races during the season. Marc-Antoine Camirand, who entered the season as the defending champion, finished second in the final standings behind Lapcevich. Alex Tagliani finished third in the championship.

Treyten Lapcevich is the younger brother of Cayden Lapcevich, the 2016 NASCAR Pinty's Series champion. After Treyten's championship in 2023, they became the first brothers to both win Pinty's Series championships.

This was also the last season of the series with the NASCAR Pinty's Series name as NASCAR decided to move to a premier partner title sponsorship model for its Canadian Series, with the series' new name being the NASCAR Canada Series with Pinty's staying on as a premier partner along with Evirum becoming another premier partner.

== Teams and drivers ==
=== Complete schedule ===
Manufacturer	Team	No.	Driver	Crew chief
Chevrolet	Team 3 Red/Ed Hakonson Racing	3	Alex Guenette	Jason Hathaway
Chevrolet	Team 3 Red/Ed Hakonson Racing	92	Dexter Stacey	Craig Masters
Chevrolet	Paille Racing Team	96	Marc-Antoine Camirand	Robin McCluskey
Chevrolet	Wight Motorsports	0	Glenn Styres	Jim Ireland 5 Doug Brown 9
Chevrolet	Wight Motorsports	27	Andrew Ranger	Jeff Wilcox
Chevrolet	22 Racing	18	Alex Tagliani	Terry Simpson
Chevrolet	22 Racing	20	Treyten Lapcevich	Jeff Lapcevich
Dodge	DJK Racing	17	D. J. Kennington	Rick Verberne
Dodge	Dumoulin Compétition	47	Louis-Philippe Dumoulin	Benoit Laganiere
Dodge	Lacroix Motorsport	74	Kevin Lacroix	Don Thomson Jr.
Dodge	Larry Jackson Racing	84	Larry Jackson	Howie Scannell Jr. 5 David Stephens 9
Ford	Jacombs Racing	1	Jean-Philippe Bergeron	Ron Easton
Ford	Jacombs Racing	24	Thomas Nepveu (R) 13	Ray McCaughey
Ford	Jacombs Racing	24	Alex Labbé 1	Ray McCaughey

=== Limited schedule ===
Manufacturer	Team	No.	Driver	Crew chief	Round(s)
Chevrolet	Team 3 Red/Ed Hakonson Racing	66	Wallace Stacey	Ben Carswell 5 Gary Mead 3	8
Chevrolet	Groupe Theetge	80	Donald Theetge (R)	Martin Roy	8
Chevrolet	ICAR Canada Racing Team	03	Justin Arseneau	Joe Cote	2
Chevrolet	Guenette Racing	93	Jacques Guenette Sr.	Sylvain Gagnon	1
Chevrolet	Jean-Frédéric Laberge	91	Jean-Frédéric Laberge	James Ireland	4
Chevrolet	JF77 Racing	77	Jocelyn Fecteau	Eric-Pierre Martel	2
Chevrolet	Jim Bray Motorsports	98	Malcolm Strachan	Mike Knott 2 Unknown 2 Don Barnhart 2	6
Chevrolet	Jim Bray Motorsports	98	Darryl Timmers	Brandon Mitic	3
Chevrolet	Jim Bray Motorsports	98	John Fletcher	Brandon Mitic	1
Chevrolet	Josh Collins Racing	23	Brandon Mcfarlane	Glen Mcfarlane	3
Chevrolet	Josh Collins Racing	56	Josh Collins	Carl Neary	3
Chevrolet	Krzysik Racing	46	Jamie Krzysik	Louis Krzysik	3
Chevrolet	Wight Motorsports	9	Brandon Watson	Rino Montanari	13
Chevrolet	MBS Motorsports	31	Daniel Bois	Brian Ellas	8
Chevrolet	Paille Racing Team	01	David Hébert	Kevin Ether	2
Chevrolet	Paille Racing Team	87	Sam Fellows	Unknown 1 Mike Knott 4	5
Chevrolet	Promotive Racing	67	David Thorndyke	Adam Thorndyke	1
Chevrolet	Wight Motorsports	19	Stewart Friesen	Andrew Reaume	2
Chevrolet	Wight Motorsports	19	Jesse Kennedy	Jamie Hartley	1
Chevrolet	22 Racing	22	Kyle Steckly	Scott Steckly 3 Peter Shepherd II 2	5 (Note: Ken Schrader was scheduled to run the 2nd race at Ohsweken Speedway (race #11) but since the race was postponed one day due to rain, Schrader had a scheduling conflict with SRX Series race so he was replaced in the race #11 at Ohsweken by Kyle Steckly.)
Chevrolet	22 Racing	22	Ken Schrader	Kyle Steckly	2
Dodge	Coursol Performance	54	Dave Coursol	Andre Coursol	2
Dodge	Brent Wheller Motorsports	61	Brent Wheller	Kevin Gallant	1
Dodge	Busch Racing	43	Shantel Kalika	Ben Busch	3
Dodge	DJK Racing	06	Sara Thorne	Rob McConnell	1
Dodge	DJK Racing	11	Wayne Hanlon Jr.	TBA	1 (Note: Entry was fielded in collaboration with Hanlon Motorsports.)
Dodge	DJK Racing	11	Amber Balcaen	Donald Teinhardt	1
Dodge	DJK Racing	28	Matthew Shirley	TBA	3
Dodge	DJK Racing	88	Simon Charbonneau	TBA	1
Dodge	Dumoulin Compétition	04	Jean-François Dumoulin	Richard Dumoulin	1
Dodge	Duroking Autosport	12	Mathieu Kingsbury	TBA	1
Dodge	Duroking Autosport	12	Raphaël Lessard	Jean-Pierre Cyr	2
Dodge	Herby Motorsports	53	Herby Drescher	Vick Decker 2 Martin Goulet 2 Anna Romatowska 1	5
Dodge	Herby Motorsports	75	Benoit Couture	Vick Decker	1
Dodge	Kasey Jones Racing	30	Noah Gragson	Jim Ireland	1
Dodge	Legendary Motorcar Company	6	Peter Klutt	Nick Sheridan 1 Jason Humphries 2	3
Dodge	Legendary Motorcar Company	42	Ryan Klutt	Jason Humphries 1 Nick Sheridan 1	2
Dodge	Legendary Motorcar Company	59	Gary Klutt	John Fletcher	4
Dodge	Monaghan Motorsports	4	Trevor Monaghan	Rob McConnell	4
Dodge	Lacroix Motorsport	55	Serge Bourdeau	Yannick Bourdeau	3
Dodge 1 Chevrolet 2	Dumoulin Compétition	13	Jean-François Dumoulin	Richard Dumoulin	1
Dodge 1 Chevrolet 2	Dumoulin Compétition	13	Louis-Philippe Montour	Dany Emond	3
Chevrolet 3 Ford 2	Jacombs Racing	36	Alex Labbé	Marc Beaudoin	3
Chevrolet 3 Ford 2	Jacombs Racing	36	Dave Bailey	Bob Slack	2
Ford 2 Chevrolet 2	RGR Motorsports	38	Mike Goudie	Ryan Goudie	4
Dodge 4 Ford 2	Larry Jackson Racing	99	Matthew Scannell	Howie Scannell Jr.	3
Dodge 4 Ford 2	Larry Jackson Racing	99	Owen Groves	Howie Scannell Jr.	1
Dodge 4 Ford 2	Larry Jackson Racing	99	Aaron Turkey	Howie Scannell Jr.	2

== Schedule ==
On 17 January 2023, NASCAR announced the 2023 schedule. It will be the first season in history to run 14 races. It includes an additional race at Ohsweken Speedway.

No.	Race title	Track	Location	Date
1	NTN Ultimate Bearing Experience 250	Sunset Speedway	Innisfil	13 May
2	Ebay Motors 200	Canadian Tire Motorsport Park	Bowmanville, Ontario	21 May
3	Bud Light 300	Autodrome Chaudière	Vallée-Jonction	10 June
4	Proline 250 Presented by NL Chevrolet Dealers	Eastbound International Speedway	Avondale, Newfoundland and Labrador	24 June
5	Tiffany Gate Grand Prix of Toronto	Exhibition Place	Toronto	14 July
6	Bayer 300	Edmonton International Raceway	Wetaskiwin	22 July
7	Leland Industries Twin 125's	Sutherland Automotive Speedway	Saskatoon	26 July
8	Leland Industries Twin 125's	Sutherland Automotive Speedway	Saskatoon	26 July
9	Les 60 Tours Rousseau Metal Presented by Groupe Olivier & Prolon Controls	Circuit Trois-Rivières	Trois-Rivières	6 August
10	Freshtone Dirt Classic	Ohsweken Speedway	Ohsweken	14 August
11	The Pinty's 100	Ohsweken Speedway	Ohsweken	16 August (Note: The Pinty's 100 was originally scheduled for August 15, but was postponed one day due to rain.)
12	Evirum 125	Circuit ICAR	Mirabel, Quebec	26 August
13	WeatherTech 200	Canadian Tire Motorsport Park	Bowmanville, Ontario	3 September
14	Pintys Fall Brawl	Delaware Speedway	Delaware, Ontario	24 September

== Results and standings ==
=== Races ===
No.	Race	Pole position	Most laps led	Winning driver	Manufacturer
1	NTN Ultimate Bearing Experience 250	Treyten Lapcevich	Treyten Lapcevich	Treyten Lapcevich	Chevrolet
2	Ebay Motors 200	Marc-Antoine Camirand	Gary Klutt	Treyten Lapcevich	Chevrolet
3	Bud Light 300	Treyten Lapcevich	Treyten Lapcevich	Marc-Antoine Camirand	Chevrolet
4	Proline 250 Presented by NL Chevrolet Dealers	Donald Theetge	Kevin Lacroix	Treyten Lapcevich	Chevrolet
5	Tiffany Gate Grand Prix of Toronto	Alex Tagliani	Alex Tagliani	Alex Tagliani	Chevrolet
6	Bayer 300	Marc-Antoine Camirand	Marc-Antoine Camirand	Marc-Antoine Camirand	Chevrolet
7	Leland Industries Twin 125s Race 1	Treyten Lapcevich	Treyten Lapcevich	Treyten Lapcevich	Chevrolet
8	Leland Industries Twin 125s Race 2	Donald Theetge	Treyten Lapcevich	Treyten Lapcevich	Chevrolet
9	Les 60 Tours Rousseau Metal	Marc-Antoine Camirand	Marc-Antoine Camirand	Marc-Antoine Camirand	Chevrolet
10	Freshstone Dirt Classic	Ken Schrader	Treyten Lapcevich	Ken Schrader	Chevrolet
11	Pinty's 100	Treyten Lapcevich	Treyten Lapcevich	Treyten Lapcevich	Chevrolet
12	Evirum 125	Marc-Antoine Camirand	Alex Tagliani	Marc-Antoine Camirand	Chevrolet
13	WeatherTech 200	Louis-Philippe Dumoulin	Alex Labbé	Kevin Lacroix	Dodge
14	Pinty's Fall Brawl	Kyle Steckly	Treyten Lapcevich	Treyten Lapcevich	Chevrolet

=== Drivers' championship ===
(key) Bold – Pole position awarded by time. Italics – Pole position set by final practice results or Owners' points. ^{L} –Led race lap (1 point). * – Led most race laps (1 point). (R) - Rookie of the Year candidate.

Pos.	Driver	SUN	MSP	ACD	AVE	TOR	EDM	SAS	SAS	CTR	OSK	OSK	ICAR	MSP	DEL	Points
1	Treyten Lapcevich	**1**^{L}*	1^{L}	**2**^{L}*	1^{L}	6	2	**1**^{L}*	1^{L}*	6^{L}	4^{L}*	**1**^{L}*	4	6^{L}	1^{L}*	612
2	Marc-Antoine Camirand	4	2^{L}	1^{L}	3	3	**1**^{L}*	3	5	**1**^{L}*	5	13	**1**^{L}	3^{L}	22	551
3	Alex Tagliani	19	6	7	6	**1**^{L}*	5	4	2^{L}	3^{L}	10^{L}	15	3^{L}*	8^{L}	13	524
4	Louis-Philippe Dumoulin	7	5^{L}	5	8	4	3	18	3	2^{L}	16	6	5	**2**^{L}	14	520
5	Kevin Lacroix	3	4^{L}	4	5^{L}*	2	4	9	9	30	2	9	22	1^{L}	5	514
6	D. J. Kennington	6	8	6	19	9	17	10	12	5	3	5	10	4	3^{L}	500
7	Alex Guenette	2^{L}	7	10	4	8	18	5	6	8	9	11	19	12	6	493
8	Jean-Philippe Bergeron	8	10	13	10	7	9	13	17	9	14	4	9	14	8	471
9	Larry Jackson	9	13	9	7	13	11	15	13	11	19	8	13	11^{L}	11	453
10	Andrew Ranger	17	18	20	17^{L}	5^{L}	15	6	10	29	11	3	6	23^{L}	4	435
11	Dexter Stacey	12	9	3	9	24	16	8	7	26	17	12	11	27	9	428
12	Brandon Watson	10	21	8	16^{L}	19	8	7	4	7	15	23		13	18	404
13	Thomas Nepveu **(R)**	20	25	14		18	7	11	8	10	8	18	24	22	7	380
14	Glenn Styres	21	20	21	14	21	13	16	18	17	24	10	25	20	20	356
15	Donald Theetge	5		19	**20**^{L}		6	2	**11**	20					2	269
16	Daniel Bois **(R)**	14	11			25				21	7	17	8	7		242
17	Wallace Stacey	16	16	17							22	21	18	25	12	205
18	Malcolm Strachan	13	12	12	21						18	14				174
19	Kyle Steckly **(R)**	18				12						2^{L}		10	**21**^{L}	159
20	Sam Fellows			11		16				15			12	17		149
21	Alex Labbé				2					23^{L}			2	5^{L}*		147
22	Herby Drescher **(R)**		19			15				16			15	16		139
23	Gary Klutt		3^{L}*			23				4^{L}				24		125
24	Trevor Monaghan					17					21	19			15	104
25	Matthew Shirley **(R)**						10	12	15							95
26	Brandon McFarlane **(R)**	11		15	13											93
27	Matthew Scannell		14			10								19		89
28	Jamie Krzysik						12	17	14							89
29	Shantel Kalika						14	14	16							88
30	Josh Collins **(R)**	15		18	12											87
31	Darryl Timmers **(R)**					14				12				21		85
32	Jean-Frédéric Laberge					20				27			20	30		79
33	Peter Klutt		23			22								15		72
34	Serge Bourdeau **(R)**					26				19			17			70
35	Mike Goudie **(R)**		22								23	Wth		18		69
36	David Hébert **(R)**										13	7				68
37	Justin Arseneau **(R)**									14			7			67
38	Ryan Klutt		17											9		62
39	Dave Coursol									13			14			61
40	Stewart Friesen										6	22				60
41	Dave Bailey **(R)**										12	16				60
42	Louis-Philippe Montour **(R)**									24^{L}			23	26		60
43	Jean-François Dumoulin					11				28						49
44	Jocelyn Fecteau		15							25						48
45	Aaron Turkey **(R)**										20	20				48
46	Ken Schrader										**1**^{L}	QL				47
47	Raphaël Lessard									22			21			45
48	Noah Gragson														10	34
49	Sara Thorne **(R)**				11											33
50	Wayne Hanlon Jr. **(R)**				15											29
51	Mathieu Kingsbury			16												28
52	Jacques Guenette Sr. **(R)**												16			28
53	John Fletcher														16	28
54	Amber Balcaen														17	27
55	Owen Groves **(R)**				18											26
56	Benoit Couture **(R)**									18						26
57	Jesse Kennedy **(R)**														19	25
58	Simon Charbonneau **(R)**		24													20
59	David Thorndyke													28		16
60	Brent Wheller													29		15

== See also ==
- 2023 NASCAR Cup Series
- 2023 NASCAR Xfinity Series
- 2023 NASCAR Craftsman Truck Series
- 2023 ARCA Menards Series
- 2023 ARCA Menards Series East
- 2023 ARCA Menards Series West
- 2023 NASCAR Whelen Modified Tour
- 2023 NASCAR Mexico Series
- 2023 NASCAR Whelen Euro Series
- 2023 NASCAR Brasil Sprint Race
- 2023 SRX Series
- 2023 CARS Tour
- 2023 SMART Modified Tour
