= 2024 NASCAR Canada Series =

18th season of the NASCAR Canada Series

The 2024 NASCAR Canada Series was the eighteenth season of the Canada Series, the national stock car racing series in Canada sanctioned by NASCAR. The season began with a race at Canadian Tire Motorsport Park on May 19 and concluded with the race at Autodrome Montmagny Speedway on September 22. This was the series' first season as the rebranded NASCAR Canada Series, with Pinty's Delicious Foods Inc. sharing presenting rights with Evirum.

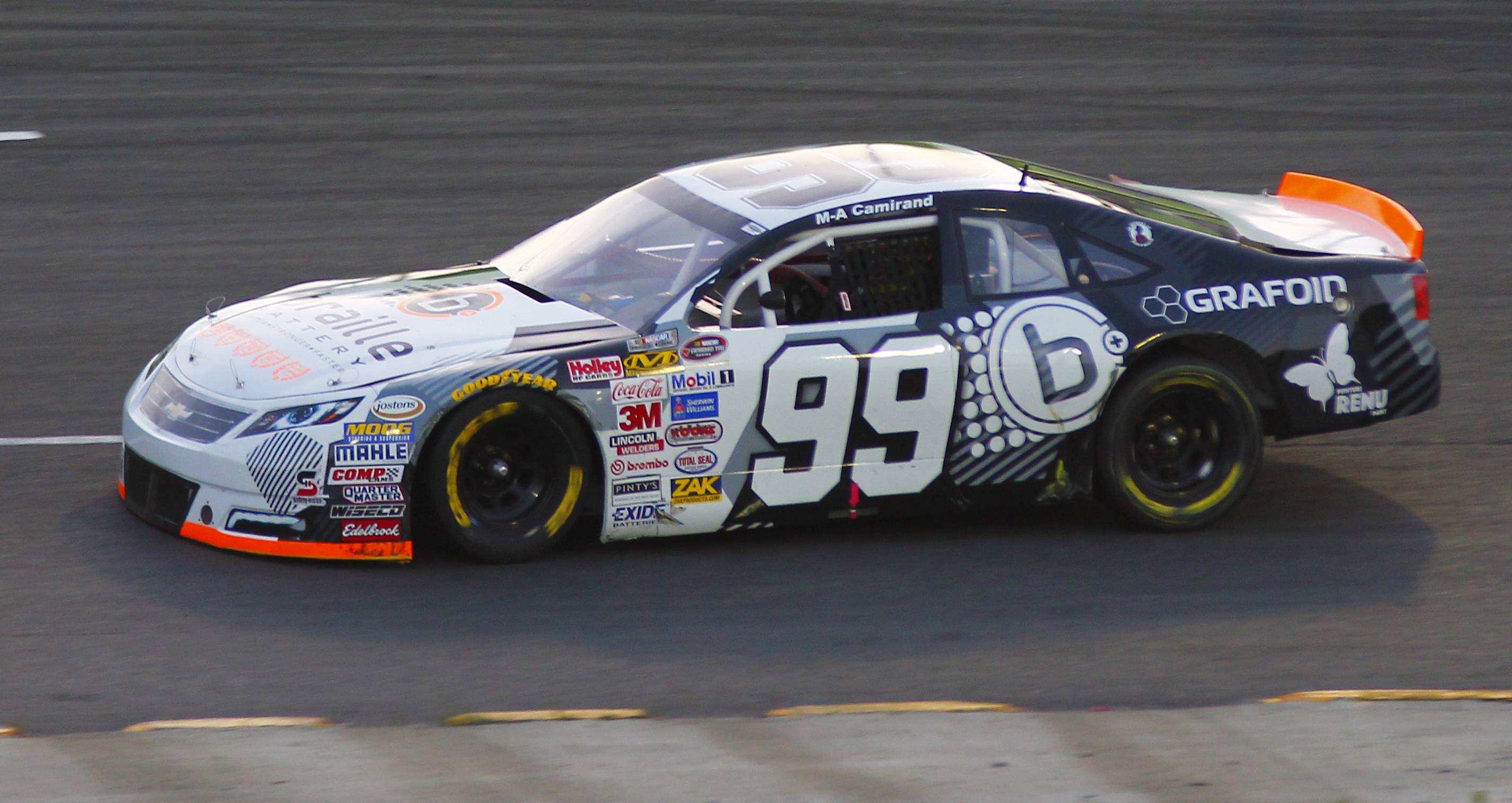
Marc-Antoine Camirand won his second championship after winning four races during the season.

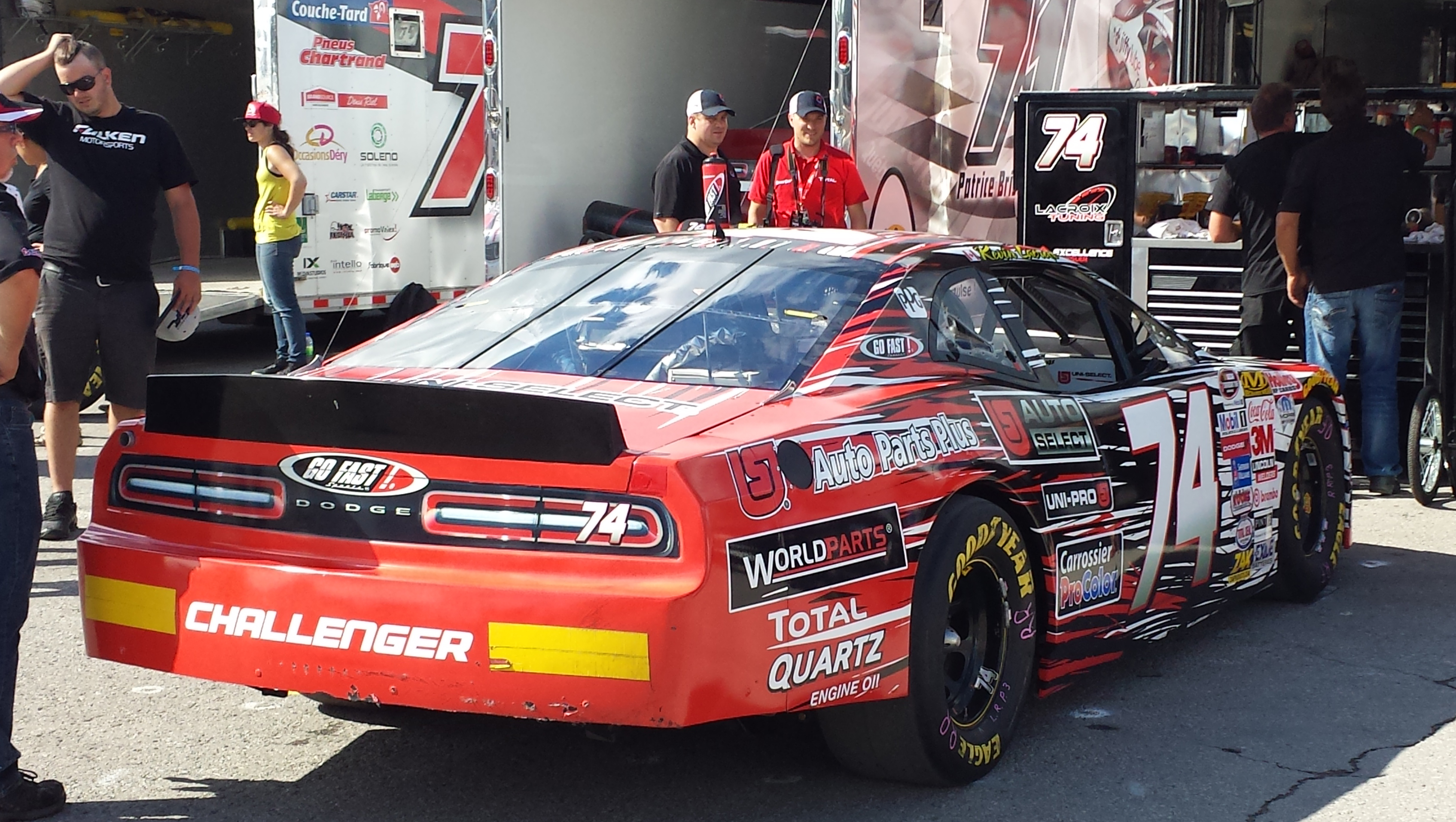
Kevin Lacroix finished 2nd in the championship standings.

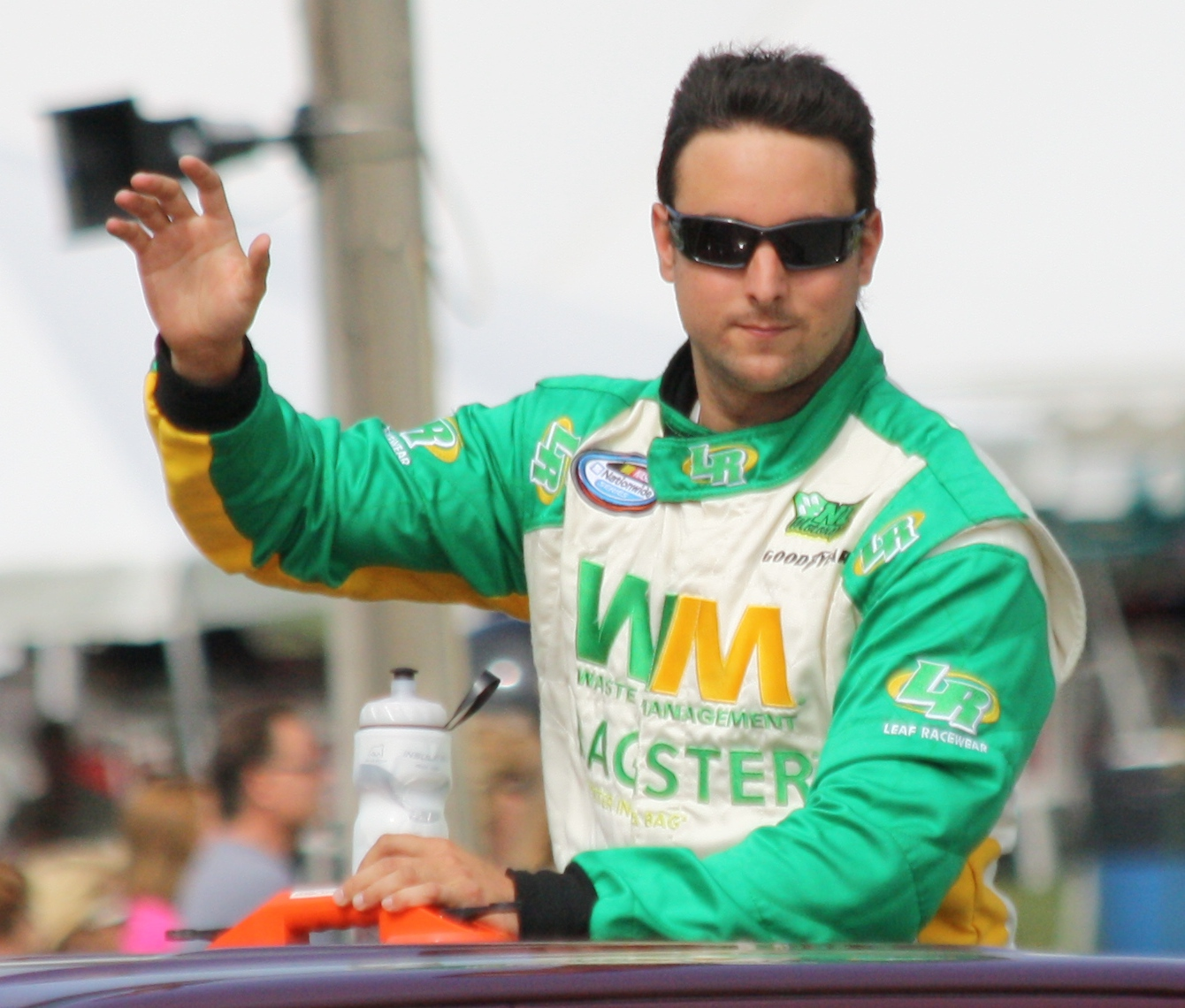
Andrew Ranger finished 3rd in the championship standings.

== Schedule ==
On 21 November 2023, NASCAR announced the 2024 schedule. It ran 13 races across 6 provinces.

No.	Race title	Track	Location	Date
1	ASSA ABLOY Accentra 200	Canadian Tire Motorsport Park	Bowmanville, Ontario	19 May
2	Bud Light 300	Autodrome Chaudière	Vallée-Jonction	1 June
3	PRO•LINE 250 Presented by NL Chevrolet Dealers	Eastbound International Speedway	Avondale, Newfoundland and Labrador	22 June
4	PRO•LINE 150	Riverside International Speedway	Antigonish	29 June
5	Choko 150	Riverside International Speedway	Antigonish	29 June
6	Freshtone Dirt Classic	Ohsweken Speedway	Ohsweken	11 July
7	Leland Industries 250	Sutherland Automotive Speedway	Saskatoon	20 July
8	NAPA 300	Edmonton International Raceway	Wetaskiwin	27 July
9	Les 60 Tours Rousseau Metal Presented by Groupe Olivier & Prolon Controls	Circuit Trois-Rivières	Trois-Rivières	11 August
10	Evirum 100	Circuit ICAR	Mirabel, Quebec	24 August
11	WeatherTech 200	Canadian Tire Motorsport Park	Bowmanville, Ontario	1 September
12	NASCAR Canada Series 250 (Note: Race was originally scheduled to be held on August 17 but was moved to September 8.)	Delaware Speedway	Delaware, Ontario	8 September
13	XPN 250	Autodrome Montmagny Speedway	Montmagny, Quebec	22 September

== Results and standings ==
=== Races ===
No.	Race	Pole position	Most laps led	Winning driver	Manufacturer	Report
1	ASSA ABLOY Accentra 200	Gary Klutt	Kevin Lacroix	Marc-Antoine Camirand	Chevrolet	Report
2	Bud Light 300	Marc-Antoine Camirand	Kevin Lacroix	Andrew Ranger	Chevrolet	Report
3	PRO•LINE 250	Kevin Lacroix	Kevin Lacroix	Andrew Ranger	Chevrolet	Report
4	PRO•LINE 150	Kevin Lacroix	Kevin Lacroix	Kevin Lacroix	Dodge	Report
5	Choko 150	Alex Labbé	Kevin Lacroix	Kevin Lacroix	Dodge	Report
6	Freshstone Dirt Classic	Chase Briscoe	Marc-Antoine Camirand	Marc-Antoine Camirand	Chevrolet	Report
7	Leland Industries 250	Marc-Antoine Camirand	Marc-Antoine Camirand	Marc-Antoine Camirand	Chevrolet	Report
8	NAPA 300	Kevin Lacroix	Kevin Lacroix	Kevin Lacroix	Dodge	Report
9	Les 60 Tours Rousseau Metal Presented by Groupe Olivier & Prolon Controls	Marc-Antoine Camirand	Marc-Antoine Camirand	Marc-Antoine Camirand	Chevrolet	Report
10	Evirum 100	Andrew Ranger	Kevin Lacroix	Andrew Ranger	Chevrolet	Report
11	WeatherTech 200	Kevin Lacroix	Kevin Lacroix	Kevin Lacroix	Dodge	Report
12	NASCAR Canada Series 250	Kevin Lacroix	Kevin Lacroix	Kevin Lacroix	Dodge	Report
13	XPN 250	Alex Labbé	Kevin Lacroix	Kevin Lacroix	Dodge	Report

== Footnotes ==
=== Drivers' championship ===
(key) Bold – Pole position awarded by time. Italics – Pole position set by final practice results, Owners' points, or heat race. ^{L} –Led race lap (1 point). * – Led most race laps (1 point). (R) - Rookie of the Year candidate.

Pos.	Driver	MSP	ACD	AVE	RIS	RIS	OSK	SAS	EIR	CTR	ICAR	MSP	DEL	AMS	Points
1	Marc-Antoine Camirand	1^{L}	**3**^{L}	3^{L}	7	11	1^{L}*	**1**^{L}*	2	**1**^{L}*	3	2^{L}*	6	6	548
2	Kevin Lacroix	28^{L*}	2^{L}*	**2**^{L}	**1**^{L}*	1^{L}*	7	2^{L}	**1**^{L}*	23^{L}	2^{L}*	**1**^{L}	**1**^{L}*	1^{L}*	538
3	Andrew Ranger	8	1^{L}	1^{L}*	6	8	2^{L}	3^{L}	7^{L}	14	**1**^{L}	4	2^{L}	19	513
4	D.J. Kennington	6	6	7	14	5	11	6	5	5	11	5	3	9	479
5	L.P. Dumoulin	3^{L}	4	5	8	4	12	4	10	4^{L}	23	23	5	8	461
6	Jason Hathaway	12	7	6	2^{L}	2^{L}	14	5	11	21	12	26	7	16	433
7	Larry Jackson	17	18	9	9	9	15	9	9	6		11	10	14	392
8	Glenn Styres	19	16	11	13	15	18	8	12	26	14	14	12	23	372
9	Donald Theetge		5	4	12	12	10	7	4	8			15	5	358
10	Thomas Nepveu	27	12	12	4	18	16	12	8	22	7				302
11	Alex Labbé	5	19		5	**7**				2	5	22		**7**^{L}	281
12	Steve Côté **(R)**	13	13				8			9	20	7	8	17	257
13	Alex Guenette		17		3	3				20	4			3	214
14	J. P. Bergeron	7	10							27	19	6		11	184
15	Danny Chisholm **(R)**	21			18	19			3				9		150
16	Simon Dion-Viens		9							7	9			13	138
17	Daniel Bois	22					9			30	8	16			135
18	Alex Tagliani	10								18^{L}	6	9			134
19	Maxime Gauvreau **(R)**		11		17	6								12	130
20	Dexter Stacey	25	8								16	27		21	123
21	Kyle Steckly						4					3	4		121
22	Dave Coursol		14							15	10			20	117
23	Frederik Ladouceur **(R)**									19	13		14	15	115
24	Bryan Cathcart			10	19	17	17								113
25	Sam Fellows	4								28	15	21			108
26	Domenic Scrivo **(R)**	18								13	24	18			103
27	Brandon McFarlane **(R)**			8	11	13									100
28	Raphaël Lessard		20							3				10	99
29	Mathieu Kingsbury		15	15										4	98
30	Simon Charbonneau **(R)**	23								25	21	13			94
31	Josh Collins			13	10	16									93
32	Sara Thorne **(R)**			14	15	10									93
33	Louis-Philippe Montour	9								24		12			87
34	Mark Dilley				16	14		14							87
35	Serge Bourdeau **(R)**									12	17	19			84
36	Gary Klutt	**2**^{L}									8				79
37	Benoit Couture **(R)**	24								16		20			72
38	Herby Drescher **(R)**	15								17	18				70
39	Cayden Lapcevich						6						13		69
40	Jamie Krzysik							13	6						69
41	Ryan Klutt	11										10			67
42	Will Larue **(R)**		21											2	65
43	Brent Wheller												11	18	59
44	Peter Klutt	14^{L}										17			58
45	Matthew Scannell	26										15			47
46	David Thorndyke	20										25			43
47	Ken Schrader						3								41
48	Chase Briscoe						5^{L}								40
49	Wallace Stacey	29	22												37
50	Justin Arseneau **(R)**									31	22				35
51	Shantel Kalika							10							34
52	Jocelyn Fecteau									10					34
53	J. F. Dumoulin									11^{L}					34
54	Michael Goudie	30										24			34
55	Matthew Shirley **(R)**							11							33
56	Trevor Monaghan						13								31
57	Darryl Timmers **(R)**									29		28			31
58	Malcolm Strachan	16													28
59	Ryan Dyson **(R)**												16		28
60	Amber Balcaen						19								25
61	Martin Goulet Jr. **(R)**													22	22

== See also ==
- 2024 NASCAR Cup Series
- 2024 NASCAR Xfinity Series
- 2024 NASCAR Craftsman Truck Series
- 2024 ARCA Menards Series
- 2024 ARCA Menards Series East
- 2024 ARCA Menards Series West
- 2024 NASCAR Whelen Modified Tour
- 2024 NASCAR Mexico Series
- 2024 NASCAR Whelen Euro Series
- 2024 NASCAR Brasil Sprint Race
- 2024 CARS Tour
- 2024 SMART Modified Tour
