= 2025 NASCAR Canada Series =

19th season of the NASCAR Canada Series

The 2025 NASCAR Canada Series was the nineteenth season of the Canada Series, the national stock car racing series in Canada sanctioned by NASCAR. The season began on May 18 with the Clarington 200 at Canadian Tire Motorsport Park and finished with the XPN 250 at Autodrome Montmagny Speedway on September 21.

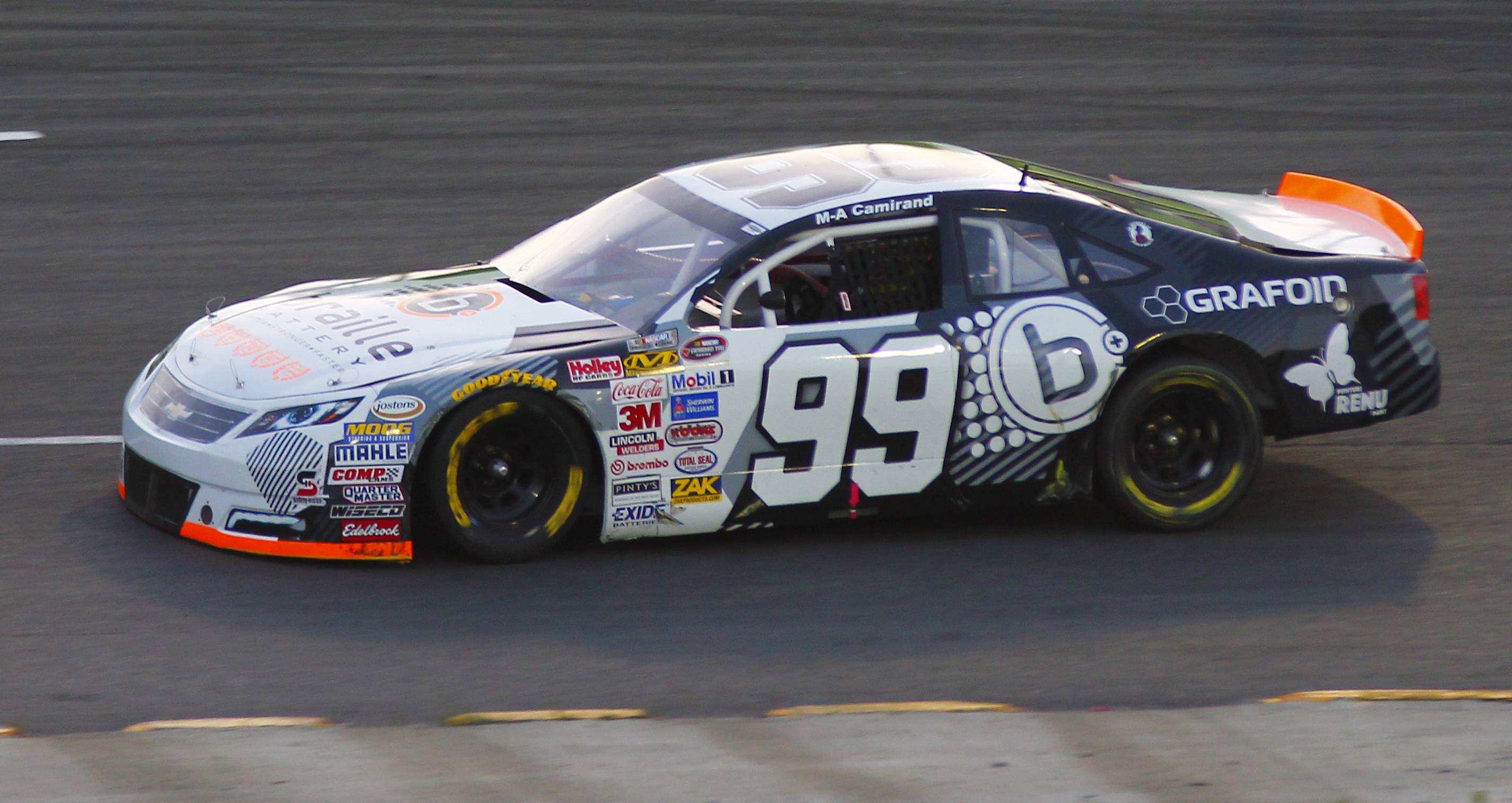
Marc-Antoine Camirand, pictured in 2015, won his third championship after winning five races during the season.

Marc-Antoine Camirand entered the season as the defending champion. In winning the 2025 championship, he became the first back to back champion in series history.

== Teams and drivers ==
=== Complete schedule ===
Manufacturer	Team	No.	Driver	Ref
Chevrolet	Ed Hakonson Racing	3	(Canada) Jason Hathaway 4	
Chevrolet	Ed Hakonson Racing	3	(Canada) Connor Bell (R) 2	
Chevrolet	Ed Hakonson Racing	3	(Canada) Dexter Stacey 1	
Chevrolet	Ed Hakonson Racing	3	(Canada) Alexandre Fortin (R) 1	
Chevrolet	Ed Hakonson Racing	3	(Canada) Justin Arseneau (R) 1	
Chevrolet	Ed Hakonson Racing	3	(Canada) Connor Pritiko (R) 2	
Chevrolet	Ed Hakonson Racing	3	(Canada) Frédérik Ladouceur (R) 1	
Chevrolet	Group Theetge	80	(Canada) Alex Tagliani 5	
Chevrolet	Group Theetge	80	(Canada) Donald Theetge 7	
Chevrolet	Innovation Auto Sport	9	(Canada) Mathieu Kingsbury	
Chevrolet	Innovation Auto Sport	74	(Canada) Kevin Lacroix	
Chevrolet	Paillé Course//Racing	27	(Canada) Andrew Ranger	
Chevrolet	Paillé Course//Racing	96	(Canada) Marc-Antoine Camirand	
Dodge	DJK Racing	17	(Canada) D. J. Kennington	
Dodge	Dumoulin Compétition	47	(Canada) L. P. Dumoulin	

=== Partial schedule ===
Manufacturer	Team	No.	Driver	Rounds	Ref
Chevrolet	BCM Motorsports	55	(Canada) Serge Bourdeau	7–9	
Chevrolet	BCM Motorsports	75	(Canada) Benoit Couture	5, 7, 9	
Chevrolet	Dumoulin Compétition	50	(Italy) Vittorio Ghirelli	7	
Chevrolet	Dumoulin Compétition	50	(Canada) Sam Charland	12	
Chevrolet	Ed Hakonson Racing	7	(Canada) Raphaël Lessard	7	
Chevrolet	Ed Hakonson Racing	8	(Canada) Danny Chisholm (R)	1	
Chevrolet	Ed Hakonson Racing	8	(Canada) Sara Thorne	2	
Chevrolet	Ed Hakonson Racing	92	(Canada) Dexter Stacey	7, 9	
Chevrolet	Eighty8 Racing	88	(Canada) Simon Charbonneau (R)	1, 5, 7–9	
Chevrolet	Fellows McGraw Racing	87	(Canada) Sam Fellows	1, 5, 7–9	
Chevrolet	Glenn Styres Racing	0	(Canada) Glenn Styres	1, 9, 12	
Chevrolet	Goulet Motorsports	83	(Canada) Martin Goulet Jr.	7, 12	
Chevrolet	Group Theetge	73	(Canada) Donald Theetge	7	
Chevrolet	Group Theetge	73	(Canada) Marc-André Lachapelle	8	
Chevrolet	JASS Racing	39	(Canada) Alex Guenette	1, 5–9, 12	
Chevrolet	JASS Racing	93	(Canada) Jacques Guenette Sr.	5, 8–9	
Chevrolet	Larue Motorsports	45	(Canada) Will Larue	2, 6, 12	
Chevrolet	Legendary Motorcar Company	42	(Canada) Ryan Klutt	1, 9	
Chevrolet	LL Motorsports	36	(Canada) Alex Labbé	6–8, 12	
Chevrolet	MBS Motorsports	22	(Canada) Kyle Steckly	1, 7, 9	
Chevrolet	MBS Motorsports	69	(Canada) Domenic Scrivo (R)	1, 5, 7–12	
Chevrolet	MRN Racing Inc.	10	(Canada) Rob Naismith	4	
Chevrolet	Promotive Racing	67	(Canada) David Thorndyke	1	
Chevrolet	Todd Musker Racing	00	(Canada) Todd Musker	5	
Chevrolet	Tomlinson Motorsports	48	(Canada) Ron Tomlinson	5	
Chevrolet	Tomlinson Motorsports	48	(Canada) Trevor Hill (R)	9	
Dodge	Bray Autosport	81	(Canada) Brent Wheller	1, 5, 9–11	
Dodge	DJK Racing	28	(United States) Ryan Vargas	1–7, 10–11	
Dodge	DJK Racing	46	(Canada) Matthew Shirley	3–4, 12	
Dodge	Dumoulin Compétition	04	(Canada) Christopher Bedard	12	
Dodge	Dumoulin Compétition	04	(Canada) Jean-François Dumoulin	6–7	
Dodge	Dumoulin Compétition	04	(Canada) Bryan Cathcart	2	
Dodge	Equipe de Course	97	(Canada) Maxime Gauvreau	6, 12	
Dodge	Kasey Cash Racing	30	(Canada) Jonathan Aarts	10–11	
Dodge	Larry Jackson Racing	84	(Canada) Darryl Timmers (R)	1	
Dodge	Larry Jackson Racing	84	(Canada) Larry Jackson	1–2, 5–12	
Dodge	Larry Jackson Racing	85	(Canada) Larry Jackson	1	
Dodge	Larry Jackson Racing	85	(Canada) Darryl Timmers (R)	7, 9	
Dodge	Larry Jackson Racing	99	(Canada) Matthew Scannell	1, 9	
Dodge	Legendary Motorcar Company	6	(Canada) Peter Klutt	1, 9	
Dodge	Legendary Motorcar Company	59	(Canada) Gary Klutt	1, 5, 7, 10	
Dodge	Powersports Garage	14	(Canada) Geoff Johnson	5	
Dodge	SDV Autosport	37	(Canada) Simon Dion-Viens	6–8, 12	
Ford	BC Race Cars	24	(United States) Josh Hurley (R)	1	
Ford	BC Race Cars	24	(Canada) Jeff Cavanagh	5	
Ford	BC Race Cars	24	(Canada) Jack Polito (R)	9	
Ford	Bray Autosport	98	(Canada) Malcolm Strachan	1, 5, 9–11	
Ford	Bray Autosport	98	(Canada) Brent Wheller	2	
Ford	Prolon Racing	1	(Canada) J. P. Bergeron	1, 5, 7–8	
Chevrolet 4 Dodge 1	Coursol Performance	54	(Canada) Dave Coursol	1, 6–8, 12	

=== Driver changes ===
- Ryan Vargas made his Canada Series debut in 2025 and competed part-time in the series in the No. 28 car for DJK Racing, originally announced to be full-time contingent upon the team finding sponsorship for every race. Had he been able to run the full season, he would have been the first American to run full-time in the Canada Series since 2001 as well as the first since NASCAR's acquisition of it in 2007. Vargas ran full-time in the NASCAR Euro Series in 2024 and has also previously competed in the NASCAR Xfinity and Truck Series.

== Schedule ==
On 20 December 2024, NASCAR announced the 2025 schedule, with 12 races across 5 provinces scheduled.

No.	Race title	Track	Location	Date
1	Clarington 200	R Canadian Tire Motorsport Park	Bowmanville, Ontario	18 May
2	NASCAR Canada 300	O Riverside International Speedway	Antigonish, Nova Scotia	28 June
3	NAPA 300	O Edmonton International Raceway	Wetaskiwin, Alberta	12 July
4	Leland Industries 250	O Sutherland Automotive Speedway	Saskatoon, Saskatchewan	16 July
5	Calabogie 150 Clash of the Titans	R Calabogie Motorsports Park	Calabogie, Ontario	27 July
6	Bud Light 250 (Note: Race was originally scheduled to be held on May 31 but was moved to August 2.)	O Autodrome Chaudière	Vallée-Jonction, Quebec	2 August
7	Les 60 Tours Rousseau Métal	R Circuit Trois-Rivières	Trois-Rivières, Quebec	10 August
8	Evirum 100	R Circuit ICAR	Mirabel, Quebec	23 August
9	WeatherTech 200	R Canadian Tire Motorsport Park	Bowmanville, Ontario	31 August
10	APC 125	O Delaware Speedway	Delaware, Ontario	13 September
11	NTN 125 (Note: A second race at Delaware Speedway was added after the cancellation of the Sunset 225.)	O Delaware Speedway	Delaware, Ontario	13 September
12	XPN 250	O Autodrome Montmagny Speedway	Montmagny, Quebec	21 September

== Results and standings ==
=== Races ===
No.	Race	Pole position	Most laps led	Winning driver	Manufacturer	No	Report
1	Clarington 200	Kyle Steckly	Malcolm Strachan	Marc-Antoine Camirand	Chevrolet	96	Report
2	NASCAR Canada 300	D.J. Kennington	D.J. Kennington	D.J. Kennington	Dodge	17	Report
3	NAPA 300	Donald Theetge	Donald Theetge	Marc-Antoine Camirand	Chevrolet	96	Report
4	Leland Industries 250	Kevin Lacroix	Kevin Lacroix	Kevin Lacroix	Chevrolet	74	Report
5	Calabogie 150 Clash of the Titans	Gary Klutt	Marc-Antoine Camirand	Connor Bell	Chevrolet	3	Report
6	Bud Light 250	Donald Theetge	Donald Theetge	Will Larue	Chevrolet	45	Report
7	Les 60 Tours Rousseau Métal	Marc-Antoine Camirand	Andrew Ranger	Andrew Ranger	Chevrolet	27	Report
8	Evirum 100	Andrew Ranger	Marc-Antoine Camirand	Marc-Antoine Camirand	Chevrolet	96	Report
9	WeatherTech 200	Andrew Ranger	Sam Fellows	Marc-Antoine Camirand	Chevrolet	96	Report
10	APC 125	D.J. Kennington	D.J. Kennington	Donald Theetge	Chevrolet	80	Report
11	NTN 125	Donald Theetge	Donald Theetge	Donald Theetge	Chevrolet	80	Report
12	XPN 250	Alex Labbé	Marc-Antoine Camirand	Marc-Antoine Camirand	Chevrolet	96	Report

=== Drivers' championship ===
(key) Bold – Pole position awarded by time. Italics – Pole position set by final practice results, Owners' points, or heat race. ^{L} –Led race lap (1 point). * – Led most race laps (1 point). (R) - Rookie of the Year candidate.

Pos.	Driver	MSP	RIS	EIR	SAS	CMP	ACD	CTR	ICAR	MSP	DEL	DEL	AMS	Points
1	Marc-Antoine Camirand	1^{L}	7	1^{L}	4^{L}	4^{L*}	16	**2**^{L}	1^{L*}	1^{L}	6	5	1^{L*}	499
2	D. J. Kennington	7	**1**^{L*}	5^{L}	6	8	4	7	8	6	**2**^{L*}	2^{L}	5	476
3	Andrew Ranger	6	4	4	8	5^{L}	14	1^{L*}	**2**^{L}	5^{L}	4	7	6	470
4	Kevin Lacroix	8	6^{L}	3^{L}	**1**^{L*}	24	3	10^{L}	4	24	3	3	9	438
5	L. P. Dumoulin	5	8	10	3	3	13	3	16	8	11	13	13	422
6	Mathieu Kingsbury	15	5	7	7	7	5^{L}	13	7	22	8	8	7	419
7	Donald Theetge		14	**2**^{L*}	9		**2**^{L*}	28			1^{L}	**1**^{L*}	4^{L}	305
8	Ryan Vargas	12^{L}	3	6	5	22	7	27			8	4		303
9	Larry Jackson	21	10			17	10	14	19	27	14	14	11	283
10	Alex Guenette	4				2^{L}	12	8	5	11			8	259
11	Domenic Scrivo **(R)**	25				9		19	13	16	12	12	19	227
12	Alex Tagliani	18^{L}				6^{L}		20^{L}	3	4				172
13	Brent Wheller	22	12			21^{L}				20	10	11		169
14	Dave Coursol	14					8	16	10				10	162
15	Malcolm Strachan	3^{L*}				20				23	9	9		158
16	Alex Labbé						6	9	6				**3**^{L}	153
17	Jason Hathaway	9	9	8	2^{L}									149
18	Simon Charbonneau **(R)**	16				14		26	15	10				133
19	Gary Klutt	2^{L}				**16**^{L}		18		9				133
20	Will Larue **(R)**		2^{L}				1^{L*}						2	132
21	Sam Fellows	20				11		21		3^{L*}				123
22	Simon Dion-Viens						11	15	11				18	121
23	J. P. Bergeron	26				15		11	9					115
24	Darryl Timmers **(R)**	13						6		18^{L}				96
25	Matthew Shirley **(R)**			9	10								20	93
26	Connor Bell **(R)**					1^{L}				2				89
27	Kyle Steckly	**27**						12		7^{L}				87
28	Glenn Styres	17								15			15	85
29	Dexter Stacey						9	23		17				83
30	Serge Bourdeau							17	12	21				82
31	Connor Pritiko **(R)**										5	6		77
32	Jacques Guenette Sr. **(R)**					18			18	19				77
33	Benoit Couture **(R)**					13		24		25				70
34	J.F. Dumoulin						15	5						68
35	Jonathan Aarts **(R)**										13	10		65
36	Maxime Gauvreau						17						21	50
37	Matthew Scannell	28								13				47
38	Ryan Klutt	19								26				43
39	Martin Goulet Jr. **(R)**							29					17	42
40	Raphaël Lessard							4						40
41	Peter Klutt	24								28				36
42	Danny Chisholm **(R)**	10												34
43	Todd Musker **(R)**					10								34
44	Josh Hurley **(R)**	11												33
45	Sara Thorne **(R)**		11											33
46	Rob Naismith **(R)**				11									33
47	Ron Tomlinson **(R)**					12								32
48	Jack Polito **(R)**									12				32
49	Frédérik Ladouceur **(R)**												12	32
50	Bryan Cathcart		13											31
51	Marc-André Lachapelle **(R)**								14					30
52	Trevor Hill									14				30
53	Christopher Bedard **(R)**												14	30
54	Sam Charland **(R)**												16	28
55	Justin Arseneau **(R)**								17					27
56	Jeff Cavanagh **(R)**					19								25
57	Alexandre Fortin **(R)**							22						22
58	David Thorndyke	23												21
59	Geoff Johnson **(R)**					23								21
60	Vittorio Ghirelli							25						19

Following Round 3 at the NAPA 300 at Edmonton International Raceway, Marc-Antoine Camirand was penalized 6 points in the NASCAR Canada Series Championship Owners points after being found guilty of intentionally wrecking another vehicle, regardless of whether that vehicle is removed from Competition as a result. Kevin Lacroix was the other driver involved in the incident and was given probation up to and including December 31, 2025

== See also ==
- 2025 NASCAR Cup Series
- 2025 NASCAR Xfinity Series
- 2025 NASCAR Craftsman Truck Series
- 2025 ARCA Menards Series
- 2025 ARCA Menards Series East
- 2025 ARCA Menards Series West
- 2025 NASCAR Whelen Modified Tour
- 2025 NASCAR Mexico Series
- 2025 NASCAR Euro Series
- 2025 NASCAR Brasil Series
- 2025 CARS Tour
- 2025 SMART Modified Tour
