= Simon Charbonneau =

Canadian racing driver (born 1988)

- Born: May 8, 1988 (age 38); Saint-Jérôme, Quebec, Canada

NASCAR Canada Series career
- 16 races run over 4 years
- Car no., team: No. 88 (Eighty8 Racing)
- 2026 position: 22nd
- Best finish: 18th (2025)
- First race: 2023 Ebay Motors 200 (Mosport)
- Last race: 2026 WeatherTech 200 (Mosport)
Wins	Top tens	Poles
0	1	0
- Statistics up to date as of September 13, 2026.

Simon Charbonneau (born May 8, 1988) is a Canadian professional stock car racing driver. He competes part-time in the NASCAR Canada Series, driving the No. 88 Chevrolet for Eighty8 Racing.

== Racing career ==
Charbonneau was the Karting Honda lite Senior Champion in 2005. In 2020, he won the Nissan Sentra Cup's inaugural Nissan Grand Prix at Circuit ICAR. Charbonneau was the Nissan Sentra Cup Mid-Season Champion and Vice-Champion in 2022 and Mid-Season Champion in 2023. He made his NASCAR Pinty's Series debut in 2023 at Canadian Tire Motorsport Park, finishing 24th due to a crash after ten laps. Charbonneau ran four races in the renamed Canada Series in 2024, scoring a best finish of 13th at CTMP. He would run five races in 2025, scoring his first career top-ten with a tenth place finish at CTMP. He would run six races in 2026, scoring a best finish of 11th at ICAR. In the inaugural Omnifab Sprints, qualifying races for the Le Tours 45 CarGurus at Circuit Trois-Rivières, Charbonneau was a contender early in his race before spinning from third.

== Motorsports career results ==
=== NASCAR ===
(key) (Bold – Pole position awarded by qualifying time. Italics – Pole position earned by points standings or practice time. * – Most laps led.)

==== Canada Series ====
NASCAR Canada Series results
Year	Team	No.	Make	1	2	3	4	5	6	7	8	9	10	11	12	13	14	NCSC	Pts	Ref
2023	DJK Racing	88	Dodge	SUN	MSP; 24	ACD	AVE	TOR	EIR	SAS	SAS	CTR	OSK	OSK	ICAR	MSP	DEL	58th	20	
2024	Eighty8 Racing	88	Chevy	MSP; 23	ACD	AVE	RIS	RIS	OSK	SAS	EIR	CTR; 25	ICAR; 21	MSP; 13	DEL	AMS		30th	94	
2025	Eighty8 Racing	88	Chevy	MSP; 16	RIS	EDM	SAS	CMP; 14	ACD	CTR; 26	ICAR; 15	MSP; 10	DEL	DEL	AMS			18th	133	
2026	Eighty8 Racing	88	Chevy	MSP; 12	ACD	ACD	RIS	AMS	AMS	CMP; 28	EIR	EIR	CTR; 14	MAR; 19	ICAR; 11	MSP; 19	DEL	22nd	161	
