= Marc-Antoine Camirand =

Canadian racing driver (born 1979)

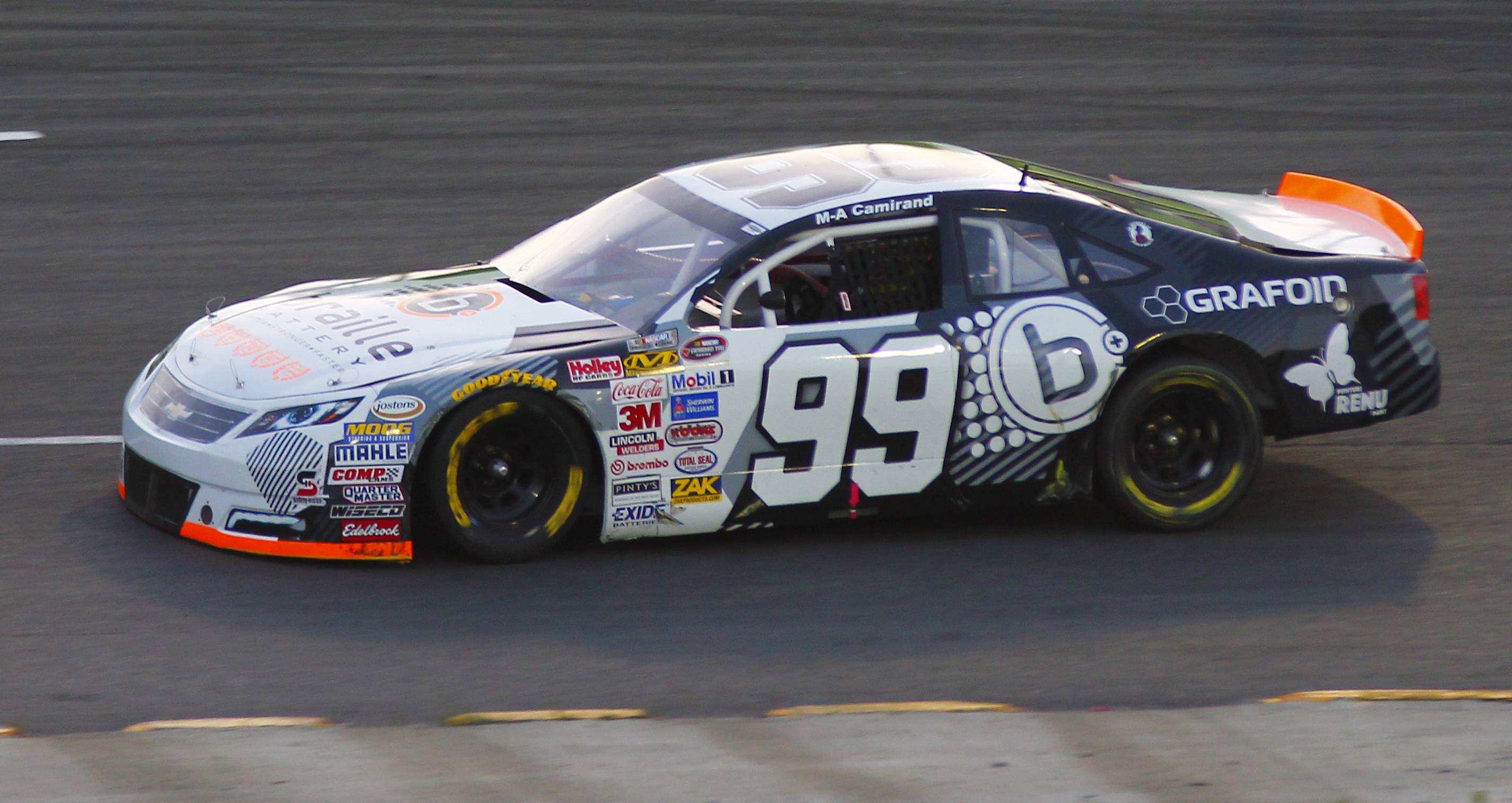
- Camirand competing at Autodrome Chaudière in 2015
- Born: 30 April 1979 (age 47); Saint-Léonard-d'Aston, Quebec, Canada
- Achievements: 2022, 2024, and 2025 NASCAR Canada Series champion 2026 Omnifab Sprints Duel 1 Winner

NASCAR Canada Series career
- 124 races run over 13 years
- Car no., team: No. 96 (Paillé Racing)
- 2026 position: 1st
- Best finish: 1st (2022, 2024, 2025, 2026)
- First race: 2013 JuliaWine.com 100 (Trois-Rivières)
- Last race: 2026 NTN BCA 200 (Delaware)
- First win: 2018 Lucas Oil 250 (St. Eustache)
- Last win: 2026 Markham 125 (Markham)
Wins	Top tens	Poles
25	95	16

ARCA Menards Series East career
- 1 race run over 1 year
- Best finish: 53rd (2015)
- First race: 2015 Bully Hill Vineyards 125 (Watkins Glen)
Wins	Top tens	Poles
0	0	0
- Statistics up to date as of September 13, 2026.

Marc-Antoine Camirand (born 30 April 1979) is a Canadian racing driver. He currently competes full-time in the NASCAR Canada Series, driving the No. 96 Chevrolet for Paillé Racing. He is the 2022, 2024, 2025, and 2026 champion.

== Early career ==
Camirand began karting in the early 1990s, winning the F100 Junior class in the Quebec Karting Championship in 1993, and the Formula Super A class in the Canadian Karting Championship two years later in 1995.

Camirand moved to cars in 1996, beginning with the Formula Ford Canada championship. He won the championship in 1997 and afterwards moved on the U.S. F2000 National Championship. He competed three full seasons in U.S. F2000, with a best finish of second in the championship during the 1999 championship. Camirand made a handful of single-seater series appearances for the next few years, including in the Toyota Atlantic Series and the Formula Renault 2.0 Fran-Am series.

== Sports car racing ==
Camirand made his sports car racing debut in 2002 in the American Le Mans Series with a pair of starts in the LMP675 class driving for Archangel Motorsports.

From 2004 through 2008, Camirand participated in Rolex Sports Car Series in the United States. From 2005 onward, Camirand drove primarily for Spirit of Daytona Racing in the Daytona Prototype class. Camirand did not complete a full season during his Grand-Am career, instead only running partial schedules each year.

== Touring car racing ==
From 2008 through 2012, Camirand participated in the Canadian Touring Car Championship in the Super Touring class. He won several races in the series, including a record-breaking eleven victories at Circuit Trois-Rivières. Camirand's best finish in the championship was fifth in 2012.

== NASCAR Canada Series ==
Camirand made his debut in the NASCAR Canadian Tire Series in 2013 at Circuit Trois-Rivières driving for Derek White. Camirand made one further start that season Canadian Tire Motorsport Park. Camirand continued to drive for White through 2016, including a full season campaign in 2015, where he finished seventh in the championship.

In 2017, Camirand switched teams to drive for Scott Steckly. 2017 was another partial season, but Camirand began competing full-time for Steckly in 2018. During the 2018 season, Camirand picked up his first career race victory in the series at Autodrome St. Eustache en route to a sixth-place finish in the championship. Camirand continued to drive for Steckly's team in 2019 and 2021, picking up another race victory in 2021 at Canadian Tire Motorsports Park.

In 2022, Camirand moved to the GM Paillé Partners team. Camirand won three races during the season and accumulated nine top-five finishes en route to his first Pinty's Series championship victory. Camirand led 803 laps during the season, the second most for a single season in series history.

In 2023, Camirand would be leading on the final lap at Canadian Tire Motorsport Park but contact from Treyten Lapcevich would cause Camirand to fall to second.

From 2024 to 2026, Camirand picked up three championships (2024—2026) with a total of sixteen victories.

== Career results ==
=== NASCAR ===
(key) (Bold – Pole position awarded by qualifying time. Italics – Pole position earned by points standings or practice time. * – Most laps led.)

==== Canada Series ====
NASCAR Canada Series results
Year	Team	No.	Make	1	2	3	4	5	6	7	8	9	10	11	12	13	14	NCSC	Pts	Ref
2013	Derek White	88	Chevy	MSP	DEL	MSP	ICAR	MPS	SAS	ASE	CTR; 29	RIS	MSP; 6	BAR	KWA			37th	54	
2014	Derek White	88	Chevy	MSP; 19	ACD					**CTR**; **20**	RIS	MSP; 3	BAR					22nd	135	
2014	Derek White	99	Chevy			ICAR; 28	EIR	SAS	ASE					KWA; 17				22nd	135	
2015	Derek White	99	Chevy	MSP; 23	ACD; 11	SSS; 8	ICAR; 7	EIR; 5	SAS; 5	ASE; 3	CTR; 6	RIS; 2	MSP; 27	KWA; 5				7th	382	
2016	Brandon White	99	Chevy	MSP	SSS	ACD	ICAR	TOR	EIR	SAS	CTR; 15	RIS	MSP	ASE	KWA			49th	29	
2017	22 Racing	22	Chevy	MSP	DEL	ACD	ICAR; 3	TOR; 16	SAS	SAS	EIR	CTR; 3	RIS	MSP; 7	ASE	JUK		18th	148	
2018	22 Racing	22	Chevy	MSP; 2	JUK; 4	ACD; 6	TOR; 6	SAS; 4	SAS; 3	EIR; 6	**CTR**; **5**	RIS; 13	MSP; 25	ASE; 1	NHA; 10	JUK; 7		6th	488	
2019	22 Racing	22	Chevy	MSP; 18	JUK; 6	ACD; 11	TOR; 16	SAS; 9	SAS; 9	EIR; 6	CTR; 18	RIS; 10	MSP; 2	ASE; 9	NHA; 5	JUK; 11		7th	442	
2021	22 Racing	22	Chevy	SUN; 7	SUN; 12	CTR; 23	ICAR; 18	MSP; 2	MSP; 1	FLA; 15	DEL; 20	DEL; 10	DEL; 21					11th	315	
2022	GM Paillé Partners	96	Chevy	SUN; 4	MSP; 14	ACD; 2	AVE; 1	TOR; 9	EIR; 1	SAS; 3	SAS; 20	CTR; 3	**OSK**; **4**	**ICAR**; **2**	**MSP**; **1**	DEL; 9		1st	523	
2023	GM Paillé Partners	96	Chevy	SUN; 4	MSP; 2	ACD; 1	AVE; 3	TOR; 3	**EIR**; **1**	SAS; 3	SAS; 5	**CTR**; **1**	OSK; 5	OSK; 13	**ICAR**; **1**	MSP; 3	DEL; 22	2nd	551	
2024	GM Paillé Partners	96	Chevy	MSP; 1	**ACD**; 3	AVE; 3	RIS; 7	RIS; 11	OSK; 1	**SAS**; 1*	EIR; 2	**CTR**; 1	ICAR; 3	MSP; 2	DEL; 6	AMS; 6		1st	548	
2025	GM Paillé Partners	96	Chevy	MSP; 1	RIS; 7	EDM; 1	SAS; 4	CMP; 4	ACD; 16	**CTR**; 2	ICAR; 1*	MSP; 1	DEL; 6	DEL; 5	AMS; 1*			1st	499	
2026	GM Paillé Partners	96	Chevy	MSP; 10	ACD; 1*	ACD; 1*	RIS; 4	**AMS**; 1	AMS; 1*	CMP; 4	EIR; 3	**EIR**; 1*	CTR; 1*	MAR; 1*	ICAR; 3	MSP; 2	DEL; 4	1st	621	

=== Sports car racing ===
==== 24 Hours of Daytona results ====
Year	Team	Co-drivers	Car	Class	Laps	Pos.	Class Pos.
2008	(United States) Spirit of Daytona Racing	(United States) Guy Cosmo (United States) Michael McDowell	Fabcar FDSC/03–Porsche	DP	652	15th	10th

Sporting positions
Preceded by Louis-Philippe Dumoulin	NASCAR Canada Series champion 2022; 2024—2026	Succeeded by Treyten Lapcevich; Incumbent
