= Dave Coursol =

Canadian racing driver (born 1994)

- Born: January 1, 1994 (age 32); Sainte-Sophie, Quebec, Canada

NASCAR Canada Series career
- 29 races run over 8 years
- Car no., team: No. 54 (Coursol Performance)
- 2026 position: 15th
- Best finish: 14th (2025)
- First race: 2011 Grand Prix ICAR (ICAR)
- Last race: 2026 NAPA 100 (ICAR)
Wins	Top tens	Poles
0	7	0
- Statistics up to date as of September 13, 2026.

Dave Coursol (born January 1, 1994) is a Canadian professional stock car racing driver. He competes part-time in the NASCAR Canada Series, driving the No. 54 Dodge/Chevrolet for his family team, Coursol Performance.

== Racing career ==
=== NASCAR Weekly Series and ACT ===
Coursol began racing in the NASCAR Weekly Series in 2010 at Autodrome St. Eustache, winning the track championship in the D-II Asphalt division. Between 2010 and 2021, he scored a total of seven wins. Coursol competed in eighteen Serie ACT Quebec races between 2011 and 2025, scoring four top-tens. He has also competed in four ACT Late Model Tour races between 2014 and 2025, scoring a top-ten in 2022. Coursol finished fourth in the 2022 Tom Curley 250 at Autodrome Montmagny. He finished fifteenth in the Bacon Bowl 200 at Autodrome Chaudière in 2022 and 2023.

=== NASCAR Canada Series ===
Coursol first began competing in the NASCAR Canadian Tire Series in 2011. He drove the No. 94 Chevrolet at Circuit ICAR and Circuit Trois-Rivières, finishing in the top-20 in both events. Coursol returned for four events in 2012, this time driving a Dodge, where he qualified for three races with a best result of fourteenth at ICAR. After not competing in the series in 2013, Coursol returned for one race in 2014, finishing 13th at Trois-Rivières. Coursol competed in four races in 2015, scoring a best finish of twelfth at Trois-Rivières. He would not compete in the series again until 2023, where he competed at Trois-Rivières and ICAR in the No. 54. In 2024, Coursol competed in four races, making his first oval start in the series at Autodrome Chaudière and scoring his first top-ten finish at ICAR. Coursol ran five races in 2025, finishing inside the top-ten in three of them, including a career-best eight place result at Chaudière. Coursol has competed in the opening three races in 2026, scoring a best result of ninth in the second Chaudière race.

== Motorsports career results ==
=== NASCAR ===
(key) (Bold – Pole position awarded by qualifying time. Italics – Pole position earned by points standings or practice time. * – Most laps led.)

==== Canada Series ====
NASCAR Canada Series results
Year	Team	No.	Make	1	2	3	4	5	6	7	8	9	10	11	12	13	14	NCSC	Pts	Ref
2011	Coursol Performance	94	Chevy	MSP	ICAR; 16	DEL	MSP	TOR	MPS	SAS	CTR; 20	CGV	BAR	RIS	KWA			42nd	218	
2012	Coursol Performance	94	Dodge	MSP; 15	ICAR; 14	MSP	DEL	MPS	EDM	SAS	CTR; 25	CGV; DNQ	BAR	RIS	KWA			32nd	87	
2014	Ray Courtemanche Jr.	94	Dodge	MSP	ACD	ICAR	EIR	SAS	ASE	CTR; 13	RIS	MSP	BAR	KWA				46th	31	
2015	Ray Courtemanche Jr.	94	Dodge	MSP; 15	ACD	SSS	ICAR; 16	EIR	SAS	ASE	CTR; 12	RIS	MSP; 15	KWA				23rd	118	
2023	Coursol Performance	54	Dodge	SUN	MSP	ACD	AVE	TOR	EIR	SAS	SAS	CTR; 13	OSK	OSK	ICAR; 14	MSP	DEL	39th	61	
2024	Coursol Performance	54	Chevy	MSP	ACD; 14	AVE	RIS	RIS	OSK	SAS	EIR	CTR; 15	ICAR; 10	MSP	DEL	AMS; 20		22nd	117	
2025	Coursol Performance	54	Dodge	MSP; 14	RIS	EDM	SAS	CMP										14th	162	
2025	Coursol Performance	54	Chevy						ACD; 8	CTR; 16	ICAR; 10	MSP	DEL	DEL	AMS; 10			14th	162	
2026	Coursol Performance	54	Dodge	MSP; 11						CMP; 26	EIR	EIR	CTR; 11	MAR	ICAR; 12	MSP	DEL	15th	249	
2026	Coursol Performance	54	Chevy		ACD; 15	ACD; 9	RIS	AMS; 9	AMS; 10									15th	249	

^{*} Season still in progress
^{1} Ineligible for series points
