= 2026 Omnifab Sprints =

2026 NASCAR Canada Series qualifying races at Circuit Trois-Rivières

- Date: August 7, 2026
- Location: Circuit Trois-Rivières; Trois-Rivières, Quebec
- Course: Temporary street circuit 1.521 mi (2.448 km)
- Scheduled distance: Race 1: 15 laps, 22.8 mi (36.7 km); Race 2: 15 laps, 22.8 mi (36.7 km)
- Avg Speed: Race 1: 78.062 miles per hour (125.629 km/h); Race 2: 78.217 miles per hour (125.878 km/h)

Race 1
- Pole position: Marc-Antoine Camirand
- Most laps led: Marc-Antoine Camirand (15)
- Winner: Marc-Antoine Camirand

Race 2
- Pole position: Kevin Lacroix
- Most laps led: Kevin Lacroix (15)
- Winner: Kevin Lacroix

Television in the United States
- Network: REV TV on YouTube

The 2026 Omnifab Sprints were a pair of NASCAR Canada Series stock car races held on Saturday, August 8, 2026, at Circuit Trois-Rivières, a 1.521 mi (2.448 km) street circuit in Trois-Rivières, Quebec, Canada. Inspired by The Duel at Daytona qualifying races for the Daytona 500, the races will be contested over 15 laps as qualifying races for the 2026 Le Tours 45 CarGurus, the first time this format has been used.

== Report ==
=== Background ===
The Circuit Trois-Rivières is a street circuit in Trois-Rivières, Quebec, Canada. The circuit has been the home of the annual Grand Prix de Trois-Rivières, the longest-running street race in North America, since 1967.

On December 9, 2025, it was announced that duel races like those used for the Daytona 500 would set the lineup for the GP3R in 2026. The name for the races was later revealed as the Omnifab Sprints.

== Qualifying ==
Qualifying was held on Saturday, August 8, at 12:00 PM EST; the front row for the Le Tours 45 CarGurus was set by qualifying, while qualifying also set the lineup for the Omnifab Sprints. Kevin Lacroix secured the pole for the sprint and main event with a lap of 1:08.256 and a speed of 80.222 mph (129.105 km/h), while Marc-Antoine Camirand secured second for main event and pole for the sprint with a lap of 1:08.267 and a speed of 80.209 mph (129.084 km/h).

=== Qualifying results ===
Pos.	#	Driver	Team	Make	Time	Speed
1	74	Kevin Lacroix	Innovation Auto Sport	Chevrolet	1:08.256	80.222
2	96	Marc-Antoine Camirand	Paillé Course//Racing	Chevrolet	1:08.267	80.209
3	27	Andrew Ranger	Innovation Auto Sport	Chevrolet	1:08.284	80.189
4	88	Simon Charbonneau	Eighty8 Racing	Chevrolet	1:08.295	80.176
5	39	Alex Guenette	JASS Racing with XEMIS Racing	Chevrolet	1:08.448	79.996
6	36	Alex Labbé	LL Motorsports	Chevrolet	1:08.623	79.792
7	50	Vittorio Ghirelli	Dumoulin Compétition	Chevrolet	1:08.637	79.776
8	47	L. P. Dumoulin	Dumoulin Compétition	Dodge	1:08.701	79.702
9	80	Alex Tagliani	Theetge Motorsports	Chevrolet	1:08.741	79.656
10	45	Will Larue (R)	Larue Motorsports	Chevrolet	1:09.074	79.272
11	87	Sam Fellows	Fellows McGraw Racing	Chevrolet	1:09.246	79.075
12	17	D. J. Kennington	DJK Racing	Dodge	1:09.355	78.950
13	04	J. F. Dumoulin	Dumoulin Compétition	Dodge	1:09.387	78.914
14	9	Mathieu Kingsbury	Innovation Auto Sport	Chevrolet	1:09.421	78.875
15	7	Raphaël Lessard	DJK Racing	Dodge	1:09.518	78.765
16	3	Connor Bell (R)	Ed Hakonson Racing	Chevrolet	1:09.555	78.723
17	73	Donald Theetge	Theetge Motorsports	Chevrolet	1:09.609	78.662
18	8	Justin Arseneau (R)	Ed Hakonson Racing	Chevrolet	1:09.674	78.589
19	1	J. P. Bergeron	Prolon Racing Team	Ford	1:10.326	77.860
20	54	Dave Coursol	Coursol Performance	Dodge	1:10.553	77.630
21	37	Simon Dion-Viens	SDV Autosport	Dodge	1:10.648	77.505
22	53	Herby Drescher	Herby Motorsports	Dodge	1:10.945	77.181
23	83	Martin Goulet Jr. (R)	Goulet Motorsports	Chevrolet	1:11.042	77.076
24	69	Domenic Scrivo	MBS Motorsports	Chevrolet	1:12.266	75.770
25	94	Sylvain Ouellet (R)	Theetge Motorsports	Chevrolet	1:12.507	75.518
26	75	Ben Couture	BCM Motorsports	Dodge	1:12.616	75.405
27	55	Serge Bordeau	BCM Motorsports	Dodge	1:12.752	75.264
28	93	Jacques Guenette Sr. (R)	JASS Racing with XEMIS Racing	Chevrolet	1:16.235	71.825
29	84	Larry Jackson	Larry Jackson Racing	Dodge	1:17.449	70.699
30	24	Jared Odrick (R)	BC Race Cars	Ford	–	–
Full qualifying results

== Sprints ==
=== Sprint 1 ===
In Sprint 1, Marc-Antoine Camirand led from pole over drivers such as Simon Charbonneau and L. P. Dumoulin, although Charbonneau would eventually spin shortly after being passed by Dumoulin; Camirand would score the win over Alex Labbé and Dumoulin.

==== Sprint 1 results ====
Pos	St	#	Driver	Team	Make	Laps	Led	Status	Points
1	1	96	Marc-Antoine Camirand	Paillé Course//Racing	Chevrolet	15	15	Running	5
2	3	36	Alex Labbé	LL Motorsports	Chevrolet	15	0	Running	4
3	4	47	L. P. Dumoulin	Dumoulin Compétition	Dodge	15	0	Running	3
4	6	17	D. J. Kennington	DJK Racing	Dodge	15	0	Running	2
5	5	45	Will Larue (R)	Larue Motorsports	Chevrolet	15	0	Running	1
6	9	8	Justin Arseneau (R)	Ed Hakonson Racing	Chevrolet	15	0	Running	0
7	2	88	Simon Charbonneau	Eighty8 Racing	Chevrolet	15	0	Running	0
8	8	8	Connor Bell (R)	Ed Hakonson Racing	Chevrolet	15	0	Running	0
9	11	53	Herby Drescher	Herby Motorsports	Dodge	15	0	Running	0
10	7	9	Mathieu Kingsbury	Innovation Auto Sport	Chevrolet	15	0	Running	0
11	15	24	Jared Odrick (R)	BC Race Cars	Ford	15	0	Running	0
12	12	69	Domenic Scrivo	MBS Motorsports	Chevrolet	14	0	Running	0
13	13	75	Ben Couture	BCM Motorsports	Dodge	14	0	Running	0
14	14	93	Jacques Guenette Sr. (R)	JASS Racing with XEMIS Racing	Chevrolet	14	0	Running	0
15	10	54	Dave Coursol	Coursol Performance	Dodge	7	0	DNF	0
Official race results

=== Sprint 2 ===
In Sprint 2, Kevin Lacroix led from pole over Andrew Ranger and Alex Guenette, the latter of whom was involved in a battle with Alex Tagliani in the closing laps; Lacroix would score the win over Ranger and Tagliani.

==== Sprint 2 results ====
Pos	St	#	Driver	Team	Make	Laps	Led	Status	Points
1	1	74	Kevin Lacroix	Innovation Auto Sport	Chevrolet	15	15	Running	5
2	2	27	Andrew Ranger	Innovation Auto Sport	Chevrolet	15	0	Running	4
3	5	80	Alex Tagliani	Theetge Motorsports	Chevrolet	15	0	Running	3
4	3	39	Alex Guenette	JASS Racing with XEMIS Racing	Chevrolet	15	0	Running	2
5	4	50	Vittorio Ghirelli	Dumoulin Compétition	Chevrolet	15	0	Running	1
6	8	7	Raphaël Lessard	DJK Racing	Dodge	15	0	Running	0
7	7	04	J. F. Dumoulin	Dumoulin Compétition	Dodge	15	0	Running	0
8	6	87	Sam Fellows	Fellows McGraw Racing	Chevrolet	15	0	Running	0
9	10	1	J. P. Bergeron	Prolon Racing Team	Ford	15	0	Running	0
10	11	37	Simon Dion-Viens	SDV Autosport	Dodge	15	0	Running	0
11	12	83	Martin Goulet Jr. (R)	Goulet Motorsports	Chevrolet	15	0	Running	0
12	13	94	Sylvain Ouellet (R)	Theetge Motorsports	Chevrolet	15	0	Running	0
13	14	55	Serge Bordeau	BCM Motorsports	Chevrolet	14	0	Running	0
14	9	73	Donald Theetge	Theetge Motorsports	Chevrolet	9	0	DNF	0
15	15	84	Larry Jackson	Larry Jackson Racing	Dodge	4	0	DNF	0
Official race results

Previous race: 2026 Carlyle Tools 150	NASCAR Canada Series; 2026 season	Next race: 2026 Le Tours 45 CarGurus
