= NAPA 100 =

NASCAR Canada Series races in Mirabel, Quebec

NASCAR Canada Series
- Venue: Circuit ICAR
- Location: Mirabel, Quebec
- First race: 2011
- Laps: 43
- Most wins (driver): Andrew Ranger (5)

Circuit information
- Surface: Asphalt
- Turns: 16

The NAPA 100 is a NASCAR Canada Series stock car race held annually at Circuit ICAR in Mirabel, Quebec, Alex Guenette is the defending winner, having won it in 2026.

== Past winners ==
| Year | Date | Driver | Team | Car | Distance | Race title | Report | Ref |
|---|---|---|---|---|---|---|---|---|
| 2011 | June 5 | (Canada) Robin Buck | Quaker State | Dodge | 33 Laps | Grand Prix ICAR | Report | |
| 2012 | June 3 | (Canada) Andrew Ranger | Dodge/GC Motorsports | Dodge | 31 Laps | Lucas Oil Grand Prix presented by Budweiser | Report | |
| 2013 | July 7 | (Canada) Andrew Ranger | La Cite De Mirabel Inc. | Dodge | 30 Laps | Jiffy Lube 100 presented by Snap-on | Report | |
| 2014 | July 6 | (Canada) Andrew Ranger | Mopar | Dodge | 30 Laps | Jiffy Lube 100 presented by La Petite Bretonne | Report | |
| 2015 | July 5 | (Canada) Kevin Lacroix | Lacroix Tuning/Excellence Chrysler | Dodge | 30 Laps | Ecko Unlimited 100 | Report | |
| 2016 | July 3 | (Canada) Andrew Ranger | Mopar/Pennzoil/Mopar Express Lane | Dodge | 30 Laps | ICAR 100 | Report | |
| 2017 | July 8 | (Canada) Kevin Lacroix | Lacroix Tuning/Excellence Chrysler | Dodge | 79 Laps | Ecko Unlimited 75 | Report | |
2018–2020 | Not Held
| 2021 | August 28 | (Canada) Kevin Lacroix | Bumper to Bumper / Lacroix Tuning | Dodge | 83 Laps | La Fernandiere 75 | Report | |
| 2022 | August 27 | (Canada) Kevin Lacroix | NAPA Pieces D'Auto / Valvoline / Lacroix Tuni | Dodge | 70 Laps | General Tire 125 | Report | |
| 2023 | August 26 | (Canada) Marc-Antoine Camirand | GM Paille / Chevrolet Canada | Chevrolet | 55 Laps | Evirum 125 | Report | |
| 2024 | August 24 | (Canada) Andrew Ranger | GM Paille / Chevrolet Canada | Chevrolet | 43 Laps | Evirum 100 | Report | |
| 2025 | August 23 | (Canada) Marc-Antoine Camirand | GM Paille / Chevrolet Canada | Chevrolet | 43 Laps | Evirum 100 | Report | |
| 2026 | August 29 | (Canada) Alex Guenette | JASS Racing | Chevrolet | 43 Laps | NAPA 100 | Report | |

| Previous race: Markham 125 | NASCAR Canada Series; NAPA 100 | Next race: WeatherTech 200 |
