= Kevin Lacroix (racing driver) =

Canadian racing driver (born 1989)

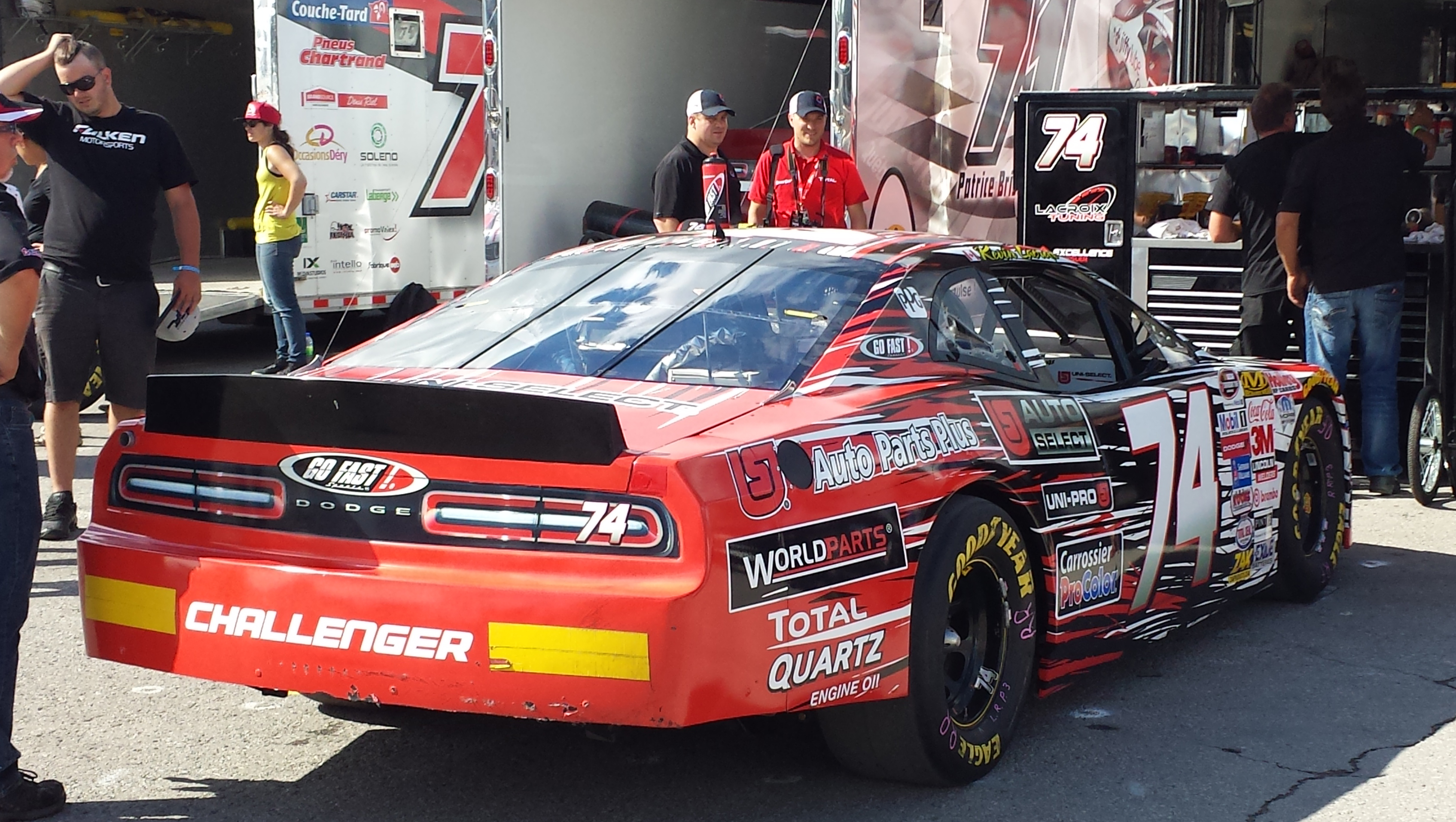
- Lacroix's No. 74 at Circuit Trois-Rivières in 2015
- Born: March 14, 1989 (age 37); Saint-Eustache, Quebec, Canada
- Achievements: 2026 Omnifab Sprints Duel 2 Winner

NASCAR Canada Series career
- 139 races run over 12 years
- Car no., team: No. 74 (Innovation Auto Sport)
- 2026 position: 3rd
- Best finish: 2nd (2017, 2019, 2020, 2022, 2024)
- First race: 2015 Pinty's Presents the Clarington 200 (Mosport)
- Last race: 2026 NTN BCA 200 (Delaware)
- First win: 2015 Ecko Unlimited 100 (ICAR)
- Last win: 2026 Dorman Products 150 (Edmonton)
Wins	Top tens	Poles
27	107	20
- Statistics up to date as of September 13, 2026.

Kevin Lacroix (born March 14, 1989) is a Canadian racing driver from Saint-Eustache, Quebec. He currently competes full-time in the NASCAR Canada Series, driving the No. 74 Chevrolet for Innovation Auto Sport, a team he formed with fellow driver Mathieu Kingsbury.

== Racing career ==
After karting, Lacroix drove in Formula BMW USA in 2005 and finished second with four wins. In 2006, he competed in the Star Mazda Series for John Walko Racing and finished second in points with five podium finishes but no wins. 2007 saw him compete in eight races in the second half of the Atlantic Championship season for Brooks Associates Racing. He won in his second start at Portland International Raceway. In 2008, he competed in the full Atlantic Championship schedule for Walker Racing. He finished ninth in points with a best finish of second in the season finale at Road Atlanta.

=== NASCAR Canada Series ===
Lacroix made his NASCAR Canada Series debut at the 2015 Pinty's Presents the Clarington 200 at Canadian Tire Motorsport Park. His debut would end quickly though, as he crashed out of the race on lap four, finishing 26th. Lacroix's second start came at Circuit ICAR where he would dominate the day, taking the lead on lap two from veteran Alex Tagliani and never looking back on his way to his first career win. Lacroix won his second race of the year at Circuit de Trois-Rivieres, again in impressive fashion.

In 2016, Lacroix would win two times during the season. He would score five top-fives, eight top-tens and two poles. He would finish the season fourth in the final season standings.

In 2017, Lacroix would win the season opener at Canadian Tire Motorsport Park after qualifying on pole. He would go onto win later on at Circuit ICAR and Exhibition Place in back-to-back races. He would win again at Canadian Tire Motorsport Park. He would score nine top-fives, twelve top-tens and four poles. He would finish the season in the runner up position in the final standings to Alex Labbé.

Lacroix is the only driver in NASCAR Canada Series history to notch wins in two of his first four starts.

== Motorsports career results ==
=== NASCAR ===
(key) (Bold – Pole position awarded by qualifying time. Italics – Pole position earned by points standings or practice time. * – Most laps led. ** – All laps led.)

==== NASCAR Canada Series ====
NASCAR Canada Series results
Year	Team	No.	Make	1	2	3	4	5	6	7	8	9	10	11	12	13	14	NCSC	Pts	Ref
2015	Lacroix Motorsports	74	Dodge	MSP; 26	ACD	SSS	ICAR; 1*	EIR	SAS	ASE; 16	CTR; 1*	RIS	MSP; 26	KWA; 21				15th	184	
2016	Lacroix Motorsports	74	Dodge	MSP; 23	SSS; 5	ACD; 6	ICAR; 3	TOR; 3	**EIR**; 15	SAS; 8	**CTR**; 1**	RIS; 10	MSP; 1*	ASE; 11	KWA; 12			4th	443	
2017	Lacroix Motorsports	74	Dodge	**MSP**; 1*	DEL; 5*	ACD; 6	ICAR; 1	TOR; 1*	**SAS**; 6	SAS; 4	EIR; 9	CTR; 18	RIS; 2*	**MSP**; 1*	**ASE**; 4	JUK; 4		2nd	526	
2018	Lacroix Motorsports	74	Dodge	MSP; 5*	JUK; 1*	ACD; 16		**SAS**; 6	SAS; 7	**EIR**; 2*	CTR; 20	RIS; 8	MSP; 2	**ASE**; 13	NHA; 1*	JUK; 3		5th	490	
2018	Lacroix Motorsports	74	Chevy				TOR; 16											5th	490	
2019	Lacroix Motorsports	74	Dodge	MSP; 1*	JUK; 2	ACD; 2	TOR; 4	SAS; 2*	SAS; 5	EIR; 7	CTR; 4	RIS; 6*	**MSP**; 1	ASE; 2	**NHA**; 12*	JUK; 5*		2nd	539	
2020	Lacroix Motorsports	74	Dodge	SUN; 8	SUN; 3	FLA; 2	FLA; 1*	JUK; 2	JUK; 4									2nd	251	
2021	Lacroix Motorsports	74	Dodge	SUN; 4	SUN; 17	CTR; 3	ICAR; 1*	MSP; 24	MSP; 4	FLA; 18	DEL; 4	DEL; 19	DEL; 2					6th	352	
2022	Lacroix Motorsports	74	Dodge	SUN; 5	MSP; 1*	ACD; 13	AVE; 7	TOR; 1*	EDM; 2	SAS; 21	SAS; 7	**CTR**; 19	OSK; 11	ICAR; 1*	MSP; 2	DEL; 3		2nd	496	
2023	Lacroix Motorsports	74	Dodge	SUN; 3	MSP; 4	ACD; 4	AVE; 5*	TOR; 2	EIR; 4	SAS; 9	SAS; 9	CTR; 30	OSK; 2	OSK; 9	ICAR; 22	MSP; 1	DEL; 5	5th	514	
2024	Innovation Auto Sport	74	Dodge	MSP; 28	ACD; 2	**AVE**; 2	**RIS**; 1*	RIS; 1*	OSK; 7	SAS; 2	**EIR**; 1*	CTR; 23	ICAR; 2*	MSP; 1*	**DEL**; 1*	AMS; 1*		2nd	538	
2025	Innovation Auto Sport	74	Chevy	MSP; 8	RIS; 6	EDM; 3	**SAS**; 1*	CMP; 24	ACD; 3	CTR; 10	ICAR; 4	MSP; 24	DEL; 3	DEL; 3	AMS; 9			4th	438	
2026	Innovation Auto Sport	74	Chevy	MSP; 27	ACD; 10	ACD; 6	RIS; 1*	AMS; 3	AMS; 2	CMP; 10	EIR; 1	EIR; 3	**CTR**; 26	MAR; 18	ICAR; 4	MSP; 12	DEL; 2	3rd	508	

^{*} Season still in progress
^{1} Ineligible for series points
