= NTN BCA 200 =

NASCAR Canada Series races in Delaware, Ontario

NASCAR Canada Series
- Venue: Delaware Speedway
- Location: Delaware, Ontario
- First race: 2009
- Most wins (driver): D. J. Kennington (5)

Circuit information
- Surface: Asphalt
- Turns: 4

The NTN BCA 200 is a NASCAR Canada Series race held annually at Delaware Speedway in Delaware, Ontario, Canada, it is currently the season finale, Donald Theetge is the defending winner, having won it in 2026.

== Past winners ==
Year	Date	Driver	Car	Report	Ref
2009	June 6	D. J. Kennington	Dodge	Report	
2010	June 5	D. J. Kennington	Dodge	Report	
2011	June 11	Don Thomson Jr.	Dodge	Report	
2012	June 23	D. J. Kennington	Dodge	Report	
2013	June 15	Peter Shepherd	Dodge	Report	
2014–2016 | Not Held
2017	June 3	Alex Labbé	Ford	Report	
2018–2020 | Not Held
2021	September 24	D. J. Kennington	Dodge	Report	
2021	September 26	D. J. Kennington	Dodge	Report	
2021	September 26	Andew Ranger	Dodge	Report	
2022	September 25	Brandon Watson	Chevrolet	Report	
2023	September 24	Treyten Lapcevich	Chevrolet	Report	
2024	August 17	Kevin Lacroix	Dodge	Report	
2025	September 13	Donald Theetge	Chevrolet	Report	
2025	September 13	Donald Theetge	Chevrolet	Report	
2026	September 12	Donald Theetge	Chevrolet	Report	

Previous race: WeatherTech 200	NASCAR Canada Series; NTN BCA 200	Next race: CarGurus 200 (next season)
