= Jean-François Dumoulin =

Canadian racing driver (born 1976)

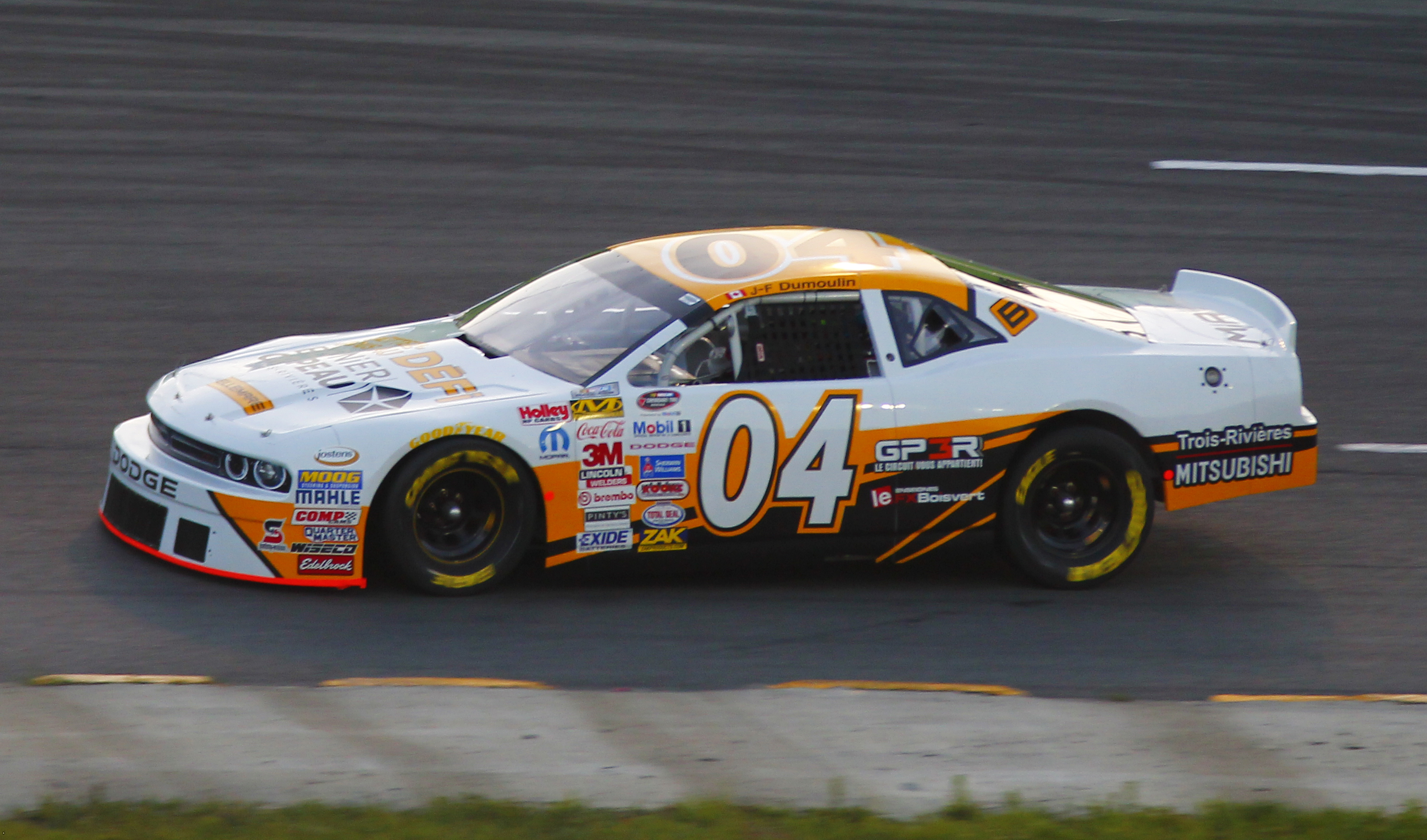
- Dumoulin's No. 04 car at Autodrome Chaudière in 2015
- Born: May 5, 1976 (age 50); Trois-Rivières, Quebec, Canada
- Achievements: 2003 KONI Challenge Series GSI Champion; 2002 KONI Challenge Series ST Champion
- Awards: 2007 Rolex 24 at Daytona GT Class Winner; 2004 Rolex 24 at Daytona SGS Class Winner

NASCAR O'Reilly Auto Parts Series career
- 2 races run over 1 year
- Best finish: 113th (2009)
- First race: 2009 NAPA Auto Parts 200 (Montreal)
| Wins | Top tens | Poles |
|---|---|---|
| 0 | 1 | 0 |

NASCAR Canada Series career
- 73 races run over 18 years
- Car no., team: No. 04 (Dumoulin Compétition)
- 2026 position: 53rd
- Best finish: 8th (2015, 2017)
- First race: 2007 GP3R 100 (Trois-Rivières)
- Last race: 2026 Le Tours 45 CarGurus (Trois-Rivières)
| Wins | Top tens | Poles |
|---|---|---|
| 0 | 41 | 0 |
- Statistics up to date as of September 20, 2026.

Jean-François Dumoulin (born May 5, 1976) is a Canadian racing driver. He competes in the Tudor United SportsCar Championship for Magnus Racing, as well as the NASCAR Canada Series. He is the older brother of Louis-Philippe Dumoulin.

== Grand-Am career ==
Dumoulin made his first career start in the series in 2000 with a fifth-place finish in his class. The following year, he earned a class victory at the Circuit Trois-Rivières. He also competed at the KONI Challenge Series and earned a class victory at Watkins Glen International. In 2002, he won the KONI Championship in the ST Class, despite not winning a single event. He won six races in the GSI class the following year and captured the title. In 2004, he competed in the Rolex 24 at Daytona for the SGS class and won, along with eight other starts in the series. Then in 2007, he captured a GT victory at the same event at Daytona. Dumoulin would drive 11 more races and finished ninth in the standings. In the KONI Series, he won at Watkins Glen International in one of his three starts. For 2008, he co-drove for the No. 15 Ford Mustang Cobra team of Blackforest Motorsports along with Tom Nastasi, David Empringham and Boris Said, Dumoulin drove two races that season (Daytona and Montreal).

== NASCAR career ==
Dumoulin competed at the 2009 NAPA Auto Parts 200 at Montreal for the No. 23 car team for R3 Motorsports; he finished in seventh place with a largely damaged car, including a busted radiator. It was also the first top-ten finish in the team's history.

== Personal life ==
Dumoulin is the older brother of fellow racing driver Louis-Philippe Dumoulin, and are both sons of the other competitor: Richard Dumoulin.

== Motorsports career results ==
=== NASCAR ===
(key) (Bold – Pole position awarded by qualifying time. Italics – Pole position earned by points standings or practice time. * – Most laps led.)

==== Nationwide Series ====
NASCAR Nationwide Series results
| Year | Team | No. | Make | 1 | 2 | 3 | 4 | 5 | 6 | 7 | 8 | 9 | 10 | 11 | 12 | 13 | 14 | 15 | 16 | 17 | 18 | 19 | 20 | 21 | 22 | 23 | 24 | 25 | 26 | 27 | 28 | 29 | 30 | 31 | 32 | 33 | 34 | 35 | NNSC | Pts | Ref |
|---|---|---|---|---|---|---|---|---|---|---|---|---|---|---|---|---|---|---|---|---|---|---|---|---|---|---|---|---|---|---|---|---|---|---|---|---|---|---|---|---|---|
| 2009 | R3 Motorsports | 23 | Chevy | DAY | CAL | LVS | BRI | TEX | NSH | PHO | TAL | RCH | DAR | CLT | DOV | NSH | KEN | MLW | NHA | DAY | CHI | GTY | IRP | IOW | GLN | MCH | BRI | CGV; 7 | ATL | RCH | DOV | KAN | CAL | CLT | MEM | TEX | PHO | HOM | 113th | 146 | |
| 2011 | R3 Motorsports | 03 | Chevy | DAY | PHO | LVS | BRI | CAL | TEX | TAL | NSH | RCH | DAR | DOV | IOW | CLT | CHI | MCH | ROA | DAY | KEN | NHA | NSH | IRP | IOW | GLN | CGV; DNQ | BRI | ATL | RCH | CHI | DOV | KAN | CLT | TEX | PHO | HOM | | N/A | 0 | |

==== Pinty's Series ====
NASCAR Pinty's Series results
| Year | Team owner | No. | Make | 1 | 2 | 3 | 4 | 5 | 6 | 7 | 8 | 9 | 10 | 11 | 12 | 13 | NPSC | Pts | Ref |
|---|---|---|---|---|---|---|---|---|---|---|---|---|---|---|---|---|---|---|---|
| 2007 | Dumoulin Compétition | 07 | Pontiac | HAM | MSP | BAR | MPS | EDM | CGV | MSP | CTR; 10 | HAM | BAR | RIS | KWA | | 39th | 134 | |
| 2008 | Jacombs Racing | 07 | Pontiac | HAM | MSP | BAR | ASE | MPS | EDM | CGV | MSP | CTR; 7 | HAM | BAR | RIS | KWA | 39th | 146 | |
| 2009 | Dumoulin Compétition | 07 | Chevy | ASE | DEL | MSP | ASE | MPS | EDM | SAS | MSP; 28 | CTR | CGV | BAR | RIS | KWA | 49th | 79 | |
| 2010 | Vincent Lecavalier | 04 | Dodge | DEL | MSP | ASE | TOR | EDM | MPS | SAS | CTR; 7 | MSP | CGV; 8 | BAR | RIS | KWA | 35th | 288 | |
| 2011 | Paul Corbeil | 04 | Dodge | MSP | ICAR; 22 | DEL | MSP; 22 | TOR; 17 | MPS | SAS | CTR; 12 | CGV; 9 | BAR | RIS | KWA | | 25th | 571 | |
| 2012 | Paul Corbeil | 04 | Dodge | MSP | ICAR; 7 | MSP | DEL | MPS | EDM | SAS | CTR; 6 | CGV; 34 | BAR | RIS | KWA | | 33rd | 85 | |
| 2013 | Paul Corbeil | 04 | Dodge | MSP | DEL | MSP | ICAR; 8 | MPS | SAS | ASE | CTR; 17 | RIS | MSP; 15 | BAR | KWA | | 27th | 92 | |
| 2014 | Paul Corbeil | 04 | Dodge | MSP | ACD | ICAR; 14 | EIR | SAS | ASE | CTR; 4 | RIS | MSP; 12 | BAR | KWA | | | 27th | 102 | |
| 2015 | Eric Kerub | 04 | Dodge | MSP; 3 | ACD; 14 | SSS; 5 | ICAR; 14 | EIR; 11 | SAS; 8 | ASE; 8 | CTR; 21 | RIS; 5 | MSP; 5 | KWA; 9 | | | 8th | 381 | |
| 2016 | Eric Kerub | 04 | Dodge | MSP; 6 | SSS | ACD | ICAR; 9 | TOR; 10 | EIR | SAS | CTR; 10 | RIS | MSP; 20 | ASE; 12 | KWA | | 15th | 197 | |
| 2017 | Eric Kerub | 04 | Dodge | MSP; 7 | DEL; 7 | ACD; 8 | ICAR; 13 | TOR; 5 | SAS; 9 | SAS; 19 | EIR; 15 | CTR; 6 | RIS; 7 | MSP; 14 | ASE; 6 | JUK; 5 | 8th | 451 | |
| 2018 | Eric Kerub | 04 | Dodge | MSP; 22 | JUK; 15 | ACD; 7 | TOR; 3 | SAS | SAS | EIR | CTR; 4 | RIS; 10 | MSP; 4 | ASE; 17 | NHA; 15 | JUK; 11 | 11th | 333 | |
| 2019 | Eric Kerub | 04 | Dodge | MSP; 6 | JUK | ACD | TOR; 5 | SAS | SAS | EIR | CTR; 3 | RIS | MSP; 3 | ASE | | | 15th | 214 | |
| 2019 | Dumoulin Compétition | 07 | Dodge | | | | | | | | | | | | NHA; 14 | JUK; 20 | 15th | 214 | |
| 2021 | Eric Kerub | 04 | Dodge | SUN | SUN | CTR; 2 | ICAR | ACD | ACD | MSP | MSP | FLA | FLA | DEL | | | 33rd | 42 | |
| 2022 | Dumoulin Compétition | 04 | Dodge | SUN | MSP | ACD | AVE | TOR | EDM | SAS | SAS | CTR; 16 | OSK | ICAR | MSP | DEL | 43rd | 29 | |

==== Whelen Euro Series – Elite 1 ====
NASCAR Whelen Euro Series – Elite 1 results
| Year | Team | No. | Make | 1 | 2 | 3 | 4 | 5 | 6 | 7 | 8 | 9 | 10 | 11 | 12 | NWES | Pts | Ref |
|---|---|---|---|---|---|---|---|---|---|---|---|---|---|---|---|---|---|---|
| 2018 | RDV Competition | 4 | Toyota | VAL | VAL | FRA | FRA | BRH | BRH | TOU | TOU | HOC | HOC | ZOL; 21 | ZOL; 20 | 34th | 66 | |
