= 2026 Le Tours 45 CarGurus =

10th race of the 2026 NASCAR Canada Series

Race details
- Race 10 of 14 in the 2026 NASCAR Canada Series season
- Date: August 9, 2026
- Location: Circuit Trois-Rivières in Trois-Rivières, Quebec, Canada
- Course: Temporary street circuit
- Course length: 1.521 miles (2.448 km)
- Distance: 45 laps, 68.445 mi (110.152 km)
- Average speed: 50.430 miles per hour (81.159 km/h)

Pole position
Driver	Kevin Lacroix	Innovation Auto Sport
- Time: 1:08.256
- Grid positions set by heat results

Most laps led
Driver	Marc-Antoine Camirand	Paillé Course//Racing
- Laps: 24

Winner
No. 96	Marc-Antoine Camirand	Paillé Course//Racing

Television in the United States
- Network: REV TV on YouTube

The 2026 Le Tours 45 CarGurus, also called the CarGurus 45, was the tenth stock car race of the 2026 NASCAR Canada Series. The race was held on Sunday, August 9, at Circuit Trois-Rivières, a 1.521 mi (2.448 km) street circuit in Trois-Rivières, Quebec, Canada. The race weekend featured a pair of sprint races, the Omnifab Sprints, inspired by The Duel at Daytona, to set the starting lineup. Due to encountering mechanical issues, Kevin Lacroix, who had led the opening twenty-one laps, was forced to retire, handing the lead to Marc-Antoine Camirand, who would lead for the remainder of the race and score the win. L. P. Dumoulin finished the race in second and Alex Guenette rounded out the podium in third.

== Report ==
=== Background ===
The Circuit Trois-Rivières is a street circuit in Trois-Rivières, Quebec, Canada. The circuit has been the home of the annual Grand Prix de Trois-Rivières, the longest-running street race in North America, since 1967.

==== Entry list ====
- (R) denotes rookie driver.
- (i) denotes driver who is ineligible for series driver points.

#	Driver	Team	Make
04	J. F. Dumoulin	Dumoulin Compétition	Dodge
1	Jean-Philippe Bergeron	Prolon Racing Team	Ford
3	Connor Bell (R)	Ed Hakonson Racing	Chevrolet
7	Raphaël Lessard	DJK Racing	Dodge
8	Justin Arseneau	Ed Hakonson Racing	Chevrolet
9	Mathieu Kingsbury	Innovation Auto Sport	Chevrolet
17	D. J. Kennington	DJK Racing	Dodge
24	Jared Odrick (R)	BC Race Cars	Ford
27	Andrew Ranger	Innovation Auto Sport	Chevrolet
36	Alex Labbé	LL Motorsports	Chevrolet
37	Simon Dion-Viens	SDV Autosport	Dodge
39	Alex Guenette	JASS Racing with XEMIS Racing	Chevrolet
45	Will Larue (R)	Larue Motorsports	Chevrolet
47	L. P. Dumoulin	Dumoulin Compétition	Dodge
50	Vittorio Ghirelli	Dumoulin Compétition	Chevrolet
53	Herby Drescher	Herby Motorsports	Dodge
54	Dave Coursol	Coursol Performance	Dodge
55	Serge Bordeau	BCM Motorsports	Dodge
69	Domenic Scrivo	MBS Motorsports	Chevrolet
73	Donald Theetge	Theetge Motorsports	Chevrolet
74	Kevin Lacroix	Innovation Auto Sport	Chevrolet
75	Benoît Couture	BCM Motorsports	Dodge
80	Alex Tagliani	Theetge Motorsports	Chevrolet
83	Martin Goulet Jr. (R)	Goulet Motorsports	Chevrolet
84	Larry Jackson	Larry Jackson Racing	Dodge
87	Sam Fellows	Fellows McGraw Racing	Chevrolet
88	Simon Charbonneau	Eighty8 Racing	Chevrolet
93	Jacques Guenette Sr. (R)	JASS Racing with XEMIS Racing	Chevrolet
94	Sylvain Ouellet (R)	Theetge Motorsports	Chevrolet
96	Marc-Antoine Camirand	Paillé Course//Racing	Chevrolet

== Practice ==
Practice was held on Saturday, August 7, at 8:40 AM EST. Alex Labbé set the fastest time with a lap of 1:08.196 and a speed of 80.292 mph (129.217 km/h).

Pos.	#	Driver	Team	Make	Time	Speed
1	36	Alex Labbé	LL Motorsports	Chevrolet	1:08.196	80.292
2	96	Marc-Antoine Camirand	Paillé Course//Racing	Chevrolet	1:08.202	80.285
3	27	Andrew Ranger	Innovation Auto Sport	Chevrolet	1:08.241	80.239
Full practice results

== Qualifying and Sprints ==
Qualifying was held on Saturday, August 7, at 12:00 PM EST. Qualifying determined the front row and the Omnifab Sprints starting lineup, and the sprints set the lineup for the race. Kevin Lacroix secured the pole for the sprint and main event with a lap of 1:08.256 and a speed of 80.222 mph (129.105 km/h), while Marc-Antoine Camirand secured second for main event and pole for the sprint with a lap of 1:08.267 and a speed of 80.209 mph (129.084 km/h). Camirand and Lacroix both won their sprints from the pole.

=== Qualifying results ===
Pos.	#	Driver	Team	Make	Time	Speed
1	74	Kevin Lacroix	Innovation Auto Sport	Chevrolet	1:08.256	80.222
2	96	Marc-Antoine Camirand	Paillé Course//Racing	Chevrolet	1:08.267	80.209
3	27	Andrew Ranger	Innovation Auto Sport	Chevrolet	1:08.284	80.189
4	88	Simon Charbonneau	Eighty8 Racing	Chevrolet	1:08.295	80.176
5	39	Alex Guenette	JASS Racing with XEMIS Racing	Chevrolet	1:08.448	79.996
6	36	Alex Labbé	LL Motorsports	Chevrolet	1:08.623	79.792
7	50	Vittorio Ghirelli	Dumoulin Compétition	Chevrolet	1:08.637	79.776
8	47	L. P. Dumoulin	Dumoulin Compétition	Dodge	1:08.701	79.702
9	80	Alex Tagliani	Theetge Motorsports	Chevrolet	1:08.741	79.656
10	45	Will Larue (R)	Larue Motorsports	Chevrolet	1:09.074	79.272
11	87	Sam Fellows	Fellows McGraw Racing	Chevrolet	1:09.246	79.075
12	17	D. J. Kennington	DJK Racing	Dodge	1:09.355	78.950
13	04	J. F. Dumoulin	Dumoulin Compétition	Dodge	1:09.387	78.914
14	9	Mathieu Kingsbury	Innovation Auto Sport	Chevrolet	1:09.421	78.875
15	7	Raphaël Lessard	DJK Racing	Dodge	1:09.518	78.765
16	3	Connor Bell (R)	Ed Hakonson Racing	Chevrolet	1:09.555	78.723
17	73	Donald Theetge	Theetge Motorsports	Chevrolet	1:09.609	78.662
18	8	Justin Arseneau (R)	Ed Hakonson Racing	Chevrolet	1:09.674	78.589
19	1	J. P. Bergeron	Prolon Racing Team	Ford	1:10.326	77.860
20	54	Dave Coursol	Coursol Performance	Dodge	1:10.553	77.630
21	37	Simon Dion-Viens	SDV Autosport	Dodge	1:10.648	77.505
22	53	Herby Drescher	Herby Motorsports	Dodge	1:10.945	77.181
23	83	Martin Goulet Jr. (R)	Goulet Motorsports	Chevrolet	1:11.042	77.076
24	69	Domenic Scrivo	MBS Motorsports	Chevrolet	1:12.266	75.770
25	94	Sylvain Ouellet (R)	Theetge Motorsports	Chevrolet	1:12.507	75.518
26	75	Ben Couture	BCM Motorsports	Dodge	1:12.616	75.405
27	55	Serge Bordeau	BCM Motorsports	Dodge	1:12.752	75.264
28	93	Jacques Guenette Sr. (R)	JASS Racing with XEMIS Racing	Chevrolet	1:16.235	71.825
29	84	Larry Jackson	Larry Jackson Racing	Dodge	1:17.449	70.699
30	24	Jared Odrick (R)	BC Race Cars	Ford	–	–
Full qualifying results

=== Sprint 1 results ===
Pos	St	#	Driver	Team	Make	Laps	Led	Status	Points
1	1	96	Marc-Antoine Camirand	Paillé Course//Racing	Chevrolet	15	15	Running	5
2	3	36	Alex Labbé	LL Motorsports	Chevrolet	15	0	Running	4
3	4	47	L. P. Dumoulin	Dumoulin Compétition	Dodge	15	0	Running	3
4	6	17	D. J. Kennington	DJK Racing	Dodge	15	0	Running	2
5	5	45	Will Larue (R)	Larue Motorsports	Chevrolet	15	0	Running	1
6	9	8	Justin Arseneau	Ed Hakonson Racing	Chevrolet	15	0	Running	0
7	2	88	Simon Charbonneau	Eighty8 Racing	Chevrolet	15	0	Running	0
8	8	8	Connor Bell (R)	Ed Hakonson Racing	Chevrolet	15	0	Running	0
9	11	53	Herby Drescher	Herby Motorsports	Dodge	15	0	Running	0
10	7	9	Mathieu Kingsbury	Innovation Auto Sport	Chevrolet	15	0	Running	0
11	15	24	Jared Odrick (R)	BC Race Cars	Ford	15	0	Running	0
12	12	69	Domenic Scrivo	MBS Motorsports	Chevrolet	14	0	Running	0
13	13	75	Ben Couture	BCM Motorsports	Dodge	14	0	Running	0
14	14	93	Jacques Guenette Sr. (R)	JASS Racing with XEMIS Racing	Chevrolet	14	0	Running	0
15	10	54	Dave Coursol	Coursol Performance	Dodge	7	0	DNF	0
Official race results

=== Sprint 2 Results ===
Pos	St	#	Driver	Team	Make	Laps	Led	Status	Points
1	1	74	Kevin Lacroix	Innovation Auto Sport	Chevrolet	15	15	Running	5
2	2	27	Andrew Ranger	Innovation Auto Sport	Chevrolet	15	0	Running	4
3	5	80	Alex Tagliani	Theetge Motorsports	Chevrolet	15	0	Running	3
4	3	39	Alex Guenette	JASS Racing with XEMIS Racing	Chevrolet	15	0	Running	2
5	4	50	Vittorio Ghirelli	Dumoulin Compétition	Chevrolet	15	0	Running	1
6	8	7	Raphaël Lessard	DJK Racing	Dodge	15	0	Running	0
7	7	04	J. F. Dumoulin	Dumoulin Compétition	Dodge	15	0	Running	0
8	6	87	Sam Fellows	Fellows McGraw Racing	Chevrolet	15	0	Running	0
9	10	1	J. P. Bergeron	Prolon Racing Team	Ford	15	0	Running	0
10	11	37	Simon Dion-Viens	SDV Autosport	Dodge	15	0	Running	0
11	12	83	Martin Goulet Jr. (R)	Goulet Motorsports	Chevrolet	15	0	Running	0
12	13	94	Sylvain Ouellet (R)	Theetge Motorsports	Chevrolet	15	0	Running	0
13	14	55	Serge Bordeau	BCM Motorsports	Chevrolet	14	0	Running	0
14	9	73	Donald Theetge	Theetge Motorsports	Chevrolet	9	0	DNF	0
15	15	84	Larry Jackson	Larry Jackson Racing	Dodge	4	0	DNF	0
Official race results

=== Starting lineup ===
Pos.	#	Driver	Team	Make	Notes
1	74	Kevin Lacroix	Innovation Auto Sport	Chevrolet	Fastest in pole qualifying, Sprint 2 winner
2	96	Marc-Antoine Camirand	Paillé Course//Racing	Chevrolet	Second in pole qualifying, Sprint 1 winner
3	27	Andrew Ranger	Innovation Auto Sport	Chevrolet	Second in Sprint 2
4	36	Alex Labbé	LL Motorsports	Chevrolet	Second in Sprint 1
5	80	Alex Tagliani	Theetge Motorsports	Chevrolet	Third in Sprint 2
6	47	L. P. Dumoulin	Dumoulin Compétition	Dodge	Third in Sprint 1
7	39	Alex Guenette	JASS Racing with XEMIS Racing	Chevrolet	Fourth in Sprint 2
8	17	D. J. Kennington	DJK Racing	Dodge	Fourth in Sprint 1
9	50	Vittorio Ghirelli	Dumoulin Compétition	Chevrolet	Fifth in Sprint 2
10	45	Will Larue (R)	Larue Motorsports	Chevrolet	Fifth in Sprint 1
11	7	Raphaël Lessard	DJK Racing	Dodge	Sixth in Sprint 2
12	8	Justin Arseneau	Ed Hakonson Racing	Chevrolet	Sixth in Sprint 1
13	04	J. F. Dumoulin	Dumoulin Compétition	Dodge	Seventh in Sprint 2
14	88	Simon Charbonneau	Eighty8 Racing	Chevrolet	Seventh in Sprint 1
15	87	Sam Fellows	Fellows McGraw Racing	Chevrolet	Eighth in Sprint 2
16	3	Connor Bell (R)	Ed Hakonson Racing	Chevrolet	Eighth in Sprint 1
17	1	J. P. Bergeron	Prolon Racing Team	Ford	Ninth in Sprint 2
18	53	Herby Drescher	Herby Motorsports	Dodge	Ninth in Sprint 1
19	37	Simon Dion-Viens	SDV Autosport	Dodge	Tenth in Sprint 2
20	9	Mathieu Kingsbury	Innovation Auto Sport	Chevrolet	Tenth in Sprint 1
21	83	Martin Goulet Jr. (R)	Goulet Motorsports	Chevrolet	Eleventh in Sprint 2
22	84	Larry Jackson	Larry Jackson Racing	Dodge	Fifteenth in Sprint 2
23	69	Domenic Scrivo	MBS Motorsports	Chevrolet	Twelfth in Sprint 1
24	54	Dave Coursol	Coursol Performance	Dodge	Fifteenth in Sprint 1
25	93	Jacques Guenette Sr. (R)	JASS Racing with XEMIS Racing	Chevrolet	Fourteenth in Sprint 1
26	73	Donald Theetge	Theetge Motorsports	Chevrolet	Fourteenth in Sprint 2
27	94	Sylvain Ouellet (R)	Theetge Motorsports	Chevrolet	Twelfth in Sprint 2
28	24	Jared Odrick (R)	BC Race Cars	Ford	Eleventh in Sprint 1
29	55	Serge Bordeau	BCM Motorsports	Dodge	Thirteenth in Sprint 2
30	75	Benoît Couture	BCM Motorsports	Dodge	Thirteenth in Sprint 1

== Race results ==
Pos	St	#	Driver	Team	Manufacturer	Laps	Led	Status	Points
1	2	96	Marc-Antoine Camirand	Paillé Course//Racing	Chevrolet	45	24	Running	58
2	6	47	L. P. Dumoulin	Dumoulin Compétition	Dodge	45	0	Running	45
3	7	39	Alex Guenette	JASS Racing with XEMIS Racing	Chevrolet	45	0	Running	45
4	3	27	Andrew Ranger	Innovation Auto Sport	Chevrolet	45	0	Running	44
5	11	7	Raphaël Lessard	DJK Racing	Dodge	45	0	Running	39
6	12	8	Justin Arseneau	Ed Hakonson Racing	Chevrolet	45	0	Running	38
7	26	73	Donald Theetge	Theetge Motorsports	Chevrolet	45	0	Running	37
8	19	37	Simon Dion-Viens	SDV Autosport	Dodge	45	0	Running	36
9	13	04	J. F. Dumoulin	Dumoulin Compétition	Dodge	45	0	Running	35
10	9	50	Vittorio Ghirelli	Dumoulin Compétition	Chevrolet	45	0	Running	35
11	24	54	Dave Coursol	Coursol Performance	Dodge	45	0	Running	33
12	22	84	Larry Jackson	Larry Jackson Racing	Dodge	45	0	Running	32
13	16	3	Connor Bell (R)	Ed Hakonson Racing	Chevrolet	45	0	Running	31
14	14	88	Simon Charbonneau	Eighty8 Racing	Chevrolet	45	0	Running	30
15	25	93	Jacques Guenette Sr. (R)	JASS Racing with XEMIS Racing	Chevrolet	45	0	Running	29
16	30	75	Benoît Couture	BCM Motorsports	Dodge	45	0	Running	28
17	27	94	Sylvain Ouellet (R)	Theetge Motorsports	Chevrolet	44	0	Running	27
18	10	45	Will Larue (R)	Larue Motorsports	Chevrolet	39	0	Electrical	28
19	21	83	Martin Goulet Jr. (R)	Goulet Motorsports	Chevrolet	38	0	Running	25
20	20	9	Mathieu Kingsbury	Innovation Auto Sport	Chevrolet	36	0	Accident	24
21	29	55	Serge Bordeau	BCM Motorsports	Dodge	35	0	Mechanical	23
22	28	24	Jared Odrick (R)	BC Race Cars	Ford	34	0	Accident	22
23	4	36	Alex Labbé	LL Motorsports	Chevrolet	30	0	Mechanical	25
24	5	80	Alex Tagliani	Theetge Motorsports	Chevrolet	29	0	Accident	23
25	17	1	J. P. Bergeron	Prolon Racing Team	Ford	29	0	Engine	19
26	1	74	Kevin Lacroix	Innovation Auto Sport	Chevrolet	22	21	Mechanical	24
27	18	53	Herby Drescher	Herby Motorsports	Dodge	14	0	Electrical	17
28	15	87	Sam Fellows	Fellows McGraw Racing	Chevrolet	13	0	Accident	16
29	8	17	D. J. Kennington	DJK Racing	Dodge	10	0	Mechanical	17
30	23	69	Domenic Scrivo	MBS Motorsports	Chevrolet	9	0	Accident	16

== Standings after the race ==
	Pos	Driver	Points
	1	Marc-Antoine Camirand	455
1	2	L. P. Dumoulin	379 (–76)
1	3	Kevin Lacroix	367 (–88)
	4	D. J. Kennington	340 (–115)
	5	Connor Bell	332 (–123)
1	6	Donald Theetge	327 (–128)
1	7	Alex Tagliani	319 (–136)
1	8	Larry Jackson	308 (–147)
1	9	Will Larue	307 (–148)
	10	Andrew Ranger	302 (–153)

Previous race: 2026 Carlyle Tools 150 (points); 2026 Omnifab Sprints (exhibition)	NASCAR Canada Series; 2026 season	Next race: 2026 Markham 125
