= Edmonton International Raceway =

Auto racing facility

EIR
- Location: 244047 Township Road 464, County of Wetaskiwin No. 10, Alberta
- Coordinates: 52°59′16″N 113°27′8″W
- Capacity: 5,000
- Owner: Wetaskiwin Stock Car Club (1967–present)
- Operator: Ron & Loretta Thiering (HMS) (March 1995–present); Wetaskiwin Stock Car Club (1967–1994)
- Opened: 1967
- Former names: Sunset Speedway (1967–2005)
- Major events: Current: NASCAR Canada Series; Dorman Products 150 (2014–2019, 2022–present); Carlyle Tools 150 (2026–present); NASCAR Advance Auto Parts Weekly Series (2005–present); Former: CASCAR West Series (2002–2006); CASCAR Super Series (1998–2000)
- Website: http://www.edmontonraceway.com/

Paved oval (1994–present)
- Surface: Asphalt
- Length: 0.402 km (0.250 mi)

Dirt oval (1967–1993)
- Surface: Clay
- Length: 0.402 km (0.250 mi)

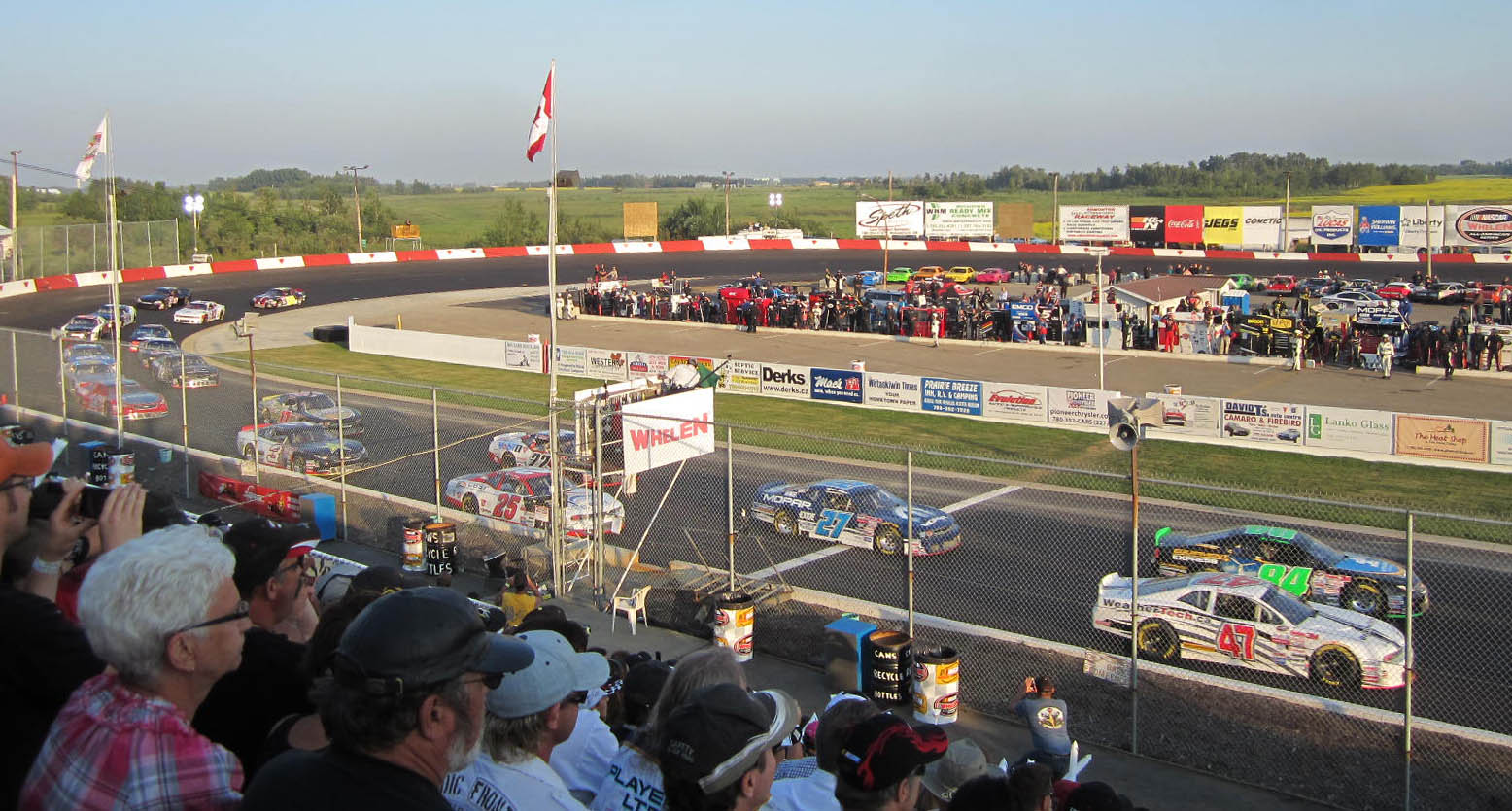
2014 Alberta Has Energy 300 opening green flag

Edmonton International Raceway is a 0.250 mi (0.402 km), paved oval auto racing facility, outside Wetaskiwin, Alberta, Canada, approximately 72 kilometres (45 mi) south of Edmonton. The track is the first in Alberta to be sanctioned by NASCAR, and hosts races in the NASCAR Advance Auto Parts Weekly Series. It hosted its first NASCAR Pinty's Series race in 2014. On July 26 and 27, 2024, it hosted a newly branded NASCAR Canada Series event, the only NASCAR event in Alberta.

Edmonton International Raceway hosts the only race car experience on a NASCAR track in Western Canada.

The CASCAR West Series ran five races at the track between 2002 and 2006.
