= Sutherland Automotive Speedway =

Motor speedway in Saskatoon, Saskatchewan

- Location: Saskatoon, Saskatchewan
- Coordinates: 52°13′06″N 106°39′39″W
- Capacity: Grandstand: 3,319
- Owner: Saskatoon Stock Car Racing Ass. (2006–present)
- Operator: Saskatoon Stock Car Racing Ass. (2006–present)
- Broke ground: April 2005; 20 years ago
- Opened: June 2006; 19 years ago
- Former names: Auto Clearing Motor Speedway; Wyant Group Raceway
- Major events: Former: NASCAR Canada Series; Leland Industries 250 (2009–2019, 2022–2025); CASCAR West Series (2006)
- Website: https://sutherlandautomotivespeedway.ca/

Paved Oval (2006–present)
- Surface: Asphalt
- Length: 0.536 km (0.333 mi)
- Banking: Progressive banking Straightaways: 5° Corners: 7, 9.5, 11°

Sutherland Automotive Speedway (formerly Wyant Group Raceway and Auto Clearing Motor Speedway) is a paved oval auto racing facility just north of Saskatoon, Saskatchewan, Canada. It is owned and operated by the Saskatoon Stock Car Racing Association Ltd. (SSCRA).

SSCRA was formed in 1954 and initially operated out of the 8th Street Racing Oval, The Motordrome, near what is now McKercher Drive and Moss Avenue in Saskatoon. The Motordrome's last year of operation was 1969, after which it was removed to make way for residential development.

The SSCRA ran out of the Exhibition grounds grandstand in 1970, but area residents complained about the noise, dust and traffic. The SSCRA subsequently made a deal to purchase land for Bridge City Speedway in what is now the Evergreen neighborhood of Saskatoon.

The original Bridge City Speedway, located southeast of Saskatoon, was in operation from 1971 until 2005. The city annexed the property in 2000, incorporating it into the city limits. The SSCRA was notified at that time that the land would be re-allocated for development and they must look at relocating again.

In 2004, SSCRA acquired a new 35-acre (140,000 m^{2}) site just north of the city limits, near the junction of Highways 11 and 12. Construction of the new 0.333 mi (0.536 km) walled track with progressive banking began April 2005. The track opened in July 2006, a year ahead of schedule.

Sutherland Automotive Speedway has several racing classes, they are Sport Compact Mini Stock, Pro Truck, Sportsman, Street Stock, Pro Late Model, Legends, and Bandeleros, but its premier event is the NASCAR Canada Series. The NASCAR Canada series has made a stop in Saskatoon for a Wednesday night race, the Bayer Crop Sciences Velocity Prairie Thunder, since 2009. The schedule was interrupted in 2020 and 2021 by the Coronavirus Covid 19 pandemic, but is back on the schedule for 2022 with the Leland Industries Twin 125's on July 27, 2022.
