= Circuit ICAR =

Motorsports complex in Mirabel, Quebec

International Center of Advanced Racing (ICAR)
The Ultimate Motorsports Complex
- Location: Montréal–Mirabel International Airport, Mirabel, Quebec
- Coordinates: 45°40′53.04″N 74°01′25.32″W
- Capacity: more than 20,000
- Opened: May 2008; 18 years ago
- Major events: Current: Super Production Challenge (2011–present); NASCAR Canada Series; NAPA 100 (2011–2017, 2021, 2023–present); Former: Sports Car Championship Canada (2021); Canadian Touring Car Championship (2008–2018); IMSA GT3 Cup Challenge Canada (2011); Canadian Superbike Championship (2009–2011)
- Website: https://icarexperience.ca/en/

Road Course (2008–present)
- Surface: Asphalt
- Length: 2.125 mi (3.420 km)
- Turns: 16
- Race lap record: 1:22.900 ( (Canada) Brett McCormick, BMW S1000RR, 2011, SBK)

Oval (2008–present)
- Surface: Asphalt
- Length: 0.249 mi (0.400 km)
- Turns: 4

Drag Strip (2008–present)
- Length: 0.250 mi (0.402 km)

Kart Track (2008–present)
- Length: 0.62 mi (1 km)
- Turns: 14

Driftpark
- Surface: Tarmac
- Banking: 54 000 sq.ft

The International Center of Advanced Racing (Circuit ICAR) is a multi-track facility located on the former runways at Montréal–Mirabel International Airport, in Mirabel, Quebec, Canada north of Montreal. The facility features a 2.125 mi (3.420 km), 16-turn road course, a 0.400 mi (0.644 km) oval, a 0.250 mi (0.402 km) drag strip, two kart tracks, a driftpark and an offroad course.

The facility opened in May 2008 as a private motorsport country club, and was opened to the general public in 2009 with the opening of the ICAR Racing Academy, and a karting track designed by Formula One World Champion Jacques Villeneuve.

Circuit ICAR now hosts weekly drag racing events, lapping nights, car clubs and major Canadian race series including the Canadian Touring Car Championship and the NASCAR Canada Series.

== Lap records ==
As of August 2021, the fastest official race lap records at Circuit ICAR are listed as:

Category	Time	Driver	Vehicle	Event
Full Circuit (2008–present): 3.420 km (2.125 mi)
Superbike	1:22.900	Brett McCormick	BMW S1000RR	2011 Mirabel CSBK round
Supersport	1:25.366	Brett McCormick	Suzuki GSX-R600	2009 Mirabel CSBK round
Radical Cup	1:28.747	Nickoli Roussakov	Radical SR3 SRX	2021 Mirabel Radical Cup Canada round
GT4	1:31.032	Marco Signoretti	Ford Mustang GT4	2021 Mirabel Sports Car Championship Canada round
TCR Touring Car	1:32.050	Nick Looijmans	Audi RS 3 LMS TCR (2021)	2021 Mirabel Sports Car Championship Canada round
Porsche Carrera Cup	1:36.826	Perry Bortolotti	Porsche 911 (997 II) GT3 Cup	2011 Mirabel Porsche GT3 Cup Challenge Canada round

== NASCAR Oval Track Record ==
Year	Date	Driver	Team	Car	Time	Series
2021	April 23	(Canada) Daniel Descoste	Destroy Brothers	Chevrolet Camaro	17.067 sec	NASCAR Sportsman
2021	May 12	(Canada) Frederik Ladouceur	LadouRacing	Honda Civic	19.236 sec	NASCAR Sport Compacte Élite

== See also ==
- List of auto racing tracks in Canada
- Other Montreal area race tracks
  - Circuit Gilles Villeneuve
  - Circuit Mont-Tremblant
  - Sanair Super Speedway
