= Autodrome Chaudière =

Race track

- Location: 71 Route 112 West, Vallée-Jonction, Québec
- Coordinates: 46°22′20″N 70°56′33″W
- Capacity: 5,000
- Owner: Dany Lagacé and Kevin Roberge
- Opened: 1992
- Major events: Current: NASCAR Canada Series; Bud Light 125 (2014–2019, 2022–present); Michelob Ultra 125 (2026–present); American Canadian Tour (2015, 2019, 2022–present)
- Website: https://autodromechaudiere.ca/

Paved Oval (2005–present)
- Surface: Asphalt
- Length: 0.402 km (0.250 mi)
- Turns: 4

Dirt Oval (1992–2004)
- Surface: Dirt
- Length: 0.402 km (0.250 mi)
- Turns: 4

Autodrome Chaudière is a 0.250 mi (0.402 km), high banked, asphalt short track located in Vallée-Jonction, Quebec, Canada, about 65 km (40 mi) south of Quebec City.

The circuit opened in 1992 as a dirt track; in 2005, the track underwent resurfacing to convert it into an asphalt track. Notable series which have competed at Autodrome Chaudiere include the ACT Castrol Series, PASS North Series, ISMA Racing Series and Sportsman Quebec. The track has also hosted a NASCAR Canada Series race every year since June 2014 (except for 2020 and 2021). The track record, 10.77 seconds, was established on 22 June 2013 by American driver Ben Seitz from the ISMA Racing Series.

== See also ==
- NASCAR Canada Series at Autodrome Chaudière
