= Kelly Admiraal =

Canadian racing driver (born 1995)

- Born: April 27, 1995 (age 31); Sherwood Park, Alberta, Canada

NASCAR O'Reilly Auto Parts Series career
- 4 races run over 2 years
- 2014 position: 48th
- Best finish: 48th (2014)
- First race: 2013 ServiceMaster 200 (Phoenix)
- Last race: 2014 DAV 200 (Phoenix)
Wins	Top tens	Poles
0	0	0

NASCAR Canada Series career
- 6 races run over 3 years
- 2016 position: 22nd
- Best finish: 22nd (2016)
- First race: 2012 Edmonton 100 (Edmonton)
- Last race: 2016 Bumper to Bumper 300 (Riverside)
Wins	Top tens	Poles
0	1	0

Kelly Admiraal (born April 27, 1995) is a Canadian professional stock car racing driver. He last competed part-time in the NASCAR Nationwide Series, driving the No. 29 for RAB Racing.

== Motorsports career results ==
=== NASCAR ===
(key) (Bold – Pole position awarded by qualifying time. Italics – Pole position earned by points standings or practice time. * – Most laps led.)

==== Nationwide Series ====
NASCAR Nationwide Series results
Year	Team	No.	Make	1	2	3	4	5	6	7	8	9	10	11	12	13	14	15	16	17	18	19	20	21	22	23	24	25	26	27	28	29	30	31	32	33	NNSC	Pts	Ref
2013	SR² Motorsports	24	Toyota	DAY	PHO	LVS	BRI	CAL	TEX	RCH	TAL	DAR	CLT	DOV	IOW	MCH	ROA	KEN	DAY	NHA	CHI	IND	IOW	GLN	MOH	BRI	ATL	RCH	CHI	KEN	DOV	KAN	CLT	TEX	PHO; 31	HOM	82nd	13	
2014	RAB Racing	29	Toyota	DAY	PHO	LVS	BRI; 35	CAL	TEX	DAR	RCH	TAL	IOW	CLT	DOV	MCH	ROA	KEN	DAY	NHA	CHI	IND	IOW	GLN	MOH	BRI	ATL	RCH; 22	CHI	KEN	DOV	KAN	CLT	TEX	PHO; 22	HOM	48th	51	

==== K&N Pro Series West ====
NASCAR K&N Pro Series West results
Year	Team	No.	Make	1	2	3	4	5	6	7	8	9	10	11	12	13	14	15	NKNPSWC	Pts	Ref
2012	Admiraal Racing	83	Chevy	PHO	LHC	MMP	S99	IOW	BIR	LVS	SON	EVG	CNS	IOW	PIR	SMP; 11	AAS; DNQ	PHO; 28	39th	67	
2013	Admiraal Racing	83	Chevy	PHO; 23	S99	BIR	IOW	L44	SON; 7	CNS	IOW	EVG; 17	SPO	MMP	SMP	AAS	KCR	PHO; 7	22nd	123	
2014	Admiraal Racing	83	Chevy	PHO; 19	IRW	S99	IOW; 6	KCR	SON	SLS	CNS	IOW	EVG	KCR; 14	MMP	AAS	PHO; 14		19th	123	

==== Pinty's Series ====
NASCAR Pinty's Series results
Year	Team	No.	Make	1	2	3	4	5	6	7	8	9	10	11	12	NPSC	Pts	Ref
2012	Admiraal Racing	83	Chevy	MSP	ICAR	MSP	DEL	MPS	EDM; 21	SAS	CTR	CGV	BAR	RIS	KWA	54th	23	
2013	Admiraal Racing	83	Chevy	MSP	DEL	MSP	ICAR	MPS; 17	SAS; 14	ASE	CTR	RIS	MSP	BAR	KWA	35th	57	
2016	Bray Racing	56	Dodge	MSP	SSS	ACD	ICAR	TOR	EIR; 8	SAS; 11	CTR	RIS; 11	MSP	ASE	KWA	22nd	102	
