= Cayden Lapcevich =

NASCAR Canada Series driver (born 1999)

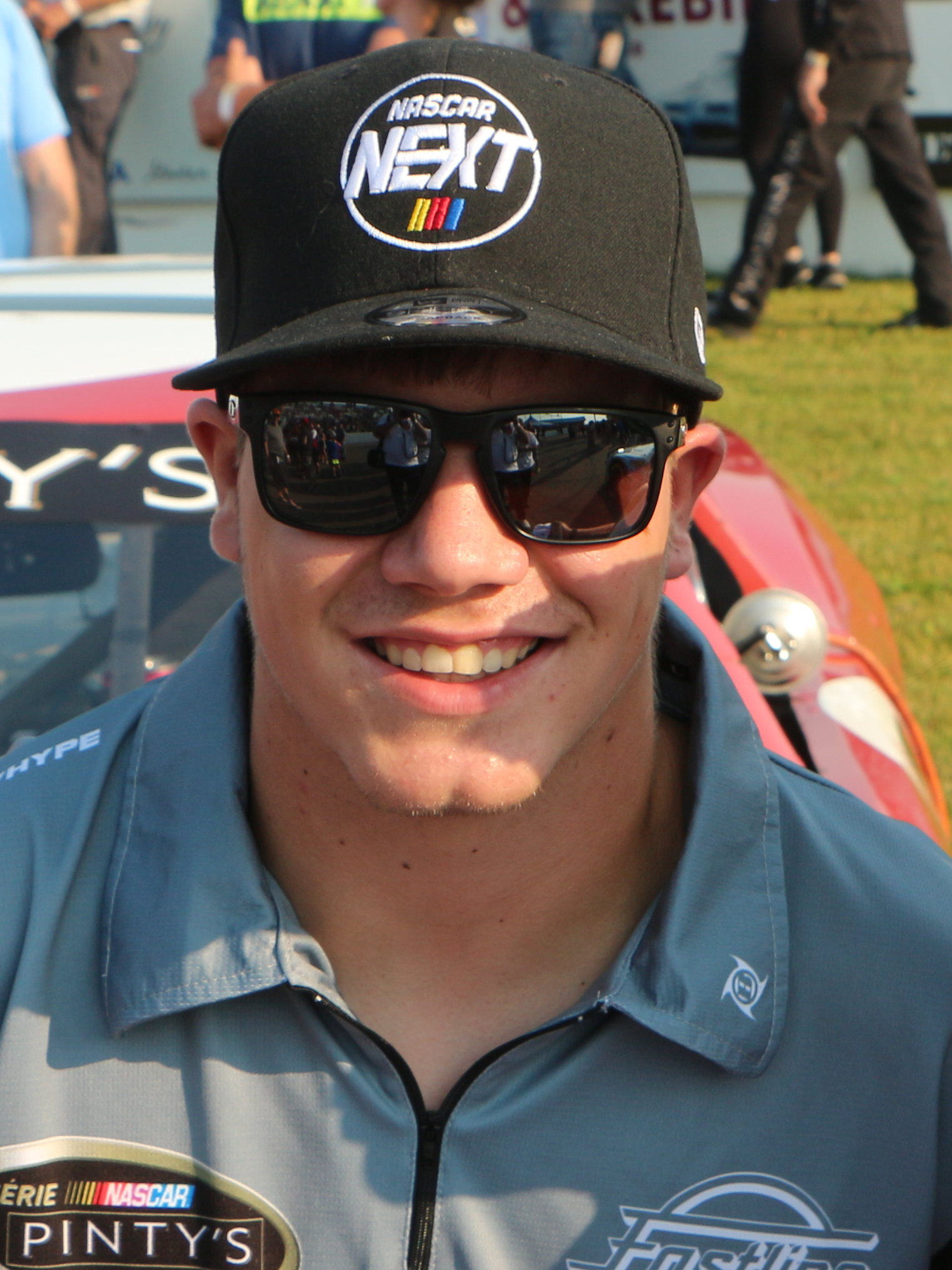
- Lapcevich in 2025
- Born: November 3, 1999 (age 27); Grimsby, Ontario, Canada
- Achievements: 2016 NASCAR Pinty's Series champion

NASCAR Canada Series career
- 35 races run over 5 years
- Car no., team: No. 76 (Glenn Styres Racing with Velocity Race Cars)
- 2026 position: 39th
- Best finish: 1st (2016)
- First race: 2015 Clarington 200 (May) (Bowmanville)
- Last race: 2026 NTN BCA 200 (Delaware)
- First win: 2016 Prairie Velocity Thunder 250 (Saskatoon)
- Last win: 2017 Pinty's Fall Brawl (Hamilton)
Wins	Top tens	Poles
6	27	1
- Statistics up to date as of September 13, 2026.

Cayden Lapcevich (born 3 November 1999) is a Canadian professional stock car racing driver and crew chief who last served as the crew chief for the No. 19 Chevrolet for Jake Bollman and Bill McAnally Racing in the ARCA Menards Series West. He competes part-time in the NASCAR Canada Series, driving the No. 76 Chevrolet for Glenn Styres Racing with Velocity Race Cars

Lapcevich is a former competitor in the NASCAR Canada Series, having competed from 2015 to 2017 and again in 2024. During his career, Lapcevich won the 2016 NASCAR Pinty's Series championship with three wins and was the "youngest champion ever in Canadian professional auto racing". During the 2016 season, Lapevich was named the Jostens Rookie of the Year. After winning three additional races in his final full time Pinty's season, Lapcevich was awarded the Canadian Motorsport Hall of Fame Rising Star Award in 2017. Outside of competing, Lapcevich was a crew chief for Andrew Ranger in 2022.

== Early life and education ==
On 3 November 1999, Lapcevich was born in Grimsby, Ontario. For his post-secondary education, Lapcevich went to the University of Northwestern Ohio to complete a program in racecar construction.

== Career ==
Lapcevich began his motorsport throughout his childhood in road racing. He later won multiple midget car racing championships before settling on stock car racing. Between 2014 and 2015, Lapcevich won the Ontario Super Stock championship before entering the NASCAR Pinty's Series. In Lapcevich's first Pinty's Series season, he competed in six races and had one top five finish in 2015.

The following season, Lapcevich won the 2016 NASCAR Pinty's Series championship with three race wins and was the "youngest champion ever in Canadian professional auto racing". That year, he received the Jostens Rookie of the Year award. Before the start of the 2017 NASCAR Pinty's Series season, Lapcevich was selected as a member of the NASCAR Next developmental program. After winning three additional races during the 2017 Pinty's Series, Lapcevich ended his NASCAR career in 2018 when his sponsor went bankrupt. He appeared in limited races such as the 2018 Canadian Short Track Nationals while attending college.

Lapcevich then raced at select events in the United States. He won the late model portion of the 2019 Glass City 200 at Toledo Speedway. He took second to Ty Majeski at the 2020 Dixieland 250 ARCA Midwest Tour race at Wisconsin International Raceway in August ahead of drivers such as Kyle Busch, Johnny Sauter, and Derek Kraus. In 2022, Lapecvich became a crew chief for Andrew Ranger.

In 2024, Lapcevich replaced an injured Toni Breidinger during the race in the ARCA Menards Series race at Watkins Glen, however, as Breidinger started the race, she is credited with the 17th-place finish. Lapcevich also returned to the now NASCAR Canada Series for the first time since 2017, running two races in the No. 32 Chevrolet.

== Personal life ==
Lapcevich's younger brother Treyten is the 2023 NASCAR Pinty's Series champion and made his ARCA Menards Series debut in 2025. Cayden's father Jeff was also a driver in the CASCAR Super Series, CASCAR East, CASCAR West and NASCAR Pinty's Series. Jeff also raced in the Grand-Am Road Racing Series.

== Awards and honours ==
In 2017, Lapcevich was given the Canadian Motorsport Hall of Fame Rising Star Award.

== Motorsports career results ==
=== NASCAR ===
(key) (Bold – Pole position awarded by qualifying time. Italics – Pole position earned by points standings or practice time. * – Most laps led.)

==== Canada Series ====
NASCAR Canada Series results
Year	Team	No.	Make	1	2	3	4	5	6	7	8	9	10	11	12	13	14	NCSC	Pts	Ref
2015	Lapcevich Racing	34	Dodge	MSP; 17									MSP; 9					14th	197	
2015	Lapcevich Racing	76	Dodge		ACD; 18	SSS; 3	ICAR	EIR	SAS	ASE	CTR; 15	RIS		KWA; 6				14th	197	
2016	Lapcevich Racing	76	Dodge	MSP; 4	**SSS**; 2	ACD; 2	ICAR; 8	TOR; 8	EIR; 3	SAS; 1*	CTR; 6	RIS; 1	MSP; 3	ASE; 1	KWA; 2			1st	505	
2017	Lapcevich Racing	76	Dodge	MSP; 4	DEL; 12	ACD; 1*	ICAR; 16	TOR; 7	SAS; 3	SAS; 1	EIR; 3	CTR; 7	RIS; 9	MSP; 11	ASE; 3	HAM; 1		3rd	509	
2024	Ryden Lapcevich	32	Chevy	MSP	ACD	AVE	RIS	RIS	OSK; 6	SAS	EIR	CTR	ICAR	MSP	DEL; 13	AMS		39th	69	
2026	Glenn Styres Racing with Velocity Race Cars	76	Chevy	MSP	ACD	ACD	RIS	AMS	AMS	CMP	EIR	EIR	CTR	MAR	ICAR	MSP; 3	DEL; 13	39th	72	

=== ARCA Menards Series ===
(key) (Bold – Pole position awarded by qualifying time. Italics – Pole position earned by points standings or practice time. * – Most laps led.)

ARCA Menards Series results
Year	Team	No.	Make	1	2	3	4	5	6	7	8	9	10	11	12	13	14	15	16	17	18	19	20	AMSC	Pts	Ref
2024	Venturini Motorsports	25	Toyota	DAY	PHO	TAL	DOV	KAN	CLT	IOW	MOH	BLN	IRP	SLM	ELK	MCH	ISF	MLW	DSF	GLN; RL^{†}	BRI	KAN	TOL	N/A	0	
^{†} – Relieved for Toni Breidinger

=== SMART Modified Tour ===
SMART Modified Tour results
Year	Car owner	No.	Make	1	2	3	4	5	6	7	8	9	10	11	12	13	14	SMTC	Pts	Ref
2023	N/A	76	N/A	FLO	CRW	SBO	HCY	FCS	CRW	ACE	CAR	PUL	TRI	SBO	ROU; 7			42nd	36	
2025	Marty Edwards	39	N/A	FLO	AND	SBO	ROU	HCY	FCS	CRW	CPS	CAR	CRW; 14	DOM	FCS	TRI; 6	NWS; 14	25th	93	
2026	Cayden Lapcevich	13	N/A	FLO	AND; 14	SBO	DOM	HCY	WKS	FCR	CRW	PUL; 3	CAR	ROU; 1*	TRI; 2	NWS		20th	154	
