= Gary Klutt =

Canadian racing driver (born 1992)

- Born: Gary T. Klutt; August 14, 1992 (age 34); Halton Hills, Ontario, Canada

NASCAR Cup Series career
- 1 race run over 1 year
- 2017 position: 42nd
- Best finish: 42nd (2017)
- First race: 2017 I Love New York 355 at The Glen (Watkins Glen)
Wins	Top tens	Poles
0	0	0

NASCAR FedEx Freight Truck Series career
- 3 races run over 3 years
- 2019 position: 69th
- Best finish: 50th (2016)
- First race: 2016 Chevrolet Silverado 250 (Mosport)
- Last race: 2019 Chevrolet Silverado 250 (Mosport)
Wins	Top tens	Poles
0	0	0

NASCAR Canada Series career
- 70 races run over 14 years
- Car no., team: No. 71 (Legendary Motorcar Company)
- 2026 position: 21st
- Best finish: 6th (2015)
- First race: 2010 Vortex Brake Pads 200 (Mosport)
- Last race: 2026 WeatherTech 200 (Mosport)
- First win: 2015 Clarington 200 (Mosport)
- Last win: 2026 CarGurus 200 (Mosport)
Wins	Top tens	Poles
2	46	7
- Statistics up to date as of September 13, 2026.

Gary T. Klutt (born August 14, 1992) is a Canadian professional stock car racing driver and a member of the 2016 NASCAR Next class. He is also the host of the Gary Klutt Podcast. He currently competes part-time in the NASCAR Canada Series, driving the No. 71 Dodge Challenger for Legendary Motorcar Company. He also co-hosts the Canadian reality television show Legendary Motorcar with his father. In 2025, Klutt joined REV TV as an analyst for select Canada Series races. He has also raced in the NASCAR Cup Series and NASCAR Craftsman Truck Series.

== Racing career ==
=== Pinty's Series ===
==== Early years ====
Klutt began his racing career in 2000, finding success quickly, winning karting championships in 2003, 2004, 2005, and 2007 and the Canadian Nationals in 2009.

Debuting in 2010 at Canadian Tire Motorsport Park, Klutt qualified sixteenth and finished eleventh in his family No. 68 entry. He did not return to the series until 2013, running another race at CTMP, starting seventh and finishing seventh in a family-entered No. 59 car. The team entered four races in 2014, running top tens at Circuit ICAR and CTMP, and falling out of one race with mechanical issues.

==== Full-time ====
Klutt started racing full-time in 2015, starting from the pole and winning the season-opening race at CTMP in only his seventh series start. He garnered one other pole and six other top-tens en route to a fifth-place points finish. He also garnered Rookie of the Year honors. 2016 brought a bit less success, as Klutt raced his way to eight top-tens but not one top-five finish and failed to finish two races. Also during the 2016 season, Klutt was named to the 2016 NASCAR Next class. He returned to full-time racing for the 2022 season, finishing ninth in the point standings with four top-fives and eight top-tens.

==== Post full-time ====
After the 2016 season, Klutt picked up other obligations and started running part-time again, focusing on crown jewel road course races. He continued with his family Legendary Motorcar team, sometimes driving the hauler to the track.

=== Gander Outdoors Truck Series ===
During his 2016 Pinty's season, Klutt signed on with Kyle Busch Motorsports to run a NASCAR Camping World Truck Series race at Canadian Tire Motorsport Park, the track at which he had experienced the most success in the Pinty's series. Klutt was a sub for Cody Coughlin, who could not drive the race. Klutt said he wanted a chance to race trucks at CTMP ever since 2013. During the race, Klutt improved four spots on his qualifying position to finish 11th.

=== Monster Energy Cup Series ===
On August 6, 2017, Klutt made his Monster Energy NASCAR Cup Series debut at Watkins Glen International, where he drove the No. 15 Chevrolet for Premium Motorsports. He qualified 34th and finished 31st, one lap behind race winner Martin Truex Jr.

== Personal life ==
Klutt works for his family reality television show Legendary Motorcar, which is shown internationally (U. S. on Velocity and in other countries, Discovery World). His other interests include real estate.

== Motorsports career results ==
=== NASCAR ===
(key) (Bold – Pole position awarded by qualifying time. Italics – Pole position earned by points standings or practice time. * – Most laps led.)

==== Monster Energy Cup Series ====
Monster Energy NASCAR Cup Series results
Year	Team	No.	Make	1	2	3	4	5	6	7	8	9	10	11	12	13	14	15	16	17	18	19	20	21	22	23	24	25	26	27	28	29	30	31	32	33	34	35	36	MENCC	Pts	Ref
2017	Premium Motorsports	15	Chevy	DAY	ATL	LVS	PHO	CAL	MAR	TEX	BRI	RCH	TAL	KAN	CLT	DOV	POC	MCH	SON	DAY	KEN	NHA	IND	POC	GLN; 31	MCH	BRI	DAR	RCH	CHI	NHA	DOV	CLT	TAL	KAN	MAR	TEX	PHO	HOM	42nd	6	

==== Gander Outdoors Truck Series ====
NASCAR Gander Outdoors Truck Series results
Year	Team	No.	Make	1	2	3	4	5	6	7	8	9	10	11	12	13	14	15	16	17	18	19	20	21	22	23	NGOTC	Pts	Ref
2016	Kyle Busch Motorsports	51	Toyota	DAY	ATL	MAR	KAN	DOV	CLT	TEX	IOW	GTW	KEN	ELD	POC	BRI	MCH	MSP; 11	CHI	NHA	LVS	TAL	MAR	TEX	PHO	HOM	50th	22	
2017	Premium Motorsports	49	Chevy	DAY	ATL	MAR	KAN	CLT	DOV	TEX	GTW	IOW	KEN	ELD	POC	MCH	BRI	MSP; 24	CHI	NHA	LVS	TAL	MAR	TEX	PHO	HOM	94th	0^{1}	
2019	Niece Motorsports	44	Chevy	DAY	ATL	LVS	MAR	TEX	DOV	KAN	CLT	TEX	IOW	GTW	CHI	KEN	POC	ELD	MCH	BRI	MSP; 12	LVS	TAL	MAR	PHO	HOM	69th	25	

==== Canada Series ====
NASCAR Canada Series results
Year	Team	No.	Make	1	2	3	4	5	6	7	8	9	10	11	12	13	14	NPSC	Pts	Ref
2010	Legendary Motorcar Company	68	Chevy	DEL	MSP; 11	ASE	TOR	EDM	MPS	SAS	CTR	MSP	CGV	BAR	RIS	KWA		46th	130	
2013	Legendary Motorcar Company	59	Chevy	MSP	DEL	MSP	ICAR	MPS	SAS	ASE	CTR	RIS	MSP; 7	BAR	KWA			46th	37	
2014	Legendary Motorcar Company	59	Chevy	MSP	ACD	ICAR; 8	EIR	SAS	ASE	CTR; 28	RIS	MSP; 6	BAR					25th	112	
2014	Legendary Motorcar Company	61	Dodge											KWA; 22				25th	112	
2015	Legendary Motorcar Company	59	Chevy	**MSP**; 1			ICAR; 8				CTR; 22		MSP; 11					6th	383	
2015	Legendary Motorcar Company	59	Dodge		ACD; 7	**SSS**; 6		EIR; 10	SAS; 14	ASE; 7		RIS; 8		KWA; 11				6th	383	
2016	Legendary Motorcar Company	59	Dodge	MSP; 10	SSS; 13	ACD; 13	ICAR; 7	TOR; 6	EIR; 9	SAS; 7	CTR; 22	RIS; 13	MSP; 6	ASE; 7	KWA; 9			8th	407	
2017	Legendary Motorcar Company	59	Dodge	MSP; 3	DEL	ACD	ICAR	TOR; 9	SAS; 5	SAS; 10	EIR	CTR; 13	RIS	MSP; 8	ASE	JUK		14th	216	
2018	Legendary Motorcar Company	59	Dodge	MSP; 19	JUK	ACD	TOR; 4	SAS	SAS	EIR	CTR	RIS	MSP; 7	ASE	NHA	JUK		22nd	103	
2019	Legendary Motorcar Company	59	Dodge	**MSP**; 3	JUK	ACD	TOR; 17	SAS	SAS	EIR	CTR	RIS	MSP; 11	ASE	NHA	JUK		25th	103	
2021	Legendary Motorcar Company	59	Dodge	SUN	SUN	CTR	ICAR	**MSP**; 5*	MSP; 6	FLA	FLA	DEL	DEL					28th	80	
2022	Legendary Motorcar Company	59	Dodge	SUN; 6	MSP; 4	ACD; 7	AVE; 5	TOR; 4	EDM; 7	SAS; 14	SAS; 21	CTR; 11	OSK; 9	ICAR; 21	MSP; 3	DEL; 26		9th	234	
2023	Legendary Motorcar Company	59	Dodge	SUN	MSP; 3	ACD	AVE	TOR; 23	EIR	SAS	SAS	CTR; 4	OSK	OSK	ICAR	MSP; 24	DEL	23rd	125	
2024	Legendary Motorcar Company	59	Dodge	**MSP**; 2	ACD	AVE	RIS	RIS	OSK	SAS	EIR	CTR	ICAR	MSP; 8	DEL	AMS		36th	79	
2025	Legendary Motorcar Company	59	Dodge	MSP; 2	RIS	EDM	SAS	**CMP**; 16	ACD	CTR; 18	ICAR	MSP; 9	DEL	DEL	AMS			19th	133	
2026	Legendary Motorcar Company	71	Dodge	**MSP**; 1*	ACD	ACD	RIS	AMS	AMS	CMP; 5	EIR	EIR	CTR	MAR; 6	ICAR	MSP; 6	DEL	21st	163	

==== K&N Pro Series East ====
NASCAR K&N Pro Series East results
Year	Team	No.	Make	1	2	3	4	5	6	7	8	9	10	11	12	13	14	NKNPSEC	Pts	Ref
2017	Calabrese Motorsports	43	Toyota	NSM	GRE	BRI	SBO	SBO	MEM	BLN	TMP	NHA	IOW	GLN; 13	LGY	NJM	DOV	58th	31	

^{*} Season still in progress
^{1} Ineligible for series points
