= 2016 NASCAR Pinty's Series =

Seasons
- ← 2015 2017 →

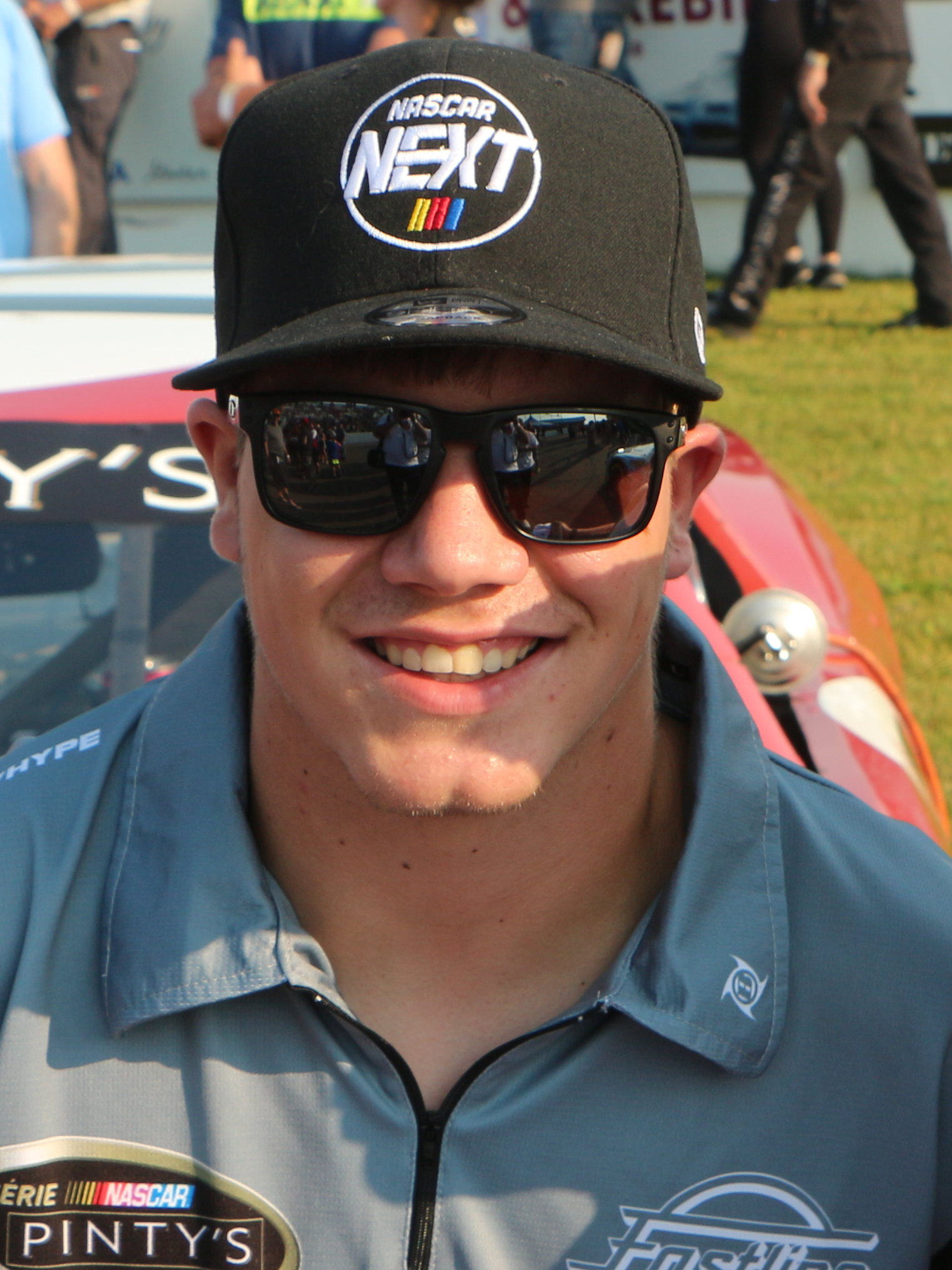
Cayden Lapcevich, the 2016 Pinty's Series champion

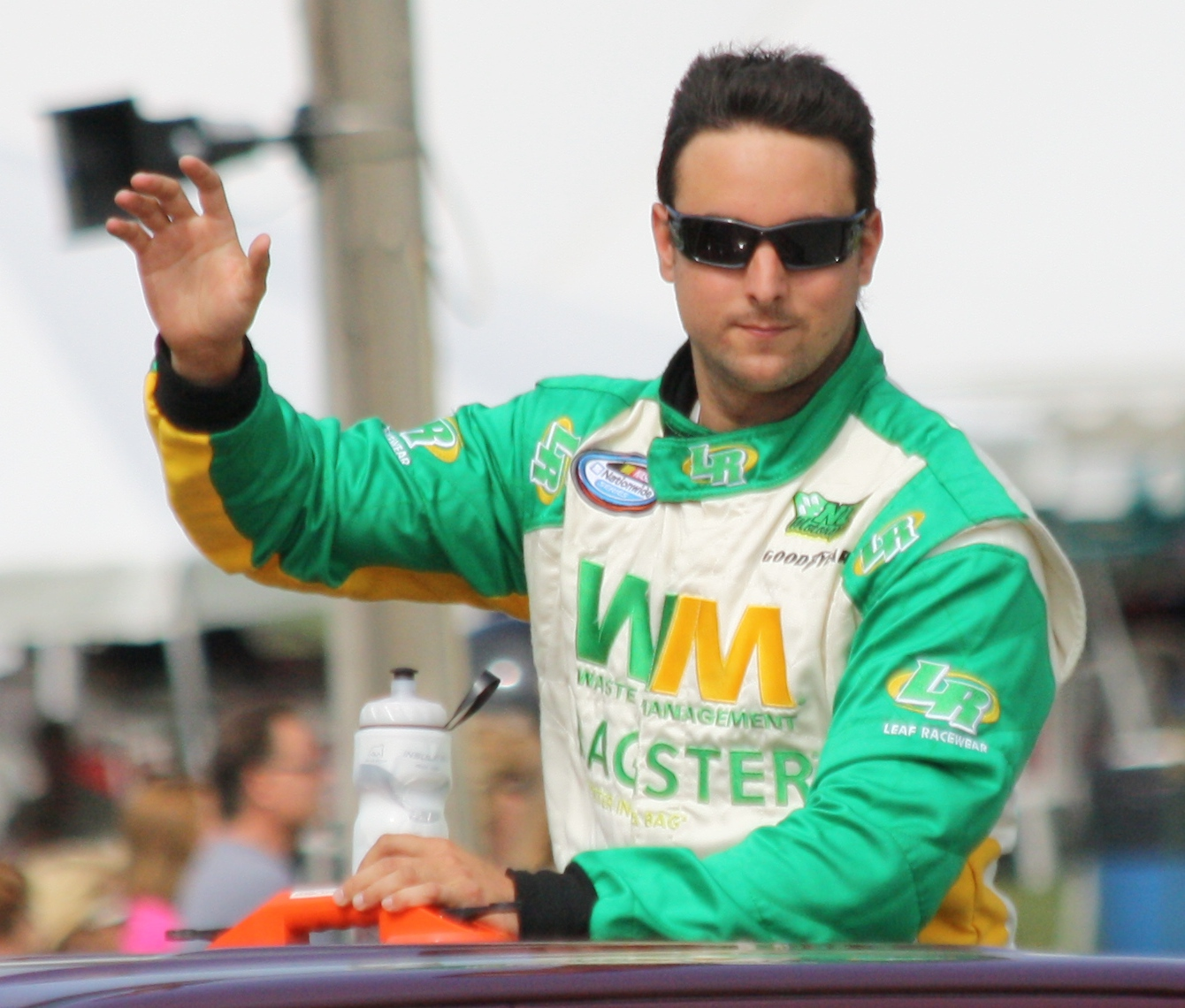
Andrew Ranger finished 2nd in the championship standings

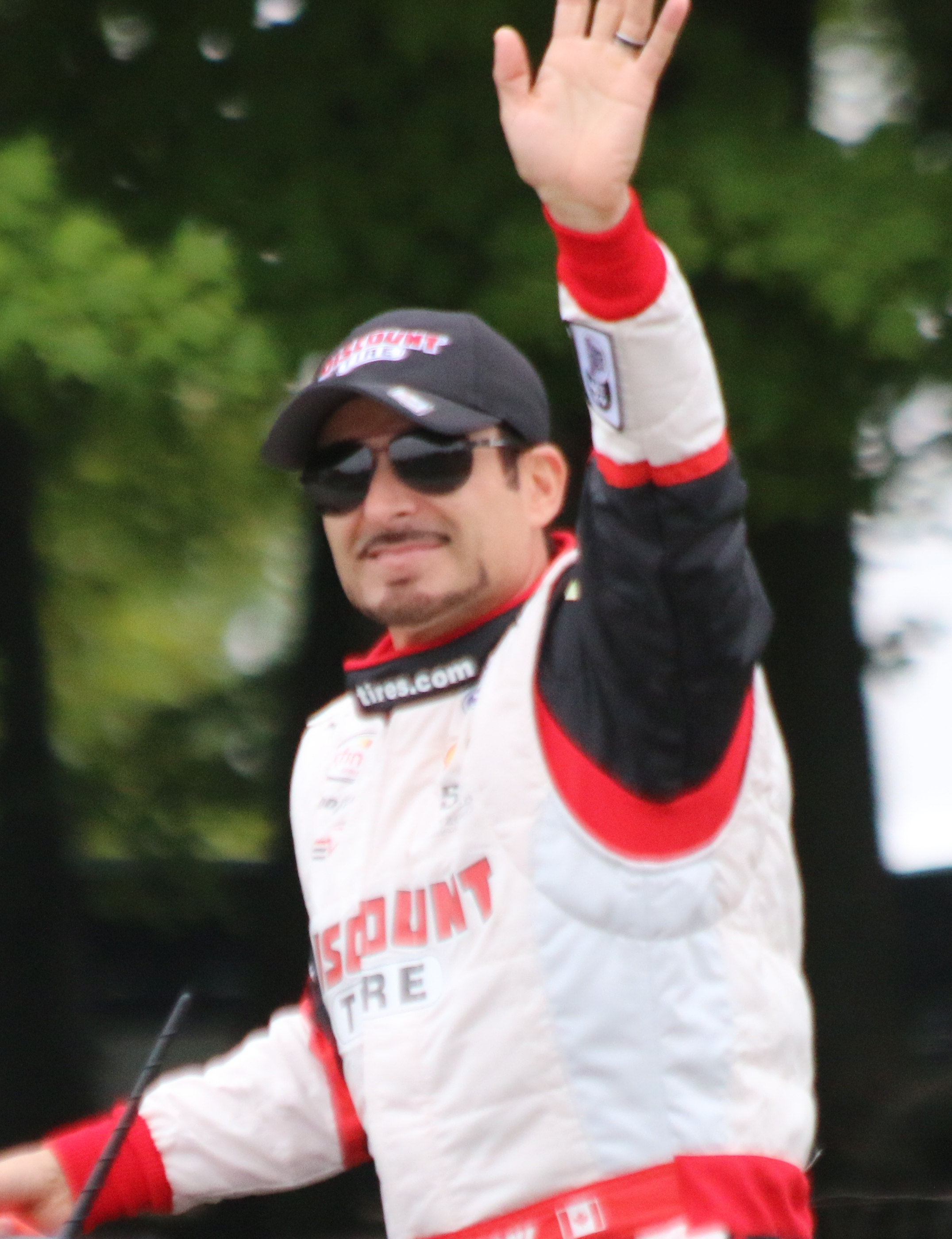
Alex Tagliani finished 3rd in the championship standings

The 2016 NASCAR Pinty's Series was the tenth season of the NASCAR Pinty's Series. Beginning on May 22 at Canadian Tire Motorsport Park, the season consisted of twelve races at eleven different venues in Canada. The season ended at Kawartha Speedway on September 18. Scott Steckly was the defending Drivers' Champion. Cayden Lapcevich won the 2016 championship when the Green Flag dropped at the last race, as there were not enough entries for Lapcevich to lose that many points that Andrew Ranger could have taken the championship. Lapcevich won the championship by a 54-point margin over Ranger.

The season was the first since naming rights of the series were transferred from Canadian Tire to frozen chicken supplier Pinty's.

== Drivers ==
No.	Manufacturer	Car Owner	Race Driver	Crew Chief
01	Chevrolet	Dennis LaForce	Shania LaForce (R) 1	Dennis LaForce
1	Dodge 3	Bud Morris	Robin Buck 3	Alan Haringa 3
1	Ford 8	Bud Morris	Larry Jackson 4	Ed Wrong 6 Frank Millman 1 Dave Stephens 1
1	Ford 8	Bud Morris	Kevin Poitras (R) 1	Ed Wrong 6 Frank Millman 1 Dave Stephens 1
1	Ford 8	Bud Morris	Joey McColm 3	Ed Wrong 6 Frank Millman 1 Dave Stephens 1
02	Ford	Susan Micks	Kerry Micks 5	Rino Montanari
02	Ford	Susan Micks	Mark Dilley 7	Rino Montanari
03	Dodge	Marc Arseneau	Elie Arseneau 1	Brandon White
3	Chevrolet	Ed Hakonson	Jason Hathaway	Craig Masters
04	Dodge	Eric Kerub	Jean-François Dumoulin 6	Robin McCluskey
06	Dodge	Carlos de Quesada	Carlos de Quesada (R) 2	Randy Smith
06	Dodge	Carlos de Quesada	Daniel Morad 2	Randy Smith
8	Ford 2	Bud Morris	Kevin Poitras (R) 2	Ed Wrong 2
8	Dodge 2	Bud Morris	Larry Jackson 1	David Stephens 1
8	Dodge 2	Bud Morris	Paul Geniole Jr. (R) 1	Paul Geniole Sr. 1
09	Dodge	Trevor Seibert	Jamie Krzysik (R) 2	Jeff Walt
9	Ford 8	Susan Micks	Adam Martin 6	Don Jacobson 5 Terry Wilson 3 Kevin Hein 2
9	Ford 8	Susan Micks	Kerry Micks 2	Don Jacobson 5 Terry Wilson 3 Kevin Hein 2
9	Dodge 1	Susan Micks	Jason Hankewich 2	Don Jacobson 5 Terry Wilson 3 Kevin Hein 2
9	Chevrolet 1	Susan Micks	Jason Hankewich 2	Don Jacobson 5 Terry Wilson 3 Kevin Hein 2
11	Dodge	Martin Cote	Martin Cote (R) 2	Dave Coursol
17	Dodge	Doug Kennington 1	D. J. Kennington	Ted McAlister
17	Dodge	D. J. Kennington 11	D. J. Kennington	Ted McAlister
18	Chevrolet	Colin Livingston	Pier-Luc Ouellette (R) 1	Tyler Case
18	Chevrolet	Colin Livingston	Alex Tagliani 11	Tyler Case
20	Dodge	Anthony Parisien	Raymond Guay (R) 2	Herby Drescher
21	Dodge	Rob McConnell	Jason White 2	Rob McConnell
22	Dodge	Scott Steckly	Kaz Grala 2	Randy Steckly
22	Dodge	Scott Steckly	Donald Theetge 2	Randy Steckly
22	Dodge	Scott Steckly	John Farano 1	Randy Steckly
25	Ford	Bud Morris	Joey McColm 1	Ryan Weiss 1 Joey McColm 5 Paul Geniole 1 Ed Wrong 2 Frank Millman 1
25	Ford	Bud Morris	Josh Collins (R) 4	Ryan Weiss 1 Joey McColm 5 Paul Geniole 1 Ed Wrong 2 Frank Millman 1
25	Ford	Bud Morris	Larry Jackson 3	Ryan Weiss 1 Joey McColm 5 Paul Geniole 1 Ed Wrong 2 Frank Millman 1
25	Ford	Bud Morris	Kevin Poitras (R) 1	Ryan Weiss 1 Joey McColm 5 Paul Geniole 1 Ed Wrong 2 Frank Millman 1
25	Ford	Bud Morris	Simon Dion-Viens 1	Ryan Weiss 1 Joey McColm 5 Paul Geniole 1 Ed Wrong 2 Frank Millman 1
27	Dodge	Doug Kennington	Andrew Ranger	Lawrence Roy 1
27	Dodge	Doug Kennington	Andrew Ranger	Dave Wight 11
32	Ford	Alain Lord Mounir	Alex Labbé	Mario Gosselin 1
32	Ford	Alain Lord Mounir	Alex Labbé	Ron Easton 9
32	Ford	Alain Lord Mounir	Alex Labbé	Randy Smith 1
32	Ford	Alain Lord Mounir	Alex Labbé	Dave Jacombs 1
36	Ford	Dave Jacombs	Jeffrey Earnhardt 1	Randy Smith
37	Dodge	Clement Samson	Simon Dion-Viens 2	Clement Samson
40	Dodge	Mario Michaud 1	David Michaud (R) 2	Frederick Cyr 1
40	Dodge	David Michaud 1	David Michaud (R) 2	Jonathan Lavoie 1
42	Chevrolet	Peter Klutt	Ryan Klutt 1	Jason Humphries
42	Chevrolet	Peter Klutt	Peter Klutt 3	Jason Humphries
46	Dodge	Scott Steckly	Brett Taylor (R) 3	Mike Knott 3
46	Dodge	Scott Steckly	Waylon Farrell (R) 1	Randy Steckly 1
47	Dodge	Marc-André Bergeron	Louis-Philippe Dumoulin	Bill Burns
48	Dodge	Gordon Coates	Dwayne Baker (R) 3	Kyle Baker
51	Dodge	Murray Haukaas	Nick Jewell 1	Dave Hall
53	Dodge	Kevin Dowler	Noel Dowler 2	Kevin Dowler
56	Dodge 10	Dan Bray 1 Jim Bray 11	Matthew Scannell 3	Howie Scannell Jr. 5 Deven Brown 3 Jonathan Lavoie 1 Gene Depot 1
56	Dodge 10	Dan Bray 1 Jim Bray 11	David Michaud (R) 2	Howie Scannell Jr. 5 Deven Brown 3 Jonathan Lavoie 1 Gene Depot 1
56	Dodge 10	Dan Bray 1 Jim Bray 11	Robin Buck 1	Howie Scannell Jr. 5 Deven Brown 3 Jonathan Lavoie 1 Gene Depot 1
56	Dodge 10	Dan Bray 1 Jim Bray 11	Kelly Admiraal 3	Howie Scannell Jr. 5 Deven Brown 3 Jonathan Lavoie 1 Gene Depot 1
56	Dodge 10	Dan Bray 1 Jim Bray 11	Derek Lynch 1	Howie Scannell Jr. 5 Deven Brown 3 Jonathan Lavoie 1 Gene Depot 1
56	Chevrolet 1	Dan Bray 1 Jim Bray 11	Bryan Cathcart (R) 1	Derek Lynch 1
59	Dodge	Peter Klutt	Gary Klutt	John Fletcher
67	Chevrolet	David Thorndyke	David Thorndyke 3	Kattie Smilovsky
69	Dodge	Trevor Seibert	Trevor Seibert 3	Al Lebert
69	Dodge	Trevor Seibert	Ryley Seibert 1	Al Lebert
71	Dodge	Patrice Brisebois	Patrick Dussault (R) 5	Jonathan Cote
74	Dodge	Sylvain Lacroix	Kevin Lacroix	Don Thomson Jr.
75	Chevrolet 2	Denise McCullough	Bryan Cathcart (R) 2	Derek Lynch 2
75	Dodge 1	Denise McCullough	Derek Lynch 1	Gene Depot 1
76	Dodge	Sherri Lapcevich	Cayden Lapcevich (R)	Jeff Lapcevich
77	Dodge	Katherine Almeida	Jocelyn Fecteau 3	Eric-Pierre Martel
83	Chevrolet	Menno Admiraal	Ian Admiraal 3	Craig Raudman 2
83	Chevrolet	Menno Admiraal	Ian Admiraal 3	Daniel Vaandrager 1
84	Dodge	Brian Barton	Larry Jackson 1	Dave Stephens
87	Chevrolet 1	Bud Morris	Mel Shaw (R) 1	Al Lebert 1
87	Dodge 1	Bud Morris	Larry Jackson 1	Dave Stephens 1
89	Ford	Donald Chisholm	Donald Chisholm 1	George Koszkulics
95	Dodge	Peter Simone	Anthony Simone 9	Jeff Walt
99	Chevrolet	Brandon White	Marc-Antoine Camirand 1	Brandon White

== Schedule ==
The 2016 Pinty's Series schedule was released on December 16, 2015 and featured twelve events, one more than the 2015 season. The additional race was held on July 16 at Exhibition Place in Toronto, which returned to the schedule after a five-year absence.

No.	Race title	Tracks	Date
1	Clarington 200	Canadian Tire Motorsport Park, Bowmanville	May 22
2	Leland Industries 300 presented by Dickies	Sunset Speedway, Innisfil	June 18
3	CRS Express 300	Autodrome Chaudière, Vallée-Jonction	June 24 (Note: The CRS Express 300 was postponed thirteen days due to the forecast for rain throughout the weekend.)
4	Ecko Unlimited 100	Circuit ICAR, Mirabel	July 3
5	Pinty's Grand Prix of Toronto	Exhibition Place, Toronto	July 16
6	Alberta Has New Energy 300	Edmonton International Raceway, Wetaskiwin	July 23
7	Prairie Velocity Thunder 250	Wyant Group Raceway, Saskatoon	July 27
8	Can-Am 50 Tours	Circuit Trois-Rivières, Trois-Rivières	August 14
9	Bumper to Bumper 300	Riverside International Speedway, Antigonish	August 20
10	Can-Am 200	Canadian Tire Motorsport Park, Bowmanville	September 4
11	Lucas Oil 250	Autodrome Saint-Eustache, Saint-Eustache	September 10
12	Kawartha 250	Kawartha Speedway, Fraserville	September 18 (Note: The Kawartha 250 was postponed a day due to continued rain throughout the afternoon and heavy rain forecasted for later Saturday night.)

== Results and standings ==
=== Races ===
No.	Race	Pole position	Most laps led	Winning driver	Manufacturer
1	Clarington 200	Alex Labbé	Jason Hathaway	Andrew Ranger	Dodge
2	Leland Industries 300 presented by Dickies	Cayden Lapcevich	Alex Tagliani	Alex Tagliani	Chevrolet
3	CRS Express 300	Alex Labbé	Alex Labbé	Alex Labbé	Ford
4	Ecko Unlimited 100	Alex Labbé	Andrew Ranger	Andrew Ranger	Dodge
5	Pinty's Grand Prix of Toronto	Andrew Ranger	Alex Tagliani	Alex Tagliani	Chevrolet
6	Alberta Has New Energy 300	Kevin Lacroix	Alex Tagliani	Alex Tagliani	Chevrolet
7	Prairie Velocity Thunder 250	Andrew Ranger	Cayden Lapcevich	Cayden Lapcevich	Dodge
8	Can-Am 50 Tours	Kevin Lacroix	Kevin Lacroix	Kevin Lacroix	Dodge
9	Bumper to Bumper 300	Donald Chisholm	Alex Tagliani	Cayden Lapcevich	Dodge
10	Can-Am 200	Alex Tagliani	Kevin Lacroix	Kevin Lacroix	Dodge
11	Lucas Oil 250	Alex Labbé	D. J. Kennington	Cayden Lapcevich	Dodge
12	Kawartha 250	Donald Theetge	Jason Hathaway	Jason Hathaway	Chevrolet

=== Drivers' championship ===
(key) Bold – Pole position awarded by time. Italics – Pole position set by final practice results or Owner's points. * – Most laps led.

Pos.	Driver	MSP	SUN	ACD	ICAR	TOR	EIR	WYA	CTR	RIV	MSP	STE	KAW	Points
1	Cayden Lapcevich **(R)**	4	**2**	2	8	8	3	1*	6	1	3	1	2	505
2	Andrew Ranger	1	8	8	1*	**2**	6	**5**	2	14	21	8	14	451
3	Alex Tagliani		1*	3	6	1*	1*	4	3	9*	**17**	5	8	446
4	Kevin Lacroix	23	5	6	3	3	**15**	8	**1***	10	1*	11	12	443
5	Louis-Philippe Dumoulin	12	12	11	13	4	2	2	8	2	2	14	5	443
6	D. J. Kennington	3	6	10	4	25	10	6	9	8	8	2*	4	438
7	Alex Labbé	**5**	15	**1***	**2**	12	7	3	4	12	23	9	3	423
8	Gary Klutt	10	13	13	7	6	9	7	22	13	6	7	9	407
9	Jason Hathaway	9*	17	7	21	11	17	17	18	3	5	10	1*	401
10	Larry Jackson	13	3	12	17	24	11		11		12	6	11	320
11	Mark Dilley		14	5			5	10		7		3	6	261
12	Kerry Micks	7		16	14	5			20		9		7	230
13	Adam Martin		4		15	17				6	18	4		200
14	Anthony Simone	19	19	15	19	26			21		19	15	Wth	199
15	Jean-François Dumoulin	6			9	10			10		20	12		197
16	Patrick Dussault **(R)**	16			10	20			16		11			147
17	Simon Dion-Viens	8			12				17			13		127
18	Josh Collins **(R)**		7	14	18	16								122
19	David Michaud **(R)**	18		9	11				19					119
20	Joey McColm	14					13	19					16	114
21	Robin Buck	2			Wth	22					4			104
22	Kelly Admiraal						8	11		11				102
23	Kevin Poitras **(R)**	21			20	21		14						100
24	Dwayne Baker **(R)**		16							5			15	96
25	Peter Klutt				23	9					7			93
26	Brett Taylor **(R)**	17				19					10			86
27	Matthew Scannell	25	9			13								85
28	Jocelyn Fecteau				22				13		13			84
29	Bryan Cathcart **(R)**	15				14					22			81
30	Daniel Morad					7			5					77
31	David Thorndyke	26				18					14			74
32	Donald Theetge			4									**13**	72
33	Jamie Krzysik **(R)**						4	13						71
34	Derek Lynch		11										10	67
35	Jason Hankewich						12	12						64
36	Noel Dowler						16	9						63
37	Ian Admiraal						18	15		16				63
38	Raymond Guay **(R)**				16				12					60
39	Martin Cote **(R)**								14		16			58
40	Jason White		18			15								55
41	Kaz Grala	20									15			53
42	Carlos de Quesada **(R)**	22									24			42
43	Donald Chisholm									**4**				41
44	Elie Arseneau				5									39
45	Jeffrey Earnhardt								7					37
46	Trevor Seibert		10	Wth				Wth						34
47	Pier-Luc Ouellette **(R)**	11												33
48	Ryley Seibert						14							30
49	Marc-Antoine Camirand								15					29
50	Waylon Farrell **(R)**									15				29
51	Shania LaForce **(R)**							16						28
52	Paul Geniole Jr. **(R)**												17	27
53	Nick Jewell							18						26
54	John Farano					23								21
55	Mel Shaw **(R)**	24												20
56	Ryan Klutt	27												17
Pos.	Driver	MSP	SUN	ACD	ICAR	TOR	EIR	WYA	CTR	RIV	MSP	STE	KAW	Points

== See also ==
- 2016 NASCAR Sprint Cup Series
- 2016 NASCAR Xfinity Series
- 2016 NASCAR Camping World Truck Series
- 2016 NASCAR K&N Pro Series East
- 2016 NASCAR K&N Pro Series West
- 2016 NASCAR Whelen Modified Tour
- 2016 NASCAR Whelen Southern Modified Tour
- 2016 NASCAR Whelen Euro Series
