= GC Motorsports International =

NASCAR team

GC Motorsports International (GCMI)
- Owner: Steve Meehan
- Base: Hamilton, Ontario, Canada; Nashville, Tennessee, United States
- Series: Nationwide Series; Canadian Tire Series
- Manufacturer: Ford; Dodge

Career
- Debut: 2011 Royal Purple 300
- Races competed: 18
- Drivers' Championships: 0
- Race victories: 0
- Pole positions: 0

GC Motorsports International (formerly Go Canada Racing) was a NASCAR racing team based in Ontario, Canada, owned by Canadian businessman Steve Meehan.

Meehan founded GCMI in the spring of 2011, the result of his desire to bring together his interest in racing with his talent for business. The team was formed when Meehan bought the No. 27 NASCAR Nationwide Series team that had previously competed under both the names Brewco Motorsports and Baker Curb Racing.

In 2012, GC Motorsports International partnered with Dave Jacombs Racing to launch a two-car effort in the NASCAR Canadian Tire Series and form a subsidiary team GC Motorsports Canada.

== NASCAR Nationwide Series ==
=== 2011 ===
When the team was formed, GCMI initially hired Canadian J. R. Fitzpatrick to drive the car, but he left the team after a few races. After the departure, J. J. Yeley was brought to drive the No. 27 car for several races to start and park the car. The car returned to the number 67 when Canadian Andrew Ranger drove for the team at Loudon and Homestead.

=== 2012 ===
2012 began with David Ragan, the winner of the 2011 Coke Zero 400 in the NASCAR Sprint Cup Series, behind the wheel of car No. 27 at Daytona. Ragan qualified 23rd and finished 26th. He also took part in the O'Reilly Auto Parts 300 at Texas, qualifying 30th and finishing 6th. Andrew Ranger competed in a number of Nationwide races including the series' only Canadian race, the Napa Auto Parts 200 at Montreal. He qualified 12th and finished 32nd. He also competed at Homestead and finished 28th.

=== Car No. 27/67 results ===
Year	Driver	No.	Make	1	2	3	4	5	6	7	8	9	10	11	12	13	14	15	16	17	18	19	20	21	22	23	24	25	26	27	28	29	30	31	32	33	34	Owners	Pts
2011	J. R. Fitzpatrick	67	Ford	DAY	PHO	LVS	BRI	CAL	TEX	TAL	NSH; 27	RCH	DAR	DOV; 21	IOW	CLT	CHI	MCH	ROA; 10	DAY	KEN					GLN; 38	CGV; 5	BRI	ATL	RCH								42nd	143
2011	Andrew Ranger	67	Ford																			NHA; 28	NSH	IRP	IOW												HOM; 36	42nd	143
2011	J. J. Yeley	27	Ford																												CHI; 42	DOV	KAN; 43	CLT	TEX; 38	PHO		42nd	143
2012	David Ragan	27	Ford	DAY; 27					TEX; 6	RCH	TAL	DAR	IOW	CLT	DOV	MCH	ROA	KEN	DAY	NHA	CHI	IND	IOW	GLN														43rd	125
2012	J. J. Yeley	27	Ford		PHO; 37	LVS; 38	BRI; 39	CAL																							DOV; 23	CLT	KAN	TEX	PHO			43rd	125
2012	Andrew Ranger	27	Dodge																						CGV; 32	BRI	ATL	RCH	CHI	KEN								43rd	125
2012	Andrew Ranger	27	Ford																																	HOM; 28		43rd	125

== NASCAR Canadian Tire Series ==
=== 2012 ===
The team launched an effort in the NASCAR Canadian Tire Series with two cars anchored by two time series champion Andrew Ranger.
