= Andrew Ranger =

Canadian racing driver (born 1986)

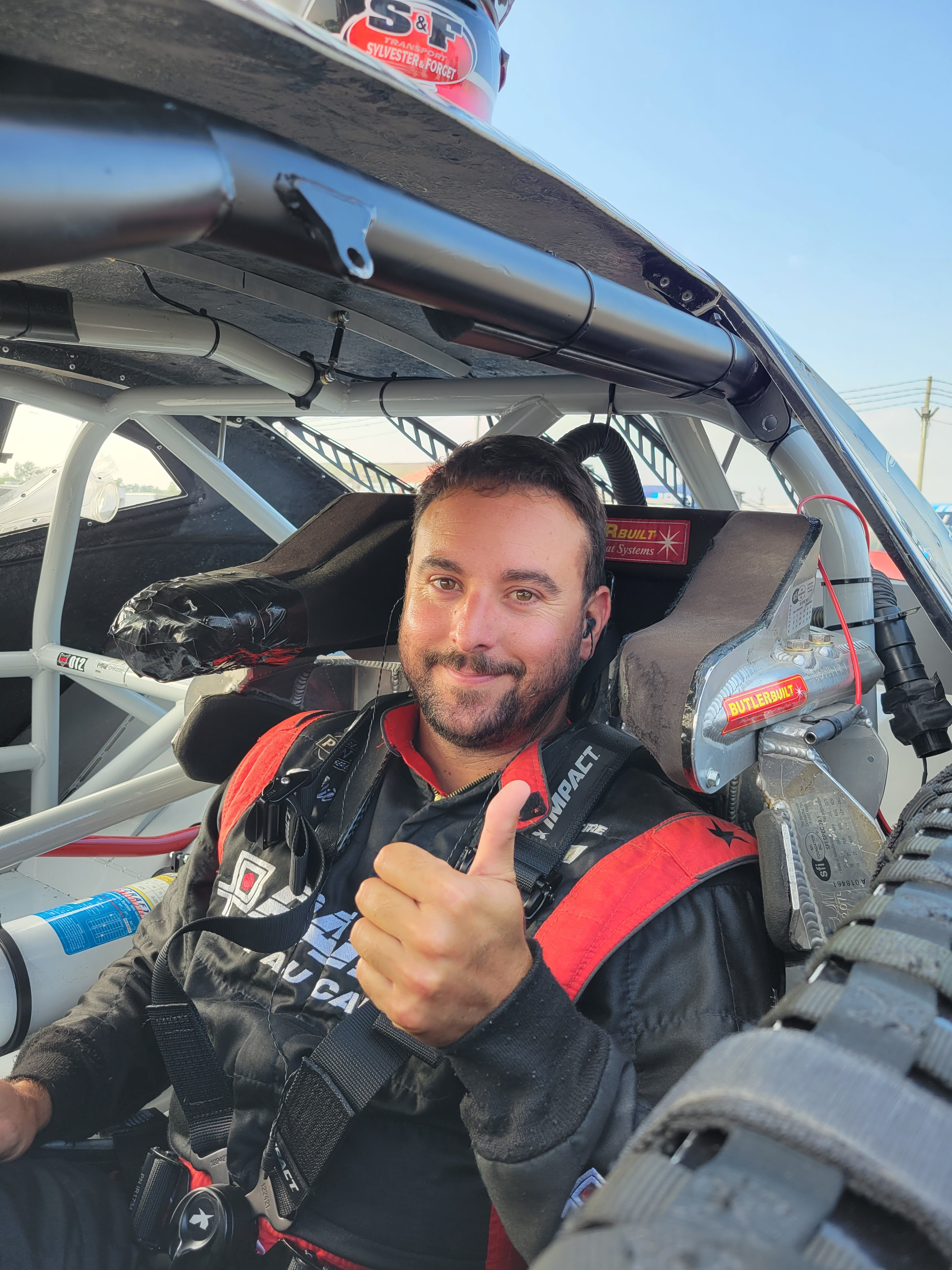
- Ranger in 2023
- Born: November 20, 1986 (age 39); Roxton Pond, Quebec, Canada
- Achievements: 2007, 2009, 2019 NASCAR Pinty's Series Champion; 2003 North American Fran Am 2000 Pro Champion
- Awards: 2009, 2010 NASCAR Canadian Tire Series Most Popular Driver; 2004 Toyota Atlantic Rookie of the Year

NASCAR Cup Series career
- 1 race run over 1 year
- Best finish: 71st (2011)
- First race: 2011 Heluva Good! Sour Cream Dips at The Glen (Watkins Glen)
Wins	Top tens	Poles
0	0	0

NASCAR O'Reilly Auto Parts Series career
- 17 races run over 6 years
- 2013 position: 75th
- Best finish: 49th (2011)
- First race: 2008 NAPA Auto Parts 200 (Montreal)
- Last race: 2013 Nationwide Children's Hospital 200 (Mid-Ohio)
Wins	Top tens	Poles
0	2	0

NASCAR FedEx Freight Truck Series career
- 1 race run over 1 year
- 2014 position: 57th
- Best finish: 57th (2014)
- First race: 2014 Chevrolet Silverado 250 (Mosport)
Wins	Top tens	Poles
0	1	0

NASCAR Canada Series career
- 207 races run over 19 years
- Car no., team: No. 27 (Innovation Auto Sport)
- 2026 position: 5th
- Best finish: 1st (2007, 2009, 2019)
- First race: 2007 Dodge Dealers 200 (Cayuga)
- Last race: 2026 NTN BCA 200 (Delaware)
- First win: 2007 Dickies 200 (Mosport)
- Last win: 2026 WeatherTech 200 (Mosport)
Wins	Top tens	Poles
36	164	30

ARCA Menards Series career
- 9 races run over 5 years
- Best finish: 33rd (2011)
- First race: 2011 Modspace 150 (New Jersey)
- Last race: 2026 Lime Rock Park ARCA 100 (Lime Rock)
- First win: 2011 Modspace 150 (New Jersey)
- Last win: 2014 Great Railing 150 (New Jersey)
Wins	Top tens	Poles
4	9	3

ARCA Menards Series East career
- 14 races run over 4 years
- Best finish: 18th (2010)
- First race: 2010 ARCA Iowa 150 (Iowa)
- Last race: 2014 Bully Hill Vineyards 125 (Watkins Glen)
- First win: 2010 K&N 100 (Lime Rock)
Wins	Top tens	Poles
1	6	1

ARCA Menards Series West career
- 4 races run over 2 years
- Best finish: 32nd (2013)
- First race: 2010 Thunder Valley Casino Resort 200 (Sonoma)
- Last race: 2013 iON Camera Utah Grand Prix (Utah)
- First win: 2010 Thunder Valley Casino Resort 200 (Sonoma)
- Last win: 2013 iON Camera Utah Grand Prix (Utah)
Wins	Top tens	Poles
2	4	2
- Statistics up to date as of September 13, 2026.

Andrew Ranger (born November 20, 1986) is a Canadian professional racing driver who competes part-time in the NASCAR Canada Series, driving the No. 27 Chevrolet for Innovation Auto Sport.

Ranger is a veteran of the Canada Series, having claimed 36 wins in 207 races. He was champion in 2007, 2009 and 2019, runner-up in 2016 and 2021, and third in 2012, 2015, 2024, and 2025.

== Racing career ==
=== Champ Car ===
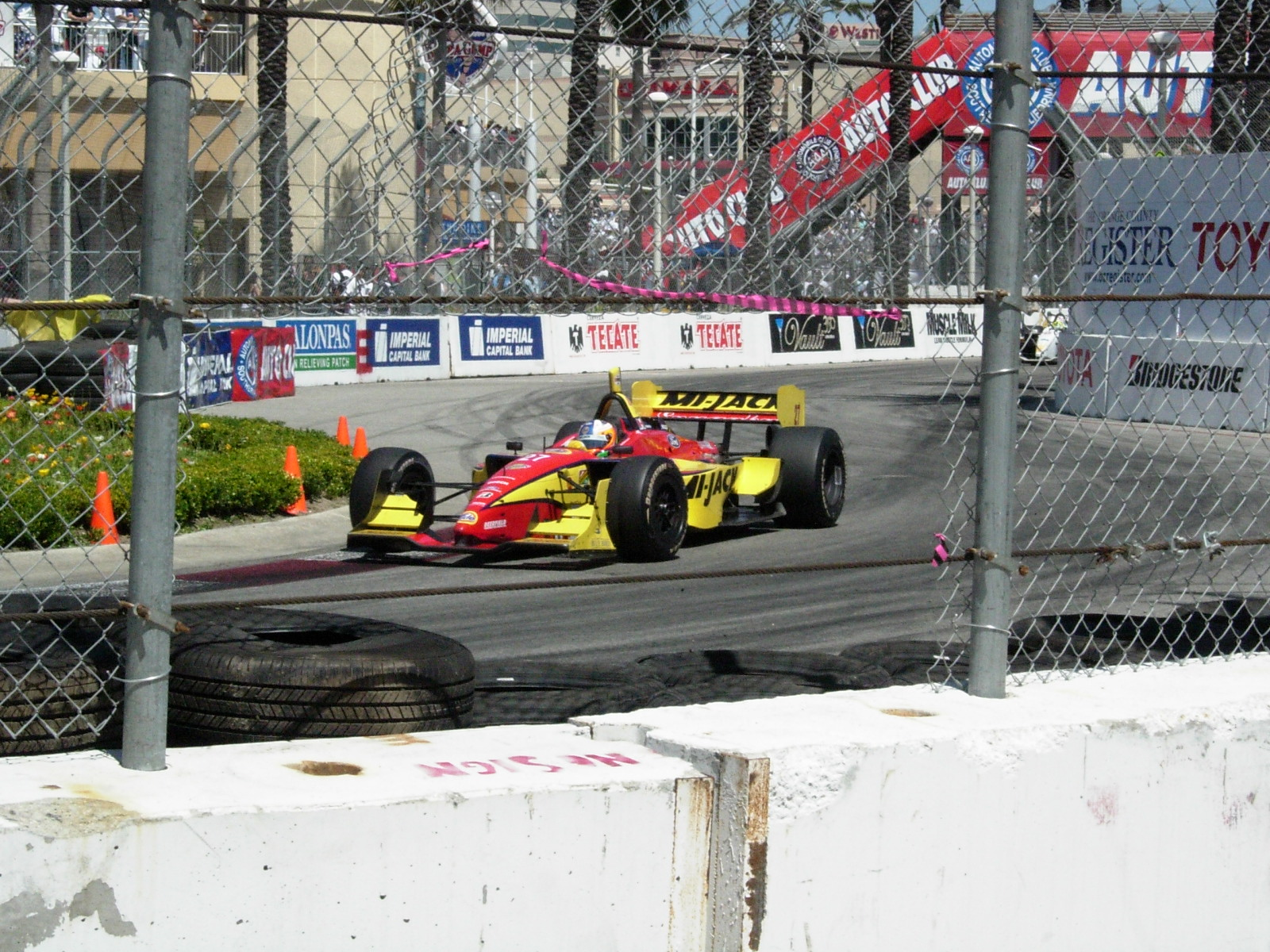
Ranger in the Champ Car race at Long Beach in 2005

Ranger was the 2002 Canadian Formula A Karting champion and 2003 North American Fran Am 2000 Pro Champion. He raced in the Toyota Atlantic series in 2004 with number 27, the same as Quebec racecar drivers Gilles Villeneuve and Jacques Villeneuve, scoring six podiums (top-three finishes) and winning the Rookie of the Year award.

Ranger made his debut in the Champ Car World Series in 2005 with Conquest Racing, also driving the No. 27 car. He became the youngest driver in the series' history to finish on the podium with a second place at Monterrey. After a few solid finishes at the beginning of the season, Ranger's year went downhill as he mostly struggled in the second half of the season, but held on to tenth in the points championship. In 2006, he remained with the Conquest Racing team. He ranked tenth in the standings with a best finish of fifth at the 2006 Lexmark Indy 300.

=== NASCAR ===
With no sponsorship and Champ Car merging with the Indy Racing League, Ranger moved to stock car racing in the NASCAR Canadian Tire Series to drive the No. 27 Ford for Dave Jacombs. He won the second race in the series at Mosport International Raceway, and the season points championship. He has also won at Montreal and Trois-Rivières during 2008.

In 2009, Ranger was the class of the field for the NASCAR Canadian Tire Series, winning the Dickies 200 at Mosport International Raceway, the A&W 300 at SunValley Speedway (his first ever oval win), The Rexall Edmonton Indy, Vortex Brake Pads 200 at Mosport International Raceway, the GP3R 300 at Circuit Trois-Rivières and the Komatsu 300 At Riverside Speedway. On top of all of this he scored two poles and many podium finishes. Ranger ended up winning the title by 167 points for his second championship in three years.

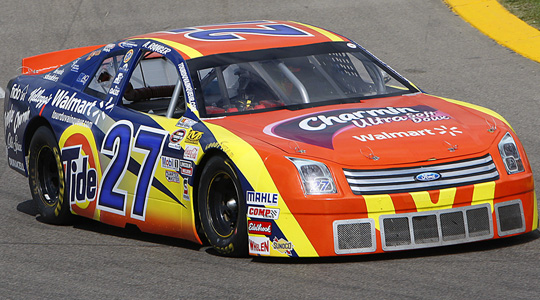
Ranger's 2009 championship-winning Canadian Tire Series car

Ranger drove for Fitz Motorsports in the August 2008 NASCAR Nationwide Series race at Circuit Gilles Villeneuve in Montreal and he also drove for the team in four of the remaining ten races of 2008 with a best finish of 19th at Bristol Motor Speedway. In 2009, he drove the No. 11 Tide/Ridemakerz.com Toyota Camry to a third place finish after leading many laps in the 2009 Napa Auto Parts 200 at Circuit Gilles Villeneuve. For 2010 he drove for the No. 27 Baker-Curb Racing Nationwide team with sponsorship from Dodge, including at Montreal.

For 2010, Ranger drove part-time at the NASCAR Canadian Tire Series with the No. 27 Dave Jacombs Dodge. He ran some races for NDS Motorsports in their No. 35 Waste Management Chevy in the NASCAR K&N Pro Series East and West series. He won the race at Infineon Raceway in the K&N Pro Series West on June 20. He picked up the win from pole in Lime Rock Park in the K&N Pro Series East. On July 17, he won from the pole at the Toronto Indy 100, being the first driver to win all three NASCAR regional touring series in one year. His third win of the year was at Trois-Rivières and at Circuit Gilles Villeneuve, where he bumped Jason Bowles in the last turn for the win both times from the pole. In 2011, he again won at Montreal and Toronto on a limited basis schedule.

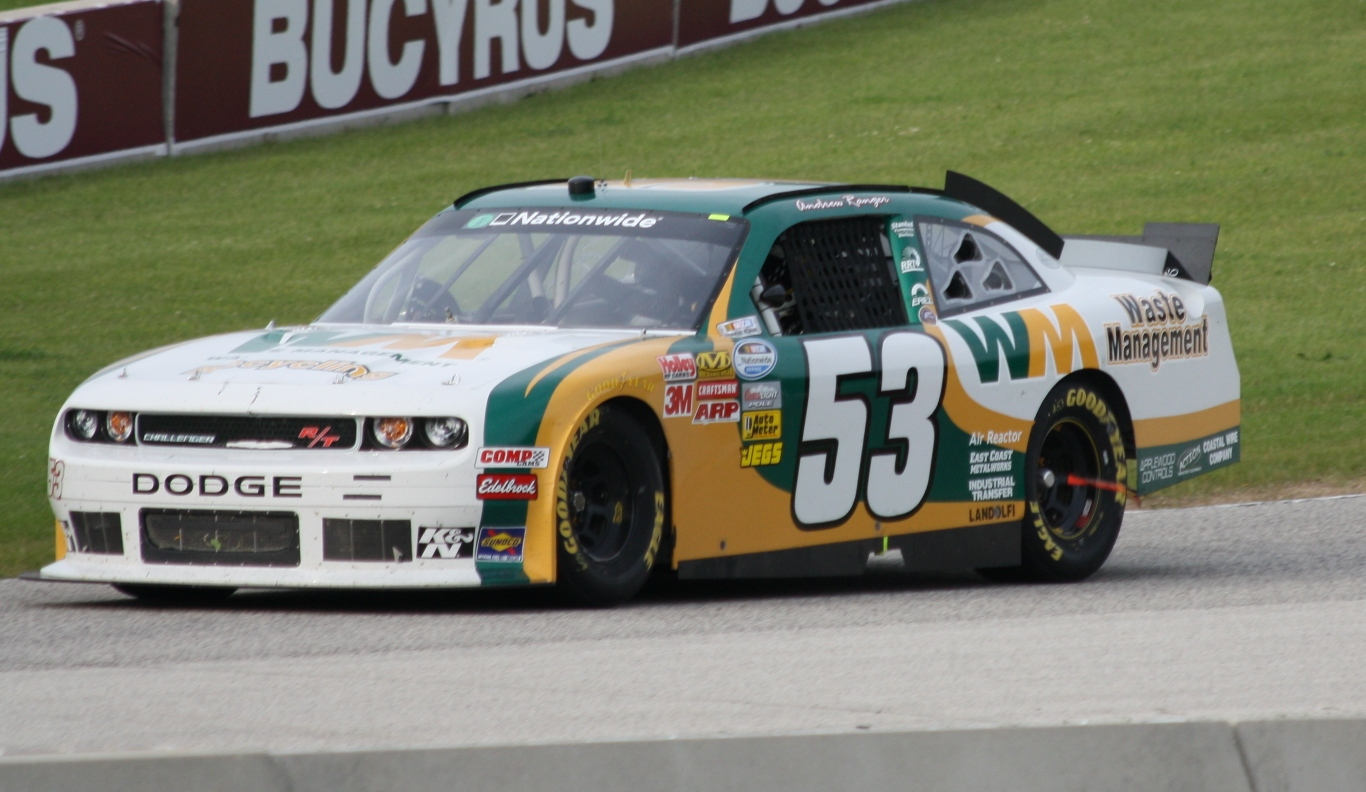
Ranger at Road America in 2011

Ranger raced in the K&N Pro Series and the NASCAR Canadian Tire Series again in 2011. On May 22, 2011, Ranger won the ARCA race on the road course at New Jersey Motorsports Park in Millville, New Jersey. On June 25, 2011, Andrew competed in the NASCAR Nationwide Series race at Road America, finishing sixth. Ranger made his NASCAR Sprint Cup Series debut at Watkins Glen, finishing 35th for FAS Lane Racing. As of 2026, he has not raced or attempted in Cup Series since.

For 2012, Ranger ran in the NASCAR Canadian Tire Series and Nationwide Series for GC Motorsports. He won two Canadian Tire events in his home province of Quebec at Circuit Gilles Villeneuve and Circuit ICAR along with the ARCA event at New Jersey Motorsports Park.

In 2013, Ranger ran a partial schedule in the Canadian Tire Series. He also ran the road courses in the NASCAR Nationwide Series and in the ARCA Racing Series. He won at New Jersey Motorsports Park in the ARCA Racing Series for the third year in a row.

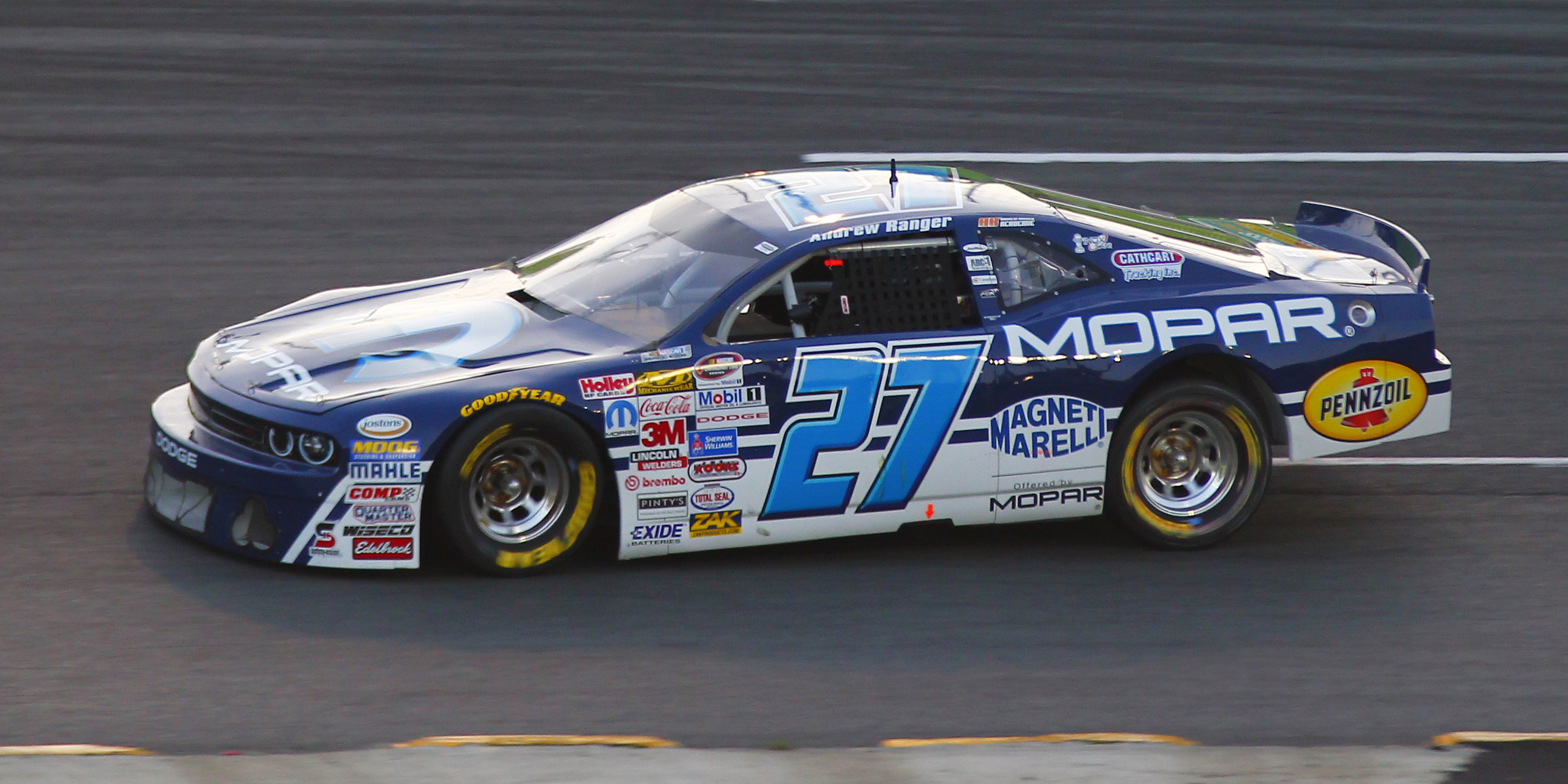
Ranger at Autodrome Chaudière in 2015

In 2014, Ranger left Dave Jacombs's team and joined D. J. Kennington's DJK Racing to drive the No. 27 Dodge. He would remain with the team through 2019. Ranger did not participate in the abbreviated 2020 Pinty's Series season held during the COVID-19 pandemic. He returned to the series in 2021 driving for Rick Ware Racing's new Pinty's Series team. The team also gave him one race in their Xfinity (previously Nationwide) Series No. 17 car, which they field jointly with SS-Green Light Racing. He wanted to compete, but was replaced by J. J. Yeley.

== Motorsports career results ==
=== American open-wheel racing results ===
(key)

==== Atlantic Championship ====
Toyota Atlantic results
Year	Team	1	2	3	4	5	6	7	8	9	10	11	12	Rank	Points
2004	Sierra Sierra Racing	LBH; 2	MTY; Ret	MIL; 3	POR1; 3	POR2; 4	CLE; 12	TOR; 2	VAN; 7	ROA; 3	DEN; 4	MTL; 5	LS; 3	**4th**	**257**

==== Champ Car ====
Champ Car results
Year	Team	No.	1	2	3	4	5	6	7	8	9	10	11	12	13	14	Rank	Points	Ref
2005	Conquest Racing	27	LBH; 17	MTY; 2	MIL; 16	POR; 7	CLE; 8	TOR; 11	EDM; 18	SJO; 16	DEN; 10	MTL; 11	LVG; 14	SRF; 10	MXC; 9		**10th**	**140**	
2006	Conquest Racing	27	LBH; 6	HOU; 6	MTY; 7	MIL; 7	POR; 9	CLE; 11	TOR; 10	EDM; 7	SJO; 13	DEN; 14	MTL; 15	ROA; 8	SRF; 5	MXC; 8	**10th**	**200**	

=== NASCAR ===
(key) (Bold - Pole position awarded by time. Italics - Pole position earned by points standings. * – Most laps led.)

==== Sprint Cup Series ====
NASCAR Sprint Cup Series results
Year	Team	No.	Make	1	2	3	4	5	6	7	8	9	10	11	12	13	14	15	16	17	18	19	20	21	22	23	24	25	26	27	28	29	30	31	32	33	34	35	36	NSCC	Pts	Ref
2011	FAS Lane Racing	32	Ford	DAY	PHO	LSV	BRI	CAL	MAR	TEX	TAL	RCH	DAR	DOV	CLT	KAN	POC	MCH	INF	DAY	KEN	NHA	IND	POC	GLN; 35	MCH	BRI	ATL	RCH	CHI	NHA	DOV	KAN	CLT	TAL	MAR	TEX	PHO	HOM	71st	0^{1}	

==== Nationwide Series ====
NASCAR Nationwide Series results
Year	Team	No.	Make	1	2	3	4	5	6	7	8	9	10	11	12	13	14	15	16	17	18	19	20	21	22	23	24	25	26	27	28	29	30	31	32	33	34	35	NNSC	Pts	Ref
2008	FitzBradshaw Racing	22	Dodge	DAY	CAL	LVS	ATL	BRI	NSH	TEX	PHO	MXC	TAL	RCH	DAR	CLT	DOV	NSH	KEN	MLW	NHA	DAY	CHI	GTY	IRP	CGV; 28	GLN	MCH	BRI; 19	CAL	RCH; 33	DOV	KAN; 31	CLT; 20	MEM	TEX	PHO	HOM	66th	427	
2009	CJM Racing	11	Toyota	DAY	CAL	LVS	BRI	TEX	NSH	PHO	TAL	RCH	DAR	CLT	DOV	NSH	KEN	MLW	NHA	DAY	CHI	GTY	IRP	IOW	GLN	MCH	BRI	CGV; 3	ATL	RCH	DOV	KAN	CAL	CLT	MEM	TEX	PHO	HOM	105th	170	
2010	Baker-Curb Racing	27	Dodge	DAY	CAL	LVS	BRI	NSH	PHO	TEX	TAL	RCH	DAR	DOV	CLT	NSH	KEN	ROA	NHA	DAY	CHI	GTY	IRP	IOW	GLN	MCH	BRI	CGV; 39	ATL	RCH	DOV	KAN	CAL	CLT	GTY	TEX	PHO	HOM	141st	46	
2011	NDS Motorsports	53	Dodge	DAY	PHO	LVS	BRI	CAL	TEX	TAL	NSH	RCH	DAR	DOV	IOW	CLT	CHI	MCH	ROA; 6	DAY	KEN					GLN; 37	CGV; 41	BRI	ATL	RCH	CHI	DOV	KAN	CLT	TEX	PHO			49th	72	
2011	Go Canada Racing	67	Ford																			NHA; 28	NSH	IRP	IOW												HOM; 36		49th	72	
2012	GC Motorsports International	27	Dodge	DAY	PHO	LVS	BRI	CAL	TEX	RCH	TAL	DAR	IOW	CLT	DOV	MCH	ROA	KEN	DAY	NHA	CHI	IND	IOW	GLN	CGV; 32	BRI	ATL	RCH	CHI	KEN	DOV	CLT	KAN	TEX	PHO				74th	28	
2012	GC Motorsports International	27	Ford																																	HOM; 28			74th	28	
2013	NDS Motorsports	53	Dodge	DAY	PHO	LVS	BRI	CAL	TEX	RCH	TAL	DAR	CLT	DOV	IOW	MCH	ROA; 29	KEN	DAY	NHA	CHI	IND	IOW	GLN; 26	MOH; 16	BRI	ATL	RCH	CHI	KEN	DOV	KAN	CLT	TEX	PHO	HOM			75th	18	

==== Camping World Truck Series ====
NASCAR Camping World Truck Series results
Year	Team	No.	Make	1	2	3	4	5	6	7	8	9	10	11	12	13	14	15	16	17	18	19	20	21	22	NCWTC	Pts	Ref
2014	NDS Motorsports	53	Ram	DAY	MAR	KAN	CLT	DOV	TEX	GTW	KEN	IOW	ELD	POC	MCH	BRI	MSP; 5	CHI	NHA	LVS	TAL	MAR	TEX	PHO	HOM	57th	40	

==== K&N Pro Series East ====
NASCAR K&N Pro Series East results
Year	Team	No.	Make	1	2	3	4	5	6	7	8	9	10	11	12	13	14	15	16	NKNPSEC	Pts	Ref
2010	NDS Motorsports	35	Chevy	GRE	SBO	IOW; 18	MAR; 5	NHA; 9	**LRP**; 1*	LEE; 23	JFC	NHA; 7	DOV; 15							18th	955	
2011	NDS Motorsports	35	Chevy	GRE	SBO	RCH; 22	IOW	BGS	JFC	LGY	NHA; 33	COL	GRE	NHA; 36						36th	328	
2011	NDS Motorsports	35	Ford												DOV; 17					36th	328	
2013	NDS Motorsports	53	Dodge	BRI	GRE	FIF	RCH	BGS	IOW	LGY	COL	IOW	VIR; 23	GRE	NHA	DOV				39th	61	
2013	NDS Motorsports	53	Ford														RAL; 4			39th	61	
2014	NDS Motorsports	53	Ford	NSM	DAY	BRI	GRE	RCH	IOW	BGS	FIF	LGY	NHA	COL	IOW	GLN; 2*	VIR	GRE	DOV	48th	44	

==== K&N Pro Series West ====
NASCAR K&N Pro Series West results
Year	Team	No.	Make	1	2	3	4	5	6	7	8	9	10	11	12	13	14	15	NKNPSWC	Pts	Ref
2010	NDS Motorsports	35	Chevy	AAS	PHO	IOW	DCS	SON; 1	IRW	POR	MON	COL	MMP	AAS	PHO; 20				37th	288	
2011	NDS Motorsports	35	Chevy	PHO; 7	AAS	**MMP**; 20	IOW	LVS	SON	IRW	EVG	PIR; 18	CNS	MRP	SPO	AAS	PHO		38th	368	
2013	NDS Motorsports	53	Dodge	PHO	S99	**BIR**; 10	IOW	L44	SON	CNS	IOW	EVG	SPO	MMP; 1	SMP	AAS	KCR	PHO	32nd	81	

==== Canada Series ====
NASCAR Canada Series results
Year	Team	No.	Make	1	2	3	4	5	6	7	8	9	10	11	12	13	14	NCSC	Pts	Ref
2007	Jacombs Racing	27	Ford	HAM; 4	**MSP**; **1**	BAR; 5	MPS; 9	EDM; 2*	CGV; 2	MSP; 13	CTR; 2	HAM; 2*	BAR; 6	RIS; 13	KWA; 6			1st	1896	
2008	Jacombs Racing	27	Ford	HAM; 16	MSP; 6	BAR; 6	ASE; 4	MPS; 11	**EDM**; **3**	CGV; 1	MSP; 7	CTR; 1	HAM; 2	BAR; 12	RIS; 6	KWA		4th	1853	
2009	Jacombs Racing	27	Ford	ASE; 6*	DEL; 8	**MSP**; **1***	ASE; 4	MPS; 1*	**EDM**; **1***	SAS; 8	MSP; 1	CTR; 1*	CGV; 2	BAR; 9	RIS; 1	KWA; 9		1st	2190	
2010	Jacombs Racing	27	Dodge	DEL	**MSP**; **2**	ASE; 9	**TOR**; **1***	EDM	MPS	SAS	**CTR**; **1***	MSP	**CGV**; **1***	BAR	RIS	KWA		17th	883	
2011	Jacombs Racing	27	Dodge	MSP	ICAR; 21	DEL	MSP	TOR; 1*	MPS	SAS	**CTR**; **2**	**CGV**; **1***	BAR	RIS	KWA			22nd	660	
2012	Jacombs Racing	27	Dodge	MSP; 4	ICAR; 1*	MSP; 7	DEL; 4	MPS; 11	EDM; 7	SAS; 6	CTR; 1*	CGV; 2	BAR; 2	RIS; 12	KWA; 2			3rd	483	
2013	Jacombs Racing	27	Dodge	MSP	DEL	MSP	**ICAR**; **1***	MPS	SAS	ASE	CTR; 2	RIS						23rd	131	
2013	DJK Racing	28	Dodge										MSP; 3	BAR	KWA			23rd	131	
2014	DJK Racing	27	Dodge	MSP; 21	ACD; 12	**ICAR**; **1***	EIR; 1	SAS; 4	ASE; 8	CTR; 2	RIS; 4*	**MSP**; **29**	BAR; 15	KWA; 23				6th	377	
2015	DJK Racing	27	Dodge	MSP; 9	ACD; 4	SSS; 20	ICAR; 2	EIR; 6	SAS; 3	ASE; 1	**CTR**; **2**	RIS; 3	**MSP**; **6***	KWA; 10				3rd	428	
2016	DJK Racing	27	Dodge	MSP; 1	SSS; 8	ACD; 8	ICAR; 1*	**TOR**; 2	EIR; 6	**SAS**; 5	CTR; 2	RIS; 14	MSP; 21	ASE; 8	KWA; 14			2nd	451	
2017	DJK Racing	27	Dodge	MSP; 2	**DEL**; 6	ACD; 9	ICAR; 2	**TOR**; 14	SAS; 10	SAS2; 7	EIR; QL^{†}	**CTR**; 2*	RIS; 5	MSP; 3	ASE; 8	JUK; 10		7th	454	
2018	DJK Racing	27	Dodge	MSP; 12	**JUK**; 5	ACD; 1	TOR; 1	SAS; 12	SAS; 10	EIR; 12	CTR; 15	RIS; 4	MSP; 8	ASE; 8	NHA; 16	JUK; 5		8th	474	
2019	DJK Racing	27	Dodge	MSP; 2	**JUK**; 1*	ACD; 4	TOR; 2	SAS; 3	SAS; 1*	EIR; 1*	CTR; 8	RIS; 7	MSP; 9	ASE; 3	NHA; 1	JUK; 4		1st	550	
2021	Rick Ware Racing	51	Dodge	SUN; 2	SUN; 16	CTR; 19	ICAR; 2	MSP; 19	MSP; 5	FLA; 1*	DEL; 3	DEL; 3	DEL; 1					2nd	381	
2022	Wight Motorsports Inc.	27	Chevy	SUN; 12	MSP; 24	ACD; 1	AVE; 20	TOR; 2	EDM; 3	SAS; 2	SAS; 2	CTR; 15	OSK; 7	ICAR; 5	MSP; 8	DEL; 19		8th	463	
2023	Wight Motorsports Inc.	27	Chevy	SUN; 17	MSP; 18	ACD; 20	AVE; 17	TOR; 5	EIR; 15	SAS; 6	SAS; 10	CTR; 29	OSK; 11	OSK; 3	ICAR; 6	MSP; 23	DEL; 4	10th	435	
2024	Wight Motorsports Inc.	27	Chevy	MSP; 8	ACD; 1	**AVE**; 1*	RIS; 6	RIS; 8	OSK; 2	SAS; 3	EIR; 7	CTR; 14	**ICAR**; 1	MSP; 4	DEL; 2	AMS; 19		3rd	488	
2025	Innovation Auto Sport	27	Chevy	MSP; 6	RIS; 4	EDM; 4	SAS; 8	CMP; 5	ACD; 14	CTR; 1*	**ICAR**; 2	**MSP**; 5	DEL; 4	DEL; 7	AMS; 6			3rd	470	
2026	Innovation Auto Sport	27	Chevy	MSP; 19	ACD; 5	ACD; 7	RIS; 7	AMS; 4	AMS; 6	CMP; 3	EIR	EIR	CTR; 4	MAR; 2	ICAR; 2	MSP; 1*	DEL; 8	5th	470	

^{†} Qualified but replaced by Larry Jackson
^{*} Season still in progress
^{1} Ineligible for series points

=== CASCAR ===
==== Castrol Super Series ====
Castrol Super Series results
Year	Team	No.	Make	1	2	3	4	5	6	7	8	9	10	11	Rank	Points	Ref
2006	Jacombs Racing	88	Ford	BAR	MOS	BAR	MPS	EDM	CTR	MOS	MTL	HAM	ASE; 13	KWA	41st	126	

=== ARCA Menards Series ===
(key) (Bold – Pole position awarded by qualifying time. Italics – Pole position earned by points standings or practice time. * – Most laps led.)

ARCA Menards Series results
Year	Team	No.	Make	1	2	3	4	5	6	7	8	9	10	11	12	13	14	15	16	17	18	19	20	21	AMSC	Pts	Ref
2008	DGM Racing	98	Chevy	DAY; DNQ	SLM	IOW	KAN	CAR	KEN	TOL	POC	MCH	CAY	KEN	BLN	POC	NSH	ISF	DSF	CHI	SLM	NJE	TAL	TOL	163rd	0	
2011	NDS Motorsports	53	Dodge	DAY	TAL	SLM	TOL	**NJE**; 1																	33rd	655	
2011	NDS Motorsports	53	Ford						CHI; 5	POC	MCH	WIN	BLN	IOW	IRP	POC	ISF	MAD	DSF; 5	SLM	KAN	TOL			33rd	655	
2012	NDS Motorsports	53	Dodge	DAY	MOB	SLM	TAL	TOL	ELK	POC	MCH	WIN	NJE; 1*	IOW	CHI	IRP	POC	BLN	ISF	MAD	SLM	DSF	KAN		80th	245	
2013	NDS Motorsports	53	Dodge	DAY	MOB	SLM	TAL	TOL	ELK	POC	MCH	**ROA**; 2*	WIN	CHI	**NJE**; 1	POC	BLN	ISF; DNQ	MAD	DSF	IOW	SLM	KEN	KAN	51st	515	
2014	NDS Motorsports	53	Dodge	DAY	MOB	SLM	TAL	TOL	**NJE**; 1	POC	MCH	ELK	WIN	CHI	IRP	POC	BLN	ISF	MAD	DSF	SLM	KEN	KAN		68th	245	
2026	NDS Motorsports	53	Chevy	DAY	PHO	KAN	TAL	GLN; 7	TOL	MCH	POC	BER	ELK	CHI	LRP; 2	IRP	IOW	ISF	MAD	DSF	SLM	BRI	KAN		55th	79	

== See also ==
- List of Canadians in Champ Car
- List of Canadians in NASCAR

Sporting positions
Preceded by Bruno Spengler	North American Fran Am 2000 Pro Champion; 2003	Succeeded by Colin Braun
Preceded by J. R. Fitzpatrick	NASCAR Canadian Tire Series Champion; 2007	Succeeded by Scott Steckly
Preceded by Scott Steckly	NASCAR Canadian Tire Series Champion; 2009	Succeeded by D. J. Kennington
