= Derek Lynch =

Canadian racing driver (born 1971)

Derek Lynch (born 16 June 1971) is a Canadian racing driver from Warkworth, Ontario who last competed in the NASCAR Pinty's Series.

== Racing career ==
Lynch began competing in the Busch North Series (now NASCAR K&N Pro Series East) in 1995. He raced in 16 of 22 events with a second-place finish at Beech Ridge Motor Speedway, pole positions at Holland International Speedway, Thompson Speedway and Beech Ridge, and a second top-ten finish at Jennerstown Speedway to finish 16th in season points. Lynch returned to the East series in 1996 racing in two events. He had a single start in 2000 and recorded a ninth-place finish at Loudon. He worked as a fabricator for NASCAR NEXTEL Cup teams Darrell Waltrip Motorsports in 1997 and 1998, Dale Earnhardt, Inc. in 1999, and Stavola Brothers Racing in 2000. He returned to racing in 2001 and 2002 in the Ontario Super Late Model Series.

Lynch raced in selected events and promoted at Kawartha Speedway before beginning to race in the CASCAR Super Series in 2005. He competed in five of twelve events and had three top-ten finishes at Toronto, Mosport, and Kawartha. Lynch returned to CASCAR in 2006, racing in five of eleven events. He had one top-ten finish that season with a fifth-place finish at Kawartha.

CASCAR was purchased by NASCAR for the 2007 series and the series was renamed the NASCAR Canadian Tire Series. Lynch raced in all twelve races for the first time in his career and finished fifth in points with eight top-ten finishes. He earned his first career Canadian Tire Series win at Cayuga Speedway Park on September 1, 2007. He was racing in third place in the final lap when Peter Gibbons and Jim Lapcevich spun while battling for the win. Lynch drove in all thirteen Canadian Tire Series races in 2008 in finished eleventh in points. He started the season with a fifth-place run at Cayuga, finished fourth at Barrie Speedway, and earned a season best third-place run at Cayuga's second race (Coke Zero 200). Lynch competed part-time in the Canadian Tires Series in 2009; he finished between eleventh and eighteenth at each event. He did not compete in a NASCAR series in 2010.
