= Riverside International Speedway =

Motorsports track in Canada

- Riverside's 45th Anniversary logo used in 2014.
- Location: Antigonish, Nova Scotia, Canada
- Coordinates: 45°33′49″N 62°07′59″W
- Capacity: 12,000
- Owner: The Chisholm Family (1969–1989, 2006–present); Erik Edward Vandaalen (1990–2005)
- Operator: The Chisholm Family (1969–1989, 2006–present); Erik Edward Vandaalen (1990–2005)
- Broke ground: 1968
- Opened: 18 May 1969; 57 years ago
- Major events: Current: NASCAR Canada Series; Pinty's 300 (2007–2019, 2024–present); Choko 150 (2024); Maritime Pro Stock Tour (2001–present); IWK 250 (1977–1981, 1986–1999, 2006–present); Former: Pro All Stars Series (2006−2007); American Canadian Tour (1981, 1985, 1991–1992)
- Website: http://www.riversidespeedway.ca/

Paved Oval (1969–present)
- Surface: Asphalt
- Length: 0.333 mi (0.536 km)
- Turns: 4
- Banking: 14° Turns; 5° Front straightaway 5° Back straightaway

Riverside International Speedway is a 0.333 mi (0.536 km), high banked, asphalt short track located in James River, Nova Scotia, Canada, about 10 km (6.2 mi) southwest of the town of Antigonish.

== Track history ==
Riverside International Speedway started out as a dream Antigonish businessman John Chisholm, who was an avid racing fan and was determined to advance his favourite sport in his home province. In 1967 Chisholm flew down to Bristol Motor Speedway and met with NASCAR co-founder Bill France Sr., who gave him permission to model the track after a scaled-down version of Bristol. Chisholm and his team began construction on the speedway in 1968 in James River, Nova Scotia. The project was completed a year later and opened its doors for the first time on May 18, 1969.

In 1975 Riverside played host to its first celebrity driver when Benny Parsons visited the track to compete in the NASCAR Canada series race, just a few months removed from his Daytona 500 win. This was the first time that a major stock car driver visited the region to compete in a race. The race also featured a purse of $7500, the largest in the region at that time.

In 1977, under new track promoters Jerry Lawrence and Ron King, Riverside hosted its first 250 lap race, a staple that soon became an annual tradition.

Chisholm sold the track to local resident Erik Edward Vandaalen in 1989. Vandaalen owned the track until his unexpected death on Dec 25th 2005, at which point John Chisholm subsequently bought it back in 2006. Upon regaining ownership of the track, Chisholm began a major renovation project. The renovation consisted of repaving the entire track, replacing the metal guardrails with concrete walls, rebuilding and enlarging the grandstands, and constructing a new press box with VIP seating. The restroom facilities were completely rebuilt, the sound and lighting systems were replaced, an electronic scoreboard was installed, and the parking and campground capacity was increased.

In 2007 Riverside became the only Canadian racetrack East of Quebec to be sanctioned by NASCAR when it was named to the schedule of the newly formed NASCAR Canadian Tire Series. The first Canadian Tire Series race was held on September 16, 2007. Peter Gibbons dominated the race, sitting on the pole and leading 201 laps before a rear end problem forced him to the garage. This set the stage for Mark Dilley to take home the checkered flag for his first career Canadian Tire Series win.

Riverside played host to the Richard Petty Driving Experience as the final stop on their first ever Canadian Summer Tour on July 24, 2011. Two of the programs three experiences were available to fans at the track, including their signature 12-lap “Rookie Experience,” and the “High-Speed Ride-Along”, which simulates a qualifying run with a professional instructor. The track hosted the Richard Petty Driving Experience on their second Canadian Summer Tour in 2012, once again offering the “Rookie Experience,” and the “High-Speed Ride-Along”.

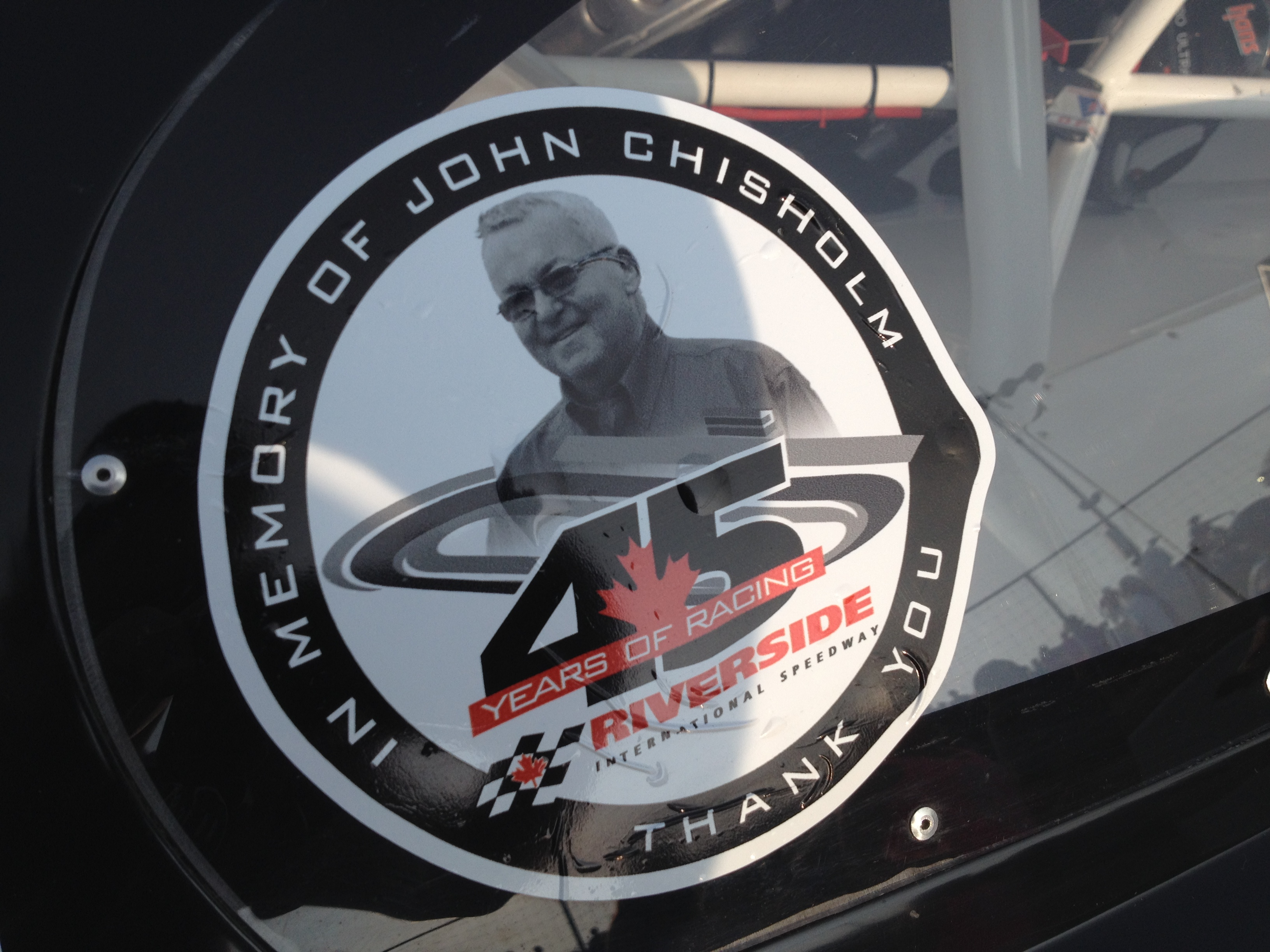
The decal commemorating the life of John Chisholm that was on all the cars during the 2014 IWK 250

On August 18, 2012, Mike Stevens drove his #4 R Stevens Mechanical Chevrolet Impala to victory lane in dominating fashion at the 2012 Lucas Oil 100. Stevens started the race from the pole position, putting up a qualifying time of 14.336 seconds, and led all 100 laps in the caution free race. The win was his second of the Parts for Trucks Pro Stock Tour season, both coming at Riverside. The win turned out to be the final win of Stevens' career as less than a year later, on August 3, 2013, Stevens would succumb to injuries sustained in a crash at Oyster Bed Speedway.

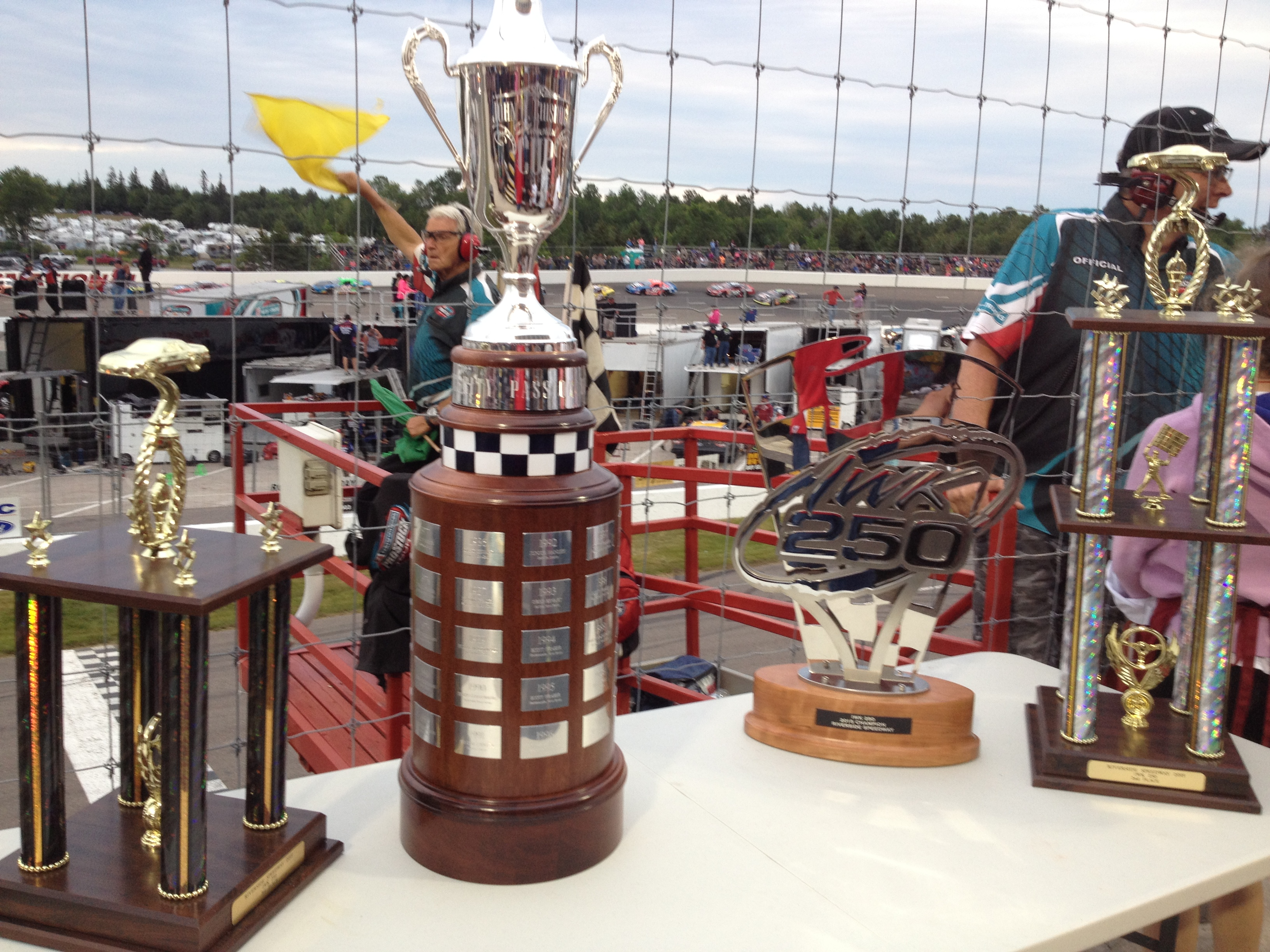
From left to right: IWK 250 3rd Place Trophy, John W. Chisholm Memorial Cup, IWK 250 Trophy Presented by Steve Lewis Auto Body, IWK 250 2nd Place Trophy

Track owner John Chisholm died on July 4, 2014, at the age of 68. Ownership of the track was transferred to his family. The 2014 IWK 250 was dedicated in Chisholm's honour, with all the cars in the race carrying a special decal commemorating his life and saying thanks.

On August 16, 2014, Donald Chisholm, just two months following the death of his father, took home an emotional victory in the NASCAR Canadian Tire Series Wilson Equipment 300. The victory was a first for Chisholm in the series, who also earned his first career pole in the event.

Prior to the 2015 IWK 250 Riverside unveiled the John W. Chisholm Memorial Cup. Past 250 winners such as John Flemming, Rollie MacDonald, and Kent Vincent, along with the Chisholm Family attended the unveiling. The Cup is a handmade silver cup that not only recognizes future and past winners of the IWK 250 but also recognizes the winners of the annual Riverside 250 from 1977 to 2006 with plaques on the base. The traditional IWK 250 Trophy Presented by Steve Lewis Auto Body will continue to be awarded alongside the John W. Chisholm Memorial Cup.

== IWK 250 ==
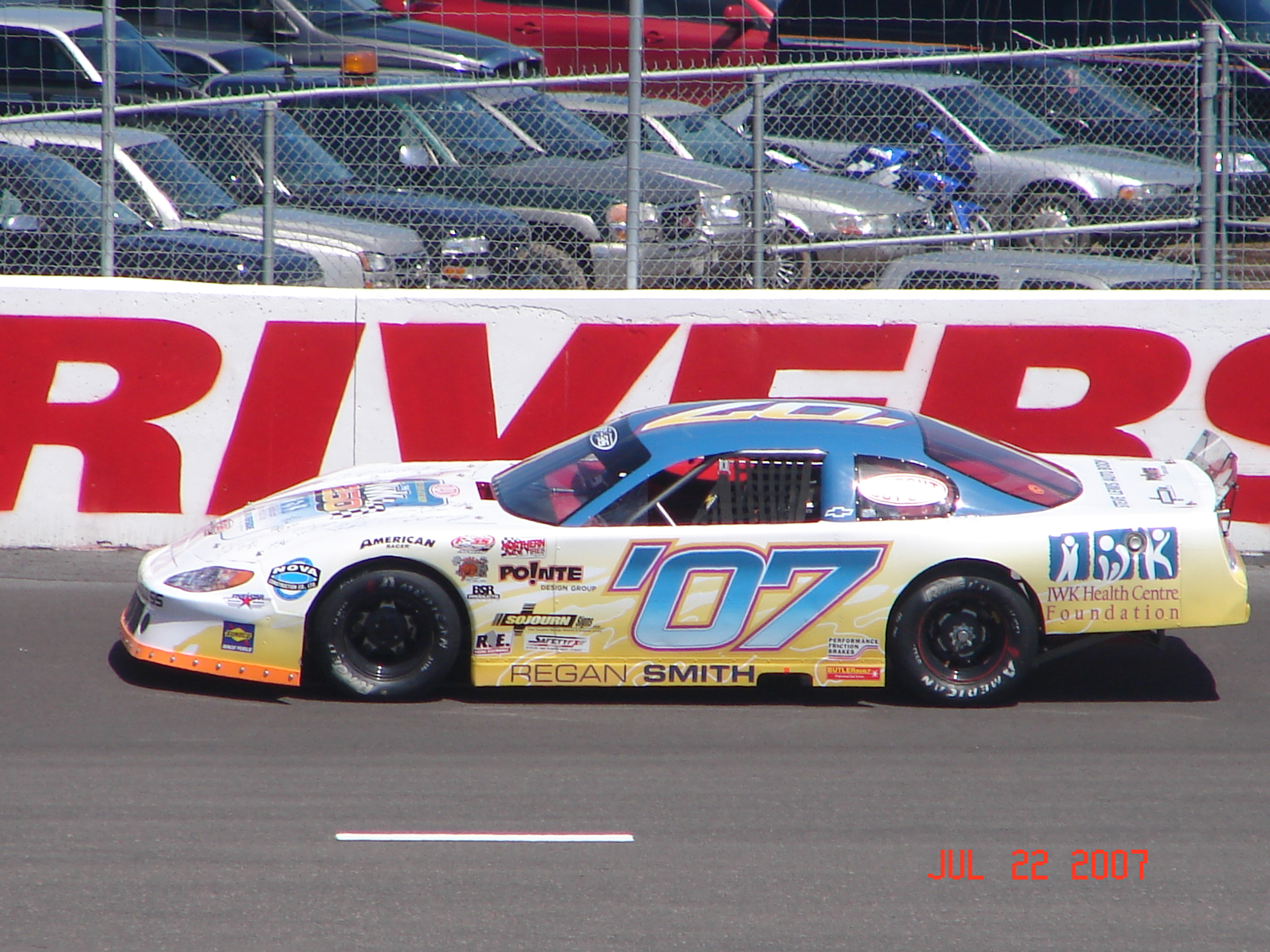
Regan Smith on the backstretch during practice for the 2007 IWK 250

The primer event at Riverside is the IWK 250. In 2007 the annual 250 mile race at the track was repurposed to raise money and garner support for the IWK Health Centre in Halifax, Nova Scotia. It has since become one of the premier Late Model races in North America, attracting national attention, as well as some of the sports top drivers, including NASCAR Champions Brad Keselowski and Matt Crafton, V8 Supercars Champion Marcos Ambrose, and Daytona 500 winner Joey Logano.

== Track design ==
Riverside International Speedway is designed as a scaled-down version of the famed Bristol Motor Speedway in Bristol, Tennessee.

In 1967 track builder John Chisholm called up NASCAR co-founder Bill France Sr. and told him about his intentions of building a half mile racetrack in Nova Scotia. Big Bill told Chisholm that a half mile track would be too hard on the cars, tires and engines and invited him and his surveyors down to Bristol to get the dimensions of the track and then shrink them down. Chisholm and his crew did just that and started construction of Riverside in 1968.

The track is designed as an asphalt oval that is 0.333 mi (0.536 km) in length with 14° banking in the turns, and 5° banking on both straightaways.

== Races ==
=== Current ===
- NASCAR Canada Series (2007−2019, 2024−present)
- Maritime Pro Stock Tour (2001–present)
  - IWK 250 Presented by Steve Lewis Auto Body (2008−present)
  - Ron MacGillivray Chev Buick GMC 150
  - Lucas Oil 150
- Napa Sportsman Series (2006−present)
  - Highland Home Building Centre 50
  - Highland Home Building Centres 100 (1)
  - Highland Home Building Centres 100 (2)
  - Napa Sportsman Series 50
- Maritime League of Legends (2005−present)
  - Maritime Legends Challenge

=== Former ===
- American Canadian Tour (1981, 1985, 1991−1992)
- Atlantic Open Wheel (2006−2008)
- MASCAR (1983−2000)
- North Eastern Midget Association (1970)
- Pro All Stars Series (2006−2007)

== Notable drivers ==
Here are a list of notable drivers who have found success in NASCAR's top tier series who have raced at Riverside Speedway

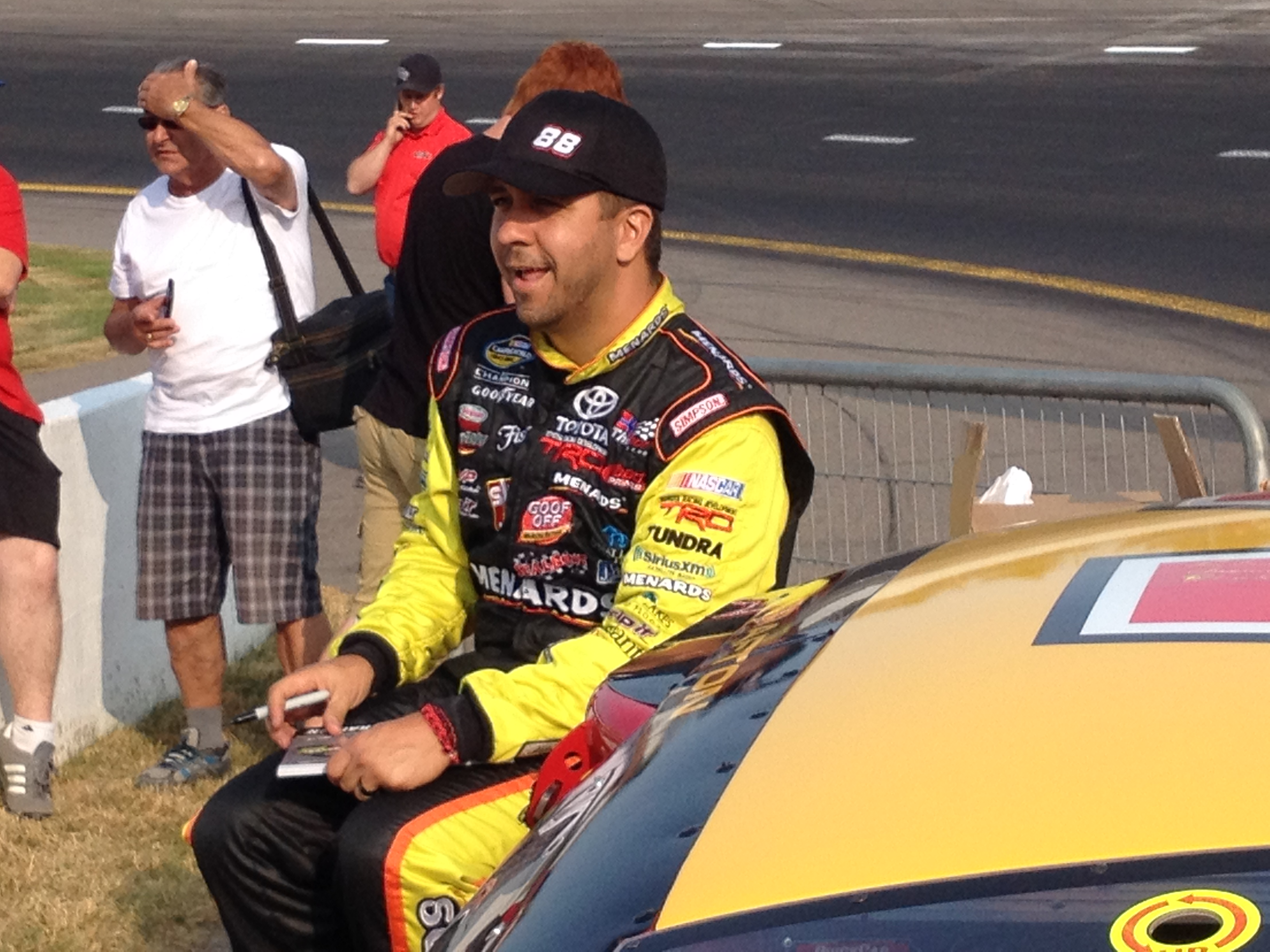
Matt Crafton signing autographs at the 2014 IWK 250

- Benny Parsons
- Kevin Lepage
- Randy LaJoie
- Kelly Moore
- Ricky Craven
- Regan Smith
- Aric Almirola
- David Reutimann
- Marcos Ambrose
- Joey Logano
- Brad Keselowski
- Matt Crafton
- Mark Martin

== Notable race results ==
=== Bumper to Bumper 300 results ===
NASCAR Pinty's Series – Bumper to Bumper 300 Results
Year	Date	Winner	Car Owner	Manufacturer	Race Distance		Race Time	Average Speed (mph)	Report
Year	Date	Winner	Car Owner	Manufacturer	Laps	Miles (km)	Race Time	Average Speed (mph)	Report
2007	Sept 16	Mark Dilley	Dave Dilley	Dodge	300	99.9 (160.774)	1:49:16	54.857	
2008	Sept 20	Don Thompson Jr.	John Fitzpatrick	Chevrolet	300	99.9 (160.774)	1:51:38	53.694	
2009	Sept 20	Andrew Ranger	Dave Jacombs	Ford	300	99.9 (160.774)	1:30:40	66.110	
2010	Sept 18	D. J. Kennington	Doug Kennington	Dodge	300	99.9 (160.774)	1:44:47	57.204	
2011	Sept 17	Scott Steckly	Scott Steckly	Dodge	300	99.9 (160.774)	1:30:45	66.050	
2012	Sept 15	D. J. Kennington	Doug Kennington	Dodge	300	99.9 (160.774)	1:36:14	62.286	
2013	Aug 17	Jason Hathaway	Ed Hakonson	Dodge	300	99.9 (160.774)	1:50:21	54.318	
2014	Aug 16	Donald Chisholm	D. J. Kennington	Ford	300	99.9 (160.774)	1:41:55	58.813	
2015	Aug 15	Scott Steckly	Scott Steckly	Dodge	300	99.9 (160.774)	1:46:24	56.335	
2016	Aug 20	Cayden Lapcevich	Sherri Lapcevich	Dodge	300	99.9 (160.774)	1:41:46	58.899	
2017	Aug 20	Alex Labbé	Alain Lord Mounir	Ford	300	99.9 (160.774)	1:41:23	59.122	

== Records ==
=== NASCAR Pinty's Series Records ===
(As of 14/10/17)

Most Wins	2	Scott Steckly; D. J. Kennington Kevin Lacroix
Most Top 5s	8	Mark Dilley
Most Top 10s	11	Mark Dilley
Starts	11	Mark Dilley; D. J. Kennington; Donald Chisholm
Poles	3	Scott Steckly
Most Laps Completed	3291	Mark Dilley
Most Laps Led	722	Scott Steckly
Avg. Start*	3.9	D. J. Kennington
Avg. Finish*	4.8	Mark Dilley

* from minimum 3 starts
