= NASCAR Canada Series =

Canadian stock car racing series

- Category: Stock cars
- Country: Canada; United States
- Inaugural season: 2007
- Manufacturers: Chevrolet · Dodge · Ford
- Tire suppliers: McCreary Tire
- Drivers' champion: Marc-Antoine Camirand
- Makes' champion: Chevrolet
- Official website: www.nascar.ca

The NASCAR Canada Series (NCS, French: Série NASCAR Canada) is a national NASCAR racing series in Canada, and is a continuation of the old CASCAR Super Series which was founded in 1981. It is the top NASCAR touring series in Canada.

== History ==
In September 2006 NASCAR purchased the CASCAR Super Series, the top Canadian stock-car racing series at the time. At the same time, they established a sponsorship agreement with Canadian Tire as the title sponsor. They also signed a television contract with TSN to carry all events with select races being aired live. Three of the series races, Edmonton, Toronto and Montreal, had crowds in excess of 50,000 fans.

The 2007 season was the inaugural season for the series with the first event being held on May 26, 2007, at Cayuga Motor Speedway with Don Thomson Jr. winning in a spirited battle. Andrew Ranger, in his first year of stock-car competition, won the second race, at Mosport International Raceway. He took over the lead in the points standings after that event and never relinquished it on his way to the first championship. The first season saw five races decided on last-lap passes.

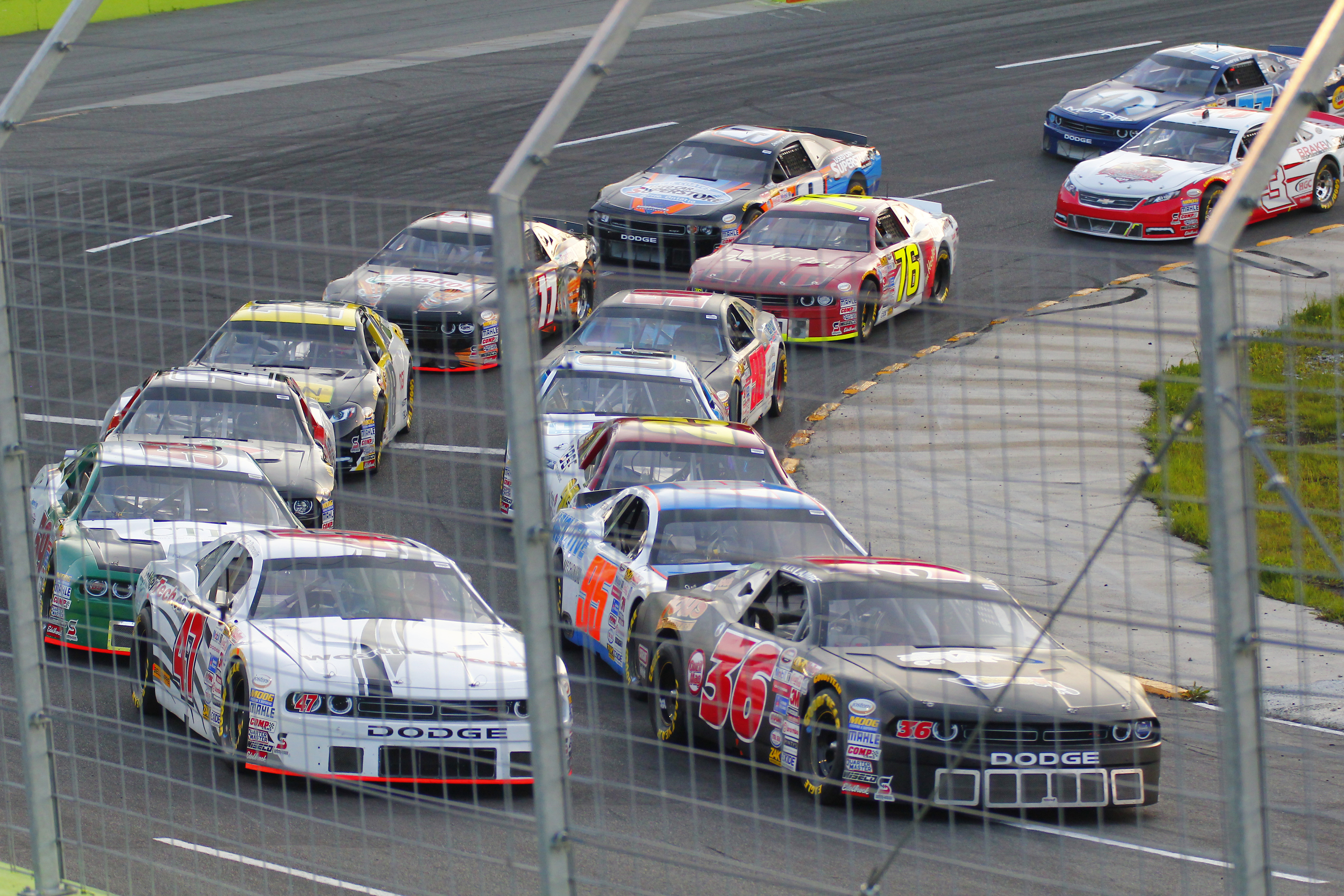
NASCAR Pinty's Series cars at Autodrome Chaudiere in 2015

The 2008 season featured Scott Steckly who dominated many events. He won three of the first four events of the year and held the lead in the driver championship point standings all season long. He set a series record with four victories throughout the year.

The third season had Andrew Ranger taking centre stage by winning his second series championship in three seasons. He completed his transition from the open-wheel racing world by incorporating his road courses experience with a strong performances on the oval tracks. During the season, he won a single-season series record six races—three on road courses and three on ovals.

The 2010 season belonged to D. J. Kennington. He won his first series title on the power of five wins, nine top-fives and eleven top-10 finishes. Kennington battled J. R. Fitzpatrick for the points lead all season as the two exchanged the top spot an unprecedented five times. Kennington also finished second to fellow Pinty's Series competitor Jason Bowles in the Toyota All-Star Showdown.

In 2011, Steckly had a strong season where he won three events and finished in the runner-up position four times on his way to capture his second championship over Kennington, who had a pair of wins. Long-time road racer Robin Buck and rookie Peter Shepherd won their first events. Ranger won the two biggest events of the year in dominant fashion at Montreal and Toronto. Former champion Don Thomson Jr. retired after a lengthy career.

In 2012, Kennington won a record seven events, including five consecutively, during the summer. Kennington won his second championship in three years. He faced competition from runners-up J. R. Fitzpatrick and Ranger who both won two events.

In 2013, Steckly won four events, including three in a row. Steckly won his third championship in six years. Louis-Philippe Dumoulin won the season opening race at Canadian Tire Motorsport Park, his first victory in the series with veteran Jeff Lapevich finishing in the runner up position. Peter Shepherd would win the next two events with Andrew Ranger winning the 4th event of the season. Steckly won the title by only two points over D. J. Kennington.

In 2014, L.P. Dumoulin would win his first career championship. He would win two events this season. Other drivers to win this season include J. R. Fitzpatrick, Andrew Ranger, Scott Steckly, Jason Hathaway and Donald Chisholm. Dumoulin would win the title by only three points over Fitzpatrick.

On February 17, 2015, Canadian Tire did not renew their sponsorship of the series after the 2015 season. On December 7, NASCAR and Pinty's Delicious Foods Inc. signed a six-year agreement to sponsor the series beginning with the 2016 season.

The 2018 Pinty's Series also included its first race in the United States, at New Hampshire Motor Speedway, replacing the Monster Energy NASCAR Cup Series on their fall race weekend that continues to feature the NASCAR K&N Pro Series East and the NASCAR Whelen Modified Tour, now the featured division with the Musket 250.

For the 2019 season Continental AG replaced Goodyear as exclusive tire supplier for the series with their General Tire branding. Also it was announced that all races would be live in the United States through fanschoice.tv and six races live through TSN in Canada. In December 2019, NASCAR changed their schedule. The series would be returning to two previous tracks - Sunset Speedway and Circuit ICAR. The series was also set to produce their first-ever dirt race at Ohsweken Speedway in August 2020. Rescheduled for August 2022.

Because of the COVID-19 Pandemic, a shortened 2020 season called the Pinty's Fan Cave Challenge was completed that consisted of six races at three tracks. Sunset Speedway, Flamboro Speedway and Jukasa Motor Speedway played host to three double race weekends that made up the entire season.

On November 21, 2023, it was announced that the series would be renamed into the NASCAR Canada Series, with Pinty's and Evirum serving as presenting partners.

== Diversity ==
Pinty's Series logo from 2015 to 2017

The NASCAR Pinty's Series contains drivers with many different agendas and backgrounds. Veteran Canadian drivers compete in the series on a part-time basis for fun while maintaining full-time careers, while others are serious championship contenders. In recent years, a NASCAR regional series driver from the United States will often run in the races to gain experience and with NASCAR's specification engine rule. Drivers include Cale Gale, Jason Bowles, Timmy Hill, Tony Stewart, Dave Blaney and Austin Dillon. Drivers with open-wheel and road racing backgrounds have also attempted races, including, Jacques Villeneuve, Max Papis, Alex Tagliani, Jean-François Dumoulin and Patrick Carpentier. Even former National Hockey League player Patrice Brisebois runs in the major events which now feature over 40 cars.

In 2011, at Circuit Gilles Villeneuve, a record three female drivers, Maryeve Dufault, Caitlin Johnston and Isabelle Tremblay, attempted the event.

The series is a development, or feeder, series for NASCAR's top national touring divisions. Drivers like Fitzpatrick, Kennington, Ranger, Steckly and Thomson Jr. have competed in the Xfinity Series, while Pierre Bourque and Derek White have raced in the Camping World Truck Series. Ranger finished third in the 2009 NASCAR Nationwide Series event in Montreal after battling with eventual race winner Carl Edwards for much of the race. He competed in the 2011 Sprint Cup Series event at Watkins Glen for FAS Lane Racing finishing 35th after suffering from transmission failure.

On June 2, 2019, Julia Landauer became the first woman in NASCAR Canada history to lead a lap when she led lap 72 of the APC 200 at Jukasa Motor Speedway.

On August 15, 2022, Aaron Turkey became the first indigenous person to win, at the First ever NASCAR Event on Dirt. (The Pinty's 100 - Quick Wick Hot Lap Winner) at Ohsweken Speedway in Six Nations.

== Tracks ==
Races in the NASCAR Canada Series as of 2026. Yellow dots represent paved ovals, blue dots represent road courses, cyan dots represent street circuits orange dots represent dirt ovals.

The following are the tracks which have been, and are currently used in the NASCAR Canada Series:

Years	Track	Location	Type	Paved oval track
2014–2019, 2022–present	Autodrome Chaudière	Vallée-Jonction, Quebec	1/4-mile oval	Yes
2024–present	Autodrome Montmagny	Montmagny, Quebec	3/8-mile oval	Yes
2008–2010, 2013–2019	Autodrome Saint-Eustache	Saint-Eustache, Quebec	2/5-mile oval	Yes
2007–2014	Barrie Speedway	Barrie, Ontario	1/3-mile tri-oval	Yes
2025–present	Calabogie Motorsports Park	Greater Madawaska, Ontario	Road course	No
2007–2019, 2021–present	Canadian Tire Motorsport Park	Bowmanville, Ontario	Road course	No
2007–2013	Canadian Tire Motorsport Park Speedway	Bowmanville, Ontario	1/2-mile paper clip oval	Yes
2007–2012	Circuit Gilles Villeneuve	Montreal, Quebec	Semi-permanent road course	No
2011–2017, 2021, 2023–present	Circuit ICAR	Mirabel, Quebec	Road course	No
2007–2019, 2021–present	Circuit Trois-Rivières	Trois-Rivières, Quebec	Street circuit	No
2009–2013, 2017, 2021–present	Delaware Speedway	Delaware, Ontario	1/2-mile oval	Yes
2022–2024	Eastbound International Speedway	Avondale, Newfoundland and Labrador	3/8-mile oval	Yes
2007–2010, 2012	Edmonton Indy	Edmonton, Alberta	Airport street circuit	No
2014–2019, 2022–present	Edmonton International Raceway	Wetaskiwin, Alberta	1/4-mile oval	Yes
2010–2011, 2016–2019, 2022–2023	Exhibition Place	Toronto, Ontario	Street circuit	No
2020–2021	Flamboro Speedway	Millgrove, Ontario	1/3-mile oval	Yes
2007–2008, 2017–2020	Jukasa Motor Speedway	Cayuga, Ontario	5/8-mile oval	Yes
2007–2016	Kawartha Speedway	Peterborough, Ontario	3/8-mile oval	Yes
2026	Markham Street Circuit	Markham, Ontario	Street circuit	No
2007–2013	Motoplex Speedway	Vernon, British Columbia	1/2-mile D-shaped oval	Yes
2018–2019	New Hampshire Motor Speedway	Loudon, New Hampshire	1.058-mile oval	Yes
2022–2024	Ohsweken Speedway	Ohsweken, Ontario	3/8-mile dirt track	No
2007–2019, 2024–present	Riverside International Speedway	Antigonish, Nova Scotia	1/3-mile oval	Yes
2015–2016, 2020–2023	Sunset Speedway	Innisfil, Ontario	1/3-mile oval	Yes
2009–2019, 2022–2025	Sutherland Automotive Speedway	Saskatoon, Saskatchewan	1/3-mile oval	Yes

== Cars ==
A gradual implementation of both competition and safety-based modifications have been made to the cars used in the CASCAR Super Series. These include a move to Goodyear 9.5" tires, the same size that is used in all NASCAR stock-car series, on-dash electrical and ignition systems, in-car fire-suppression equipment and increased fuel cell protection. In 2009, the option of utilizing the NASCAR spec engine program was introduced. The cars use steel tube-framed silhouette stock cars powered by carbureted V8 engines. The cars have a relatively high minimum weight, so development of lightweight components is minimal. A number of components are specified by the rules, as parity is given priority over vehicle development. Manufacturer involvement is therefore limited largely to supply arrangements for long-developed crate motors, and branding on the largely standard bodywork.

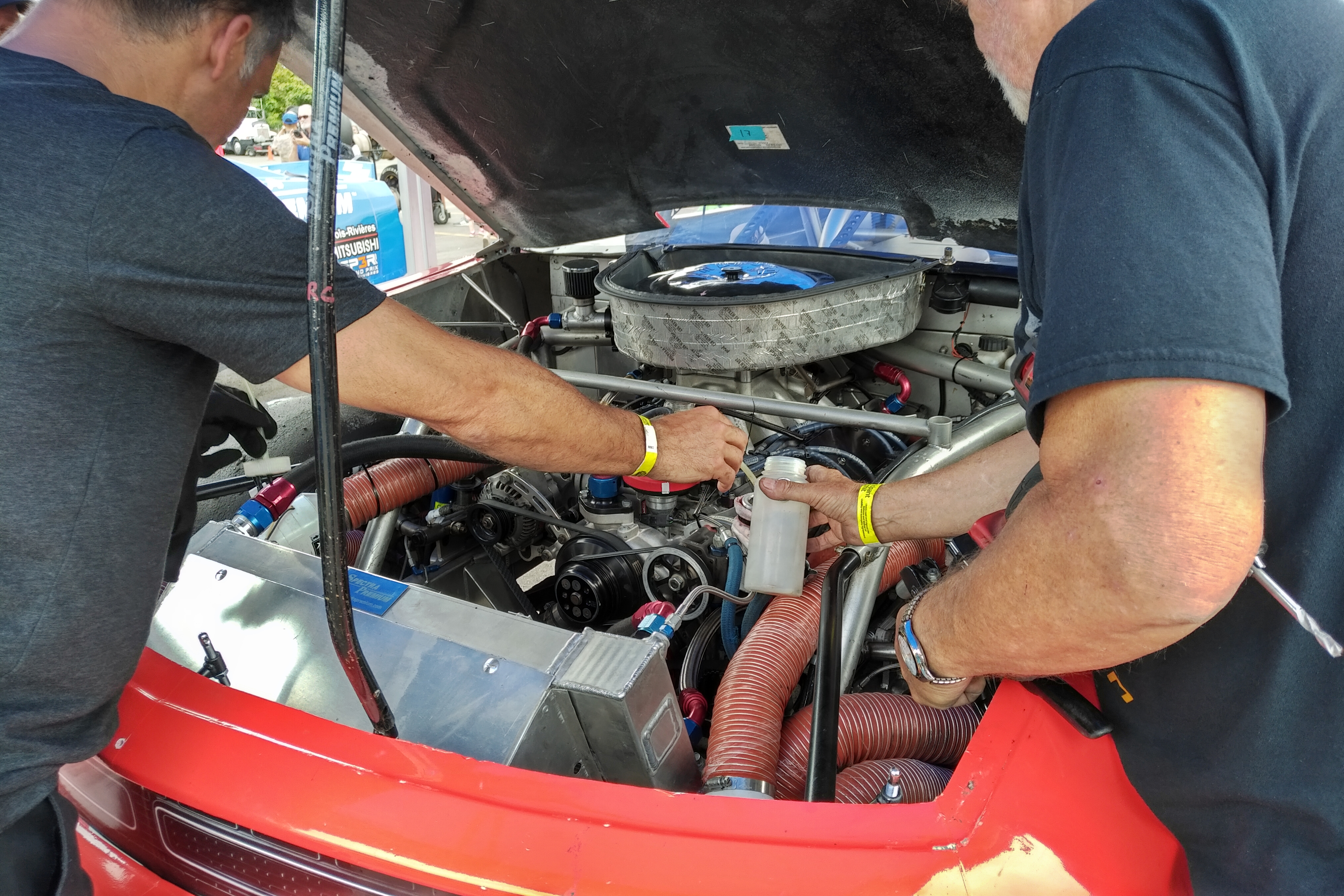
The engine used in a Pinty's Series Dodge Challenger

=== Specifications ===
- Power: 525 hp (391 kW)
- Weight: 3,050 lb (1,380 kg)
- Height: 49 in (1,245 mm)
- Length: 198 in (5,029 mm)
- Wheelbase: 107.5 in (2,730 mm)
- Width: 75 in (1,905 mm)

=== Manufacturer representation ===
Types of cars used include the Ford Mustang, Ford Fusion, Chevrolet Camaro, and Dodge Challenger. The NASCAR Pinty's Series was the last NASCAR series in which Dodge still provided factory support, as the series was supported by the Canadian arm of Fiat Automobili, S.p.A., having pulled out of the United States and Mexican series after 2012. Factory support ended before the shortened 2020 season. It is also one of two series Toyota does not participate in, the other being the NASCAR Brasil Sprint Race; it was also the last NASCAR series which had factory support from Pontiac prior to going out of business in 2010 after General Motors's Chapter 11 bankruptcy.

Fiat Chrysler Automobiles
- Dodge Avenger: 2007–2010
- Dodge Charger: 2007–2010
- Dodge Challenger: 2011–2019

Ford Motor Company
- Ford Fusion: 2007–present
- Ford Mustang: 2022–present

General Motors
- Chevrolet Monte Carlo SS: 2007–2009
- Pontiac: 2007–2009
- Chevrolet Impala: 2009–2017
- Chevrolet Camaro: 2018–present

== List of series champions ==
Scott Steckly and Marc-Antoine Camirand are tied with the most Canada Series championships with four each.

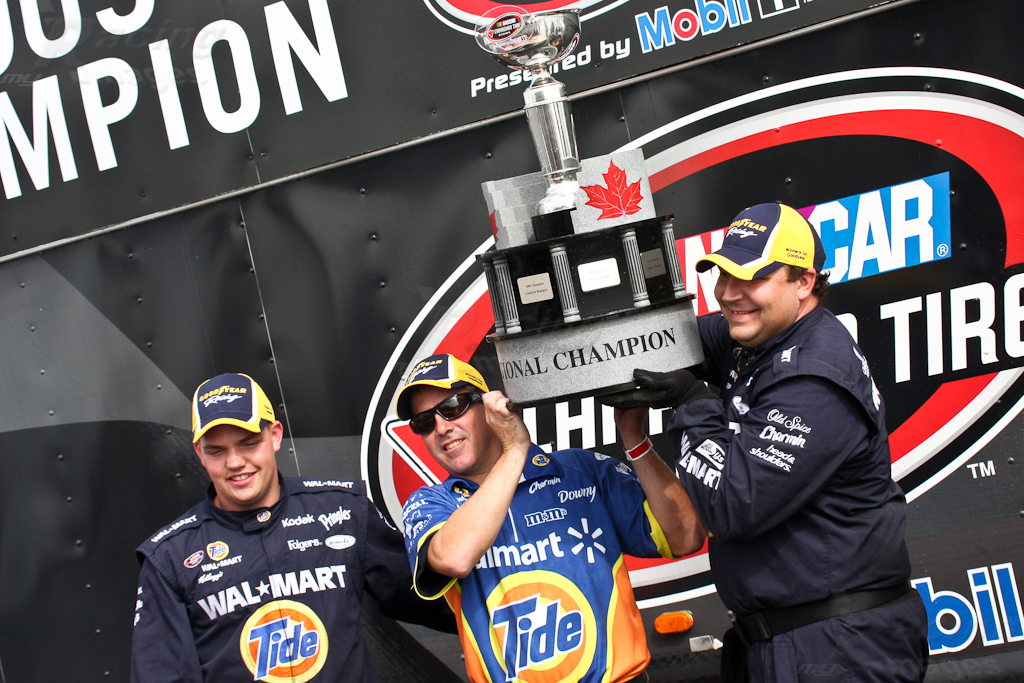
The No. 27 team celebrates their 2009 championship

Year	Champion	Owner	Make	No.	Points (margin)	Manufacturers' champion
2007	Andrew Ranger (1)	Dave Jacombs	Ford	27	1896 (103)	Ford
2008	Scott Steckly (1)	Scott Steckly	Dodge	22	2070 (24)	Dodge
2009	Andrew Ranger (2)	David Jacombs	Ford	27	2190 (167)	Ford
2010	D. J. Kennington (1)	Doug Kennington	Dodge	17	2117 (87)	Dodge
2011	Scott Steckly (2)	Scott Steckly	Dodge	22	1960 (79)	Dodge
2012	D. J. Kennington (2)	Doug Kennington	Dodge	17	517 (27)	Dodge
2013	Scott Steckly (3)	Scott Steckly	Dodge	22	473 (2)	Dodge
2014	L. P. Dumoulin (1)	Marc-André Bergeron	Dodge	47	453 (3)	Dodge
2015	Scott Steckly (4)	Scott Steckly	Dodge	22	446 (4)	Dodge
2016	Cayden Lapcevich	Sherri Lapcevich	Dodge	76	505 (54)	Dodge
2017	Alex Labbé	Alain Lord Mounir	Ford	32	542 (16)	Ford
2018	L. P. Dumoulin (2)	Marc-André Bergeron	Dodge	47	523 (7)	Dodge
2019	Andrew Ranger (3)	Doug Kennington	Dodge	27	550 (11)	Dodge
2020	Jason Hathaway	Ed Hakonson	Chevrolet	3	265 (14)	Chevrolet
2021	L. P. Dumoulin (3)	Marc-André Bergeron	Dodge	47	389 (8)	Dodge
2022	Marc-Antoine Camirand	Jean Claude Paille	Chevrolet	96	523 (27)	Chevrolet
2023	Treyten Lapcevich	Scott Steckly	Chevrolet	20	612 (61)	Chevrolet
2024	Marc-Antoine Camirand (2)	Jean Claude Paille	Chevrolet	96	510 (20)	Chevrolet
2025	Marc-Antoine Camirand (3)	Jean Claude Paille	Chevrolet	96	499 (23)	Chevrolet
2026	Marc-Antoine Camirand (4)	Jean Claude Paille	Chevrolet	96	—	Chevrolet

== All-time wins ==
All-time wins under the NASCAR banner, starting at 2007 season. Does not include CASCAR SuperSeries wins. As of the 2025 NASCAR Canada Series season.

Driver	Wins
Andrew Ranger	34
D. J. Kennington	25
Kevin Lacroix	25
Scott Steckly	19
Marc-Antoine Camirand	18
Jason Hathaway	14
Alex Tagliani	12
J. R. Fitzpatrick	11
L. P. Dumoulin	11
Treyten Lapcevich	9
Don Thomson Jr.	7
Cayden Lapcevich	6
Alex Labbé	6
Peter Shepherd III	5
Mark Dilley	3
Kerry Micks	3
Donald Theetge	3
Raphaël Lessard	3
Robin Buck	2
Donald Chisholm	1
Alex Guenette	1
Gary Klutt	1
Derek Lynch	1
Cole Powell	1
Ken Schrader	1
Brett Taylor	1
Brandon Watson	1
Dave Whitlock	1
Connor Bell	1
Will Larue	1
