= Kawartha Speedway =

Racetrack

Kawartha Downs & Speedway
- Location: 1382 County Road 28; Fraserville, Ontario, Canada; K0L 1V0
- Coordinates: 44°12′32″N 78°23′29″W
- Broke ground: 1970
- Opened: 1972 (as Horse Track); 1999 (as Speedway)
- Major events: Former: NASCAR Pinty's Series; Pinty's 250 (2007–2016); OSCAAR (2017–2018); American Canadian Tour (2007–2009); CASCAR Super Series (2001–2002, 2004–2006)
- Website: https://www.kawarthadowns.com/

Speedway (1999–present)
- Surface: Asphalt
- Length: 0.375 mi (0.604 km)

Harness Racing Horse Track (1972–present)
- Length: 0.625 mi (1.006 km)

Soap Box Derby track

Kawartha Speedway is a 0.375 mi (0.604 km) paved oval located in Fraserville, Ontario, approximately 10 km (6.2 mi) southwest of Peterborough. The paved track is within the harness racing track, temporary grandstands are brought onto the harness racing tracks surface. In 2006, Kawartha Speedway held the final CASCAR Super Series race before it became the NASCAR Canadian Tire Series in 2007. Since 2004, Kawartha was the host of the CASCAR Super Series finale. Kawartha Speedway held the finale of the inaugural NASCAR Canadian Tire Series Season which was won by Scott Steckly. The following year, Jason Hathaway picked up his first ever win, and in 2009 D. J. Kennington won.

The facility is also host to a number of other racing venues. After some additional paving of the infield, Kawartha Durham Kart Club made the speedway its home track in 2009. With a variety of track layouts it has proven to be a popular venue within the karting community. The Peterborough Motor Sports Club also hosts solo events as part of the club's championship season, bringing in a wide variety of vehicles from stock to fully modified rally cars. There is also a specially constructed course for soap box cars. The 'Gravity Cavity' is located behind the parking lot and hosts a championship series for soap box enthusiasts.

== Summer Shoot-Out Series ==
In an attempt to raise diminishing car counts all over Southern Ontario, Kawartha Speedway announced a 6 race late model series, split between Kawartha and Capital City Speedway in Stittsville, Ontario. Three events were held at Kawartha and three at the Capital City Speedway. All events were 100 laps with the exception of a July race at Kawartha which was 200 laps, called the ACT Summer Sizzler.

== See also ==
- List of auto racing tracks in Canada
- Peterborough Speedway
- Mosport Speedway
