= Kennedy =

Kennedy may refer to:

== People ==
- Kennedy (surname), including any of several people with that surname
  - Kennedy family, a prominent American political family that includes:
    - P.J. Kennedy (1858–1929), American businessman and politician
    - Joseph P. Kennedy Sr. (1888–1969), American businessman, investor, philanthropist, and politician
    - Joseph P. Kennedy Jr. (1915–1944) American naval aviator who was a lieutenant in the U.S. Navy
    - John F. Kennedy (1917–1963), 35th president of the United States from 1961 to 1963
    - John F. Kennedy Jr. (1960–1999), American businessman, attorney, magazine publisher, and journalist
    - Robert F. Kennedy (1925–1968), 64th United States attorney general and U.S. senator from New York
    - Robert F. Kennedy Jr. (born 1954), American politician and environmental lawyer
    - Ted Kennedy (1932–2009), U.S. senator from Massachusetts
  - John Kennedy (Louisiana politician) (born 1951), U.S. senator from Louisiana
  - Anthony Kennedy (born 1936), U.S. Supreme Court justice from 1988 to 2018
- Kennedy (commentator) (born 1972), Fox News commentator Lisa Kennedy Montgomery, who uses "Kennedy" as a stage name
- Kennedy (given name), including any of several people with that given name

=== Families ===
- Kennedy (Ireland), or O'Kennedy, a royal dynasty
- Clan Kennedy, of Scotland

=== Fictional characters ===
- Leon S. Kennedy, a fictional character in Resident Evil
- Kennedy (Buffy the Vampire Slayer), a fictional character in Buffy the Vampire Slayer

== Places ==
=== Australia ===
- Kennedy, Queensland, a locality in the Cassowary Coast Region, Queensland, Australia
- Division of Kennedy, a Federal electoral district in Queensland, Australia
- Electoral district of Kennedy, a former State electoral district in Queensland, Australia
- Port Kennedy, Western Australia

=== Brazil ===
- Presidente Kennedy, Espírito Santo, a municipality in Brazil
- Presidente Kennedy, Tocantins, a municipality in Brazil

=== Canada ===
- Kennedy station, an intermodal transit hub located in Toronto, Ontario
- Kennedy, Saskatchewan
- Kennedys, Ontario, a community within the township of Strong, Ontario
- Kennedy Channel, a sea passage between Canada and Greenland

=== China ===
- Kennedy Town, Hong Kong
- Kennedy Town station, a Mass Transit Railway terminus in Kennedy Town, Hong Kong

=== Colombia ===
- Kennedy, Bogotá, Colombia

=== Lebanon ===
- Rue John Kennedy, a street in Beirut, Lebanon

=== Luxembourg ===
- Avenue John F. Kennedy

=== Solomon Islands ===
- Kennedy Island, Solomon Islands

=== United States ===
- Kennedy, Alabama
- Kennedy, California
- Kennedy, Illinois
- Kennedy, Minnesota
- Kennedy, Missouri
- Kennedy, Nebraska
- Kennedy, New York
- John F. Kennedy International Airport, Queens, New York
- Kennedy, Wisconsin
- Kennedy Plaza, Providence, Rhode Island
- Kennedy Township, Allegheny County, Pennsylvania
- Kennedy Space Center, Cape Canaveral, Florida

=== Other places ===
- Kennedy Lake (disambiguation)
- Kennedy Road (disambiguation)
- List of peaks named Kennedy

== Film and television ==
- Kennedy (film), a 2023 Indian Hindi-language film
- Kennedy (talk show), an Irish television chat show
- Kennedy (1983 miniseries), a TV miniseries about the life of President Kennedy from 1961 to 1963
- Kennedy (2023 miniseries), an American television documentary miniseries
- The Kennedys (miniseries), a TV miniseries chronicling the lives of the Kennedy family
- The Kennedys (TV series), a British sitcom
- Kennedy (upcoming TV series), American biographical series

== Organizations ==
- Kathryn Kennedy Winery, a winery in California, US
- Kennedy Mall, in Dubuque, Iowa, US
- Kennedy Mine, in Jackson, California, US
- Kennedy's, a defunct department store in the US
- Kennedy Company, a defunct computer storage company in the US
- Kennedy Middle School (disambiguation)

== Court cases ==
- Kennedy v. Mendoza-Martinez, a 1963 U.S. Supreme Court case
- Kennedy v. Louisiana, a 2008 U.S. Supreme Court case
- Kennedy v. Bremerton School District, a 2022 U.S. Supreme Court case

== Other uses ==
- Kennedy's disease, neuromuscular disease
- Kennedy Doctrine, U.S. policy towards Latin America in the early 1960s
- Kennedy march, a 50-mile-walk completed within 20 hours
- Kennedy Round, international trade negotiations held during the mid-1960s
- USS Kennedy, any of several U.S. naval vessels
- Kennedy brothers uprising, an insurrection in Argentina
- Kennedy (horse)

== See also ==
- John F. Kennedy High School (disambiguation)
- Justice Kennedy (disambiguation)
- Kenedy (disambiguation)
- Harrison H. Kennedy Award, an American high school sports award
- Kennedy Award (journalism), an Australian award for journalism
