= Kennedy Road (Toronto) =

Major north–south route in the Greater Toronto Area of Ontario

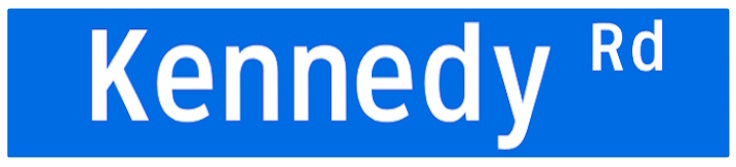
- York Regional Road 3
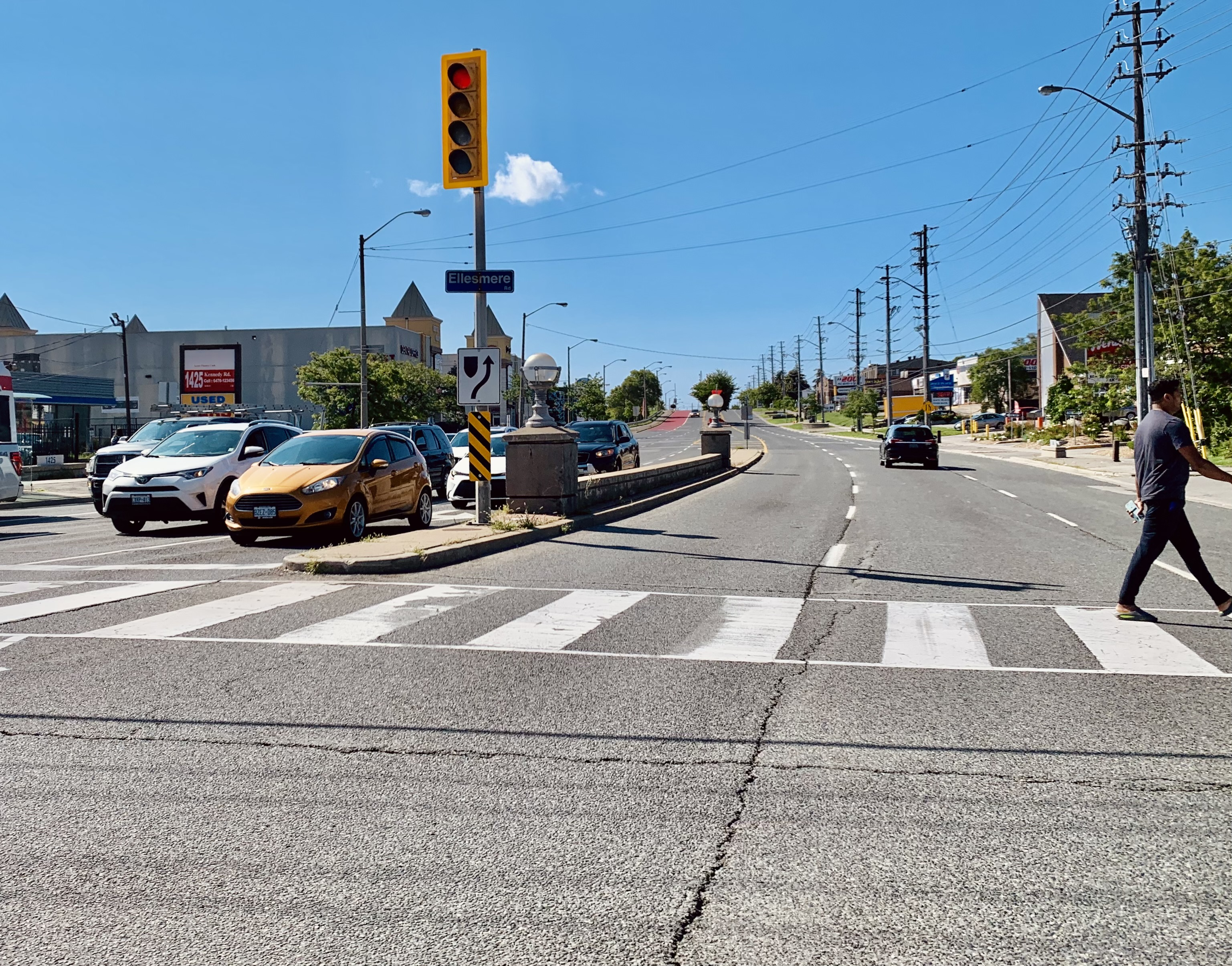
- Kennedy Road looking south from Ellesmere Road

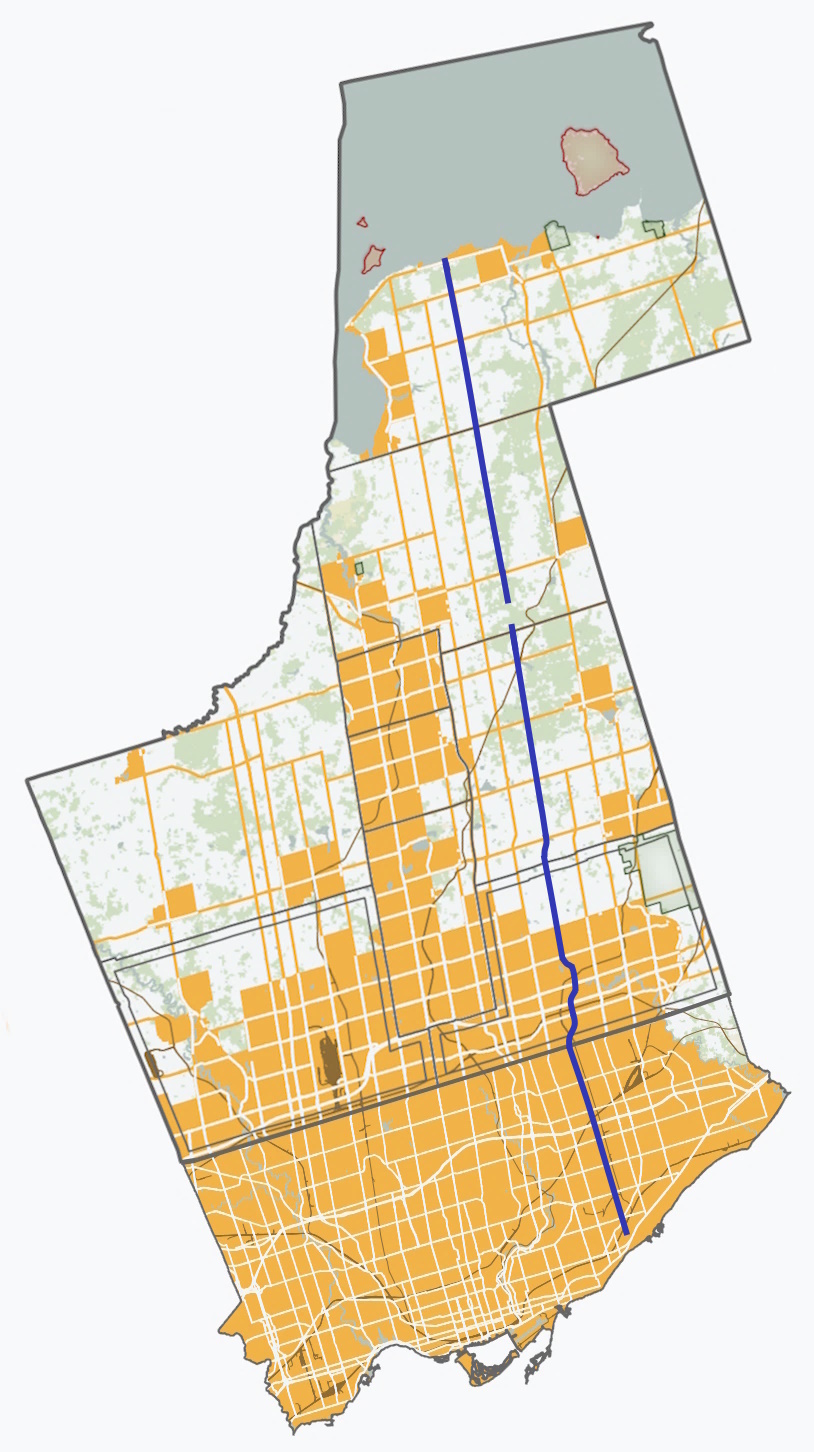
- Route of Kennedy Road through Toronto and York Region (blue line)
- Namesake: Thomas Laird Kennedy & Family
- Maintained by: City of Toronto; Region of York
- Length: 68.3 km (42.4 mi) (southern section: 43.8 km (27.2 mi)) (northern section: 24.5 km (15.2 mi))
- Location: Toronto; Markham; East Gwillimbury; Georgina
- South end: Highview Avenue in Toronto
- Major junctions: Danforth Road; St Clair Avenue; Eglinton Avenue; Lawrence Avenue; Ellesmere Road; Highway 401; Sheppard Avenue; Finch Avenue; Steeles Avenue; Highway 407; Highway 7 Major Mackenzie Drive; Elgin Mills Road; Stouffville Road; Bloomington Road; Aurora Road; St. John’s Sideroad; Vivian Road; Davis Drive —Road breaks— Mount Albert Road; Queensville Sideroad; Ravenshoe Road; Metro Road
- North end: Lake Drive in Georgina

Other
Nearby arterial roads
← Birchmount Road; Warden Avenue	Midland Avenue; McCowan Road →

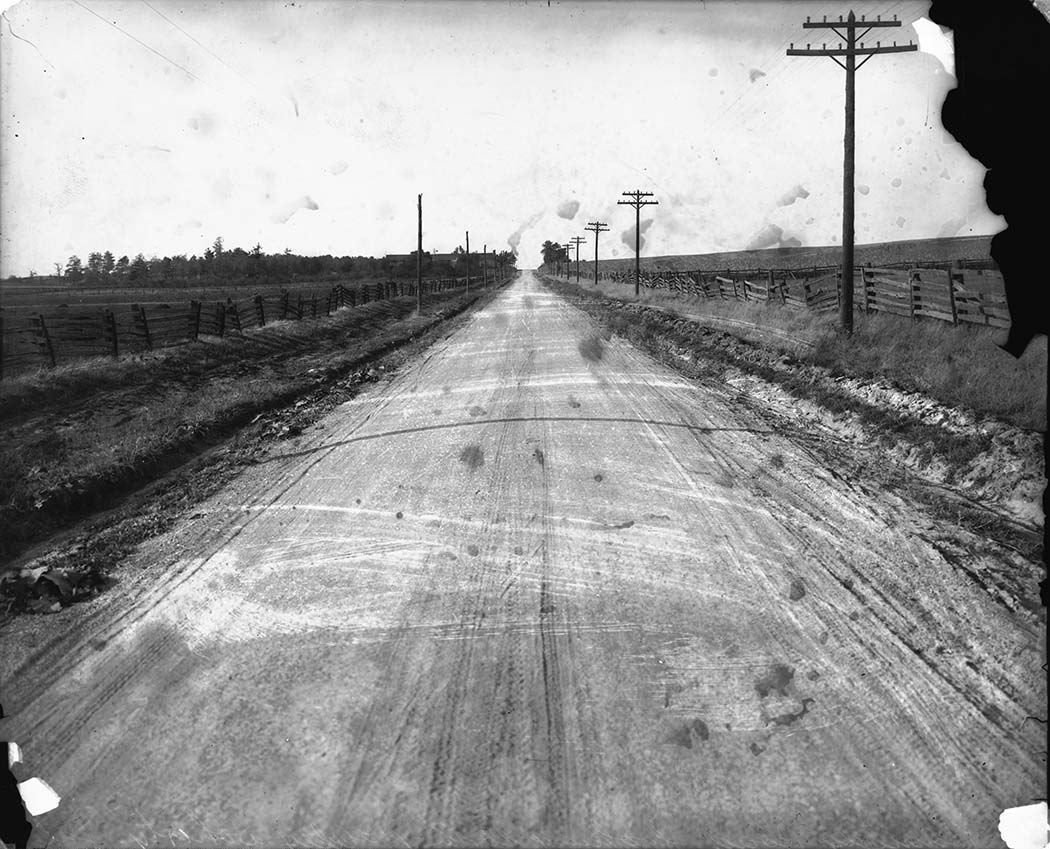
Kennedy Road, south of Ellesmere Road, circa 1925

Kennedy Road is a major north–south arterial road in Toronto and York Region, Ontario, Canada. It has a main southern section running 43.8 km north from Highview Avenue in Toronto to Davis Drive at the boundary of Whitchurch-Stouffville and East Gwillimbury in York, and a 24.5 km northern section from Harold Road to Lake Simcoe in Georgina.

Kennedy Road is a rare example of two major streets in the Greater Toronto Area to share names: the other Kennedy Road being located in Peel Region. In York Region, former parts of Kennedy Road include Old Kennedy Road and Main Street Unionville. Kennedy Road is broken between Davis Drive and Herald Road, due to the Bendor and Graves Tract, a planted forest managed by York Regional Forests.

It is home to the business district of Scarborough district because of the long suburban retail strip along it between Lawrence Avenue East to just north of Sheppard Avenue East. The Toronto section of the road is otherwise mainly residential with high rise apartment buildings. North of Steeles Avenue East, it enters York Region and is designated and signed as York Regional Road 3, and traverses Markham, Whitchurch-Stouffville, East Gwillimbury, and Georgina, where it terminates at Lake Simcoe. Kennedy Road is named for the Kennedy family, one of the many early farming settlers in the 18th and 19th centuries to which Thomas Laird Kennedy belonged. It is likely linked to Private John Kennedy of the 3rd Regiment of the York Militia (now The Queen's York Rangers (1st American Regiment) (RCAC)) who was granted 100 acres (0.40 km^{2}) of land near Kennedy Road and Ellesmere Road.

Kennedy Road resumes north of Herald Road, ending at Lake Drive on the shore of Lake Simcoe.

In the 1990s, Kennedy Road was realigned at Steeles Avenue to connect the broken section, and was realigned east 300 m between Highway 407 and 16th Avenue. From Steeles Avenue, it is a four-lane road northward to Major Mackenzie Drive East, and a two-lane road from Major Mackenzie Drive to Lake Simcoe.

There are low-density residential and commercial buildings from Steeles Avenue to Major Mackenzie Drive and from Mahoney Avenue to Lake Drive East. Future high density residential and commercial development is beginning to go up in Downtown Markham, as Kennedy forms its eastern boundary. Farmland and forests can be found between Mahoney Avenue and Major Mackenzie Drive.

Kennedy Road between Enterprise Boulevard and YMCA Boulevard in Markham is notable as forming part of the Markham Street Circuit, an auto racing street circuit first used on the weekend of August 15–16, 2026, for the inaugural races of the NASCAR Canada Series Markham 125 and the IndyCar Series Ontario Honda Dealers Indy Markham.

== Commerce ==
The Kennedy Road Business Improvement Association (BIA) represents more than 300 businesses located on the road between Lawrence Avenue East and Kennedy Commons at Highway 401.

== Largest neighbourhoods ==
- Dorset Park
- Milliken
- Agincourt
- Kennedy Park
- L'Amoreaux
- Steeles

== Attractions ==
- Kennedy Commons Mall
- Agincourt Mall
- White Shield Plaza
- Tam O'Shanter Golf Course
- Kennedy station
- Pacific Mall
- Market Village Shopping Centre
- Angus Glen Golf Club
- Mandarin Golf and Country Club
- Pheasant Run Golf Club
- Willow Beach
- Lake Simcoe
- Kennedy Business District

== Public transit ==
In Toronto, service on Kennedy Road north of Eglinton Avenue is provided by the 43 Kennedy route. South of Eglinton, routes 113 Danforth (to Danforth Road) and 20 Cliffside (from Park Street to Highview Avenue) travel on Kennedy.

In York Region, Kennedy Road is served mainly by YRT Route 8. Other routes using portions of Kennedy Road are YRT Routes 2 (Milliken, at Milliken GO Train arrival times), 18 (Bur Oak), and 522 (Markham Community Bus).

The Viva Purple and Viva Green lines pass through Kennedy Vivastation at Highway 7.

== In popular culture ==
- The song "Keep the Family Close" by Drake from Views references the road: "Kennedy Road taught me not to trust people like you".

== See also ==
- List of York Regional Roads
- Kennedy Road in Brampton and in Mississauga
