= Solo de Guitarra, Volumen No. 3 =

Studio album by Atahualpa Yupanqui
- Released: 1956
- Genre: Argentine folk
- Label: Odeon

Solo de Guitarra, Volumen No. 3 is an album by Argentine singer and guitarist Atahualpa Yupanqui. It was released in 1956 on the Odeon label.

== Track listing ==
Side A

1. "Canción del Carretero" (Gustavo Caraballo, Carlos López Buchardo)
2. "El Aromo" (Romildo Risso - Atahualpa Yupanqui)
3. "Zamba de mi Pago" (Hermanos Ábalos)
4. "La Montaraza" (Atahualpa Yupanqui, Pablo del Cerro)

Side B

1. "Huella, Huellita" (Atahualpa Yupanqui)
2. "La Zamba Soñadora" (Pablo del Cerro)
3. "Leña Verde" (Atahualpa Yupanqui)
4. "El Tulumbano" (Pablo del Cerro)
