= Canto y Guitarra, Volumen No. 5 =

Studio album by Atahualpa Yupanqui
- Released: 1958
- Genre: Argentine folk
- Label: Odeon

Canto y Guitarra, Volumen No. 5 is an album by Argentine singer and guitarist Atahualpa Yupanqui. It was released in 1958 on the Odeon label.

== Track listing ==
Side A

1. "1.Kaluyo de Huáscar" (Atahualpa Yupanqui)
2. "La estancia vieja" (Atahualpa Yupanqui)
3. "La colorada" (Atahualpa Yupanqui)
4. "A qué le llaman distancia" (Atahualpa Yupanqui)

Side B

1. "Zambita del buen amor" (Atahualpa Yupanqui, Pablo del Cerro)
2. "La humilde" (Julián Díaz)
3. Canción de los horneros" (Romildo Risso, Atahualpa Yupanqui)
4. "Lloran las ramas del viento" (Atahualpa Yupanqui)
