= The Kennedys =

The Kennedys may refer to:

- The Kennedy family, an American political family
- The Kennedys (museum), a German museum about the Kennedy family
- The Kennedys (band), an American folk rock band
- The Kennedys (miniseries), a 2011 Canadian miniseries about the Kennedy family
- The Kennedys (TV series), a 2015 British sitcom
- The Kennedys: Dynasty and Disaster, a 1984 non-fiction book by John H. Davis

== See also ==
- Kennedy (disambiguation)
