= Selva, Pampa y Cerro =

Selva, Pama y Cerro

Studio album by Atahualpa Yupanqui
- Released: 1964
- Genre: Argentine folk
- Label: Odeon

Selva, Pama y Cerro is an album by Argentine singer and guitarist Atahualpa Yupanqui. It was released in 1964 on the Odeon label. It was the No. 1 album in Argentina in 1964.

== Track listing ==
Side A

1. "Zamba de Vergas" (traditional)
2. "La Alabanza" (Atahualpa Yupanqui - Hermanos Díaz)
3. "Los Dos Abuelos" (Atahualpa Yupanqui - Pablo del Cerro)
4. "Canción para Doña Guillermina" (Atahualpa Yupanqui)
5. "La Vengo a Dejar" (Atahualpa Yupanqui)
6. "Zamba del Pajuerano" (Atahualpa Yupanqui, Pablo del Cerro)

Side B

1. "Los Yuyitos de Mi Tierra" (Romildo Risso, Atahualpa Yupanqui)
2. "Duerme Negrito" (traditional)
3. "Payo Sola" Atahualpa Yupanqui - Pablo del Cerro)
4. "Sin Caballo y en Montiel" (Atahualpa Yupanqui, Pablo del Cerro)
5. "La Tristecita" (Osvaldo Sosa Cordero, Ariel Ramírez)
6. "El Niño Duerme Sonriendo" (Manuel Benítez Carrasco, Atahualpa Yupanqui)
