= Solo de Guitarra, Volumen No. 6 =

Studio album by Atahualpa Yupanqui
- Released: 1958
- Genre: Argentine folk
- Label: Odeon

Solo de Guitarra, Volumen No. 6 is an album by Argentine singer and guitarist Atahualpa Yupanqui. It was released in 1958 on the Odeon label. It was the No. 1 album in Argentina in 1958.

== Track listing ==
Side A

1. "Flor de Cerro" (Pablo del Cerro)
2. "La Olvidada" (Atahualpa Yupanqui, Hermanos Díaz)
3. "El Pocas Pulgas" (Atahualpa Yupanqui)
4. "Oración a Pérez Cardozo" (Atahualpa Yupanqui)
5. "!Viejo Tambor Vidalero!" (Atahualpa Yupanqui)
6. "Vidala" (Gustavo Caraballo - Alberto Lopez Buchardo)

Side B

1. "Zamba del Pañuelo" (Manuel José Castilla, Gustavo Leguizamón)
2. "Romance de la Vidala" (Atahualpa Yupanqui)
3. "Estrellita" (Manuel María Ponce)
4. "La Vuelta al Pago" (Atahualpa Yupanqui, Pablo del Cerro)
5. "Canción del Abuelo" (Atahualpa Yupanqui)
6. "Luna Tucumana" (Atahualpa Yupanqui)
