= Canción para Pablo Neruda =

Studio album by Atahualpa Yupanqui
- Released: 1975
- Genre: Argentine folk
- Label: Le Chant du Monde

Canción para Pablo Neruda is an album by Argentine singer and guitarist Atahualpa Yupanqui. It was released in 1975 on the Le Chant du Monde label.

== Track listing ==
Side A

1. "Cancion para Pablo Neruda" (Atahualpa Yupanqui) [4:00]
2. "Milonga Triste" (Sebastian Piana, Homeno Manzi) [3:00]
3. "Baguala del Gaucho Pobre" (A. Yupanqui) [3:45]
4. "Juan Careno" (A. Yupanqui) [2:10]
5. "Milonga del Solitario" (A. Yupanqui) [3:40]

Side B

1. "Nada Mas" (A. Yupanqui, Pablo del Cerro) [3:15]
2. "Dos Milongas Urguayas: 1. Silbando piensan las aves, 2. Humito de mi cigarro" (A. Yupanqui, R. Risso) [4:08]
3. "La Paulita" (Pablo del Cerro) [2:10]
4. "Cancion Del Arriero de Llamas" (A. Yupanqui) [3:05]
5. "Recuerdos de el Portezuelo" (A. Yupanqui) [4:00]
