= Canto y Guitarra, Volumen 4 =

Canto y Guitarra, Volumen No. 4

Studio album by Atahualpa Yupanqui
- Released: 1957
- Genre: Argentine folk
- Label: Odeon

Canto y Guitarra, Volumen No. 4 is an album by Argentine singer and guitarist Atahualpa Yupanqui. It was released in 1957 on the Odeon label.

== Track listing ==
Side A

1. "Chacarera del pantano" (Atahualpa Yupanqui, Pablo del Cerro)
2. "El paisano errant"e (Atahualpa Yupanqui)
3. "El coyita (Pablo del Cerro)
4. "Burruyacu (Atahualpa Yupanqui, Pablo del Cerro)

Side B

1. "El llanto" (Andrés Chazarreta)
2. "Le tengo rabia al silencio" (Atahualpa Yupanqui)
3. "Vidala" (traditional)
4. "Campo abierto" (Atahualpa Yupanqui)
