= Arenita del Camino, Volumen No. 9 =

Studio album by Atahualpa Yupanqui
- Released: 1961
- Genre: Argentine folk
- Label: Odeon

Arenita del Camino, Volumen No. 9 (translated, "sandy road") is an album by Argentine singer and guitarist Atahualpa Yupanqui. It was released in 1961 on the Odeon label.

== Track listing ==
Side A

1. "Zamba del grillo" (Atahualpa Yupanqui)
2. "La colorada" (Atahualpa Yupanqui)
3. "El paisano errante" (Atahualpa Yupanqui)
4. "El alazán" (Atahualpa Yupanqui - Pablo del Cerro) *Versión ODEÓN 51622
5. "Lloran las ramas del viento" (Atahualpa Yupanqui) *Versión ODEÓN 51722
6. "Huella, huellita" (Atahualpa Yupanqui)

Side B

1. Minero soy" (Atahualpa Yupanqui)
2. "Zambita del buen amor" (Atahualpa Yupanqui, Pablo del Cerro)
3. "Cruz del sur" (Atahualpa Yupanqui)
4. "Canción de los horneros" (Romildo Risso, Atahualpa Yupanqui)
5. "La humilde" (Julián Díaz)
6. "Arenitas del camino" (Atahualpa Yupanqui)
