= ¡Soy Libre! ¡Soy Bueno! =

Studio album by Atahualpa Yupanqui
- Released: 1968
- Genre: Argentine folk
- Label: Le Chant du Monde

¡Soy Libre! ¡Soy Bueno! is an album by Argentine singer and guitarist Atahualpa Yupanqui. It was released in 1968 on the Le Chant du Monde label.

== Track listing ==
Side A

1. "Trabajo, Quiero Trabajo" (translated, "Work, I Want Work") (Atahualpa Yupanqui) [2:55]
2. "Lloran Las Ramas del Viento" (translated, "the branches of the wind cry") (Atahualpa Yupanqui) [2:35]
3. "Le Tengo Rabia al Silencio" (translated, "I am angry at the silence") (Atahualpa Yupanqui) [3:44]
4. "La Copla" (Atahualpa Yupanqui, Pablo del Cerro) [3:44]
5. "Triste Número 5" (Julián Aguirre) [3:03]

Side B

1. "Soy Libre" (translated, "I am free") (traditional) [3:52]
2. "Danza de la Paloma Enamorada" (translated, "Dance of the dove in love") (Atahualpa Yupanqui) [2:25]
3. "El Poeta" (Atahualpa Yupanqui) [2:15]
4. "El Pintor" (Atahualpa Yupanqui) [2:03]
5. "La Olvidada" (translated, "The forgotten") (Atahualpa Yupanqui, Hermanos Díaz) [2:20]
6. "Danza Del Maíz Maduro" (translated, "Dance of ripe corn") (Atahualpa Yupanqui) [4:20]
