= 2026 Ontario Honda Dealers Indy Markham =

IndyCar race held in Markham, Ontario, Canada

(Canada) 2026 Ontario Honda Dealers Indy Markham
Race details
14th round of the 2026 IndyCar season
← Previous race	Next race →
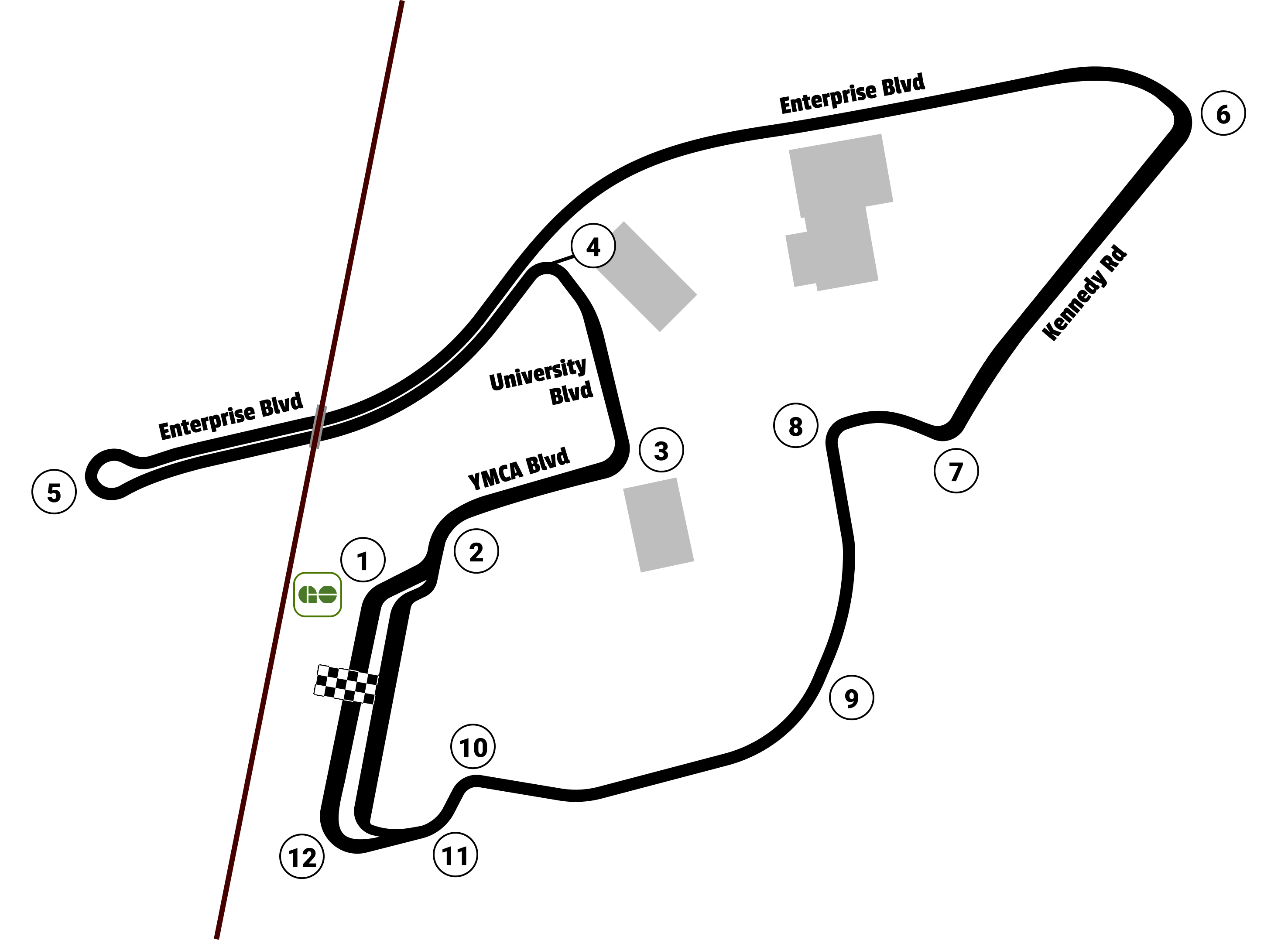
- Layout of the Markham Street Circuit
- Date: August 16, 2026
- Official name: Ontario Honda Dealers Indy Markham
- Location: Markham Street Circuit, Markham, Ontario, Canada
- Course: Temporary street circuit 2.19 mi / 3.52 km
- Distance: 90 laps 197.1 mi / 317.2 km

Pole position
- Driver: (United Kingdom) Louis Foster (Rahal Letterman Lanigan Racing)
- Time: 1:13.2383

Fastest lap
- Driver: (Sweden) Marcus Ericsson (Andretti Global)
- Time: 1:14.2690 (on lap 68 of 90)

Podium
- First: (Sweden) Marcus Ericsson (Andretti Global)
- Second: (France) Romain Grosjean (Dale Coyne Racing)
- Third: (Australia) Will Power (Andretti Global)

Chronology
Previous	Next
none	2027

The 2026 Ontario Honda Dealers Indy Markham was the fourteenth round of the 2026 IndyCar season. The race was held on August 16, 2026, in Markham, Ontario, Canada at the Markham Street Circuit near Markham Centre. The race was contested over 90 laps.

Marcus Ericsson won the race, Romain Grosjean finished 2nd, and Will Power finished 3rd. Álex Palou and Pato O'Ward rounded out the top five, while Christian Lundgaard, Rinus VeeKay, Scott McLaughlin, Graham Rahal, and Santino Ferrucci rounded out the top ten.

== Background ==
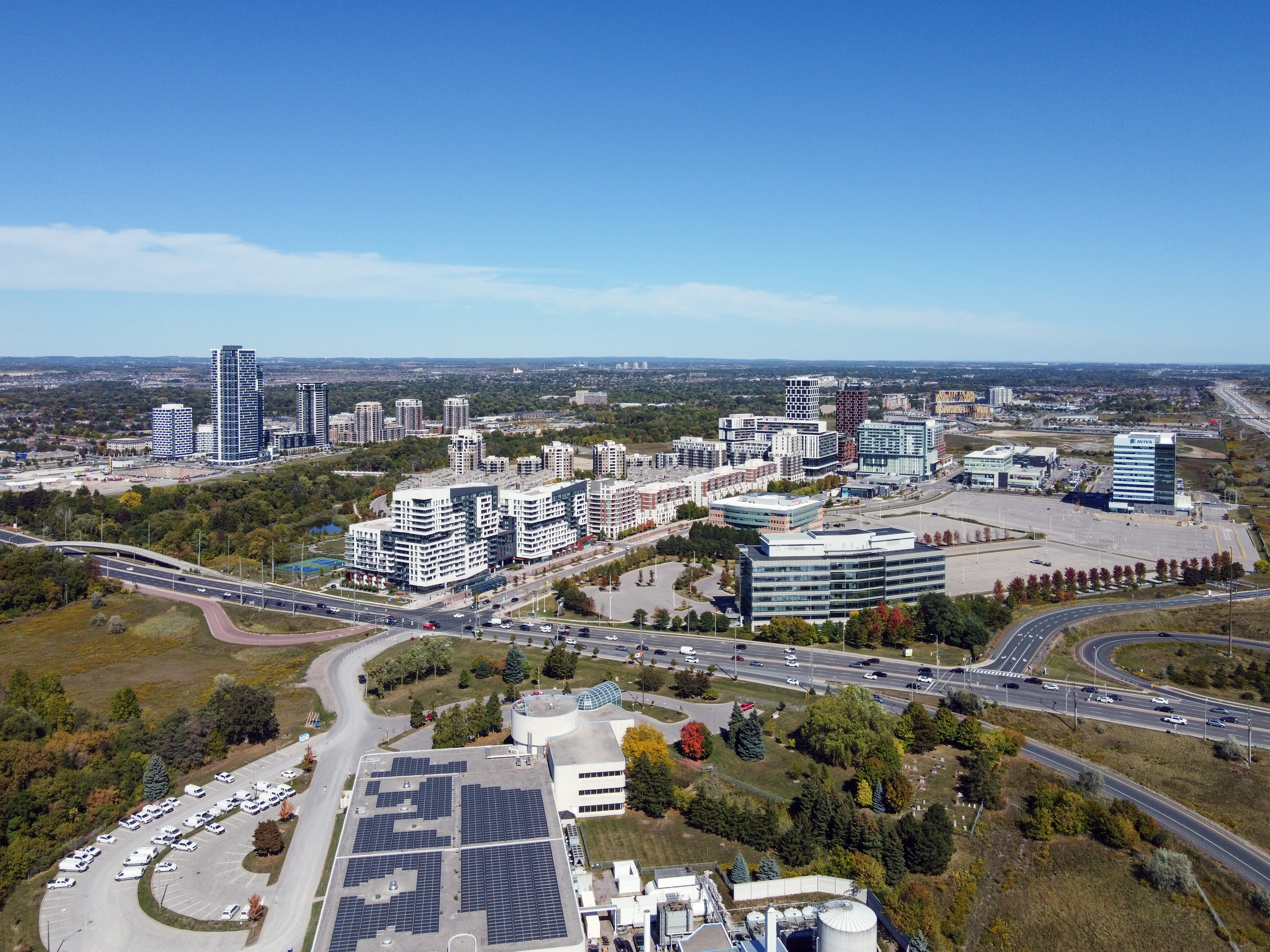
Downtown Markham (pictured in 2025), the area where the race will be held.

The Ontario Honda Dealers Indy Markham, is held at the Markham Street Circuit at Markham Centre, in Markham, Ontario, Canada on its 12-turn street course layout. As a 2.19-mile (3.52 km) track, it is also currently a points-paying race of the NTT IndyCar Series. The event is contested by "Indy Car", that is a formula of professional-level, single-seat, open cockpit, open-wheel, purpose-built race cars.

Prior to 2026, IndyCar and CART/Champ Car had continuously staged a street course race at Exhibition Place in downtown Toronto since 1986 (excluding 2008 due to the cancellation of the 2008 Champ Car World Series, and the COVID-19 pandemic-affected 2020 and 2021 seasons). With BMO Field – a stadium within the confines of the Exhibition Place circuit – hosting matches of the 2026 FIFA World Cup and therefore preventing the construction of the track, the event was moved to Markham within the Greater Toronto Area on a five-year deal.

=== Standings before the race ===
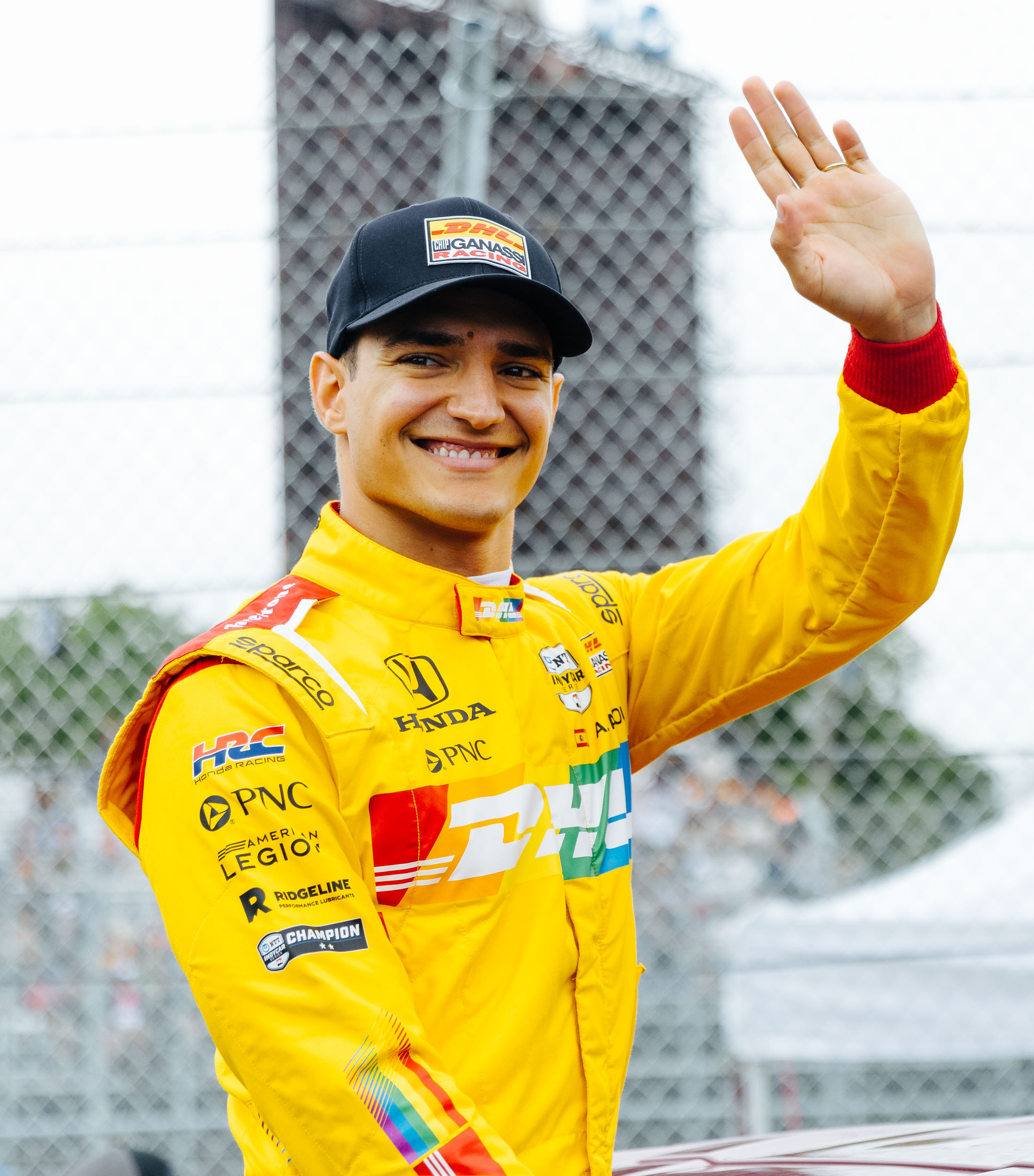
Álex Palou (pictured in 2024), the championship leader before the race.

Heading into the event, Chip Ganassi Racing driver Álex Palou led the Drivers' Championship with 510 points, 110 more than Andretti Global driver Kyle Kirkwood, who was second. Team Penske driver David Malukas is third with 392 points, and Christian Lundgaard and his Arrow McLaren teammate Pato O'Ward are fourth and fifth in points. In the Engine Manufacturer Championship, Honda led with 1129 points, while Chevrolet had 996 points.

== Entry list ==
Key	Meaning
R	Rookie
W	Past winner

No.	Driver	Team	Engine
2	(United States) Josef Newgarden	Team Penske	Chevrolet
3	(New Zealand) Scott McLaughlin	Team Penske	Chevrolet
4	(Brazil) Caio Collet R	A.J. Foyt Racing	Chevrolet
5	(Mexico) Pato O'Ward	Arrow McLaren	Chevrolet
6	(United States) Nolan Siegel	Arrow McLaren	Chevrolet
7	(Denmark) Christian Lundgaard	Arrow McLaren	Chevrolet
8	(Cayman Islands) Kyffin Simpson	Chip Ganassi Racing	Honda
9	(New Zealand) Scott Dixon	Chip Ganassi Racing	Honda
10	(Spain) Álex Palou	Chip Ganassi Racing	Honda
12	(United States) David Malukas	Team Penske	Chevrolet
14	(United States) Santino Ferrucci	A. J. Foyt Racing	Chevrolet
15	(United States) Graham Rahal	Rahal Letterman Lanigan Racing	Honda
18	(France) Romain Grosjean	Dale Coyne Racing	Honda
19	(Norway) Dennis Hauger R	Dale Coyne Racing	Honda
20	(United States) Alexander Rossi	ECR	Chevrolet
21	(Denmark) Christian Rasmussen	ECR	Chevrolet
26	(Australia) Will Power	Andretti Global	Honda
27	(United States) Kyle Kirkwood	Andretti Global with Curb-Agajanian	Honda
28	(Sweden) Marcus Ericsson	Andretti Global	Honda
45	(United Kingdom) Louis Foster	Rahal Letterman Lanigan Racing	Honda
47	(Germany) Mick Schumacher R	Rahal Letterman Lanigan Racing	Honda
60	(Sweden) Felix Rosenqvist	Meyer Shank Racing with Curb-Agajanian	Honda
66	(New Zealand) Marcus Armstrong	Meyer Shank Racing with Curb-Agajanian	Honda
76	(Netherlands) Rinus VeeKay	Juncos Hollinger Racing	Chevrolet
77	(United States) Sting Ray Robb	Juncos Hollinger Racing	Chevrolet

== Practice ==
=== Practice 1 ===
The first practice session was scheduled to be held Friday, August 14, at 3:00 p.m. ET; however, it was delayed due to the track not being ready. IndyCar moved the session to 6:00 p.m. ET, but due to the track still not being finished, the session was held on Saturday, August 15, at 10:05 a.m. ET.

Top Practice Speeds
Pos	No.	Driver	Team	Engine	Lap Time
1	10	(Spain) Álex Palou	Chip Ganassi Racing	Honda	1:14.9915
2	4	(Brazil) Caio Collet R	A. J. Foyt Racing	Chevrolet	1:15.0454
3	45	(United Kingdom) Louis Foster	Rahal Letterman Lanigan Racing	Honda	1:15.0728
Practice 1 results

=== Practice 2 ===
The second practice session was originally scheduled to be held on Saturday, August 15, at 10:00 a.m. ET, but due to a schedule change from the previous night, the session was held at 2:30 PM ET.

Top Practice Speeds
Pos	No.	Driver	Team	Engine	Lap Time
1	45	(United Kingdom) Louis Foster	Rahal Letterman Lanigan Racing	Honda	1:14.1793
2	28	(Sweden) Marcus Ericsson	Andretti Global	Honda	1:14.1933
3	12	(United States) David Malukas	Team Penske	Chevrolet	1:14.1940
Practice 2 results

== Qualifying ==
Qualifying was originally scheduled to be held on Saturday, August 15, at 2:25 PM ET, but due to a schedule change from the previous night, the session was held at 6:30 PM ET.

=== Qualifying classification ===
Pos	No.	Driver	Team	Engine	Time	Final grid
1	45	(United Kingdom) Louis Foster	Rahal Letterman Lanigan Racing	Honda	1:13.2383	1
2	7	(Denmark) Christian Lundgaard	Arrow McLaren	Chevrolet	1:13.6352	2
3	3	(New Zealand) Scott McLaughlin	Team Penske	Chevrolet	1:13.6804	3
4	28	(Sweden) Marcus Ericsson	Andretti Global	Honda	1:13.8383	4
5	19	(Norway) Dennis Hauger R	Dale Coyne Racing	Honda	1:13.9403	5
6	76	(Netherlands) Rinus VeeKay	Juncos Hollinger Racing	Chevrolet	1:14.0601	6
7	12	(United States) David Malukas	Team Penske	Chevrolet	1:14.4923	7
8	20	(United States) Alexander Rossi	ECR	Chevrolet	1:14.5315	14
9	9	(New Zealand) Scott Dixon	Chip Ganassi Racing	Honda	1:14.5824	8
10	15	(United States) Graham Rahal	Rahal Letterman Lanigan Racing	Honda	1:14.6654	9
11	47	(Germany) Mick Schumacher R	Rahal Letterman Lanigan Racing	Honda	1:14.7101	10
12	10	(Spain) Álex Palou	Chip Ganassi Racing	Honda	1:17.4292	11
13	8	(Cayman Islands) Kyffin Simpson	Chip Ganassi Racing	Honda	1:14.5349	12
14	18	(France) Romain Grosjean	Dale Coyne Racing	Honda	1:14.2574	13
15	21	(Denmark) Christian Rasmussen	ECR	Chevrolet	1:14.7008	21
16	27	(United States) Kyle Kirkwood	Andretti Global	Honda	1:14.3654	22
17	77	(United States) Sting Ray Robb	Juncos Hollinger Racing	Chevrolet	1:14.8410	15
18	60	(Sweden) Felix Rosenqvist	Meyer Shank Racing	Honda	1:14.3722	16
19	6	(United States) Nolan Siegel	Arrow McLaren	Chevrolet	1:15.1875	17
20	5	(Mexico) Pato O'Ward	Arrow McLaren	Chevrolet	1:14.3822	23
21	14	(United States) Santino Ferrucci	A. J. Foyt Racing	Chevrolet	1:15.6148	18
22	66	(New Zealand) Marcus Armstrong	Meyer Shank Racing with Curb Agajanian	Honda	1:14.4494	24
23	4	(Brazil) Caio Collet R	A.J. Foyt Racing	Chevrolet	1:27.9141	19
24	26	(Australia) Will Power	Andretti Global	Honda	1:20.5647	25
25	2	(United States) Josef Newgarden	Team Penske	Chevrolet	1:21.0448	20
Full qualifying results

== Warmup ==
The warmup session was held on Sunday, August 16, at 8:30 a.m. ET.

Top Practice Speeds
Pos	No.	Driver	Team	Engine	Lap Time
1	7	(Denmark) Christian Lundgaard	Arrow McLaren	Chevrolet	1:14.4411
2	76	(Netherlands) Rinus VeeKay	Juncos Hollinger Racing	Chevrolet	1:14.7276
3	45	(United Kingdom) Louis Foster	Rahal Letterman Lanigan Racing	Honda	1:14.8141
Warmup Results

== Race ==
The race was held on Sunday August 16, at 12:00 PM ET.

=== Race classification ===
Pos	No.	Driver	Team	Engine	Laps	Time/Retired	Pit Stops	Grid	Laps Led	Pts.
1	28	(Sweden) Marcus Ericsson	Andretti Global	Honda	90	2:16:22.2341	2	4	21	51
2	18	(France) Romain Grosjean	Dale Coyne Racing	Honda	90	+7.5305	2	13	28	41
3	26	(Australia) Will Power	Andretti Global	Honda	90	+10.5582	2	25	1	36
4	10	(Spain) Álex Palou	Chip Ganassi Racing	Honda	90	+10.7451	2	11		32
5	5	(Mexico) Pato O'Ward	Arrow McLaren	Chevrolet	90	+11.1658	3	23		30
6	7	(Denmark) Christian Lundgaard	Arrow McLaren	Chevrolet	90	+21.7843	3	2		28
7	76	(Netherlands) Rinus VeeKay	Juncos Hollinger Racing	Chevrolet	90	+22.1701	3	6		26
8	3	(New Zealand) Scott McLaughlin	Team Penske	Chevrolet	90	+25.4428	2	3		24
9	15	(United States) Graham Rahal	Rahal Letterman Lanigan Racing	Honda	90	+26.0069	5	9		22
10	14	(United States) Santino Ferrucci	A.J. Foyt Enterprises	Chevrolet	90	+26.9249	3	18		20
11	77	(United States) Sting Ray Robb	Juncos Hollinger Racing	Chevrolet	90	+39.5356	3	15		19
12	6	(United States) Nolan Siegel	Arrow McLaren	Chevrolet	90	+40.1841	3	17	8	19
13	2	(United States) Josef Newgarden	Team Penske	Chevrolet	90	+41.2805	4	20		17
14	8	(Cayman Islands) Kyffin Simpson	Chip Ganassi Racing	Honda	90	+1:08.7169	3	12		16
15	19	(Norway) Dennis Hauger R	Dale Coyne Racing	Honda	89	Off Course	2	5		15
16	66	(New Zealand) Marcus Armstrong	Meyer Shank Racing with Curb-Agajanian	Honda	89	+1 Lap	6	24		14
17	12	(United States) David Malukas	Team Penske	Chevrolet	89	+1 Lap	4	7		13
18	9	(New Zealand) Scott Dixon	Chip Ganassi Racing	Honda	84	+6 Laps	4	8		12
19	4	(Brazil) Caio Collet R	A.J. Foyt Enterprises	Chevrolet	67	Retired	3	19		11
20	20	(United States) Alexander Rossi	ECR	Chevrolet	66	Mechanical	4	14		10
21	27	(United States) Kyle Kirkwood	Andretti Global	Honda	53	Contact	1	22		9
22	45	(United Kingdom) Louis Foster	Rahal Letterman Lanigan Racing	Honda	42	Contact	1	1	32	12
23	21	(Denmark) Christian Rasmussen	ECR	Chevrolet	35	Contact	2	21		7
24	60	(Sweden) Felix Rosenqvist	Meyer Shank Racing with Curb-Agajanian	Honda	18	Mechanical	2	16		6
25	47	(Germany) Mick Schumacher R	Rahal Letterman Lanigan Racing	Honda	14	Contact	0	10		5
Fastest lap: (Sweden) Marcus Ericsson (Andretti Global) – 1:14.2690(Lap 68)
Official Results

== Championship standings after the race ==
Drivers' Championship standings

	Pos.	Driver	Points
Unchanged	1	(Spain) Álex Palou	542
Unchanged	2	(United States) Kyle Kirkwood	409 (-133)
Unchanged	3	(United States) David Malukas	405 (-137)
Unchanged	4	(Denmark) Christian Lundgaard	403 (-139)
Unchanged	5	(Mexico) Pato O'Ward	385 (-157)

Engine manufacturer standings

	Pos.	Manufacturer	Points
Unchanged	1	Honda	1225
Unchanged	2	Chevrolet	1056 (–169)

- Note: Only the top five positions are included.

Previous race: 2026 OnlyBulls Grand Prix of Portland	IndyCar Series; 2026 season	Next race: Freedom 250 Grand Prix
Previous race: none	Grand Prix of Portland	Next race: 2027 Ontario Honda Dealers Indy Markham
