= Downtown Markham =

- Downtown
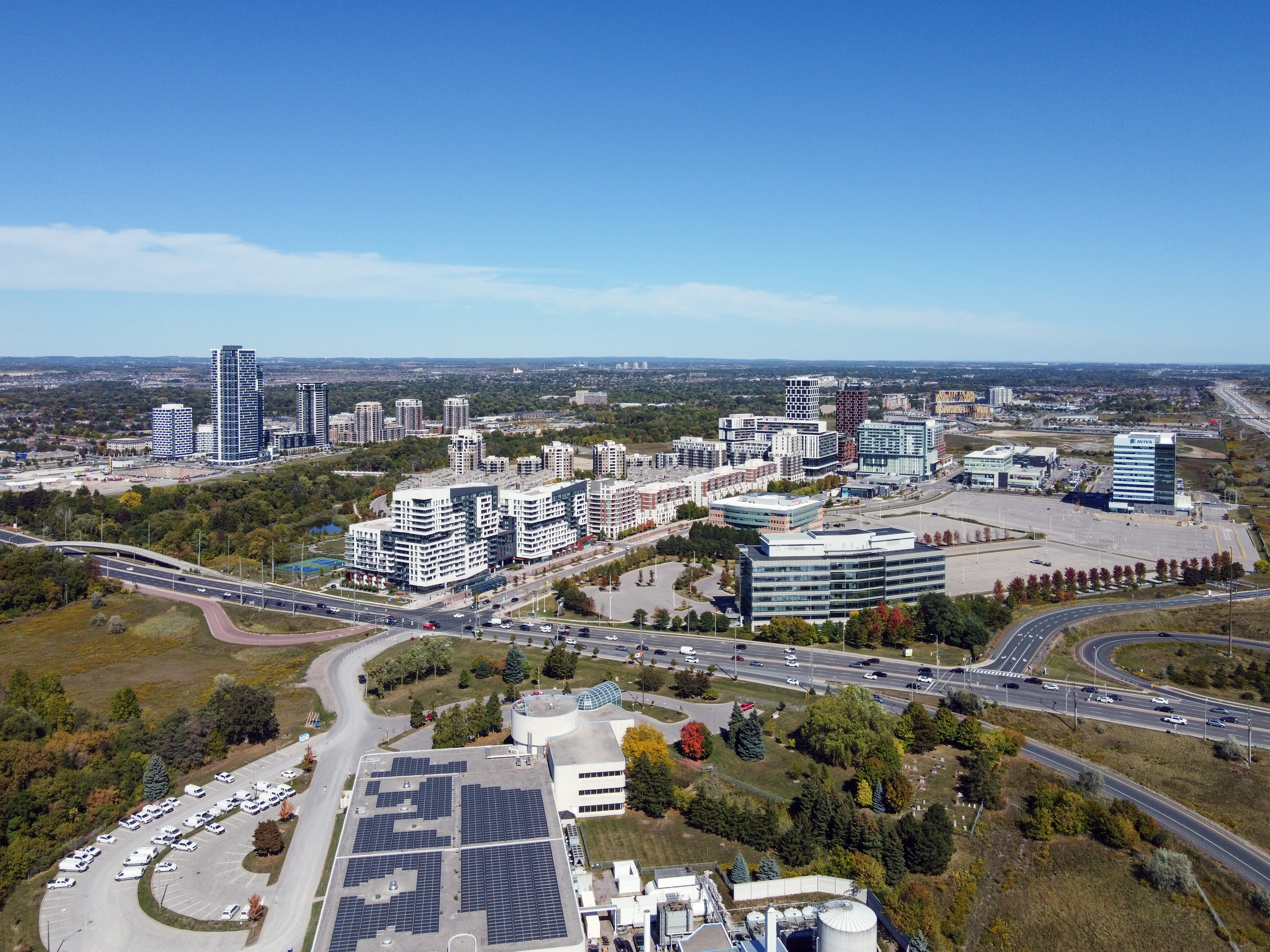
- Skyline of Downtown Markham in 2025
- Motto: the PLACE TO BE
- Downtown Markham within Markham
- Coordinates: 43°51′N 79°19′W
- Country: Canada
- Province: Ontario
- Regional Municipality: York
- City: Markham
- District: Markham Centre
- Established: 1992

Area
  - Total: 0.98 km^{2} (0.38 sq mi)

Population (2011)
  - Total: 3,452
- Based on data for census tract 5350401.18
- Postal code: L6G
- Website: Downtown Markham

Downtown Markham is the main downtown of Markham, Ontario, Canada. Currently under development, it is located near the historic Unionville district and serves as the new heart of Markham. Businesses in the district are expected to employ up to 65,000 individuals, and it may house as many as 140,000 residents. The development plans will have a high density of residential, retail, commercial and mixed-use structures. The Remington Group is the land developer for this project.

== Description ==
Downtown Markham is a planned urban hub and the largest planned mixed-use development in Canada. The development spans 243 acres and is situated in one of the fastest growing regions in the province. It will be the commercial and financial district at the center of the city of Markham, and will consist of a mix of residential, office and retail uses.

Two million square feet of retail space will include international retailers, local shops, restaurants and entertainment venues. Downtown Markham will also offer more than 3.4 million square feet of office space in a commercial district adjacent to Highway 407.

The urban centre is being designed and developed following sustainable guidelines, including energy efficient power sources and LEED (Leadership in Energy and Environmental Design) certified residential and commercial projects. Aside from allowing greater density, the development also enjoys 72 acres of natural and landscaped green space, improved walkability and easy access to public transit, including Viva Rapid Transit and GO Transit.

Downtown Markham refers to an area south of Uptown Markham / Highway 7, west of Kennedy Road / Main Street Unionville, east of Warden Avenue, and north of Highway 407 ETR.

On the other hand, Markham Centre or Unionville refers to a broader area. Markham Centre is bounded north to Apple Creek Boulevard / Carlton Road, east to Kennedy Road, west to Rodick Road, and south to 14th Avenue.

== History ==
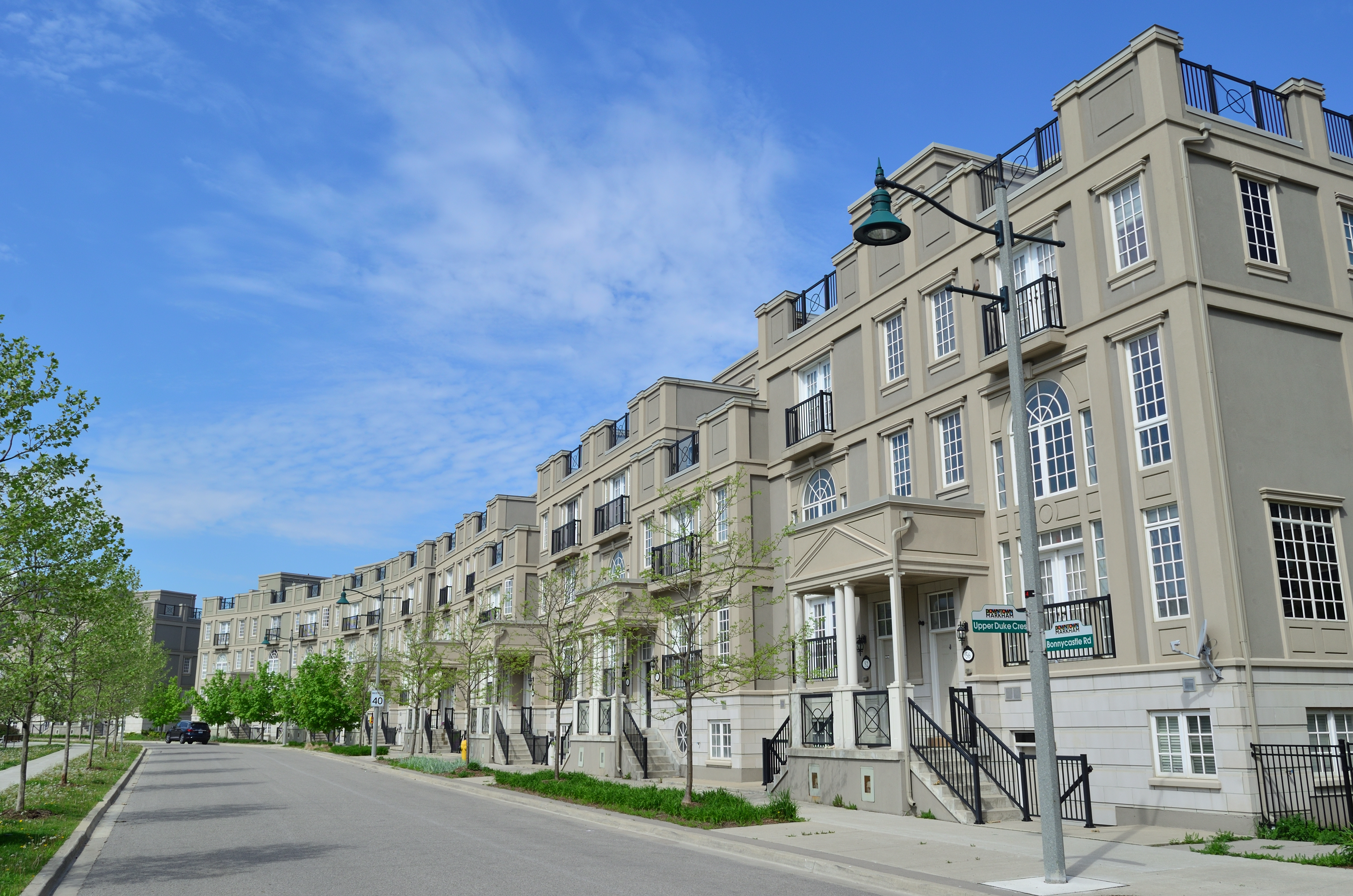
Townhouses in Downtown Markham

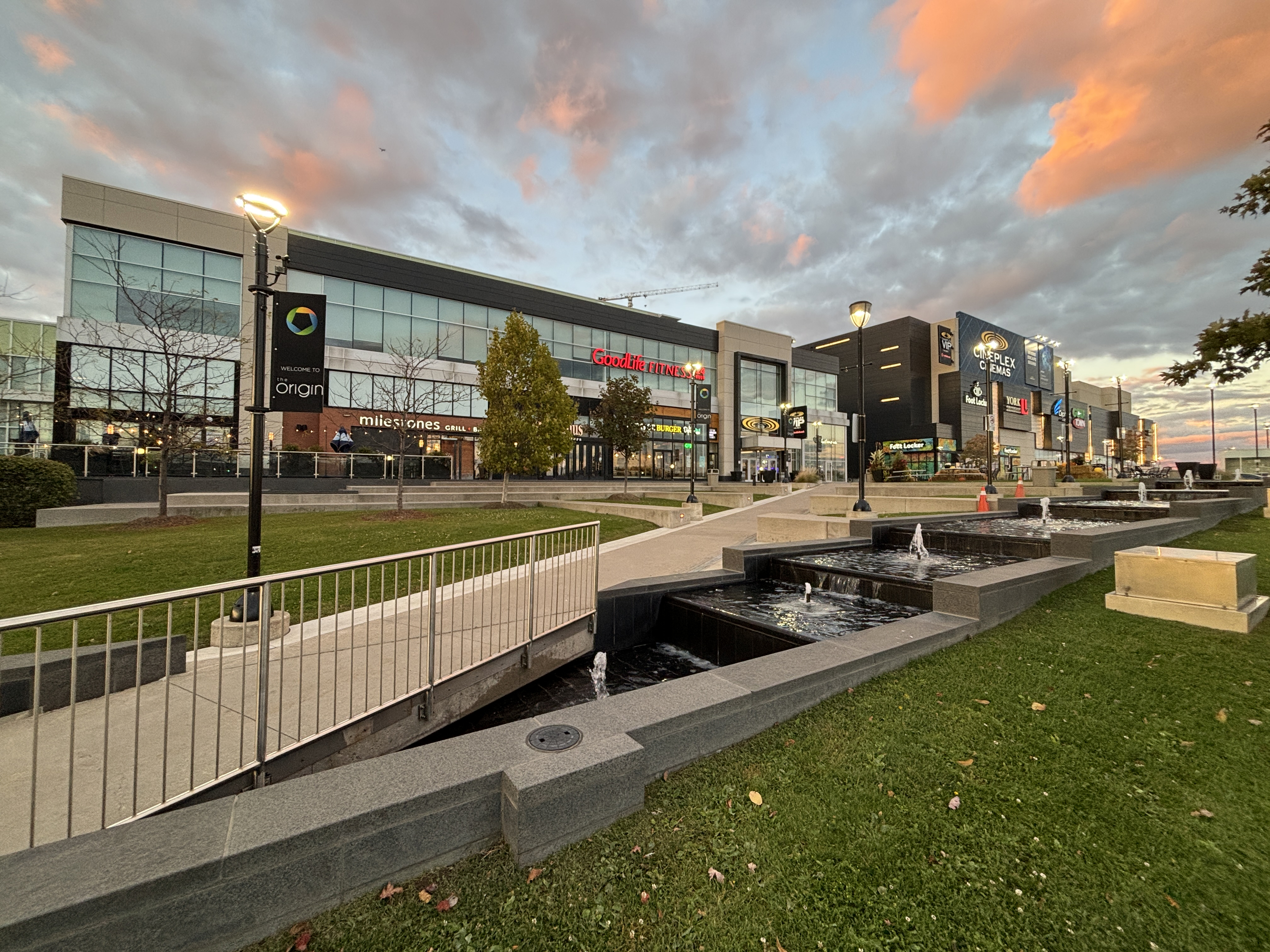
The Origin is the only one shopping arcade in Downtown Markham

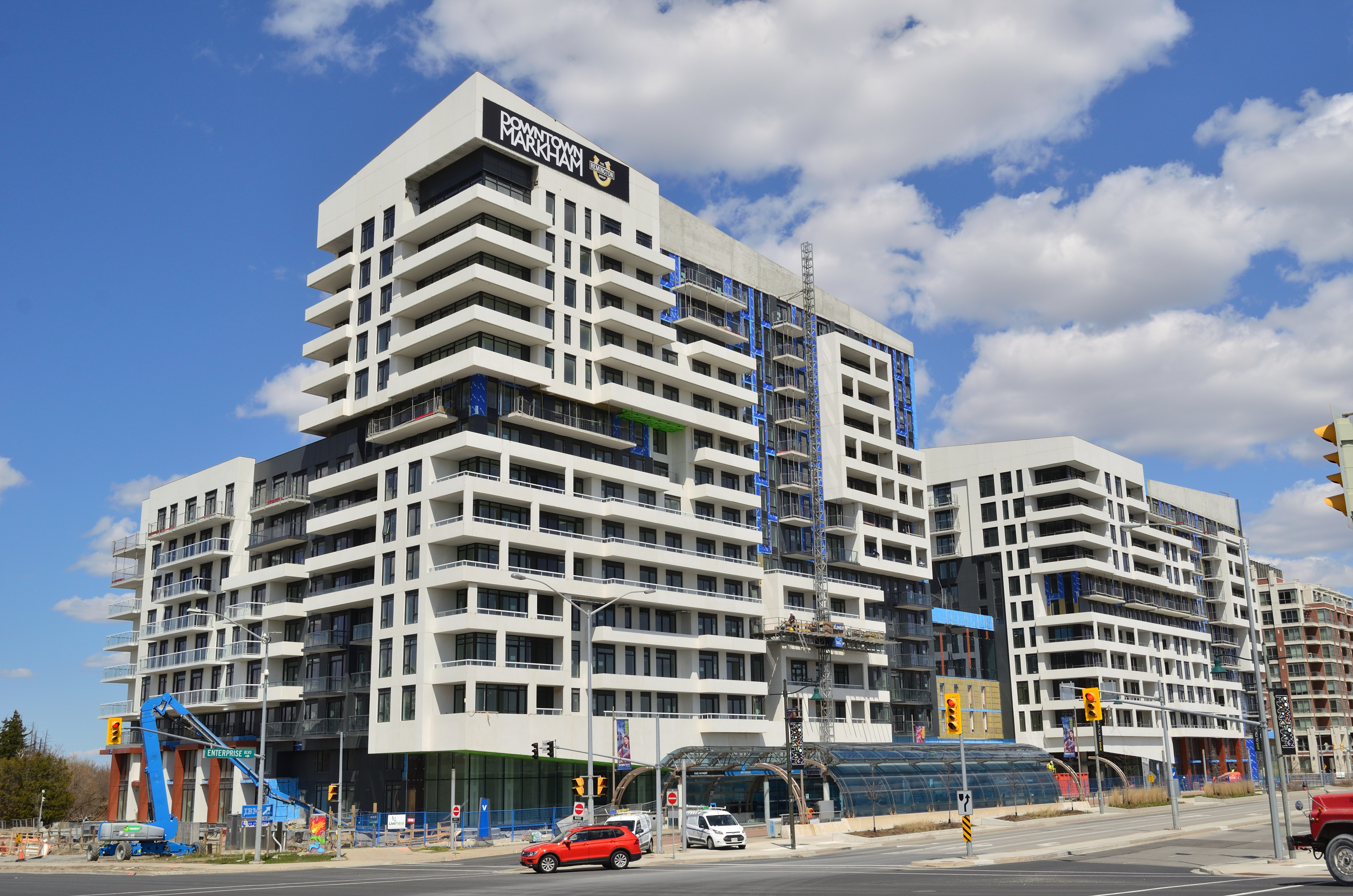
Downtown Markham condo under construction in 2020.

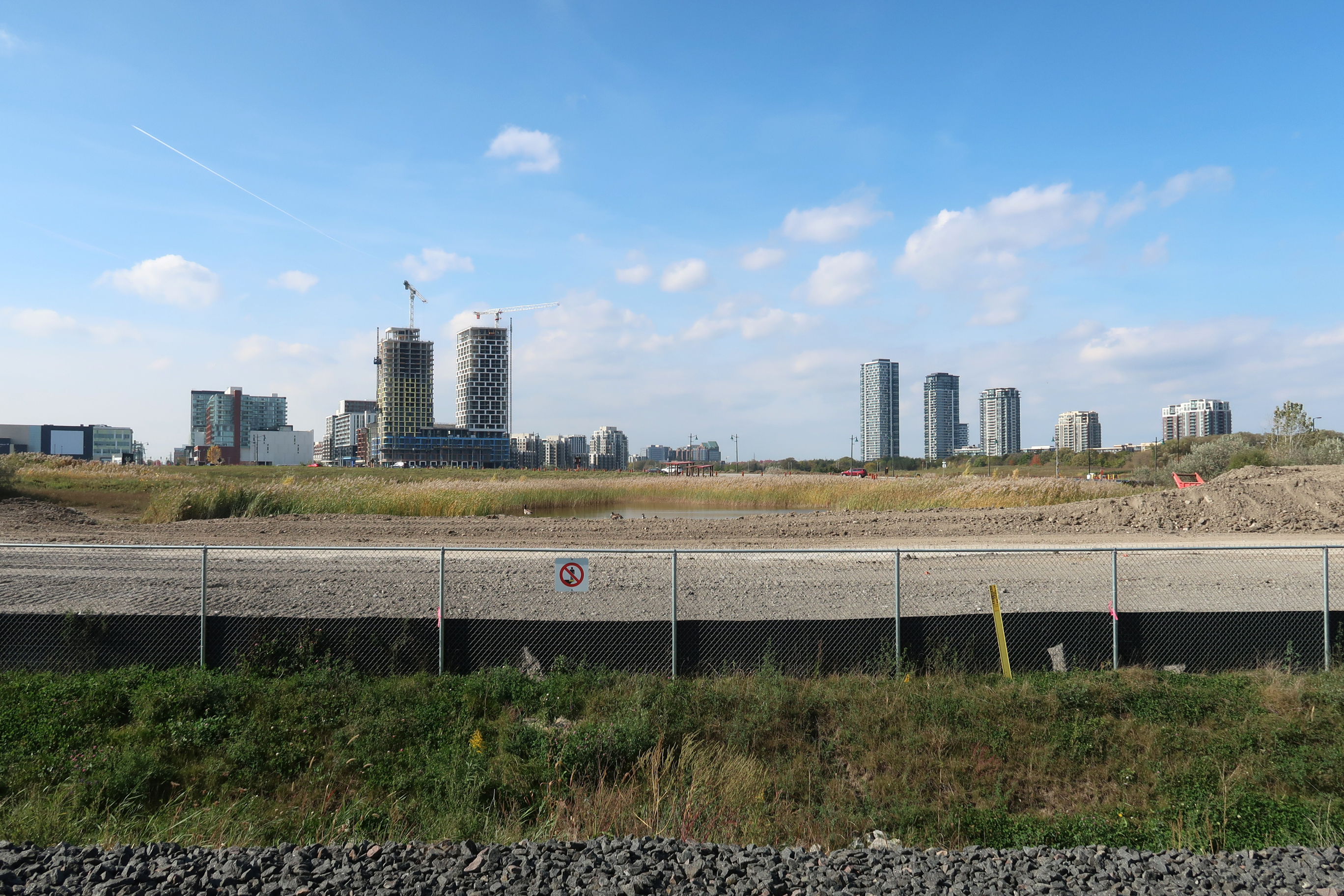
New Downtown Markham condos in 2023

The current City of Markham was created in 1971 when the original town was expanded by amalgamation with the surrounding namesake Markham Township which also contained the independent communities of Thornhill and Unionville. With its original historic downtown, Markham Village, being small and largely relegated to being a community node in the far eastern part of the amalgamated municipality, the city decided a larger, more centrally located downtown was needed.

The area south of Highway 7 and east of Warden Avenue was frozen for development by the province during the planning and construction of express toll road Highway 407. In 1992, a plan was approved to develop the area with higher commercial density.

The Town of Markham has approved the plan, according to Markham's former mayor, Donald Cousens. The new downtown was planned to be self-sustained and transit-oriented based on smart growth development. Construction began in 2005, when Enterprise Drive was completed.

Aviva Canada built its second Canadian headquarters on Birchmount Road and a new Cineplex theatre opened on April 4, 2015. It provides a bigger space to include a few VIP theatres, a new gaming corner and much higher capacity than the old Cineplex theatre at First Markham Place.

The Marriott hotel and the York condo was constructed on the corner of Enterprise Drive and Birchmount Road. It was finished by the end of 2018.

== Development ==
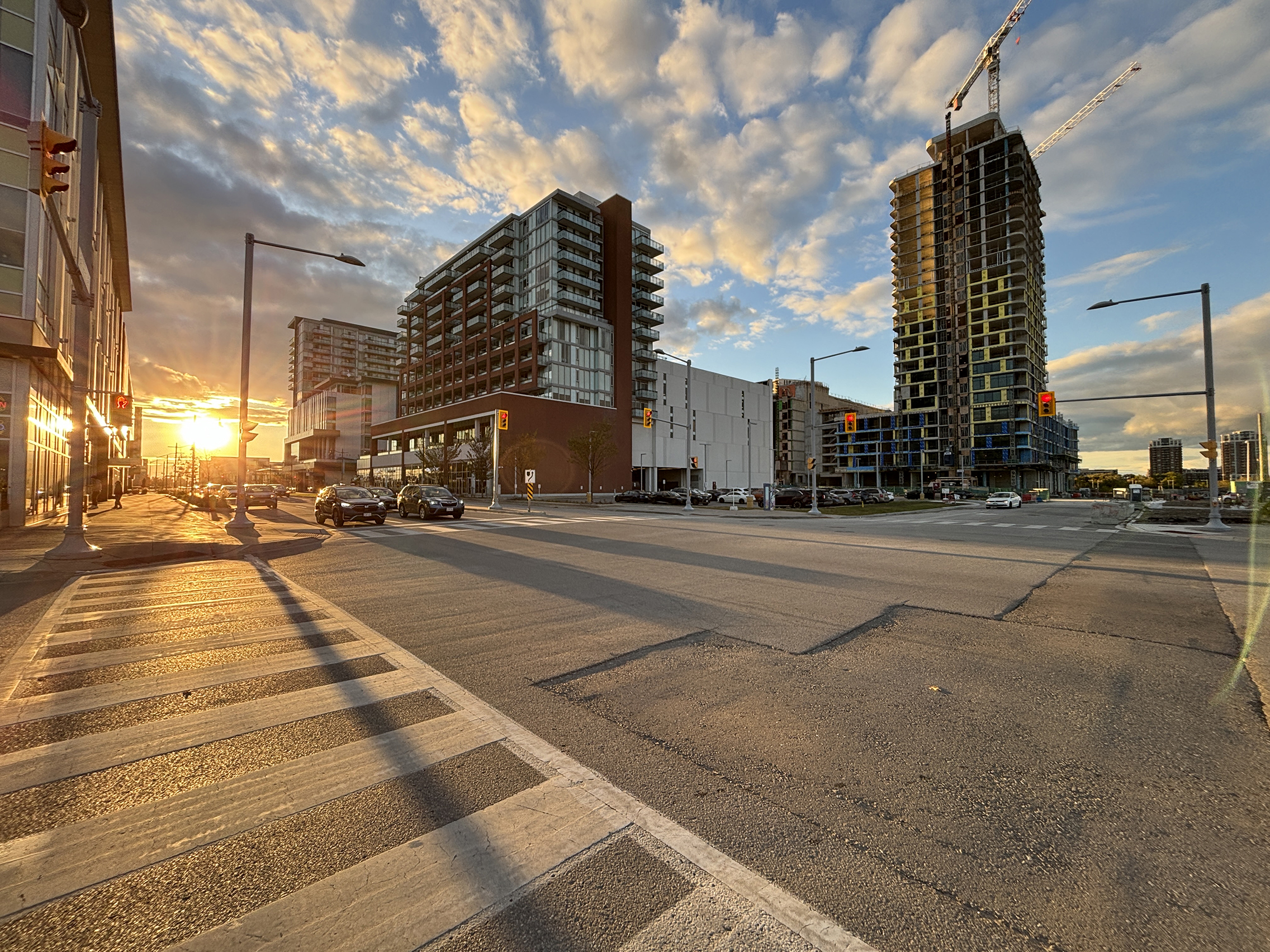
Enterprise Blvd at Andre De Grasse Street

Downtown Markham is using a development strategy named smart growth, and the community will try to limit urban sprawl by creating a denser urban centre. The urban centre is planned to be a transit-oriented community, with everything close by and fully transit dependent. In addition, the community was also planned to be environmentally sustainable as well.

The community was planned by the City of Markham, in cooperation with The Remington Group. The Remington Group is mainly in charge of constructing most of the structures across this new community.

According to the plan approved by the city council, the community will contain residential condos and townhouses, commercial, and retail buildings. Some of these structures have already begun construction. Updates as to what is built is underway.

Downtown Markham has been nominated as the country's largest mixed-used development, as well as North America's largest LEED (leadership-in-energy-and-environmental-design) registered development.

== Transportation ==
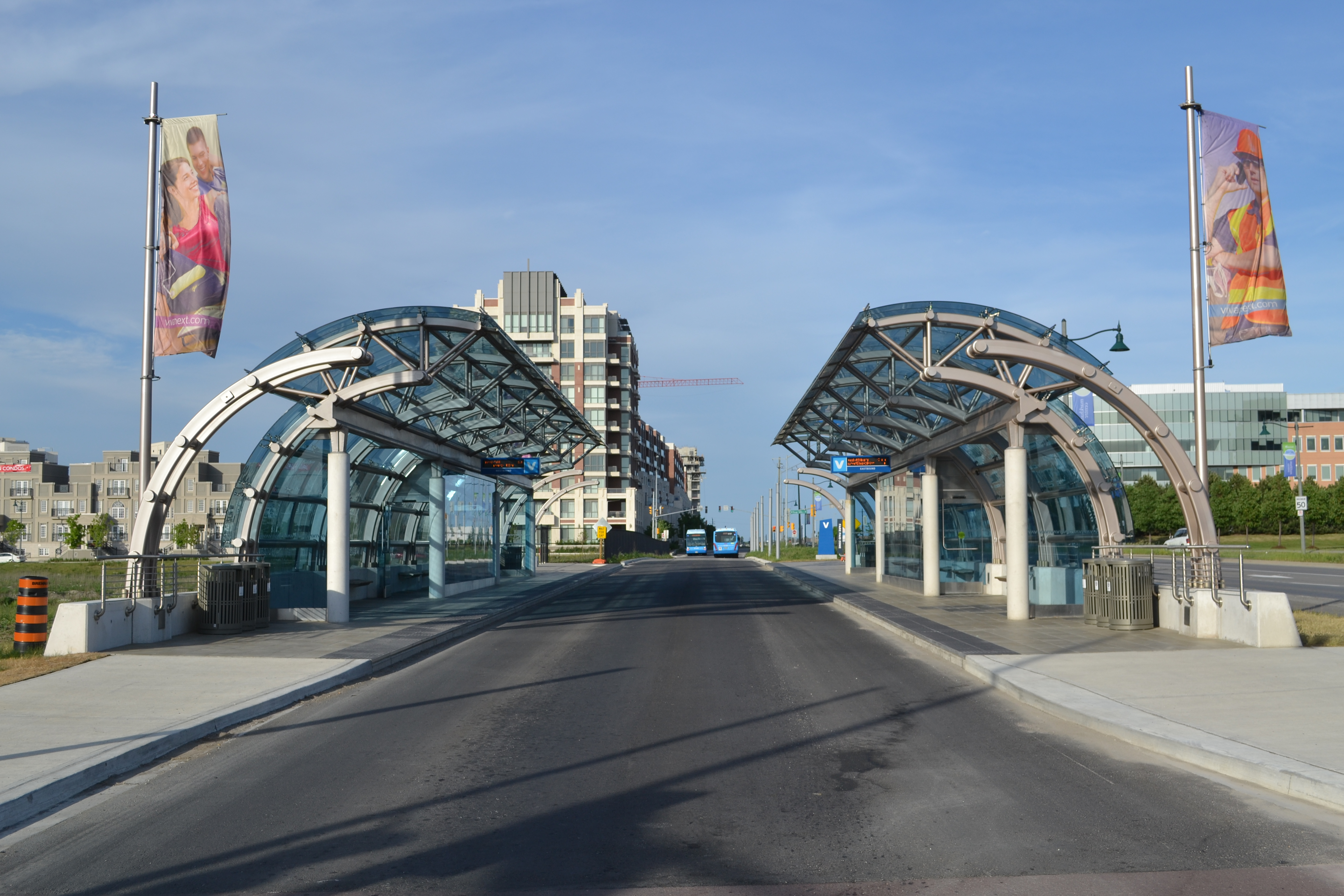
Warden Vivastation

The primary modes of transportation in Downtown Markham are: Regional Roads, municipal roads, a toll highway, bus rapid transit, and GO Trains.

=== Arterial roads ===
The downtown area is bounded with three arterial streets, which are numbered York Regional Roads: Kennedy Road (York Road 3), Highway 7 (York Road 7, which was formerly Provincial Highway 7), and Warden Avenue (York Road 65).

=== Toll highway ===
Highway 407 serves the area with exits on Warden Avenue and Kennedy Road.

=== Bus rapid transit ===
The community is served by the Warden, Enterprise and Unionville stops on the VIVA bus rapid transit system. Warden and Enterprise are served by three lines: Viva Purple, Viva Green, and Viva Pink, while Unionville Station is only served by Viva Pink. As of 2011, Viva Purple is the only line with all-day service, the other lines operate only during rush hour. It is scheduled that when Downtown Markham is fully functional and occupied, Viva Green will return to full service. The community is anticipated to be highly dependent on these transit routes, as part of the planned smart growth.

Viva Purple connects the locale to Cornell and York University; Viva Green connects the locale to Don Mills Station and Cornell; Viva Pink connects the locale to North York City Centre.

Other bus routes that serve the area include:

- TTC 68 Warden
- TTC 17 Birchmount
- YRT 8 Kennedy
- YRT 1 Highway 7

=== GO Transit ===
GO Transit operates Unionville GO Station on the Stouffville line during peak commuter traffic. The GO train line connects the Downtown Markham to Stouffville and Downtown Toronto.

== Environmental sustainability ==
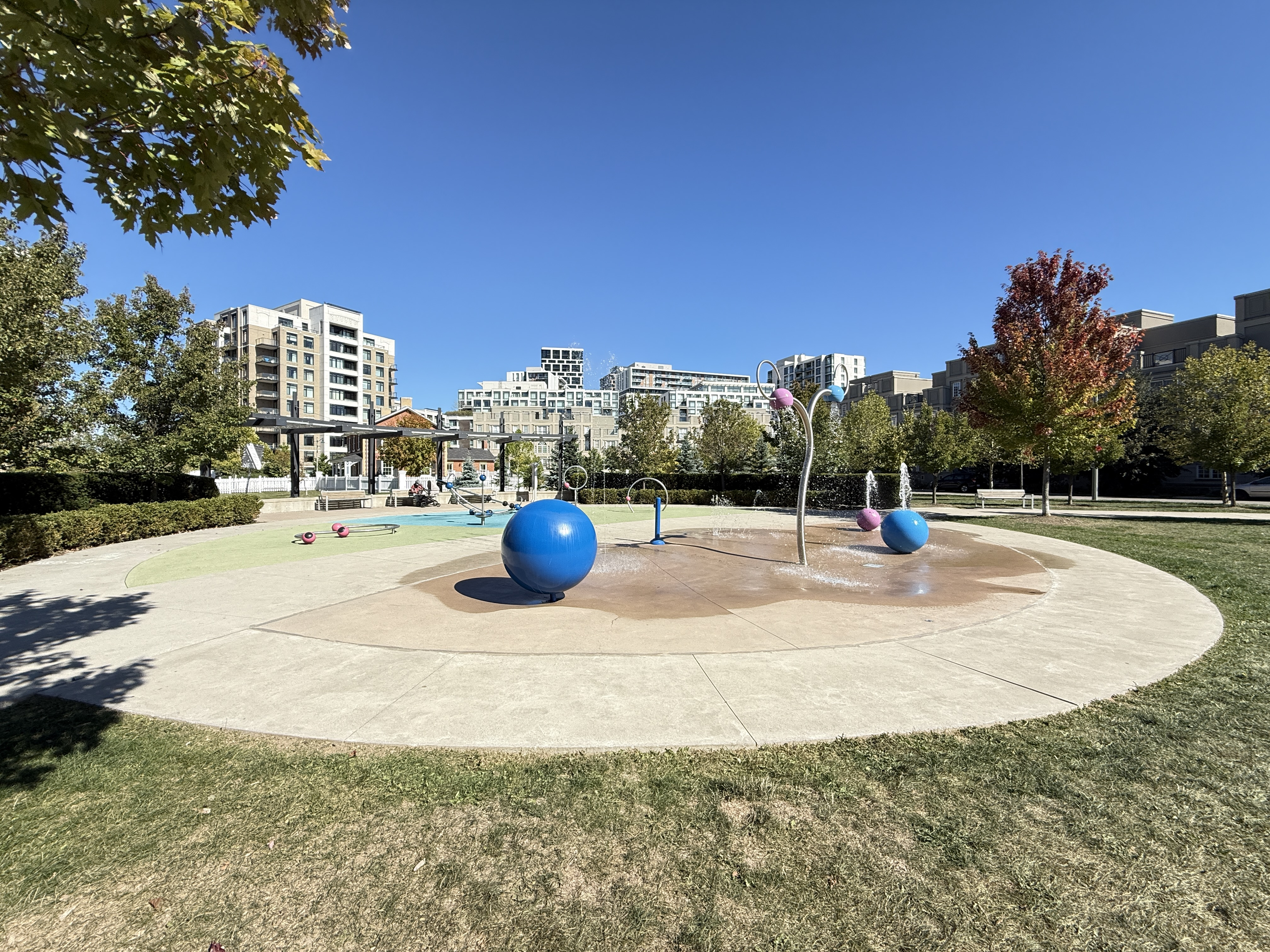
Roseberry Park

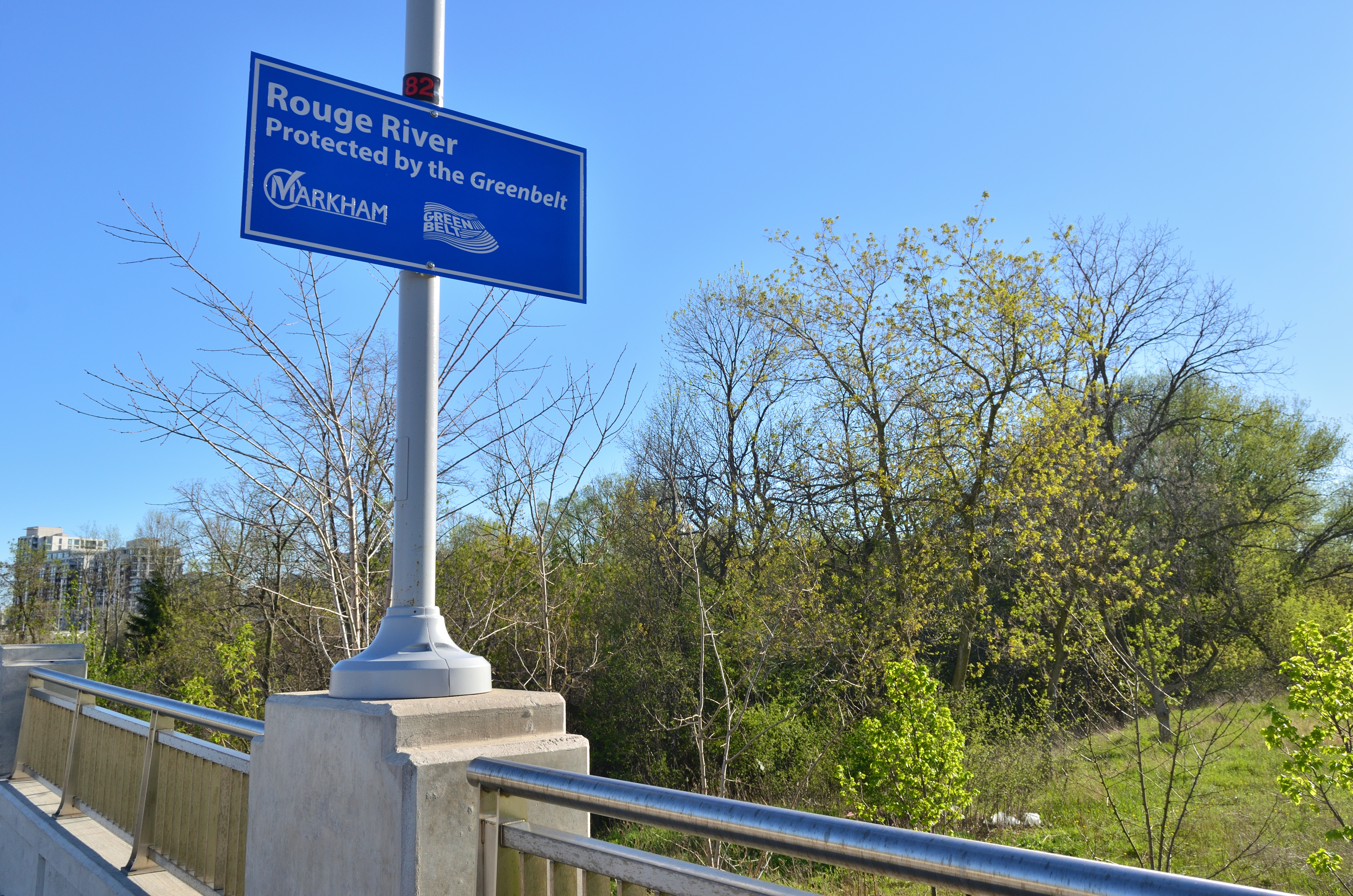
Rouge River at Birchmount Road (with condo buildings at Downtown Markham in the background)

The community reserves 72 acres (290,000 m^{2}) as a natural reserve, which includes an ecologically sensitive area, Rouge River.

== Facilities ==
There are two recreational facilities in Downtown Markham:

- Markham Pan Am Centre was built for 2015 Pan American Games and became a city-owned facility after completion of the games in September 2015
- Markham YMCA Rudy Bratty Centre was completed in 2006 and upgraded in 2008; featuring two pools and other fitness facilities for YMCA members

== Education ==
The York University Markham Campus is currently being built next to the Markham Pan Am Centre.

== Auto racing ==
On the weekend of August 15-16, 2026, the inaugural races of the NASCAR Canada Series Markham 125 and the IndyCar Series Ontario Honda Dealers Indy Markham, were held at the Markham Street Circuit, an auto racing street circuit using the Unionville GO station parking lot and access road, YMCA, University, and Enterprise Boulevards, and Kennedy Road. The latter race replaced the Grand Prix of Toronto from 1986 through 2025 around Exhibition Place near Downtown Toronto.
