= Judge Kennedy =

Judge Kennedy may refer to:

- Anthony Kennedy (born 1936), judge of the United States Court of Appeals for the Ninth Circuit, before being elevated to the United States Supreme Court
- Cornelia Groefsema Kennedy (1923–2014), judge of the United States Court of Appeals for the Sixth Circuit
- Harold Maurice Kennedy (1895–1971), judge of the United States District Court for the Eastern District of New York
- Henry H. Kennedy Jr. (born 1948), judge of the United States District Court for the District of Columbia
- Paul Kennedy (English judge) (born 1935), criminal court judge, Interception of Communications Commissioner, on Gibraltar appellate court
- Thomas Blake Kennedy (1874–1957), judge of the United States District Court for the District of Wyoming

== See also ==
- Justice Kennedy (disambiguation)
