= Los Ejes De Mi Carreta =

Song written by the Uruguayan Romildo Risso

Los Ejes De Mi Carreta (My cart's axles) is originally a poem written by Uruguayan poet Romildo Risso. Argentine singer Atahualpa Yupanqui popularized it by adapting it to a song in the milonga style. It has become a classic for singers from around the world.

The poem was written as a form of reflection of the gaucho lifestyle, in which the poet narrates how people complain of his cart's creaking. He states that he doesn't mind it as it breaks the silence he experiences in his daily life. As a final admission, he admits that he'll never grease the axles. The full message narrates a lonesome way of living which is what the narrator takes control of his life's choices.
