= Kennedy Road =

Kennedy Road may refer to:

== Roads ==
=== Canada ===
- Kennedy Road, a numbered roads in Peel Region, Ontario
- Kennedy Road (Toronto), Ontario

=== Elsewhere ===
- Kennedy Avenue, Turkey
- Kennedy Road, Durban, South Africa
- Kennedy Road, Hong Kong, a road in Wan Chai
- Kennedy Expressway, Chicago, United States
- Kennedy Highway, Queensland, Australia
- Kennedytunnel, Antwerp, Belgium

== Horses ==
- Kennedy Road (horse), a thoroughbred racehorse
- Kennedy Road Stakes, a Canadian Thoroughbred horse race
