= Paula Nenette Pepin =

French composer, pianist and lyricist

Nenette
- Born: Antonietta Paule Pepin-Fitzpatrick; 9 April 1908; Saint Pierre et Miquelon
- Died: 14 November 1990 (aged 82) Buenos Aires, Argentina
- Genre: Argentine folk music
- Occupations: Composer, pianist and lyricist
- Spouse: Atahualpa Yupanqui

Antonietta Paule Pepin Fitzpatrick (9 April 1908 – 14 November 1990), also known as Nenette, was a French composer, pianist and lyricist.

== Biography ==
Nenette was born on the island of Saint Pierre et Miquelon, a French overseas territory located in the Atlantic coast of Canada. Her father Emmanuel Victor Pepin was French, and her mother Henriette Fitzpatrick was Canadian of Irish origin. She was known by her family as Nenette, diminutive of Antonietta. While still a child during the First World War, she moved to France with her parents and her older sister, Jeanne Henriette. In 1926 Jeanne finished school and travelled with a dance company to Buenos Aires, where she met her first husband. Two years later, once Nenette finished school, Jeanne invited her and her father to come out to Argentina. The two settled in Villa Ballester in Buenos Aires in 1928. Nenette entered the National Music Conservatory, where she studied piano under Juan José Castro, Pascual de Rogatis and Isabel Aretz. She toured Argentina on numerous occasions, performing classical music on the piano. In 1942, after a concert she gave in Tucumán, the organizers took her to hear folk music from northern Argentina played by Argentine singer Atahualpa Yupanqui. The two became friends, and four years later, in 1946, they moved in together.

The couple had their only child that same year, naming him Roberto "Koya" Chavero. Nenette gave up her career as a pianist and started working alongside her husband. During Yupanqui's persecution, Nenette took care of their son Roberto and composed songs with her husband. She was the author of some of the most recognized works of Yupanqui, which due to the machismo of the era had to be published under a male pseudonym Pablo del Cerro. She chose her pseudonym because of her name, Paule, and one of her favorite places, Cerro Colorado, in the Córdoba province. She also composed piano melodies such as Luna tucumana, El alazán, Indiecito dormido, Chacarera de las piedras, Vidalita tucumana, Zamba del otoño. In 1961, when she was 53 years old, she returned to France after a vacation with her son Robert, who was 15 years old at the time. She died in Buenos Aires on 14 November 1990 from a cardiac arrest. She requested her ashes to be scattered in the sea of her home island in the North Atlantic. Despite being one of the most important composers of Argentine, she never renounced her French nationality.
