= Kenedy =

Kenedy may refer to:

== Places ==
=== United States ===
- Kenedy, Texas, a city in Karnes County
- Kenedy County, Texas, a county
- Kenedy Independent School District, in Kenedy city, Texas
- Kenedy County Wide Common School District, in Kenedy County, Texas

== People ==
- Kenedy Corona (born 2000), Venezuelan baseball player
- Mifflin Kenedy (1818–1895), South Texas rancher and businessman and namesake of Kenedy County, Texas and Kenedy city, Texas
- Kyla Kenedy (born 2003), U.S. actress

Soccer players

- Kenedy (footballer), a.k.a. Robert Kenedy Nunes do Nascimento (born 1996), Brazilian soccer player
- Kenedy Silva Reis, a.k.a. Keninha (born 1985), Brazilian soccer player
- Daniel Kenedy, a.k.a. Daniel Kenedy Pimentel Mateus dos Santos (born 1975), Portuguese soccer player

== See also ==
- Kenidi family, a fictional family from North of 60, members such as Michelle Kenidi and Peter Kenidi
- Kennedy (disambiguation)
