= Lord Justice Kennedy =

Lord Justice Kennedy or Kennedy LJ may refer to:

- Sir Paul Kennedy (English judge) (born 1935), Lord Justice of Appeal from 1992 to 2005
- Sir William Rann Kennedy (1846-1915), Lord Justice of Appeal from 1907 to 1915

== See also ==
- Justice Kennedy (disambiguation)
