= 2026 Markham 125 =

11th race of the 2026 NASCAR Canada Series

Race details
- Race 11 of 14 in the 2026 NASCAR Canada Series season
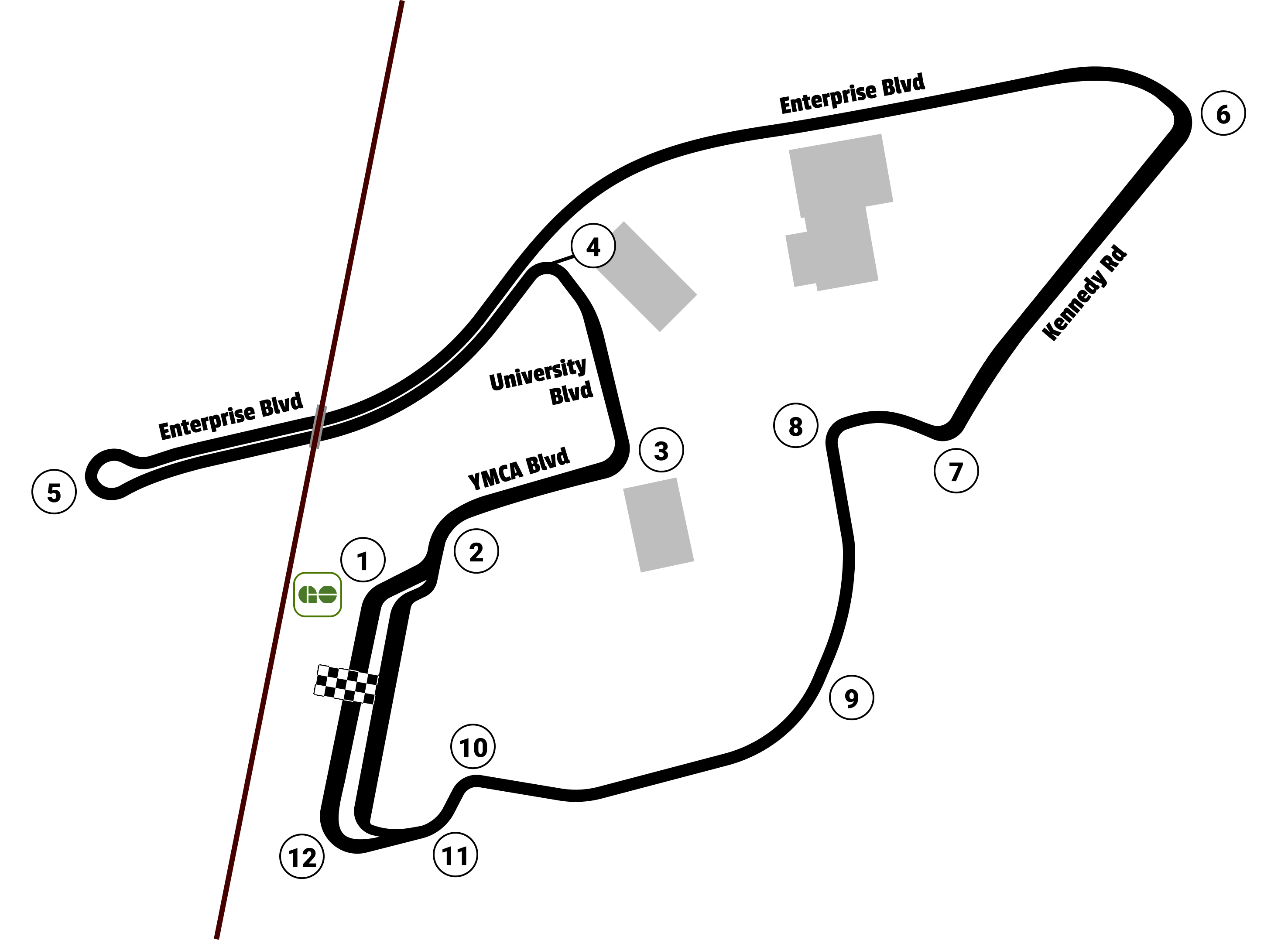
- Date: August 15, 2026
- Location: Markham Street Circuit in Markham, Ontario, Canada
- Course: Temporary street circuit
- Course length: 2.187 miles (3.520 km)
- Distance: 38 laps, 83.106 mi (133.746 km)
- Scheduled distance: 35 laps, 76.545 mi (123.187 km)
- Average speed: 63.299 miles per hour (101.870 km/h)

Pole position
Driver	Marc-Antoine Camirand	Paillé Course//Racing
- Time: 1:34.716

Most laps led
Driver	Marc-Antoine Camirand	Paillé Course//Racing
- Laps: 38

Winner
No. 96	Marc-Antoine Camirand	Paillé Course//Racing

Television in the United States
- Network: REV TV on YouTube

The 2026 Markham 125 was the eleventh stock car race of the 2026 NASCAR Canada Series and was the inaugural running of the race. The race was held on Saturday, August 15, 2026, at Markham Street Circuit, a 2.187 mi (3.520 km) street circuit in Markham, Ontario, Canada. The race went beyond the scheduled 35 lap distance, going into overtime. Polesitter Marc-Antoine Camirand, who had led the entire race, held off Andrew Ranger and L. P. Dumoulin to score the win, tying the single season win record with his seventh of the season. Ranger finished second and Dumoulin rounded out the podium in third.

== Background ==
The Markham Street Circuit is a 3.520 km (2.187 mi) street circuit in the city of Markham, Ontario that hosts series such as the NTT IndyCar Series and NASCAR Canada Series, beginning in 2026. The track replaced the Toronto Street Circuit in nearby Toronto.

=== Entry list ===
- (R) denotes rookie driver.
- (i) denotes driver who is ineligible for series driver points.

#	Driver	Team	Make
0	Glenn Styres	Glenn Styres Racing	Chevrolet
3	Connor Bell (R)	Ed Hakonson Racing	Chevrolet
8	Jonathan Woolridge (R)	Ed Hakonson Racing	Chevrolet
10	Trevor Hill (R)	MRN Racing Inc.	Chevrolet
17	D. J. Kennington	DJK Racing	Dodge
24	Jared Odrick (R)	BC Race Cars	Ford
27	Andrew Ranger	Innovation Auto Sport	Chevrolet
28	Brad Ranson (R)	DJK Racing	Chevrolet
38	Tyler Gonzalez (R)	RGR Motorsports	Ford
39	Alex Guenette	JASS Racing with XEMIS Racing	Chevrolet
47	L. P. Dumoulin	Dumoulin Compétition	Dodge
69	Domenic Scrivo	MBS Motorsports	Chevrolet
71	Gary Klutt	Legendary Motorcar Company	Dodge
73	Donald Theetge	Theetge Motorsports	Chevrolet
74	Kevin Lacroix	Innovation Auto Sport	Chevrolet
80	Alex Tagliani	Theetge Motorsports	Chevrolet
84	Larry Jackson	Larry Jackson Racing	Dodge
85	Darryl Timmers	Larry Jackson Racing	Dodge
87	Sam Fellows	Fellows McGraw Racing	Chevrolet
88	Simon Charbonneau	Eighty8 Racing	Chevrolet
93	Daniel Bois	JASS Racing with XEMIS Racing	Chevrolet
96	Marc-Antoine Camirand	Paillé Course//Racing	Chevrolet
98	Malcolm Strachan	Bray Autosport	Ford

== Practice/Qualifying ==
Practice was originally scheduled to be held on Friday, August 14, 2026, at 5:00 PM EST, with qualifying scheduled to be held at 5:35 PM EST. Due to ongoing preparations to the circuit by the race promoter, Friday sessions were postponed to Saturday morning; practice and qualifying were combined into one thirty minute session, where Marc-Antoine Camirand won the pole with a lap of 1:34.716 and a speed of 83.238 mph (133.959 km/h).

=== Practice/Qualifying results ===
Pos.	#	Driver	Team	Make	Time	Speed
1	96	Marc-Antoine Camirand	Paillé Course//Racing	Chevrolet	1:34.716	83.238
2	38	Tyler Gonzalez (R)	RGR Motorsports	Ford	1:34.924	83.056
3	47	L. P. Dumoulin	Dumoulin Compétition	Dodge	1:35.101	82.901
4	74	Kevin Lacroix	Innovation Auto Sport	Chevrolet	1:35.704	82.379
5	80	Alex Tagliani	Theetge Motorsports	Chevrolet	1:36.025	82.104
6	39	Alex Guenette	JASS Racing with XEMIS Racing	Chevrolet	1:36.144	82.002
7	27	Andrew Ranger	Innovation Auto Sport	Chevrolet	1:36.176	81.975
8	87	Sam Fellows	Fellows McGraw Racing	Chevrolet	1:36.549	81.658
9	3	Connor Bell (R)	Ed Hakonson Racing	Chevrolet	1:36.968	81.305
10	24	Jared Odrick (R)	BC Race Cars	Ford	1:36.980	81.295
11	71	Gary Klutt	Legendary Motorcar Company	Dodge	1:37.080	81.211
12	85	Darryl Timmers	Larry Jackson Racing	Dodge	1:37.404	80.941
13	17	D. J. Kennington	DJK Racing	Dodge	1:37.550	80.820
14	93	Daniel Bois	JASS Racing with XEMIS Racing	Chevrolet	1:37.888	80.541
15	98	Malcolm Strachan	Bray Autosport	Ford	1:38.129	80.343
16	8	Jonathan Woolridge (R)	Ed Hakonson Racing	Chevrolet	–	–
17	84	Larry Jackson	Larry Jackson Racing	Dodge	–	–
18	28	Brad Ranson (R)	DJK Racing	Chevrolet	–	–
19	10	Trevor Hill (R)	MRN Racing Inc.	Chevrolet	–	–
20	73	Donald Theetge	Theetge Motorsports	Chevrolet	–	–
21	0	Glenn Styres	Glenn Styres Racing	Chevrolet	–	–
22	69	Domenic Scrivo	MBS Motorsports	Chevrolet	–	–
23	88	Simon Charbonneau	Eighty8 Racing	Chevrolet	–	–
Full qualifying results

== Race results ==
Pos	St	#	Driver	Team	Manufacturer	Laps	Led	Status	Points
1	1	96	Marc-Antoine Camirand	Paillé Course//Racing	Chevrolet	38	38	Running	48
2	7	27	Andrew Ranger	Innovation Auto Sport	Chevrolet	38	0	Running	42
3	3	47	L. P. Dumoulin	Dumoulin Compétition	Dodge	38	0	Running	41
4	9	3	Connor Bell (R)	Ed Hakonson Racing	Chevrolet	38	0	Running	40
5	6	39	Alex Guenette	JASS Racing with XEMIS Racing	Chevrolet	38	0	Running	39
6	11	71	Gary Klutt	Legendary Motorcar Company	Dodge	38	0	Running	38
7	13	17	D. J. Kennington	DJK Racing	Dodge	38	0	Running	37
8	14	93	Daniel Bois	JASS Racing with XEMIS Racing	Chevrolet	38	0	Running	36
9	15	98	Malcolm Strachan	Bray Autosport	Ford	38	0	Running	35
10	12	85	Darryl Timmers	Larry Jackson Racing	Dodge	38	0	Running	34
11	20	73	Donald Theetge	Theetge Motorsports	Chevrolet	38	0	Running	33
12	18	28	Brad Ranson (R)	DJK Racing	Chevrolet	38	0	Running	32
13	17	84	Larry Jackson	Larry Jackson Racing	Dodge	38	0	Running	31
14	10	24	Jared Odrick (R)	BC Race Cars	Ford	38	0	Running	30
15	22	69	Domenic Scrivo	MBS Motorsports	Chevrolet	38	0	Running	29
16	5	80	Alex Tagliani	Theetge Motorsports	Chevrolet	36	0	Running	28
17	16	8	Jonathan Woolridge (R)	Ed Hakonson Racing	Chevrolet	33	0	Accident	27
18	4	74	Kevin Lacroix	Innovation Auto Sport	Chevrolet	33	0	Accident	26
19	23	88	Simon Charbonneau	Eighty8 Racing	Chevrolet	24	0	Transmission	25
20	19	10	Trevor Hill (R)	MRN Racing Inc.	Chevrolet	20	0	Brakes	24
21	8	87	Sam Fellows	Fellows McGraw Racing	Chevrolet	18	0	Accident	23
22	21	0	Glenn Styres	Glenn Styres Racing	Chevrolet	15	0	Mechanical	22
23	2	38	Tyler Gonzalez (R)	RGR Motorsports	Ford	1	0	Accident	21

== Standings after the race ==
	Pos	Driver	Points
	1	Marc-Antoine Camirand	503
	2	L. P. Dumoulin	420 (–83)
	3	Kevin Lacroix	393 (–110)
	4	D. J. Kennington	377 (–126)
	5	Connor Bell	372 (–131)
	6	Donald Theetge	360 (–143)
	7	Alex Tagliani	347 (–156)
2	8	Andrew Ranger	344 (–159)
1	9	Larry Jackson	339 (–164)
1	10	Alex Guenette	324 (–179)

Previous race: 2026 Le Tours 45 CarGurus	NASCAR Canada Series; 2026 season	Next race: 2026 NAPA 100
