= IndyCar Series at Markham Centre =

American motorsport race at Markham

Grand Prix of Markham
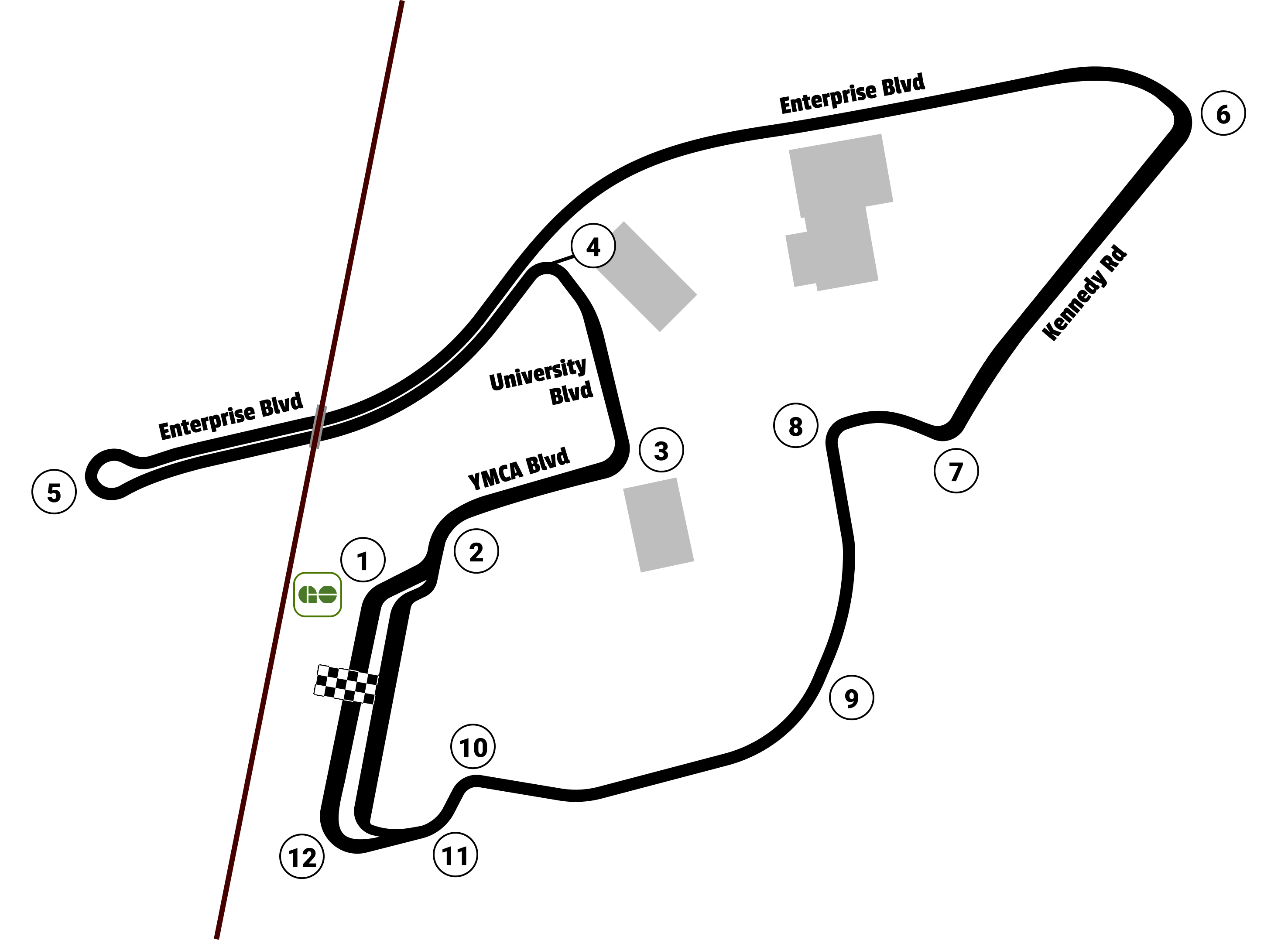

IndyCar Series
- Venue: Markham Street Circuit
- Location: Markham, Ontario
- Corporate sponsor: Ontario Honda Dealers
- First race: 2026
- Distance: 197.1 mi (317.202 km)
- Laps: 90
- Most wins (driver): (Sweden) Marcus Ericsson (1)
- Most wins (team): (United States) Andretti Global (1)
- Most wins (manufacturer): Chassis: Dallara IR-18 (1); Engine: Honda (1)

Circuit information
- Length: 3.52 km (2.19 mi)
- Turns: 12

The Ontario Honda Dealers Indy at Markham is a IndyCar Series race that is held at the Markham Street Circuit, in downtown Markham, Ontario, Canada. This race replaces the race held at Exhibition Place in nearby Toronto.

== History ==
On September 3, 2025, it was announced that the Grand Prix of Toronto would be moved from Exhibition Place to Markham Centre in Markham, Ontario as part of a 5-year deal. The inaugural race was held on August 16, 2026.

== Past winners ==
Season	Date	Driver	Team	Chassis	Engine	Race Distance		Race Time	Average Speed	Report
Season	Date	Driver	Team	Chassis	Engine	Laps	Miles (km)	Race Time	Average Speed	Report
2026	August 16	(Sweden) Marcus Ericsson	Andretti Global	Dallara IR-18	Honda	90	197.1 (317.2)	2:16:22	83.156	Report

Preceded by Grand Prix of Portland	IndyCar Series; Ontario Honda Dealers Indy at Markham	Succeeded by Freedom 250 Grand Prix
