= Kennedy Lake =

Kennedy Lake may refer to:

- Kennedy Lake (Arizona)
- Kennedy Lake (Glacier County, Montana)
- Kennedy Lake (Vancouver Island)
