= Kennedy Middle School =

Kennedy Middle School or John F. Kennedy Middle School may refer to any of a number of middle schools, including:

- Kennedy Middle School (Atlanta, Georgia)
- Kennedy Middle School (Cupertino, California)
- Kennedy Middle School (Germantown, Wisconsin)
- Kennedy Middle School (Natick, Massachusetts)
- Kennedy Middle School (Redwood City, California)
- Kennedy Middle School (Rockford, Illinois), in Rockford, Illinois
- Kennedy Middle School (Winston-Salem, North Carolina)
- John F. Kennedy Catholic School (Washington, Pennsylvania), in Washington, Pennsylvania
- John F. Kennedy Middle School (Enfield, Connecticut)
- John F. Kennedy Middle School (Nashville, Tennessee)
- John F. Kennedy Middle School (North Miami Beach, Florida)
- John F. Kennedy Middle School (Northampton, Massachusetts)
- John F. Kennedy Middle School (Sloan, New York)
- John F. Kennedy Middle School (Southington, Connecticut)
- John F. Kennedy Middle School (St. Clair Shores, Michigan)
- John F. Kennedy Middle School (Suffolk, Virginia)
- John F. Kennedy Middle School (Utica, New York)
- John F. Kennedy Middle School (Plainfield, Illinois)

== See also ==
- John F. Kennedy Junior High School
- John F. Kennedy School, Berlin
- Kennedy Junior High School
- Kennedy Metro Middle School
