= Kennedy, Missouri =

Extinct hamlet in Missouri, U.S.

Coordinates: 36°15′52″N 89°35′24″W

Kennedy is an extinct town in Pemiscot County, in the U.S. state of Missouri. The GNIS classifies it as a populated place.

A post office called Kennedy was established in 1890, and remained in operation until 1915. The community's name honors the local Kennedy family.
