= Kennedy, Illinois =

- Unincorporated community
- Location within Illinois Location within the United States
- Coordinates: 42°14′33″N 87°52′17″W
- Country: United States
- State: Illinois
- County: Lake
- Township: Shields
- Elevation: 686 ft (209 m)
- Time zone: UTC-6 (Central (CST))
  - Summer (DST): UTC-5 (CDT)
- Area codes: 847 & 224
- GNIS feature ID: 411397

Kennedy is an unincorporated community in Lake County, Illinois, United States. It is located at the intersection of Illinois Route 43 and Illinois Route 60.
