= NASCAR Canada Series at the Markham Street Circuit =

NASCAR Canada Series races in Downtown Markham

Markham 125
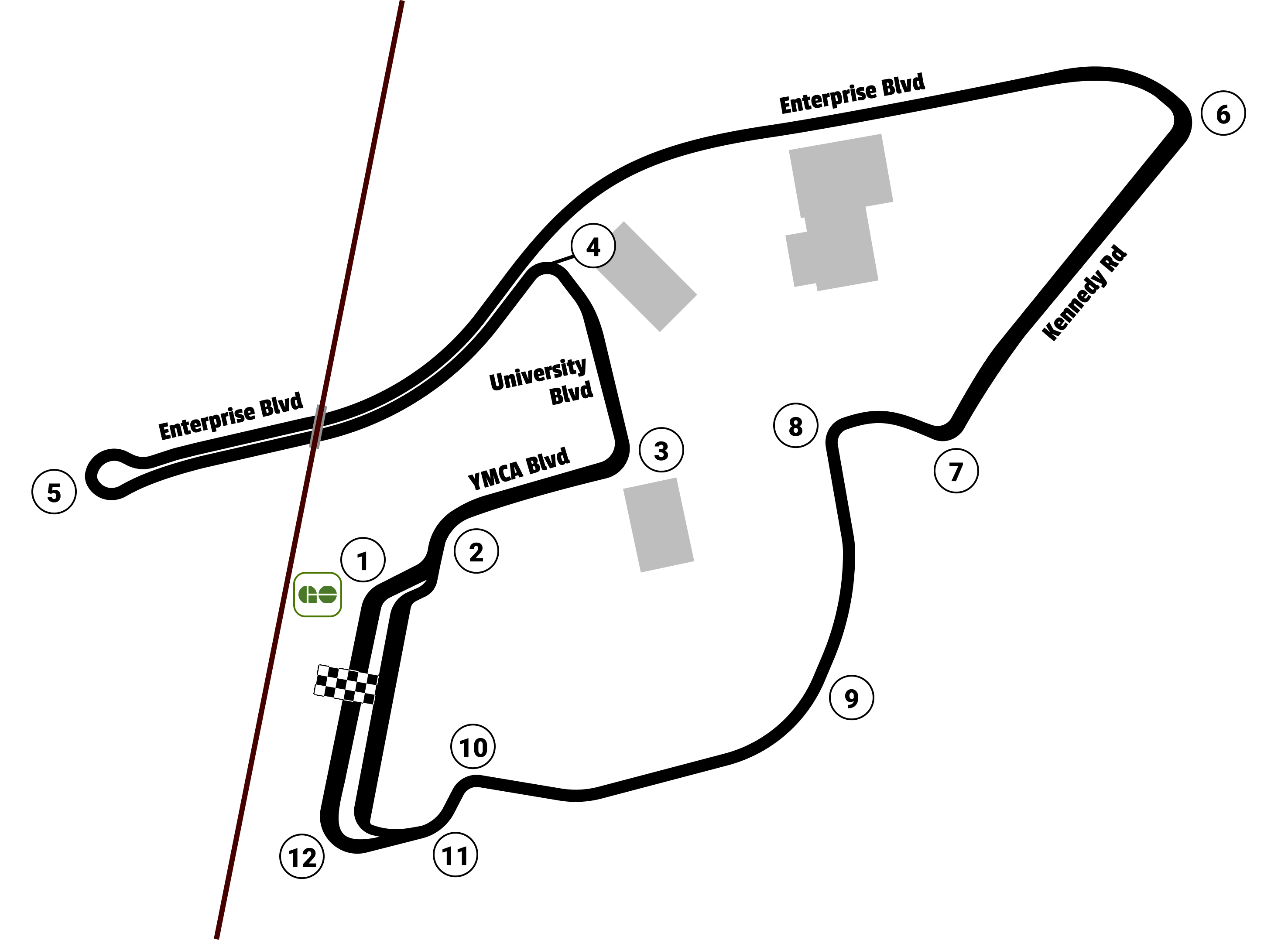

NASCAR Canada Series
- Venue: Markham Street Circuit, Downtown Markham
- Location: Markham, Ontario, Canada
- First race: 2026
- Distance: 264.33 km (164.25 mi)
- Laps: 35

Circuit information
- Length: 3.52 km (2.19 mi)
- Turns: 12

The Markham 125 is a stock car race in the NASCAR Canada Series that is held at the Markham Street Circuit, in Markham, Ontario, Canada beginning in 2026.

== History ==
On September 3, 2025, it was announced that the IndyCar Series' Grand Prix of Toronto would be moved from Exhibition Place to nearby Markham as part of a 5-year deal.

On December 19, 2025, the 2026 NASCAR Canada Series schedule was released, including the inaugural race in Downtown Markham on August 15, the day before the IndyCar Series race.

== Past winners ==
Year	Date	Driver	Team	Car	Distance	Report	Ref
NASCAR Canada Series
2026	August 15	Marc-Antoine Camirand	Paillé Course//Racing	Chevrolet	38 laps*	Report	

2026: Race extended due to NASCAR overtime.

Previous race: Le Tours 45 CarGurus (points); Omnifab Sprints (exhibition)	NASCAR Canada Series; Markham 125	Next race: NAPA 100
