= Justice Kennedy (disambiguation) =

Justice Kennedy refers to Anthony Kennedy (born 1936), associate justice of the United States Supreme Court. Justice Kennedy may also refer to:

- Hugh Kennedy (judge) (1879–1936), the first chief justice of Ireland
- Mark Kennedy (judge) (1952–2024), associate justice of the Alabama Supreme Court
- Paul Kennedy (American judge) (born 1948/49), associate justice of the New Mexico Supreme Court
- Sharon L. Kennedy (born 1962), associate justice of the Supreme Court of Ohio

== See also ==
- Lord Justice Kennedy (disambiguation)
- Judge Kennedy (disambiguation)
