= Markham Street Circuit =

Racetrack in Markham, Ontario, Canada

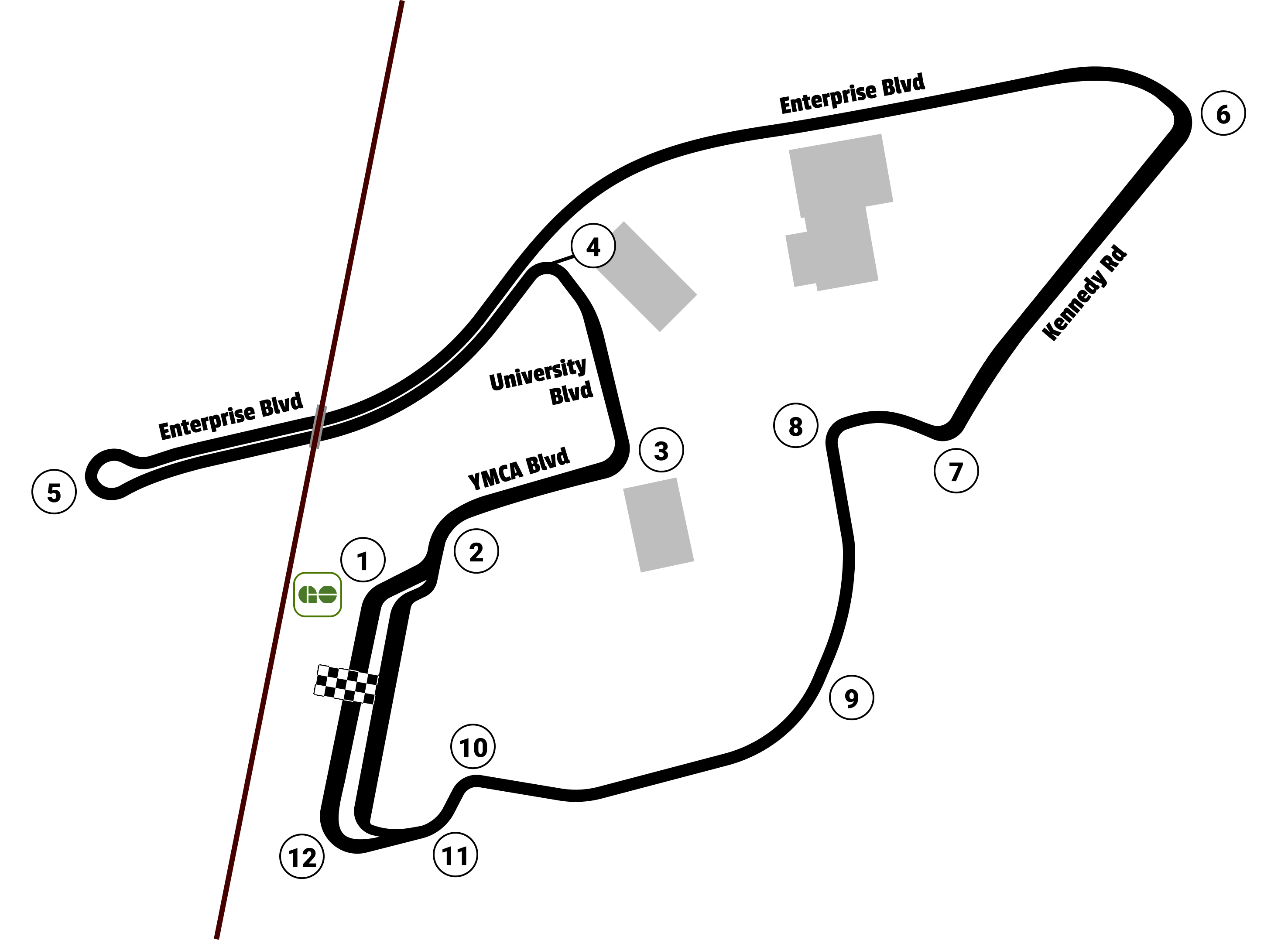
- Street Circuit (2026)
- Location: Markham, Ontario, Canada
- Coordinates: 43°51′04″N 79°18′53″W
- Opened: 15 August 2026; 2 months ago
- Architect: Tony Cottman
- Major events: Current: IndyCar Series; Ontario Honda Dealers Indy Markham (2026); NASCAR Canada Series; Markham 125 (2026)

Street Circuit (2026)
- Length: 3.380 km (2.100 mi)
- Turns: 12
- Race lap record: 1:14.2690 ( (Sweden) Marcus Ericsson, Dallara IR-18, 2026, IndyCar)

The Markham Street Circuit is a 3.380 km (2.100 mi) street circuit in Markham, Ontario, Canada. It hosts series such as the IndyCar Series and NASCAR Canada Series, beginning in 2026, replacing the Toronto Street Circuit in nearby Toronto.

== History ==
On 3 September 2025, it was announced that the Grand Prix of Toronto would be moved from Exhibition Place to Markham Centre in Markham, Ontario as part of a 5-year deal. The inaugural race took place on 16 August 2026.

On 19 December 2025, the 2026 NASCAR Canada Series schedule was released, including a race at the Markham Street Circuit on August 15, the day before the IndyCar Series race. The USF Pro 2000 Championship, USF2000 Championship, and Radical Cup Canada also competed at the track.

== Events ==
Current

- August: IndyCar Series Ontario Honda Dealers Indy Markham, NASCAR Canada Series Markham 125, USF Pro 2000 Championship, USF2000 Championship, Radical Cup Canada

== Lap records ==
As of August 2026, the fastest official race lap records at the Markham Street Circuit are listed as:

Category	Time	Driver	Vehicle	Event
Street Circuit (2026): 3.380 km (2.100 mi)
IndyCar	1:14.2690	Marcus Ericsson	Dallara IR-18	2026 Ontario Honda Dealers Indy Markham
USF Pro 2000	1:23.6482	Andrés Cárdenas	Tatuus IP-22	2026 USF Pro 2000 Continental Tire Grand Prix of Markham
USF2000	1:28.5957	Sebastián Garzón	Tatuus USF-22	2026 USF Pro 2000 Continental Tire Grand Prix of Markham
Radical Cup	1:31.400	Alex Tagliani	Radical SR3 XXR	2026 Markham Radical Cup Canada round
NASCAR Canada	1:33.595	Louis-Philippe Dumoulin	Dodge Charger NASCAR	2026 Markham 125
