= Kennedy brothers uprising =

Insurrection in Argentina (1932)

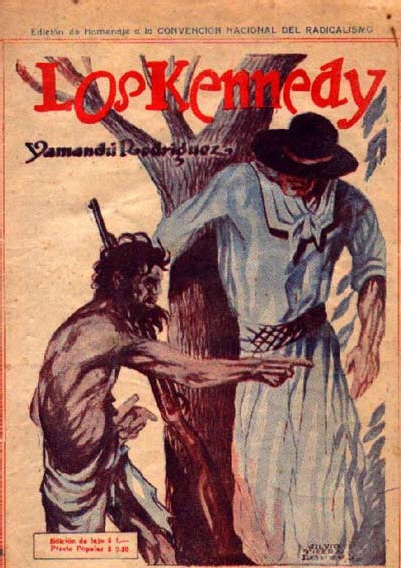
Cover of the book written by Yamandú Rodríguez (1934)

The Kennedy Brothers uprising, was a provincial insurrection in Argentina in 1932, in which a group of citizens led by three brothers of Irish descent, Eduardo, Roberto and Mario Kennedy took the city of La Paz, Entre Ríos, under a banner of defense of democracy, against the de facto military government of General José Félix Uriburu that had overthrown President of the Nation, Hipólito Yrigoyen, in a coup d'etat on September 6, 1930.

== Origins ==
The three brothers were the children of Carlos Duval Kennedy and Rufina Cárdenas, who had ten children in total). They were born in the "Los Algarrobos" ranch, located in the Estacas District of the La Paz Department in the northern Argentine province of Entre Ríos.

Conservative forces in the military and society had backed the coup that had toppled the Radical Civic Union government of Hipolito Yrigoyen. Simmering discontent led to a number of uprisings in provincial areas during the early 1930s (as the global Depression started to bite). The Kennedy Brothers led one such uprising.

== Uprising ==
On the night of the 3rd of January 1932, the Kennedys gathered together a small attack column of fourteen men. They were armed with various short arms and long arms. The Kennedy's had an ally in Lieutenant Gregorio Pomar, a military officer of democratic convictions (and former aide de camp of Irigoyen when he was president). The uprising had its Central Command in Concordia however that uprising was thwarted and the La Paz group did not receive the report. Thus the expected reinforcements did not come from the north and the uprising failed. There are several versions: some say that the intermediary did not sympathize with the Kennedys and delayed the announcement; others, that there were communication problems. In any case, the people of La Paz rose up: they took over the police station, the telegraph office, and guarded the banks so that the opportunity was not taken for them to be robbed. When the rebels arrived at the police station, they told the guard not to resist and that nothing was going to happen to him. But the guard triggered his Mauser and events descended into a confrontation in which five policemen died. From this rebel Yrigoyenista group there were no casualties. It was clear though that the uprising was failing and they decided to leave the city together.

== Failure and exile ==
The Governor of the province of Entre Ríos, Luis Etchevehere, followed orders from the national government to suppress the uprising by water, land and air. Seven war planes dropped their bombs on the wooded areas of La Paz where the rebels were hiding out. The uprising was swiftly snuffed out and the brothers fled across the River Parana to neighbouring Uruguay.

An amnesty followed at the end of the 1930s and Mario Kennedy returned to Corrientes, Roberto to La Paz and Eduardo remained in Buenos Aires. Many in the Radical Party had not looked fondly upon the uprising.

== Bibliography ==
- Daniel González Rebolledo - Los Kennedy del Sur - Simurg Ediciones - Bs. As., 2007 Arturo Jauretche, “Paso de los Libres”.
- Ricardo Lopa, "Los Fabulosos Kennedy: ensayo historico de una revolucion"
- Ricardo Lopa, "La Patriada de Nuestros Paisanos Los Kennedy"
- Carlos Rodríguez Armesto, “La revolución de los Kennedy”. En Semanario El Paceño, enero de 1989.
- Jorge y Oscar Escurra, “El Levantamiento del 20 de julio de 1931”.
- Trinidad Torres Pretel, escritos personales, 1973, Museo Regional La Paz.
- Yamandú Rodríguez, “Los Kennedy”.
- Marcelo Faure, "Los Kennedy de La Paz".
- Jorge Repiso, "Los Kennedy. Tres hermanos que casi cambiaron la historia"
