= Atahualpa Yupanqui =

Argentine musician and writer (1908–1992)

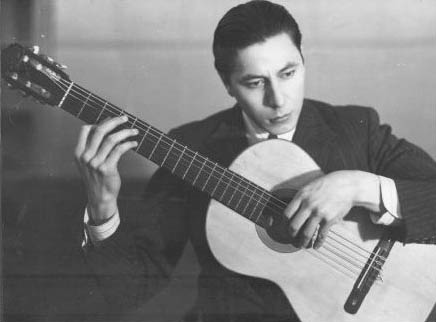
- Yupanqui in 1935

Background information
- Born: Héctor Roberto Chavero Aramburu; 31 January 1908
- Origin: Juan A. de la Peña, Pergamino Partido, Argentina
- Died: 23 May 1992 (aged 84) Nîmes, France
- Genres: Payada, trova
- Occupations: Singer, songwriter, writer
- Instruments: Guitar, vocals

Atahualpa Yupanqui (Spanish pronunciation: [ataˈwalpa ʝuˈpaŋki]; born Héctor Roberto Chavero Aramburu; 31 January 1908 – 23 May 1992) was an Argentine singer, songwriter, guitarist, and writer. He is considered one of the most important Argentine folk musicians of the 20th century.

== Biography ==
Yupanqui was born Héctor Roberto Chavero Aramburu in Pergamino (Buenos Aires Province), in the Argentine pampas, about 200 kilometers from Buenos Aires. His father was a mestizo of Quechua and Basque origins, while his mother was born in the Basque country. His family moved to the city of Tucumán in northwestern Argentina when he was nine. In a bow to two legendary Incan kings, he adopted the stage name Atahualpa Yupanqui.

In his early years, Yupanqui traveled extensively through the northwest of Argentina and the Altiplano studying the indigenous cultures. He became politically active and joined the Communist Party of Argentina. In 1931, he took part in the failed Kennedy brothers uprising against the de facto government of José Félix Uriburu and in support of deposed president Hipólito Yrigoyen. After the uprising was defeated, he was forced to seek refuge in Uruguay. He returned to Argentina in 1934.

In 1935, Yupanqui paid his first visit to Buenos Aires; his compositions were growing in popularity, and he was invited to perform on the radio. Shortly thereafter, he made the acquaintance of pianist Antonieta Paula Pepin Fitzpatrick, nicknamed "Nenette", who became his lifelong companion and musical collaborator under the pseudonym "Pablo Del Cerro".

Because of his Communist Party affiliation (which lasted until 1952), his work suffered from censorship during Juan Perón's presidency. He was detained and incarcerated several times. Between 1944 and 1949, he was exiled in Uruguay. In 1944 he was hired by Samuel V. de León to perform in the city of Durazno for the benefit of students of the city, who had been collecting money to fundraise for the Misiones Socio Pedagógicas. To mark his first visit to the city he composed "A orillas del Yí", and dedicated it to Julio Martínez Oyanguren. In 1949, he travelled to Europe. Édith Piaf invited him to perform in Paris on 7 July 1950, and he soon signed a contract with Le Chant du Monde, the recording company that published his first LP in Europe, Minero Soy (I am a miner). This record won first prize for best foreign disc at an international folklore contest at the Académie Charles Cros, which had three hundred fifty participants from around the world. He subsequently toured extensively throughout Europe.

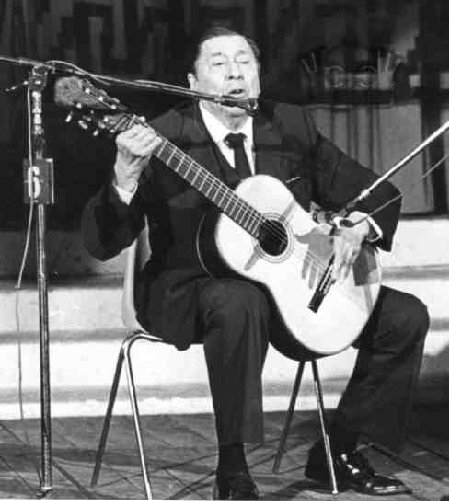
Yupanqui at Cosquín Festival (1979).

In 1952, Yupanqui returned to Buenos Aires. He broke with the Communist Party, which made it easier for him to book radio performances. With Nenette, they constructed their house on Cerro Colorado (Córdoba).

Recognition of Yupanqui's ethnographic work became widespread during the 1960s, and nueva canción artists such as Facundo Cabral, Mercedes Sosa and Jorge Cafrune recorded his compositions and made him popular among younger musicians, who referred to him as Don Ata.

From 1963 to 1964, he toured Colombia, Japan, Morocco, Egypt, Israel, and Italy. In 1967, he toured Spain, and settled in Paris. He returned regularly to Argentina and appeared in Argentinísima II in 1973, but these visits became less frequent after Jorge Videla and his military dictatorship came to power in 1976.

== Awards and recognition ==
In February 1968, Yupanqui was named a knight of the Ordre des Arts et des Lettres by the French Ministry of Culture, in honor of his 18 years of work enriching the literature of the French nation. Some of his songs are included in the programs of institutes and schools where Castilian literature is taught.

In 1985, the Argentinian Konex Foundation granted him the Diamond Konex Award, one of the most prestigious awards in Argentina, as the most important popular musician in the last decade in his country.

In 1989, the University of Nanterre, France, commissioned Yupanqui to write the lyrics of a cantata to commemorate the bicentenary of the French Revolution. The piece, entitled "The Sacred Word" (Parole sacrée), was a tribute to oppressed peoples.

== Death ==
Yupanqui died in Nîmes, France in 1992 at the age of 84; his remains were cremated and dispersed on his beloved Colorado Hill on 8 June 1992.

== Best-known songs ==
Yupanqui's best-known compositions include:

- "Basta Ya"
- "Los Hermanos"
- "Viene clareando"
- "El arriero"
- "Zamba del grillo"
- "La añera"
- "La pobrecita"
- "Milonga del peón de campo"
- "Camino del indio"
- "Chacarera de las piedras"
- "Recuerdos del Portezuelo"
- "El alazán"
- "Indiecito dormido"
- "El aromo"
- "Le tengo rabia al silencio"
- "Piedra y camino"
- "Luna tucumana"
- "Los Ejes De Mi Carreta"
- "Sin caballo y en Montiel"
- "Cachilo dormido"
- "Tú que puedes vuélvete"
- "Nada mas"
- "Preguntitas sobre Dios"
- "La arribeña"
- "La colorada"

== Books ==
- Piedra sola (1940)
- Aires indios (1943)
- Cerro Bayo (1953)
- Guitarra (1960)
- El canto del viento (1965)
- El payador perseguido (1972)
- Del algarrobo al cerezo (1977)
- La Capataza (1992)

== Albums ==
- Hits Collection Yupanqui Atahualpa
- Basta Ya 2006
- ¡Soy Libre! ¡Soy Bueno! (1968)
