= Alex Guenette =

Canadian racing driver (born 1996)

- Born: April 25, 1996 (age 30); Terrebonne, Quebec, Canada
- Height: 6 ft 1 in (1.85 m)
- Weight: 175 lb (79 kg)
- Achievements: 2012 Quebec Super Truck Series Rookie of the Year
- Awards: 2013 NASCAR Canadian Tire Series Most Popular Driver

NASCAR O'Reilly Auto Parts Series career
- 8 races run over 3 years
- 2026 position: 56th
- Best finish: 49th (2016)
- First race: 2016 Ollie's Bargain Outlet 200 (Dover)
- Last race: 2026 Mission 200 at The Glen (Watkins Glen)
Wins	Top tens	Poles
0	0	0

NASCAR FedEx Freight Truck Series career
- 3 races run over 2 years
- 2014 position: 54th
- Best finish: 54th (2014)
- First race: 2013 Chevrolet Silverado 250 (Mosport)
- Last race: 2014 Kroger 200 (Martinsville)
Wins	Top tens	Poles
0	1	0

NASCAR Canada Series career
- 71 races run over 9 years
- Car no., team: No. 39 (JASS Racing with XEMIS Racing)
- 2026 position: 9th
- Best finish: 7th (2021, 2023)
- First race: 2013 Pinty's Presents the Vortex 200 (Mosport)
- Last race: 2026 WeatherTech 200 (Mosport)
- First win: 2022 Les 60 Tours Rousseau Metal (Trois-Rivières)
- Last win: 2026 NAPA 100 (Circuit ICAR)
Wins	Top tens	Poles
2	48	1
- Statistics up to date as of November 7, 2026.

Alex Guenette (born April 25, 1996) is a Canadian professional stock car racing driver. He last competed part-time in the NASCAR Canada Series, driving the No. 39 for JASS Racing with XEMIS Racing, and part-time in the NASCAR O'Reilly Auto Parts Series, driving the No. 92 Chevrolet Camaro SS for DGM Racing with Jesse Iwuji Motorsports. He has also competed in other series, most notably the NASCAR Camping World Truck Series and ARCA Racing Series.

== Racing career ==
=== Early years ===
Guenette began his racing career at the age of seven, his father and grandfather being professional race car drivers. Before stock cars, Guenette raced go-karts, motocross and four-wheelers. He tested stock cars in 2011 at the age of fifteen, was rookie of the year in the 2012 Quebec Super Truck Series and finished second in the 2013 World Series of Asphalt. A longstanding tradition of Guenette's is to eat Tim Hortons on race mornings.

=== ARCA Racing Series ===
Guenette ran one ARCA race, at Talladega Superspeedway in 2014 for Mario Gosselin, a fellow Canadian. He finished 20th, two laps down.

=== NASCAR Canada Series ===
Guenette ran the entire Canadian Tire Series schedule in 2013. Running Dodges for Jacombs Racing, he posted two top-fives and another three top-tens in the No. 39, compared to two did not finishes. Of the top-fives, the best finish was a second place at Autodrome St. Eustache. He received major funding from Motos Illimitees, DLGL, and Kawasaki. Guenette was the series' most popular driver in 2013. In 2014, he ran four races in the No. 39, but with grandfather Jacques Guenette as the owner. He posted a best finish of second, which he accomplished twice, once at St. Eustache and once at Circuit ICAR.

=== NASCAR Camping World Truck Series ===
Guenette's first Truck start came for Gosselin, at Canadian Tire Motorsport Park, driving the No. 39 Chevrolet Silverado, running double duty with the NASCAR Pinty's Series race that weekend. He was running near the top ten until oil line issues hampered Guenette's effort, and he finished 25th. In 2014, both of his starts came at Martinsville Speedway. In the spring race, he start and parked for Gosselin, finishing last after running only 32 laps. For the fall, Guenette was picked to drive the No. 32 Chevrolet Silverado for Turner Motorsports. In final practice, he posted the fastest ten-lap average. He qualified twelfth and finished ninth after a flat tire dropped him from sixth.

=== NASCAR Xfinity Series ===
Guenette made his Xfinity debut on May 14, 2016 in the Ollie's Bargain Outlet 200. Driving the No. 97 for Obaika Racing, he finished fifteenth in his heat and twenty-seventh in the main race. Returning to the No. 97 at Pocono Raceway a few weeks later, Guenette posted his best career finish and only lead lap finish, a 24th. Running a third race for Obaika at Daytona International Speedway, an early wreck eliminated him from contention. For the series' next race at Kentucky Speedway, Guenette signed with fellow Canadian team King Autosport, finishing 26th. Guenette did not return to NASCAR competition in 2017.

In 2023, Guenette returned to NASCAR competition in the NASCAR Xfinity Series at the Chicago Street Course driving the No. 36 Chevrolet for DGM Racing.

== Motorsports career results ==
=== NASCAR ===
(key) (Bold – Pole position awarded by qualifying time. Italics – Pole position earned by points standings or practice time. * – Most laps led.)

==== O'Reilly Auto Parts Series ====
NASCAR O'Reilly Auto Parts Series results
Year	Team	No.	Make	1	2	3	4	5	6	7	8	9	10	11	12	13	14	15	16	17	18	19	20	21	22	23	24	25	26	27	28	29	30	31	32	33	NOAPSC	Pts	Ref
2016	Obaika Racing	97	Chevy	DAY	ATL	LVS	PHO	CAL	TEX	BRI	RCH	TAL	DOV; 27	CLT	POC; 24	MCH	IOW	DAY; 38																			49th	49	
2016	King Autosport	90	Chevy																KEN; 26	NHA	IND	IOW	GLN	MOH	BRI	ROA	DAR	RCH	CHI	KEN	DOV	CLT	KAN	TEX	PHO	HOM	49th	49	
2023	DGM Racing	36	Chevy	DAY	CAL	LVS	PHO	ATL	COA	RCH	MAR	TAL	DOV	DAR	CLT	PIR	SON	NSH	CSC; 15	ATL	NHA	POC	ROA	MCH	IRC	GLN											53rd	27	
2023	DGM Racing	91	Chevy																								DAY; 38	DAR	KAN	BRI	TEX						53rd	27	
2023	Emerling-Gase Motorsports	35	Toyota																													ROV; 33	LVS	HOM	MAR	PHO	53rd	27	
2026	DGM Racing with Jesse Iwuji Motorsports	92	Chevy	DAY	ATL	COA	PHO	LVS	DAR	MAR	CAR	BRI	KAN	TAL	TEX	GLN; 28	DOV	CLT	NSS	POC	COR	SON	CHI	ATL	IND	IOW	DAY	DAR	GTW	BRI	LVS	CLT	PHO	TAL	MAR	HOM	56th	9	

==== Camping World Truck Series ====
NASCAR Camping World Truck Series results
Year	Team	No.	Make	1	2	3	4	5	6	7	8	9	10	11	12	13	14	15	16	17	18	19	20	21	22	NCWTC	Pts	Ref
2013	DGM Racing	39	Chevy	DAY	MAR	CAR	KAN	CLT	DOV	TEX	KEN	IOW	ELD	POC	MCH	BRI	MSP; 25	IOW	CHI	LVS	TAL	MAR	TEX	PHO	HOM	70th	19	
2014	DGM Racing	74	Chevy	DAY	MAR; 36	KAN	CLT	DOV	TEX	GTW	KEN	IOW	ELD	POC	MCH	BRI	MSP	CHI	NHA	LVS	TAL					54th	43	
2014	Turner Scott Motorsports	32	Chevy																			MAR; 9	TEX	PHO	HOM	54th	43	

==== Canada Series ====
NASCAR Canada Series results
Year	Team	No.	Make	1	2	3	4	5	6	7	8	9	10	11	12	13	14	NPSC	Pts	Ref
2013	Jacombs Racing	39	Dodge	MSP; 26	DEL; 20	MSP; 17	ICAR; 10	MPS; 10	SAS; 11	ASE; 2	CTR; 20	RIS; 6	MSP; 18	BAR; 5	KWA; 17			10th	368	
2014	Guenette Racing	39	Dodge	MSP	ACD; 6	ICAR; 2	EIR	SAS	ASE; 2	CTR; 7	RIS	MSP	BAR	KWA				17th	161	
2019	Guenette Racing	39	Dodge	MSP	JUK	ACD	TOR	SAS	SAS	EIR	CTR; 11	RIS	MSP	ASE				23rd	107	
2019	22 Racing	18	Chevy												NHA; 7	JUK; 7		23rd	107	
2021	Rick Ware Racing	52	Dodge	SUN; 8	SUN; 6	CTR; 16	ICAR; 5	MSP; 11	MSP; 10	FLA; 8	DEL; 7	DEL; 4	DEL; 18					7th	347	
2022	Dave Jacombs Racing	39	Ford	SUN	MSP	ACD	AVE	TOR; 6	EDM	SAS	SAS	CTR; 1	OSK	ICAR; 3	MSP; 26	DEL		23rd	144	
2023	Ed Hakonson Racing	3	Chevy	SUN; 2	MSP; 7	ACD; 10	AVE; 4	TOR; 8	EIR; 18	SAS; 5	SAS; 6	CTR; 8	OSK; 9	OSK; 11	ICAR; 19	MSP; 12	DEL; 6	7th	493	
2024	22 Racing	39	Chevy	MSP	ACD; 17	AVE	RIS; 3	RIS; 3	OSK	SAS	EIR	CTR; 20	ICAR; 4	MSP	DEL	AMS; 3		13th	214	
2025	JASS Racing	39	Chevy	MSP; 4	RIS	EDM	SAS	CMP; 2	ACD; 12	CTR; 8	ICAR; 5	MSP; 11	DEL	DEL	AMS; 8			10th	259	
2026	JASS Racing with XEMIS Racing	39	Chevy	MSP; 4	ACD; 14	ACD; 14	RIS; 5	AMS; 6	AMS; 21	CMP; 2	EIR	EIR	CTR; 3	MAR; 5	**ICAR**; 1*	MSP; 4	DEL	9th	412	

=== ARCA Racing Series ===
(key) (Bold – Pole position awarded by qualifying time. Italics – Pole position earned by points standings or practice time. * – Most laps led.)

ARCA Racing Series results
Year	Team	No.	Make	1	2	3	4	5	6	7	8	9	10	11	12	13	14	15	16	17	18	19	20	ARSC	Pts	Ref
2014	DGM Racing	17	Chevy	DAY	MOB	SLM	TAL; 20	TOL	NJE	POC	MCH	ELK	WIN	CHI	IRP	POC	BLN	ISF	MAD	DSF	SLM	KEN	KAN	113th	130	

=== CARS Super Late Model Tour ===
(key)

CARS Super Late Model Tour results
Year	Team	No.	Make	1	2	3	4	5	6	7	8	9	10	CSLMTC	Pts	Ref
2016	David Gilliland Racing	98	Toyota	SNM	ROU	HCY; 16	TCM	GRE	ROU	CON	MYB	HCY	SNM	56th	17	

^{*} Season still in progress
^{1} Ineligible for series points
