= Louis-Philippe Dumoulin =

Canadian racing driver (born 1979)

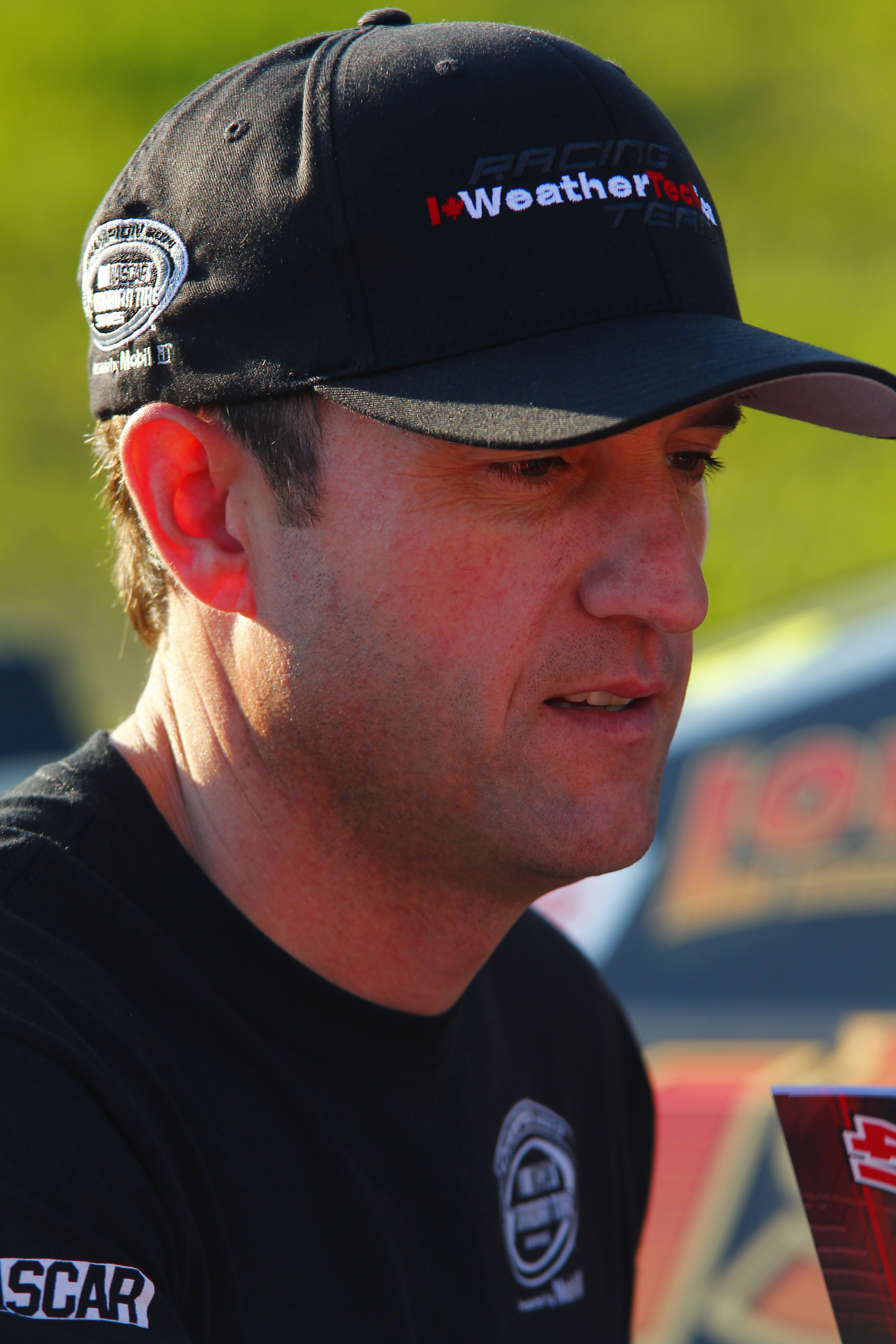
- Born: February 21, 1979 (age 47); Trois-Rivières, Quebec, Canada
- Achievements: 2014, 2018, and 2021 NASCAR Pinty's Series champion

NASCAR O'Reilly Auto Parts Series career
- 2 races run over 2 years
- 2012 position: 95th
- Best finish: 73rd (2011)
- First race: 2011 NAPA Auto Parts 200 Presented by Dodge (Montreal)
- Last race: 2012 NAPA Auto Parts 200 (Montreal)
Wins	Top tens	Poles
0	0	0

NASCAR Canada Series career
- 192 races run over 18 years
- Car no., team: No. 47 (Dumoulin Compétition)
- 2026 position: 2nd
- Best finish: 1st (2014, 2018, 2021)
- First race: 2009 GP3R 100 (Trois-Rivières)
- Last race: 2026 NTN BCA 200 (Delaware)
- First win: 2013 Vortex Brake Pads 200 (Mosport)
- Last win: 2021 Olymel Grand Prix of Ontario (Mosport)
Wins	Top tens	Poles
11	144	7
- Statistics up to date as of September 13, 2026.

Louis-Philippe "L. P." Dumoulin (born February 21, 1979) is a Canadian stock car racing driver. He currently races in the NASCAR Canada Series, driving the No. 47 Dodge owned by Marc-André Bergeron. He won the series championship in 2014, 2018 and 2021.

== Racing career ==
=== NASCAR Xfinity Series ===
Dumoulin ran the Montreal race each in 2011 and 2012. He drove the No. 52 Chevrolet for Means Motorsports in 2011 and the No. 08 Ford for Randy Hill Racing in 2012. He also attempted Watkins Glen with Randy Hill, but did not qualify.

=== NASCAR Pinty's Series ===
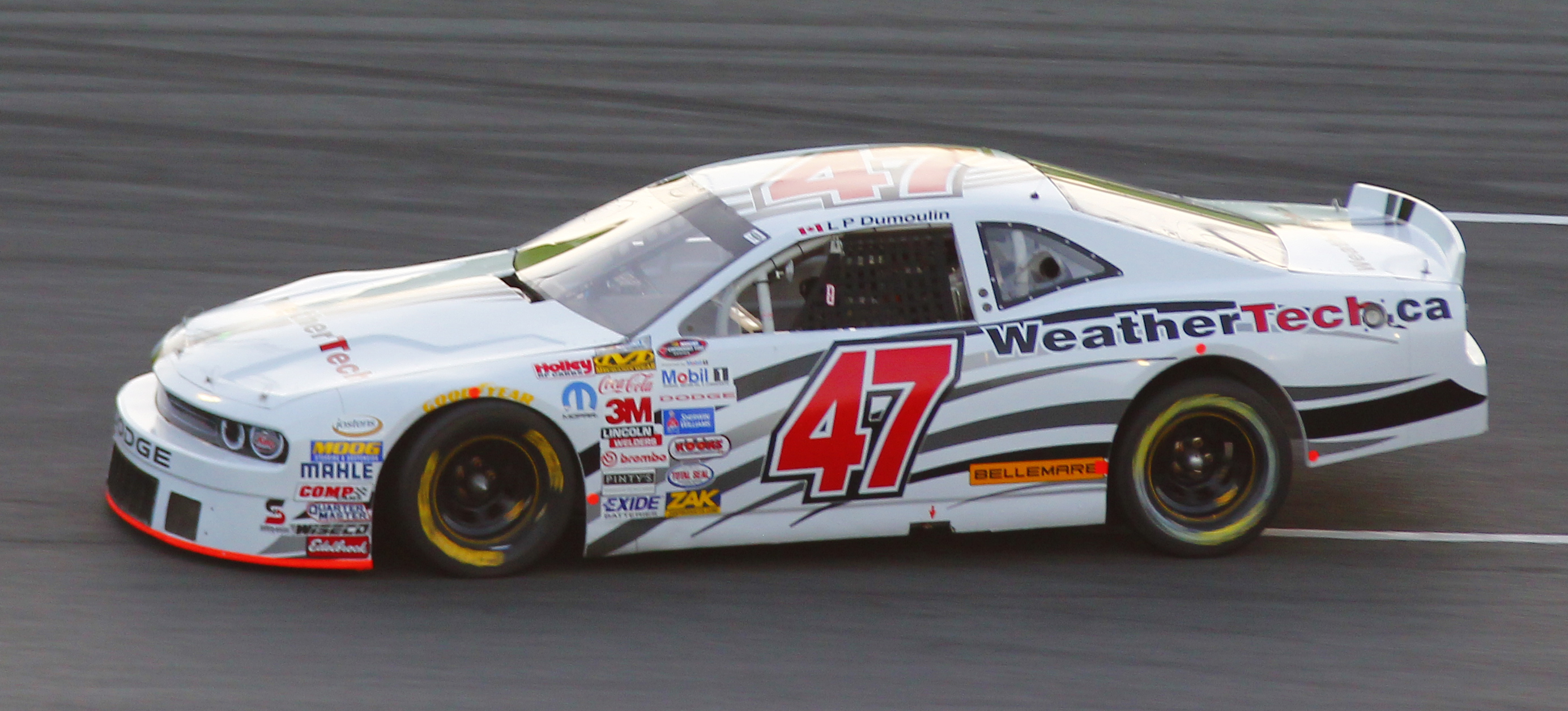
Dumoulin's No. 47 car at Autodrome Chaudière in 2015

Dumoulin has been competing in the Pinty's Series since 2009. He won the championship in 2014, 2018 and 2021. Dumoulin is partnered with WeatherTech Canada and Groupe Bellemare. He has renewed his sponsorship up until the 2021 season.

=== Rolex Grand-Am Sports Car Series ===
Dumoulin has participated in five races over four years in the Rolex Grand-Am Sports Car Series.

== Personal life ==
Dumoulin is the younger brother of the other racing driver: Jean-François Dumoulin. They are both sons of the other competitor: Richard Dumoulin.

== Motorsports career results ==
=== NASCAR ===
(key) (Bold – Pole position awarded by qualifying time. Italics – Pole position earned by points standings or practice time. * – Most laps led.)

==== Nationwide Series ====
NASCAR Nationwide Series results
Year	Team	No.	Make	1	2	3	4	5	6	7	8	9	10	11	12	13	14	15	16	17	18	19	20	21	22	23	24	25	26	27	28	29	30	31	32	33	34	NNSC	Pts	Ref
2011	Means Motorsports	52	Chevy	DAY	PHO	LVS	BRI	CAL	TEX	TAL	NSH	RCH	DAR	DOV	IOW	CLT	CHI	MCH	ROA	DAY	KEN	NHA	NSH	IRP	IOW	GLN	CGV; 28	BRI	ATL	RCH	CHI	DOV	KAN	CLT	TEX	PHO	HOM	73rd	16	
2012	Randy Hill Racing	08	Ford	DAY	PHO	LVS	BRI	CAL	TEX	RCH	TAL	DAR	IOW	CLT	DOV	MCH	ROA	KEN	DAY	NHA	CHI	IND	IOW	GLN; DNQ	CGV; 38	BRI	ATL	RCH	CHI	KEN	DOV	CLT	KAN	TEX	PHO	HOM		95th	6	

==== Canada Series ====
NASCAR Canada Series results
Year	Team	No.	Make	1	2	3	4	5	6	7	8	9	10	11	12	13	14	NCSC	Pts	Ref
2009	Dumoulin Compétition	47	Dodge	ASE	DEL	MSP	ASE	MPS	EDM	SAS	MSP	CTR; 12	CGV; 23	BAR	RIS	KWA		38th	221	
2010	Dumoulin Compétition	47	Dodge	DEL	MSP	ASE	TOR; 21	EDM	MPS	SAS	CTR; 24	MSP	CGV; 24	BAR	RIS	KWA		36th	282	
2011	Dumoulin Compétition	47	Dodge	MSP	ICAR; 4	DEL	MSP; 23	TOR; 7	MPS	SAS	CTR; 5	CGV; 10	BAR; 13	RIS; 17	KWA; 16			13th	1045	
2012	Dumoulin Compétition	47	Dodge	MSP; 5	ICAR; 4	MSP; 12	DEL; 10	MPS; 9	EDM; 20	SAS; 7	**CTR**; 2	CGV; 33	BAR; 11	RIS; 11	KWA; 10			6th	396	
2013	Dumoulin Compétition	47	Dodge	MSP; 1*	DEL; 19	MSP; 7	ICAR; 3	MPS; 5	SAS; 12	ASE; 6	CTR; 14	RIS; 17	MSP; 1	BAR; 16	KWA; 21			5th	418	
2014	Dumoulin Compétition	47	Dodge	MSP; 4	ACD; 5	ICAR; 3	EIR; 2	SAS; 1	ASE; 3	CTR; 1*	RIS; 6	MSP; 4	BAR; 4	KWA; 9				1st	453	
2015	Dumoulin Compétition	47	Dodge	MSP; 6	ACD; 10	SSS; 10	ICAR; 4	EIR; 2	SAS; 13	ASE; 4	CTR; 5	RIS; 7	MSP; 2	KWA; 4				4th	420	
2016	Dumoulin Compétition	47	Dodge	MSP; 12	SSS; 12	ACD; 11	ICAR; 13	TOR; 4	EIR; 2	SAS; 2	CTR; 8	RIS; 2	MSP; 2	ASE; 14	KWA; 5			5th	443	
2017	Dumoulin Compétition	47	Dodge	MSP; 6	DEL; 4	ACD; 3	ICAR; 14	TOR; 2	SAS; 6	SAS; 5	EIR; 5	CTR; 4	RIS; 14	MSP; 5	ASE; 5	JUK; 3		4th	497	
2018	Dumoulin Compétition	47	Dodge	MSP; 1	JUK; 7	**ACD**; 2*	TOR; 5	SAS; 16	**SAS**; 2*	EIR; 1	CTR; 2	**RIS**; 1*	**MSP**; 3	ASE; 10	NHA; 8	JUK; 10		1st	523	
2019	Dumoulin Compétition	47	Dodge	MSP; 4	JUK; 4	ACD; 15	TOR; 3	**SAS**; 1	SAS; 4	EIR; 3	CTR; 1	RIS; 4	MSP; 13	ASE; 7	NHA; 9	JUK; 10		3rd	505	
2020	Dumoulin Compétition	47	Dodge	SUN; 1	SUN; 13	FLA; 7	FLA; 5	JUK; 3	JUK; 9									4th	231	
2021	Dumoulin Compétition	47	Dodge	SUN; 6	SUN; 3	CTR; 5	ICAR; 3	MSP; 1	MSP; 11	FLA; 7	DEL; 8	DEL; 6	DEL; 6					1st	389	
2022	Dumoulin Compétition	47	Dodge	SUN; 9	MSP; 7	**ACD**; 4	AVE; 19	TOR; 3	EDM; 4	SAS; 8	SAS; 3	CTR; 14	OSK; 18	ICAR; 6	MSP; 4	DEL; 8		7th	468	
2023	Dumoulin Compétition	47	Dodge	SUN; 7	MSP; 5	ACD; 5	AVE; 8	TOR; 4	EIR; 3	SAS; 18	SAS; 3	CTR; 2	OSK; 16	OSK; 6	ICAR; 5	**MSP**; 2	DEL; 14	4th	520	
2024	Dumoulin Compétition	47	Dodge	MSP; 3	ACD; 4	AVE; 5	RIS; 8	RIS; 4	OSK; 12	SAS; 4	EIR; 10	CTR; 4	ICAR; 23	MSP; 23	DEL; 5	AMS; 8		5th	461	
2025	Dumoulin Compétition	47	Dodge	MSP; 5	RIS; 8	EDM; 10	SAS; 3	CMP; 3	ACD; 13	CTR; 3	ICAR; 16	MSP; 8	DEL; 11	DEL; 13	AMS; 13			5th	422	
2026	Dumoulin Compétition	47	Dodge	MSP; 2	ACD; 16	ACD; 8	RIS; 3	AMS; 8	AMS; 9	CMP; 7	EIR; 5	EIR; 5	CTR; 2	MAR; 3	ICAR; 7	MSP; 5	DEL; 6	2nd	534	

^{*} Season still in progress
^{1} Ineligible for series points
