= Go Fas Racing =

Stock car racing team

- Owner: Archie St. Hilaire
- Base: Mooresville, North Carolina
- Series: NASCAR Cup Series
- Manufacturer: Ford
- Opened: 2011

Career
- Debut: 2011 Daytona 500 (Daytona)
- Latest race: 2020 Season Finale 500 (Phoenix)
- Races competed: 409
- Drivers' Championships: 0
- Race victories: 0
- Pole positions: 0

Go Fas Racing (doing business as Circle Sport-Go Fas Racing LLC, and often stylized as Go FAS Racing) is an American professional stock car racing team that competes in the ASA STARS National Tour,, the zMax CARS Tour and formerly in the NASCAR Cup Series. Founded by long-time crew chief Frank Allen Stoddard as FAS Lane Racing, it merged with Archie St. Hilaire's Go Green Racing in 2014. The team's last NASCAR Cup Series entry was the No. 32 Ford Mustang GT for Corey LaJoie. As of 2024, they compete in big late model events around the country with drivers Caden Kvapil and Brandon Barker, as well as sponsoring the ASA STARS National Tour's Go FAS Racing Pole Award.

== History ==
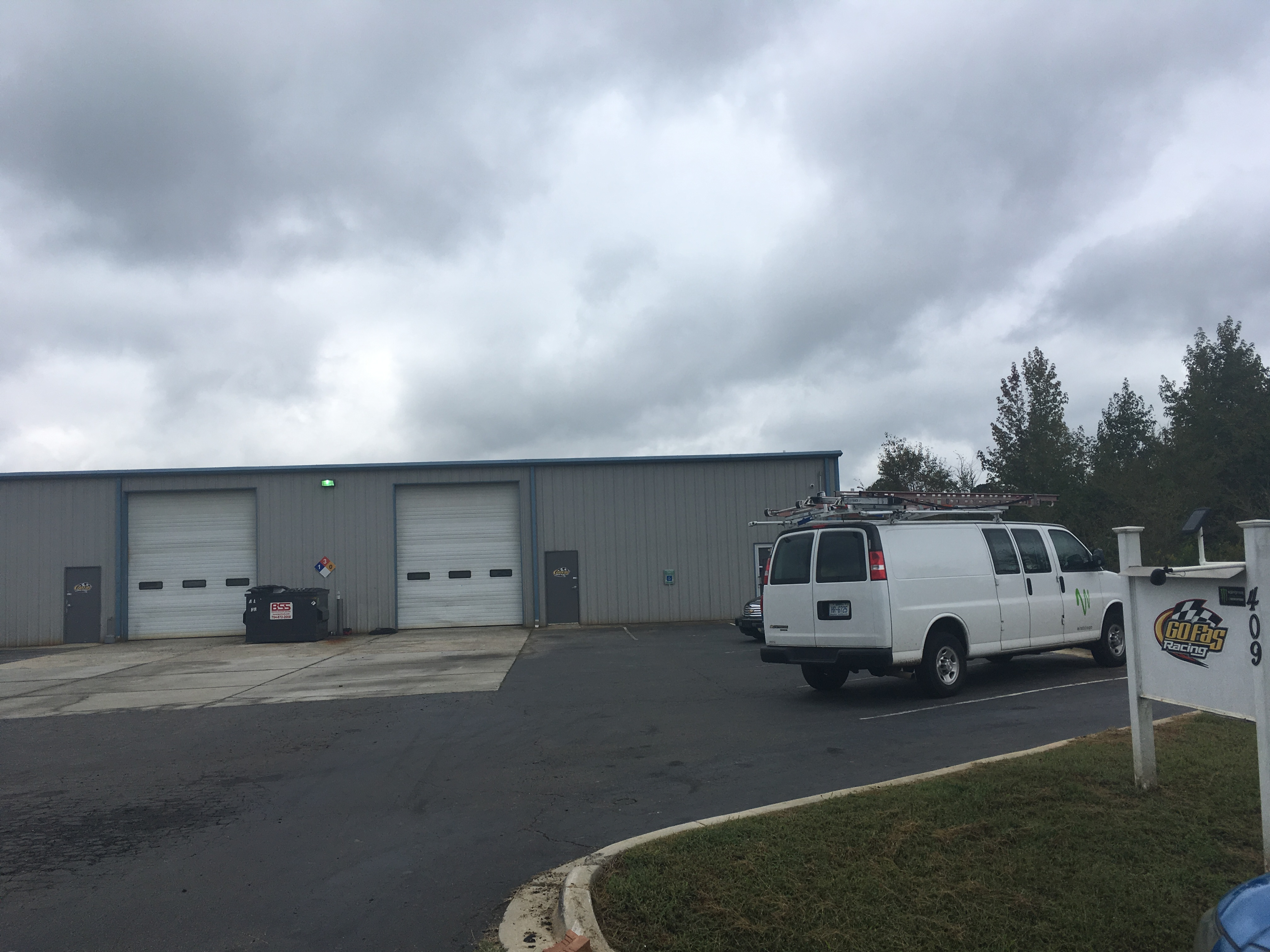
The Go Fas Racing race shop in Mooresville, North Carolina

FAS Lane Racing was established in 2011 when Stoddard's old team, Latitude 43 Motorsports, closed its doors. Stoddard then formed his own team with the remaining crew members, purchasing cars and equipment from Mark Simo and Boris Said's No Fear Racing as well as from Richard Petty Motorsports, Roush Fenway Racing and his old Latitude 43 team. FAS represents Stoddard's initials (Francis Allen Stoddard), and Stoddard chose the number 32 in tribute to his racing mentor Stub Fadden, who was a Busch North Series racer from New England.

In 2014, after a few years of struggling with team ownership, Stoddard merged the team with Archie St. Hilaire's Go Green Racing, forming Go Fas Racing. By 2017, the primary team owner was St. Hilaire with Stoddard as the team consultant and Mason St. Hilaire as the general manager.

In 2018, the team partnered with Circle Sport owner Joe Falk to use his charter on the #32, while the charter used on that car for the prior two seasons being sent to Wood Brothers Racing in a partnership with Go FAS.

On October 22, 2020, majority owner Archie St. Hilaire and team manager Mason St. Hilaire announced that they had sold their stake in GFR's charter to an undisclosed buyer, later revealed to be B. J. McLeod and Matt Tifft for Live Fast Motorsports. They also announced that GFR would exit full-time competition at the end of 2020 and run only a handful of Cup races in 2021. However, the team closed up shop soon afterwards, after not securing the sponsorship for more races.

== Cup Series ==
=== Car No. 32 history ===
Early years (2011–2013)

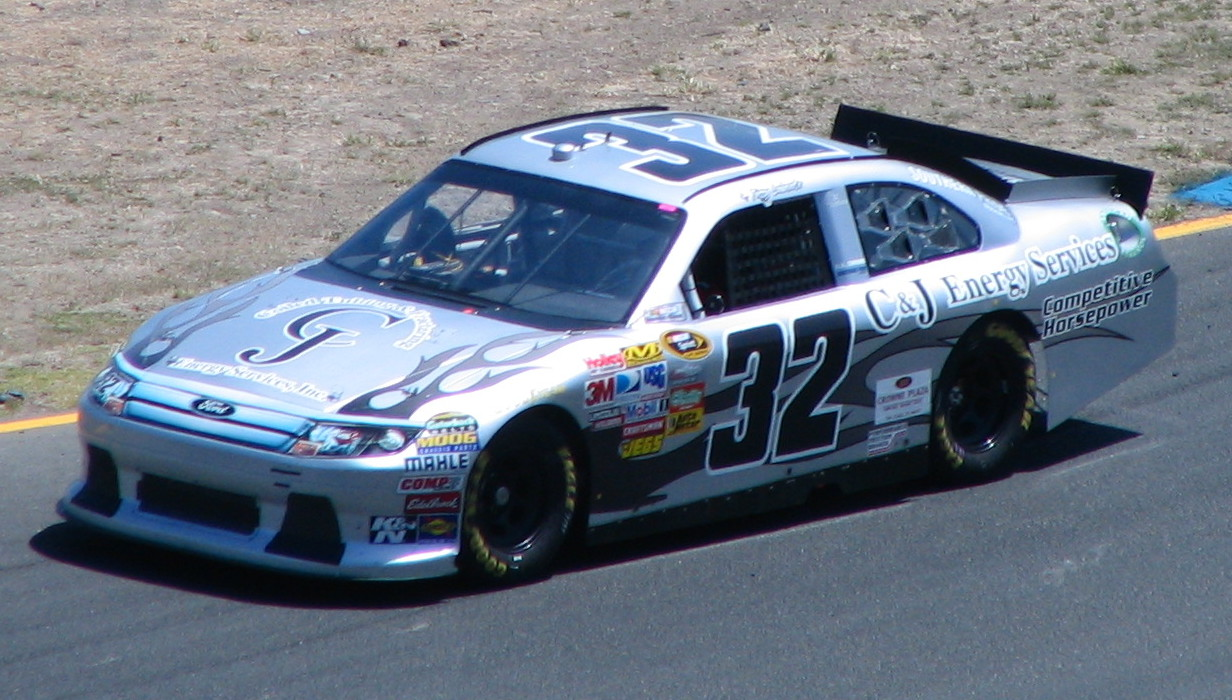
Terry Labonte in the No. 32 at 2011 Toyota/Save Mart 350

With Stoddard serving as both owner and crew chief, the team began with Cup Champion Terry Labonte at Daytona 500, finishing a solid 15th. Veteran Mike Skinner would run the next two races. After Ken Schrader finished 33rd at Auto Club, the team became locked into the Top 35 in owner points despite failing to make Bristol with Schrader. Schrader also drove the car to a 22nd-place finish at Martinsville. The team also ran the full race at Texas with Big Red and finished 33rd. Talladega saw a change where they brought back Terry Labonte and Texas-based company C&J Energy as the sponsor. They were upfront a couple of laps with J. J. Yeley drafting with them, but the engine let go to a 34th-place finish. The team has had multiple sponsors including VA Mortgage Centers, U.S. Chrome and Big Red. FAS Lane Racing also gave 2 drivers their Sprint Cup debuts this year. Jason White was one. White ran the No. 32 GunBroker.com Ford at Pocono Raceway. He started 41st and finished 33rd. Andrew Ranger was the other. Ranger, the young Canadian from Quebec is a former NASCAR Canadian Tire Series champion. His debut came at Watkins Glen International in the Bully Hill Vineyards Ford where he started and finished 35th. His debut was cut short about 15 laps early with transmission failures. The team finished 34th in owners' points, guaranteeing the team a start in the first five races of 2012; the team later sold the owner's points to Michael Waltrip Racing in 2012 to allow Mark Martin to compete in the Daytona 500, with Labonte taking advantage of the past champion's provisional.

For 2012, FAS Lane Racing ran full-time in 2012 with Terry Labonte running 4 races with C&J Energy as the sponsor, Mike Bliss running 7 races with U.S. Chrome and Air National Guard as the sponsors, Ken Schrader running in 9 races with Federated Auto Parts as the sponsor, Boris Said running in 2 races, Reed Sorenson in select races, and other select drivers and sponsors for the remaining 13 races. After the Daytona 500, FAS Lane acquired the points from the No. 6 Roush Fenway Racing team. Ken Schrader drove in at least 9 2012 races with sponsorship from Federated Auto Parts. Also, Boris Said ran the No. 32 HendrickCars.com car at Sonoma and Watkins Glen. Jason White, Timmy Hill, T. J. Bell, and two-time K&N Pro Series East champion Mike Olsen also raced in the No. 32.

FAS Lane Racing used a variety of drivers for 2013, with Schrader, Hill, Said, and Labonte racing. On January 30, 2013, Hill declared his intention to run against Danica Patrick and Ricky Stenhouse Jr. for Sprint Cup Rookie of the Year honors.

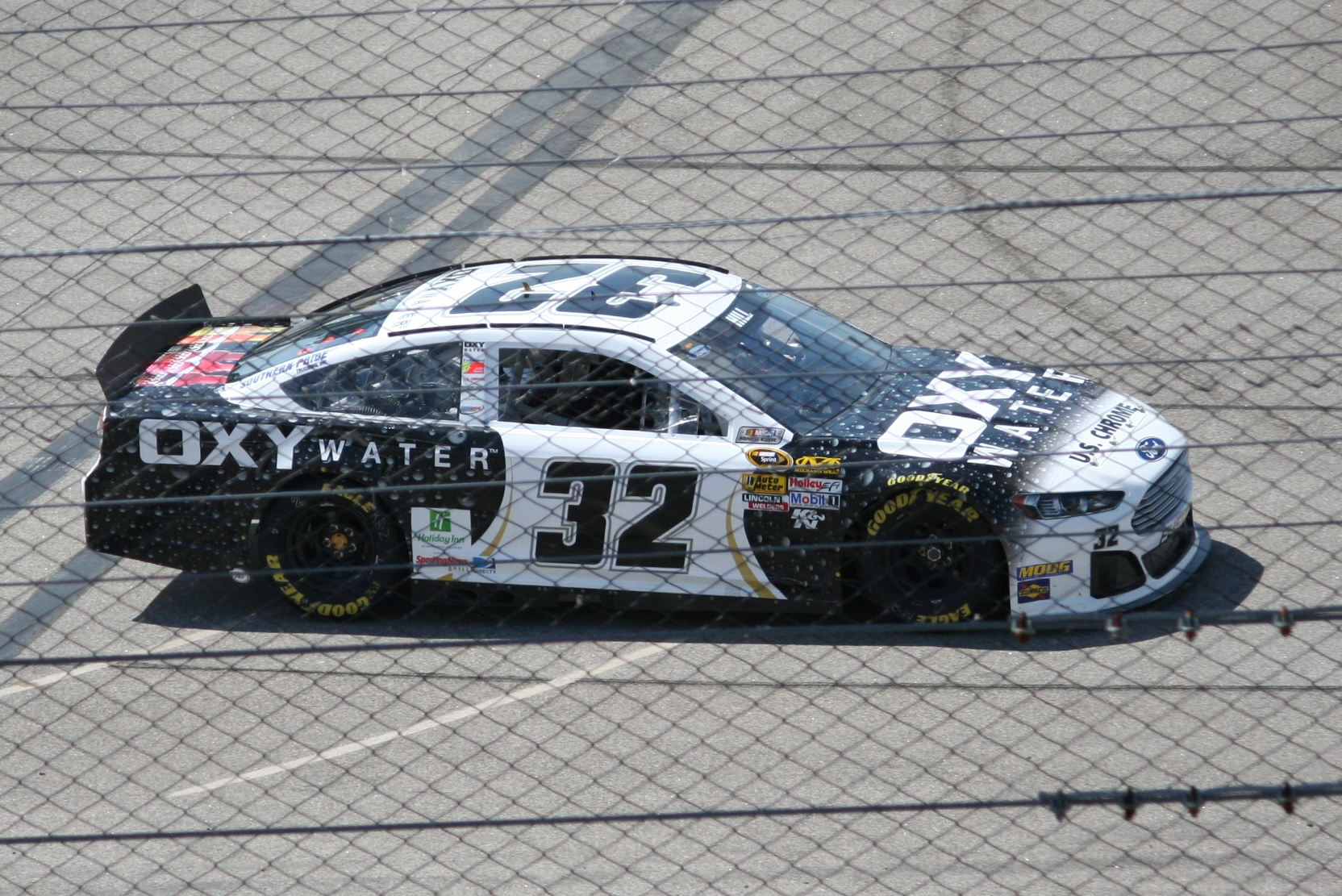
The No. 32 driven by Timmy Hill at Richmond International Raceway in 2013

OXYwater scandal (2013)

The team had announced in March a 24-race sponsor for 2013, beginning at Bristol with Terry Labonte; this also included the full 2014 and 2015 seasons. However, OXY Water was being investigated by the IRS for intending to deceive their investors by misappropriating over $2 million in invested funds. The company was forced to file bankruptcy, costing investors over $9 million., and did not appear as a primary sponsor after Indianapolis.

Merger with Go Green Racing (2014–2016)

In December 2013, fellow Ford team Go Green Racing and FAS Lane Racing merged in 2014, thus creating Go Fas Racing. The team continued to operate out of the FAS Lane Racing shop. Terry Labonte ran the 2014 Daytona 500, and the other super speedway events in his final season, with Said running the road courses, and Kvapil running the balance of the schedule. Blake Koch was later placed in the 32 for the Sprint Showdown, the Coca-Cola 600 and Dover. K&N Pro Series East driver Eddie MacDonald was hired to run the No. 32 at Loudon. J. J. Yeley also ran a number of races in the 32. Joey Gase made his debut with the team at Chicagoland. Kyle Fowler made also made his Cup debut with the team, this time at Martinsville.

With Terry Labonte, Go Fas Racing had its best team finish, 11th at the rain-shortened 2014 Coke Zero 400. The same year, Terry announced his retirement from NASCAR. His last race was the 2014 GEICO 500 at Talladega, where the sides of the 32 were painted similar to the Kellogg's Corn Flakes car he drove to the 1996 championship season, while the roof was painted to replicate the car Labonte debuted in the series in 1978. The 32 originally had the right side painted in the Piedmont Airlines colors he used in his 1984 championship season, but NASCAR would not allow it because the left and right sides must be identical.

For the 2015 season, Terry's brother and 2000 Champion Bobby Labonte ran the four superspeedway events, also with C&J Energy Services, and Boris Said returned for the two road courses, with the remainder of the lineup to be determined. Go Fas planned to use Mike Bliss as the primary driver for the rest of the schedule, although a variety of drivers will run the car like in prior seasons.

At Las Vegas, Bliss would suffer the first DNQ for the team since 2011. He went on to DNQ a few weeks later at Charlotte. His last race for the team was at Michigan in June. His best finish with Go Fas Racing was 31st, twice.

Joey Gase was in the car for four races, failing to make Texas in November, Will Kimmel ran at Kentucky and Kansas, Travis Kvapil returning for the two Pocono races and Eddie MacDonald in Loudon. Josh Wise attempted the race at Indianapolis, but did not qualify. Despite this, and due to a prior association with Go Green Racing in the Xfinity Series, he was brought back for a three-race stretch beginning at Michigan. A few weeks later at Darlington, Wise failed to qualify again. Wise attempted four more races after this, including a DNQ at Charlotte. Jeffrey Earnhardt made his Sprint Cup debut at Richmond, running the full race and finishing 40th, 13 laps behind the leaders. He returned at New Hampshire two weeks later. Fowler would return at Martinsville. The team would finish 42nd in the owner points, down noticeably from their 38th place showing the year before; they were the highest-ranked full-time team to trail the part-time No. 21 by season's end.

For 2016, Earnhardt and Labonte plan to split the ride. Earnhardt will run the majority of the season for Sprint Cup Rookie of the Year honors, while Labonte will run the restrictor-plate races. The team is also one of the 36 "charter" teams, thus unlike in 2015, the team will make every race.

After Labonte and Earnhardt split driving the No. 32 in the first 4 races. Gase returned to the No. 32 for the Good Sam 500. On April 22, the team announced that former CART series competitor and road course ringer, Patrick Carpentier would drive for the team at Sonoma and Indianapolis. In June, the team hired Jeb Burton to drive at Pocono. Eddie MacDonald drove 1 single race at New Hampshire and Boris Said made his first Cup series start for the season at the Cheez-It 355 at The Glen in New York. Dylan Lupton joined the team late to drive the No. 32 at Homestead.

Matt DiBenedetto (2017–2018)

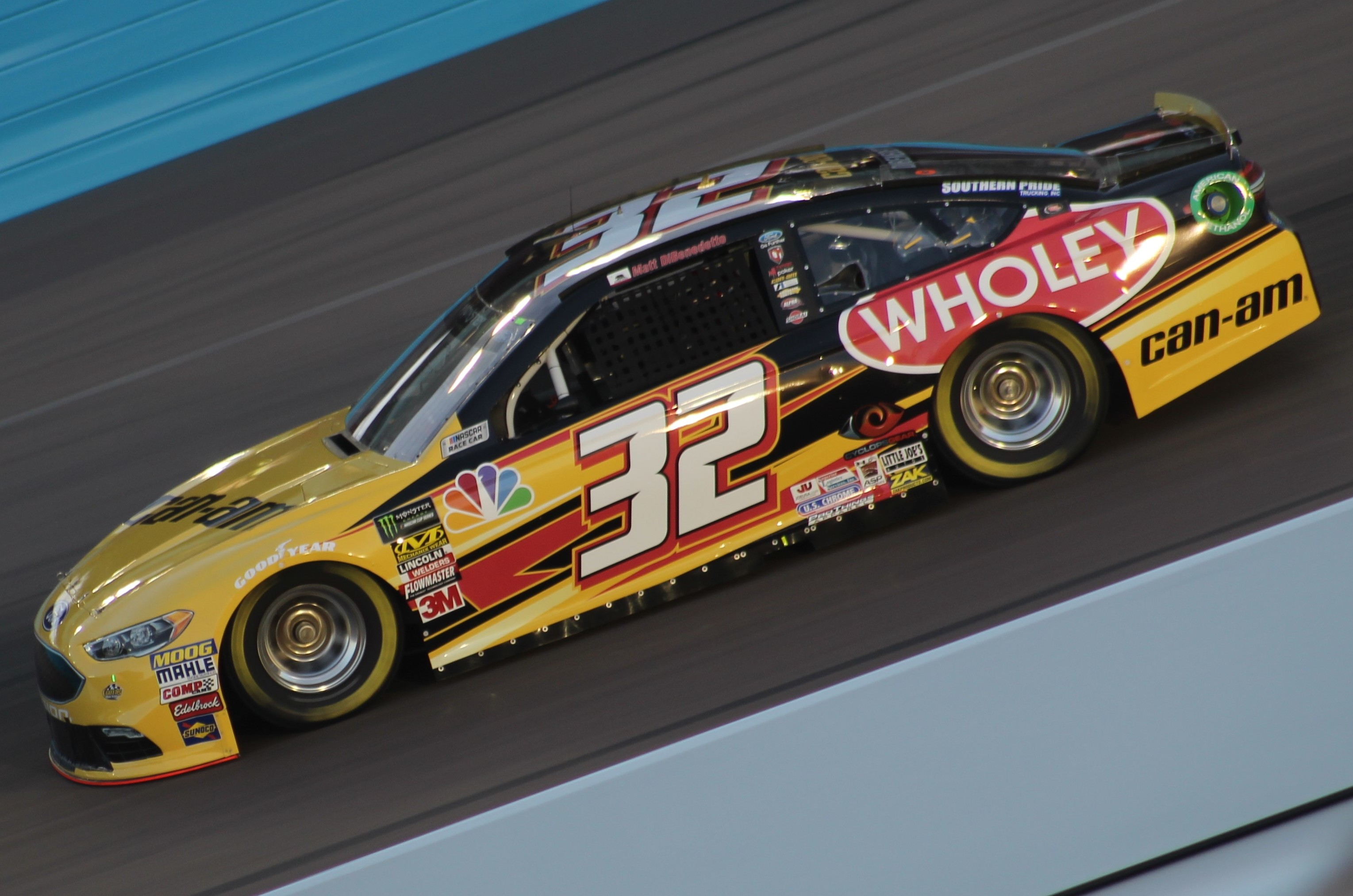
Matt DiBenedetto in the No. 32 during the 2018 Can-Am 500

After the season ended, it was announced that Earnhardt, Labonte, Gase, Burton, MacDonald, Carpentier, Lupton, and Said will not return to Go Fas Racing in 2017, with the team planning to have one single driver in the 32 in 2017. The driver was announced to be Matt DiBenedetto on December 15. Go Fas Racing also announced soon afterward that they would loan their charter to Wood Brothers Racing's No. 21 driven by Ryan Blaney, as they had purchased the No. 44 team owned by Richard Petty Motorsports, including the No. 44 charter.

Go Fas Racing picked up their first top ten at the 2017 Daytona 500 with a 9th-place finish by DiBenedetto. This was bettered with an 8th-place finish at the 2017 Brickyard 400, as they were able to avoid being in any of the race's record 14 cautions. DiBenedetto finished a then-career-best 32nd in points while Go Fas went from a bottom 5 team to a mid-pack team while concentrating on one driver the whole year.

In January 2018, it was announced that Go Fas Racing would sell its charter to the Wood Brothers, in exchange for manufacturer support. Under NASCAR rules, Go Fas was still listed as an owner of the charter. At the same time, Go Fas Racing partnered with Circle Sport to field the No. 32 Ford with the No. 33 charter. DiBenedetto and Go Fas renewed and started with crew chief Gene Nead for 2 races before Go Fas Racing and Nead mutually parted ways. Randy Cox is now the crew chief for the 32 team starting at the 2018 Pennzoil 400. On June 24, at the 2018 Toyota/Save Mart 350 DiBenedetto picked up a 17th-place finish for Go Fas Racing making it the team's highest finish ever at a road course. Two weeks later on July 7, at the 2018 Coke Zero Sugar 400 Go Fas Racing bettered their previous best with a 7th-place finish.

On September 7, 2018, DiBenedetto announced his intentions to leave the team concluding the 2018 season, eventually announcing a deal to drive for Leavine Family Racing in 2019.

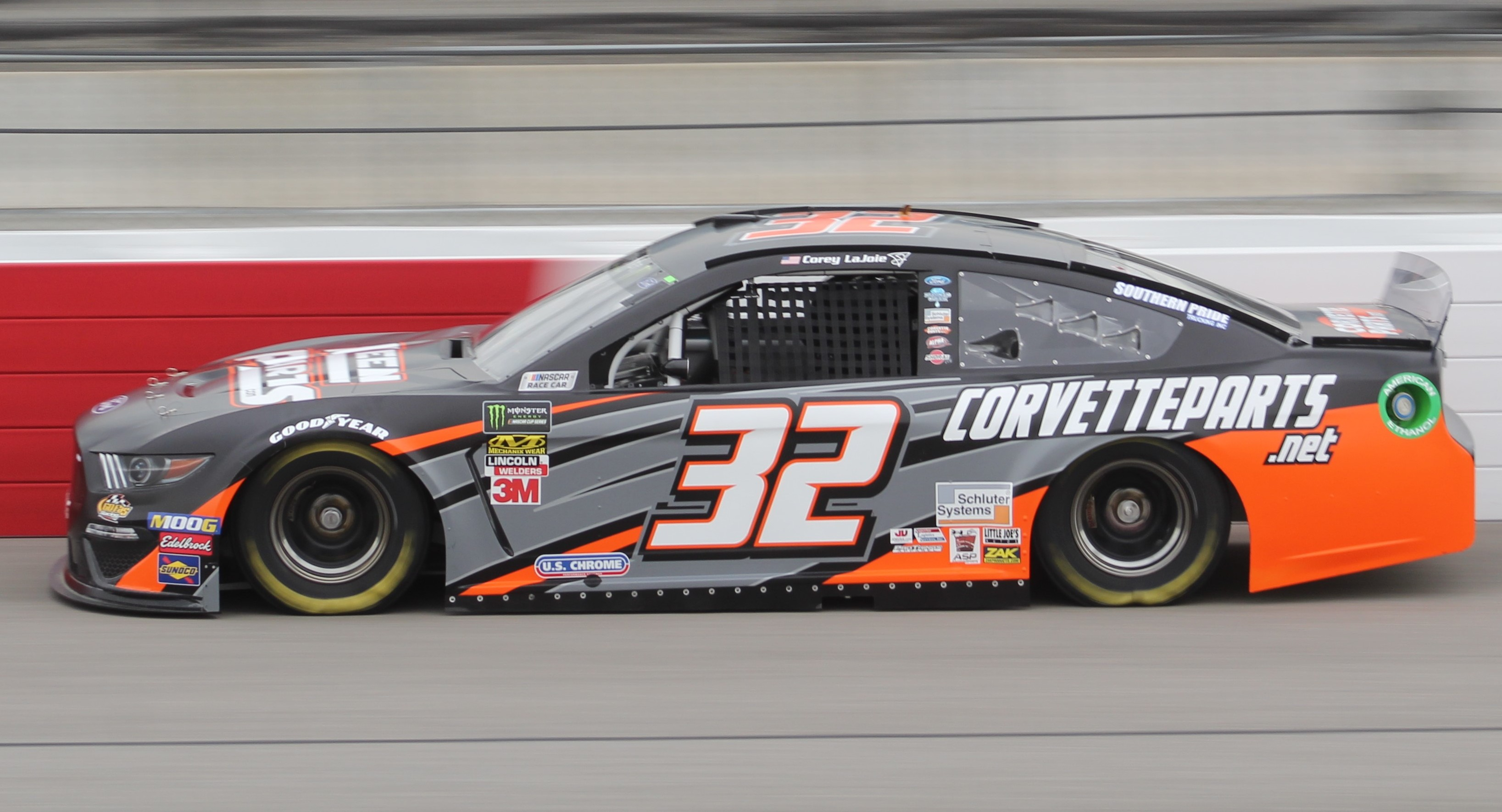
Corey LaJoie in the No. 32 at Richmond Raceway in 2019

Corey LaJoie (2019–2020)

In December 2018, it was reported that Corey LaJoie would be joining Go Fas Racing in the 2019 season. Finally on December 20, 2018, it was announced that he would be their full-time driver along with new sponsor Schluter Systems. It was also announced that Go Fas Racing would be partnering with Team Penske to use one of their pit crews. It was also announced that longtime sponsor of GFR, Can-Am would also depart the team, thus leaving a bunch of scheduled races unsponsored.

For the 2019 Daytona 500, Go Fas Racing made headlines by placing a picture of LaJoie's face on the No. 32 car as part of Old Spice's sponsorship. LaJoie finished 18th after blowing a right-front tire just 20 laps into the race.

Statistically speaking, LaJoie has been Go Fas Racing's greatest driver in the team's history, having picked up numerous top-twenty finishes, top-15 finishes, plus a top-ten, in over 20 starts. On August 21, 2020, it was confirmed that Corey LaJoie would not be returning to the No. 32 car in 2021.

Part-time (2021)

It was announced on October 22, 2020 that the team planned to reduce to a part-time schedule starting in 2021, with St. Hilaire anticipating that the team would run in 5-6 races in the upcoming season. St. Hilaire, in defending his decision to move to a part-time schedule, said that his family was expecting a grand-baby, and longtime manager Mason St. Hilaire was moving on to a different industry. St. Hilaire sold his share of the Go Fas Racing charter to B. J. McLeod and Matt Tifft, who would use it in 2021 for a full-time operation with Joe Falk as Live Fast Motorsports.

After not running a single race for the first 35 races of 2021, it was confirmed in an interview with B. J. McLeod that the team has since ceased operations.

==== Car No. 32 results ====
NASCAR Cup Series results
Year	Driver	No.	Make	1	2	3	4	5	6	7	8	9	10	11	12	13	14	15	16	17	18	19	20	21	22	23	24	25	26	27	28	29	30	31	32	33	34	35	36	Owners	Pts
2011	Terry Labonte	32	Ford	DAY; 15							TAL; 34								SON; 32	DAY; 28							BRI; 33								TAL; 34					34th	499
2011	Mike Skinner	32	Ford		PHO; 24	LVS; 29																																		34th	499
2011	Ken Schrader	32	Ford				BRI; DNQ	CAL; 33	MAR; 22	TEX; 33		RCH; 32	DAR; 28													MCH; 30										MAR; 21				34th	499
2011	Mike Bliss	32	Ford											DOV; 25	CLT; 30		POC; 31	MCH; 32			KEN; 34	NHA; 32	IND; 32					ATL; 26	RCH; 36	CHI; 25	NHA; 31	DOV; 36	KAN; 28	CLT; 30			TEX; 34	PHO; 30		34th	499
2011	Patrick Carpentier	32	Ford													KAN; 30																								34th	499
2011	Jason White	32	Ford																					POC; 33																34th	499
2011	Andrew Ranger	32	Ford																						GLN; 35															34th	499
2011	T. J. Bell	32	Ford																																				HOM; 29	34th	499
2012	Terry Labonte	32	Ford	DAY; 18									TAL; 29								DAY; 20												TAL; 16							34th	493
2012	Mike Bliss	32	Ford		PHO; 24																																			34th	493
2012	Ken Schrader	32	Ford			LVS; 30	BRI; 33	CAL; 34	MAR; 32									MCH; 31		KEN; 31		NHA; 31	IND; 30				BRI; 42		RCH; 35							MAR; 29	TEX; 31		HOM; 37	34th	493
2012	Reed Sorenson	32	Ford							TEX; 32	KAN; 28	RCH; 34		DAR; 30		DOV; 30	POC; 41																							34th	493
2012	T. J. Bell	32	Ford												CLT; 31											MCH; 33		ATL; 30		CHI; 30		DOV; 33								34th	493
2012	Boris Said	32	Ford																SON; 29						GLN; 25															34th	493
2012	Jason White	32	Ford																					POC; 31																34th	493
2012	Mike Olsen	32	Ford																												NHA; 33									34th	493
2012	Timmy Hill	32	Ford																															CLT; 36	KAN; 22			PHO; 29		34th	493
2013	Terry Labonte	32	Ford	DAY; 26			BRI; 25						TAL; 29								DAY; 20														TAL; 35					37th	443
2013	Ken Schrader	32	Ford		PHO; 34	LVS; 37			MAR; 32									MCH; 34		KEN; 29		NHA; 30					BRI; 27		RCH; 37							MAR; 28			HOM; 34	37th	443
2013	Timmy Hill	32	Ford					CAL; 39		TEX; 36	KAN; 33	RCH; 34		DAR; 33	CLT; 27	DOV; 35	POC; 35						IND; 42	POC; 27		MCH; 29		ATL; 31		CHI; 34	NHA; 36	DOV; 36	KAN; 28	CLT; 36			TEX; 41	PHO; 34		37th	443
2013	Boris Said	32	Ford																SON; 18						GLN; 22															37th	443
2014	Terry Labonte	32	Ford	DAY; 20									TAL; 24								DAY; 11														TAL; 33					38th	394
2014	Travis Kvapil	32	Ford		PHO; 38	LVS; 39	BRI; 33	CAL; 33	MAR; 33	TEX; 37	DAR; 33	RCH; 36		KAN; 34			POC; 29	MCH; 43		KEN; 34			IND; 39	POC; 25		MCH; 32			RCH; 39											38th	394
2014	Blake Koch	32	Ford												CLT; 35	DOV; 30																		CLT; 39					HOM; 38	38th	394
2014	Boris Said	32	Ford																SON; 35						GLN; 25															38th	394
2014	Eddie MacDonald	32	Ford																			NHA; 35																		38th	394
2014	J. J. Yeley	32	Ford																								BRI; 33	ATL; 32				DOV; 39								38th	394
2014	Joey Gase	32	Ford																											CHI; 37			KAN; 37				TEX; 37	PHO; 33		38th	394
2014	Timmy Hill	32	Ford																												NHA; 35									38th	394
2014	Kyle Fowler	32	Ford																																	MAR; 28				38th	394
2015	Bobby Labonte	32	Ford	DAY; 24									TAL; 27							DAY; 43															TAL; 23					42nd	268
2015	Mike Bliss	32	Ford		ATL; 31	LVS; DNQ	PHO; 33	CAL; 40	MAR; 34	TEX; 36	BRI; 31				CLT; DNQ	DOV; 35		MCH; 40																						42nd	268
2015	Joey Gase	32	Ford									RCH; 43		KAN; 38																							TEX; DNQ	PHO; 42		42nd	268
2015	Travis Kvapil	32	Ford														POC; 35							POC; 32																42nd	268
2015	Boris Said	32	Ford																SON; 26						GLN; 32															42nd	268
2015	Will Kimmel	32	Ford																		KEN; 38													KAN; 39						42nd	268
2015	Eddie MacDonald	32	Ford																			NHA; 37																		42nd	268
2015	Josh Wise	32	Ford																				IND; DNQ			MCH; 37	BRI; 35	DAR; DNQ		CHI; 33		DOV; 36	CLT; DNQ						HOM; 39	42nd	268
2015	Jeffrey Earnhardt	32	Ford																										RCH; 40		NHA; 35									42nd	268
2015	Kyle Fowler	32	Ford																																	MAR; 41				42nd	268
2016	Bobby Labonte	32	Ford	DAY; 31									TAL; 19							DAY; 24															TAL; 31					38th	281
2016	Jeffrey Earnhardt	32	Ford		ATL; 38	LVS; 33		CAL; 34		TEX; 35	BRI; 32	RCH; 38			DOV; 35	CLT; 39		MCH; 37			KEN; 28					BRI; 29	MCH; 37	DAR; 38	RCH; 27		NHA; 37	DOV; 36	CLT; 26			MAR; 33		PHO; 33		38th	281
2016	Joey Gase	32	Ford				PHO; 32		MAR; 36					KAN; 34																CHI; 40				KAN; 35			TEX; 36			38th	281
2016	Jeb Burton	32	Ford														POC; 29							POC; 36																38th	281
2016	Patrick Carpentier	32	Ford																SON; 37				IND; 34																	38th	281
2016	Eddie MacDonald	32	Ford																			NHA; 36																		38th	281
2016	Boris Said	32	Ford																						GLN; 24															38th	281
2016	Dylan Lupton	32	Ford																																				HOM; 39	38th	281
2017	Matt DiBenedetto	32	Ford	DAY; 9	ATL; 28	LVS; 26	PHO; 29	CAL; 29	MAR; 35	TEX; 31	BRI; 19	RCH; 28	TAL; 18	KAN; 32	CLT; 37	DOV; 29	POC; 32	MCH; 28	SON; 23	DAY; 13	KEN; 25	NHA; 30	IND; 8	POC; 37	GLN; 28	MCH; 26	BRI; 26	DAR; 27	RCH; 31	CHI; 31	NHA; 31	DOV; 31	CLT; 23	TAL; 31	KAN; 22	MAR; 39	TEX; 25	PHO; 27	HOM; 30	32nd	363
2018	Matt DiBenedetto	32	Ford	DAY; 27	ATL; 31	LVS; 22	PHO; 25	CAL; 31	MAR; 32	TEX; 16	BRI; 21	RCH; 16	TAL; 19	DOV; 29	KAN; 22	CLT; 37	POC; 37	MCH; 36	SON; 17	CHI; 29	DAY; 7	KEN; 37	NHA; 28	POC; 27	GLN; 33	MCH; 24	BRI; 22	DAR; 38	IND; 36	LVS; 24	RCH; 34	CLT; 13	DOV; 27	TAL; 30	KAN; 23	MAR; 36	TEX; 38	PHO; 21	HOM; 26	31st	368
2019	Corey LaJoie	32	Ford	DAY; 18	ATL; 29	LVS; 27	PHO; 26	CAL; 31	MAR; 33	TEX; 28	BRI; 34	RCH; 26	TAL; 11	DOV; 29	KAN; 22	CLT; 12	POC; 36	MCH; 23	SON; 32	CHI; 30	DAY; 6	KEN; 28	NHA; 23	POC; 26	GLN; 34	MCH; 21	BRI; 24	DAR; 36	IND; 19	LVS; 28	RCH; 29	CLT; 27	DOV; 28	TAL; 7	KAN; 28	MAR; 18	TEX; 38	PHO; 35	HOM; 31	30th	401
2020	Corey LaJoie	32	Ford	DAY; 8	LVS; 16	CAL; 29	PHO; 27	DAR; 31	DAR; 24	CLT; 23	CLT; 19	BRI; 32	ATL; 27	MAR; 18	HOM; 29	TAL; 16	POC; 23	POC; 21	IND; 39	KEN; 28	TEX; 16	KAN; 21	NHA; 35	MCH; 22	MCH; 22	DAY; 32	DOV; 29	DOV; 23	DAY; 21	DAR; 37	RCH; 27	BRI; 33	LVS; 27	TAL; 28	CLT; 27	KAN; 23	TEX; 25	MAR; 25	PHO; 38	30th	408

== Whelen Euro Series ==
Go Fas Racing (Euro)
- Owner(s): Archie St. Hilaire; Alain Lord Munir
- Series: NASCAR Whelen Euro Series
- Race drivers: Romain Iannetta; Florian Venturi; Jacques Villeneuve
- Manufacturer: Chevrolet
- Opened: 2018
- Closed: 2019

Career
- Races competed: 43
- Drivers' Championships: 0
- Race victories: 3
- Pole positions: 7

=== Car No. 32 history ===
Go Fas Racing debuted a new NASCAR Whelen Euro Series team in 2018. With Romain Iannetta in the No. 32 Elite 1, and Florian Venturi in the Elite 2 Ford Mustang. After scoring 2 wins and a pole in Go Fas' first season in the Euro Series, it was announced they would be coming back with Jacques Villeneuve behind the wheel of the No. 32 Elite 1, while Florian Venturi stays as the team's Elite 2 driver for 2019.

==== Car No. 32 results – Elite 1 ====
NASCAR Whelen Euro Series – Elite 1 results
Year	Driver	No.	Make	1	2	3	4	5	6	7	8	9	10	11	12	13	NWES	Pts
2018	Romain Iannetta	32	Ford	VAL; 12	VAL; 6	FRA; 26	FRA; 27	BRH; 20	BRH; 9	TOU; 16	TOU; 3	HOC; 12	HOC; 23	ZOL; 22	ZOL; 11		10th	347
2019	Jacques Villeneuve	32	Chevy	VAL; 11	VAL; 25	FRA; 3	FRA; 3	BRH; 15	BRH; 8	MOS; 22	MOS; 19	VEN; 3*	HOC; 5	HOC; 7	ZOL; 14	ZOL; 7	8th	431

==== Car No. 32 results - Elite 2 ====
NASCAR Whelen Euro Series - Elite 2 results
Year	Driver	No.	Make	1	2	3	4	5	6	7	8	9	10	11	12	13	NWES	Pts
2018	Florian Venturi	32	Ford	VAL; 3	VAL; 3	FRA; 17	FRA; 25	BRH; 3	BRH; 1*	TOU; 4	TOU; 17	HOC; 5	HOC; 3	ZOL; 1*	ZOL; 2		2nd	497
2019	Florian Venturi	32	Chevy	VAL; 21	VAL; 29	FRA; 27	FRA; 1*	BRH; 3*	BRH; 4*	MOS	MOS	VEN	HOC	HOC	ZOL	ZOL	27th	133

== Pinty's Series ==
Go Fas Racing Canada
- Owner(s): Archie St. Hilaire; Alain Lord Mounir
- Series: NASCAR Pinty's Series
- Race drivers: Alex Labbé
- Manufacturer: Ford
- Opened: 2016
- Closed: 2017

Career
- Debut: Clarington 200 (Canadian Tire Motorsport Park)
- Latest race: Pinty's Fall Brawl 200
- Races competed: 25
- Drivers' Championships: 1
- Race victories: 6
- Pole positions: 4

=== Car No. 32 history ===
Go Fas Racing Canada is a Canadian racing team in the NASCAR Pinty's Series that debuted in 2016. Founded by venture capitalist Alain Lord Mounir, Go Fas Racing Canada ran under the supervision of Dave Jacombs with the #32 driven by Alex Labbé. After the 2017 season ended, the team closed as Labbé moved to the NASCAR Xfinity Series to drive for DGM Racing.

==== Car No. 32 results ====
Year	Driver	No.	Make	1	2	3	4	5	6	7	8	9	10	11	12	13	Rank	Points
2016	Alex Labbé	32	Ford	MSP; 5	SSS; 15	ACD; 1*	ICAR; 2	TOR; 12	EIR; 7	SAS; 3	CTR; 4	RIS; 12	MSP; 23	ASE; 9	KWA; 3		7th	423
2017	Alex Labbé	32	Ford	MOS; 5	DEL; 1	CHA; 2	ICA; 4	TOR; 4	WYA; 1*	WYA; 3	EDM; 1*	TRO; 5	RIV; 1	MOS; 6	STE; 1*	JUK; 20	1st	542
