= 2025 WeatherTech 200 =

9th race of the 2025 NASCAR Canada Series

Race details
- Race 9 of 12 in the 2025 NASCAR Canada Series season
- Date: August 31, 2025
- Location: Canadian Tire Motorsport Park in Clarington, Ontario, Canada
- Course: 10-turn road course
- Course length: 2.459 miles (3.957 km)
- Distance: 51 laps, 125.41 mi (Distance_km km)
- Average speed: 70.389 miles per hour (113.280 km/h)

Pole position
Driver	Andrew Ranger	Paillé Course//Racing
- Time: 1:20.915

Most laps led
Driver	Sam Fellows	Fellows McGraw Racing
- Laps: 30

Winner
No. 96	Marc-Antoine Camirand	Paillé Course//Racing

Television in the United States
- Network: REV TV on YouTube

The 2025 WeatherTech 200 was the ninth stock car race of the 2025 NASCAR Canada Series. It was held on Sunday, August 31, at Canadian Tire Motorsport Park, a 2.459 mi (3.957 km) road course in Clarington, Ontario, Canada. The race took the scheduled 51 laps to complete. The race was won by Marc-Antoine Camirand, driving for Paillé Course//Racing, after he made a last lap move on Sam Fellows. Connor Bell finished the race in second and Fellows rounded out the podium in third.

== Report ==
=== Background ===
Canadian Tire Motorsport Park is a multi-track motorsport venue located north of Bowmanville in Clarington, Ontario, Canada, approximately 75 kilometres (47 miles) east of Toronto. The facility features a 3.957 km (2.459 mi), 10-turn road course; a 2.9 km (1.8 mi) advance driver and race driver training facility with a 0.402 km (0.250 mi) skid pad (Driver Development Centre) and a 1.5 km (0.93 mi) kart track.

==== Entry list ====
- (R) denotes rookie driver.
- (i) denotes driver who is ineligible for series driver points.

#	Driver	Team	Make
0	Glenn Styres	Glenn Styres Racing	Chevrolet
3	Connor Bell (R)	Ed Hakonson Racing	Chevrolet
6	Peter Klutt	Legendary Motorcar Company	Dodge
9	Mathieu Kingsbury	Innovation Auto Sport	Chevrolet
17	D. J. Kennington	DJK Racing	Dodge
22	Kyle Steckly	MBS Motorsports	Chevrolet
24	Jack Polito (R)	BC Race Cars	Ford
27	Andrew Ranger	Paillé Course//Racing	Chevrolet
39	Alex Guenette	JASS Racing	Chevrolet
42	Ryan Klutt	Legendary Motorcar Company	Dodge
47	L. P. Dumolin	Dumoulin Compétition	Dodge
48	Trevor Hill (R)	Ron Tomlinson	Chevrolet
55	Serge Bourdeau	Benoit Couture	Dodge
59	Gary Klutt	Legendary Motorcar Company	Dodge
69	Domenic Scrivo (R)	MBS Motorsports	Chevrolet
74	Kevin Lacroix	Innovation Auto Sport	Chevrolet
75	Benoit Couture	Benoit Couture	Dodge
80	Alex Tagliani	Group Theetge	Chevrolet
81	Brent Wheller	Brent Wheller Motorsports	Dodge
84	Larry Jackson	Larry Jackson Racing	Dodge
85	Darryl Timmers (R)	Larry Jackson Racing	Dodge
87	Sam Fellows	Fellows McGraw Racing	Chevrolet
88	Simon Charbonneau (R)	Eighty8Racing	Chevrolet
92	Dexter Stacey	Ed Hakonson Racing	Chevrolet
93	Jacques Guenette Sr. (R)	JASS Racing	Chevrolet
96	Marc-Antoine Camirand	Paillé Course//Racing	Chevrolet
98	Malcom Strachan	Jim Bray Autosport	Ford
99	Matthew Scannell	Larry Jackson Racing	Dodge

== Practice ==
The first and only practice session was held on August 30 at 12:40 PM EST. Alex Tagliani would set the fastest time in the session, with a lap of 1:21.373 and a speed of 108.788 mph (175.077 km/h).

Pos.	#	Driver	Team	Make	Time	Speed
1	80	Alex Tagliani	Group Theetge	Chevrolet	1:21.373	108.788
2	27	Andrew Ranger	Paillé Course//Racing	Chevrolet	1:21.723	108.322
3	96	Marc-Antoine Camirand	Paillé Course//Racing	Chevrolet	1:21.737	108.303
Full practice results

== Qualifying ==
Qualifying was held on August 30 at 4:45 PM EST. Andrew Ranger, driving for Paillé Course//Racing, would win the pole with a lap of 1:20.915 and a speed of 109.404 mph (176.069 km/h). Ranger was one of seven drivers to break the track record during the session. @nascarcanadaseries; (August 31, 2025). "Seven drivers rewrote the books in qualifying, breaking lap records with lightning-fast times at CTMP ⚡" – via Instagram.

Pos.	#	Driver	Team	Make	Time	Speed
1	27	Andrew Ranger	Paillé Course//Racing	Chevrolet	1:20.915	109.404
2	22	Kyle Steckly	MBS Motorsports	Chevrolet	1:20.936	109.375
3	59	Gary Klutt	Legendary Motorcar Company	Dodge	1:21.072	109.192
4	80	Alex Tagliani	Group Theetge	Chevrolet	1:21.350	108.819
5	96	Marc-Antoine Camirand	Paillé Course//Racing	Chevrolet	1:21.422	108.722
6	17	D. J. Kennington	DJK Racing	Dodge	1:21.476	108.650
7	74	Kevin Lacroix	Innovation Auto Sport	Chevrolet	1:21.783	108.243
8	39	Alex Guenette	JASS Racing	Chevrolet	1:21.930	108.048
9	87	Sam Fellows	Fellows McGraw Racing	Chevrolet	1:22.017	107.934
10	47	L. P. Dumolin	Dumoulin Compétition	Dodge	1:22.020	107.930
11	3	Connor Bell (R)	Ed Hakonson Racing	Chevrolet	1:22.232	107.652
12	24	Jack Polito (R)	BC Race Cars	Ford	1:22.405	107.246
13	99	Matthew Scannell	Larry Jackson Racing	Dodge	1:22.572	107.208
14	98	Malcom Strachan	Jim Bray Autosport	Ford	1:22.606	107.164
15	9	Mathieu Kingsbury	Innovation Auto Sport	Chevrolet	1:22.712	107.027
16	48	Trevor Hill (R)	Ron Tomlinson	Chevrolet	1:22.757	106.969
17	88	Simon Charbonneau (R)	Eighty8Racing	Chevrolet	1:22.839	106.863
18	42	Ryan Klutt	Legendary Motorcar Company	Dodge	1:22.972	106.691
19	92	Dexter Stacey	Ed Hakonson Racing	Chevrolet	1:23.201	106.398
20	84	Larry Jackson	Larry Jackson Racing	Dodge	1:23.260	106.322
21	6	Peter Klutt	Legendary Motorcar Company	Dodge	1:23.574	105.923
22	85	Darryl Timmers (R)	Larry Jackson Racing	Dodge	1:23.620	105.865
23	0	Glenn Styres	Glenn Styres Racing	Chevrolet	1:24.823	104.363
24	69	Domenic Scrivo (R)	MBS Motorsports	Chevrolet	1:25.838	103.129
25	81	Brent Wheller	Brent Wheller Motorsports	Dodge	1:27.332	101.365
26	55	Serge Bourdeau	Benoit Couture	Dodge	1:28.196	100.372
27	93	Jacques Guenette Sr. (R)	JASS Racing	Chevrolet	1:29.867	98.506
28	75	Benoit Couture (R)	Benoit Couture	Dodge	1:31.808	96.423

== Race results ==
Pos	St	#	Driver	Team	Manufacturer	Laps	Led	Status	Points
1	5	96	Marc-Antoine Camirand	Paillé Course//Racing	Chevrolet	51	1	Running	47
2	11	3	Connor Bell (R)	Ed Hakonson Racing	Chevrolet	51	0	Running	42
3	9	87	Sam Fellows	Fellows McGraw Racing	Chevrolet	51	30	Running	43
4	4	80	Alex Tagliani	Group Theetge	Chevrolet	51	0	Running	40
5	1	27	Andrew Ranger	Paillé Course//Racing	Chevrolet	51	17	Running	40
6	6	17	D.J. Kennington	DJK Racing	Dodge	51	0	Running	38
7	2	22	Kyle Steckly	MBS Motorsports	Chevrolet	51	1	Running	38
8	10	47	L.P. Dumoulin	Dumoulin Compétition	Dodge	51	0	Running	36
9	3	59	Gary Klutt	Legendary Motorcar Company	Dodge	51	0	Running	35
10	17	88	Simon Charbonneau (R)	Eighty8 Racing	Chevrolet	51	0	Running	34
11	8	39	Alex Guenette	JASS Racing	Chevrolet	51	0	Running	33
12	12	24	Jack Polito (R)	BC Race Cars	Ford	51	0	Running	32
13	13	99	Matthew Scannell	Larry Jackson Racing	Dodge	51	0	Running	31
14	16	48	Trevor Hill (R)	Ron Tomlinson	Chevrolet	51	0	Running	30
15	26	0	Glenn Styres	Glenn Styres Racing	Chevrolet	51	0	Running	29
16	22	69	Domenic Scrivo (R)	MBS Motorsports	Chevrolet	51	0	Running	28
17	19	92	Dexter Stacey	Ed Hakonson	Chevrolet	51	0	Running	27
18	24	85	Darryl Timmers (R)	Larry Jackson Racing	Dodge	51	2	Running	27
19	27	93	Jacques Guenette Sr. (R)	JASS Racing	Chevrolet	51	0	Running	25
20	23	81	Brent Wheller	Brent Wheller Motorsports	Dodge	49	0	Running	24
21	25	55	Serge Bourdeau	Benoit Couture	Dodge	48	0	Running	23
22	15	9	Mathieu Kingsbury	Innovation Auto Sport	Chevrolet	44	0	Accident	22
23	14	98	Malcolm Strachan	Jim Bray Autosport	Ford	37	0	Accident	21
24	7	74	Kevin Lacroix	Innovation Auto Sport	Chevrolet	27	0	Steering	20
25	28	75	Benoit Couture (R)	Benoit Couture	Dodge	15	0	Electrical	19
26	18	42	Ryan Klutt	Legendary Motorcar Company	Dodge	14	0	Accident	18
27	20	84	Larry Jackson	Larry Jackson Racing	Dodge	4	0	Accident	17
28	21	6	Peter Klutt	Legendary Motorcar Company	Dodge	0	0	Did Not Start	16

== Standings after the race ==
	Pos	Driver	Points
	1	Marc-Antoine Camirand	374
	2	Andrew Ranger	355 (–19)
	3	D. J. Kennington	350 (–24)
1	4	L.P. Dumoulin	327 (–47)
1	5	Kevin Lacroix	321 (–53)
	6	Mathieu Kingsbury	309 (–65)
	7	Ryan Vargas	227 (–147)
	8	Alex Guenette	223 (–151)
	9	Larry Jackson	190 (–184)
2	10	Alex Tagliani	172 (–198)

Previous race: 2025 Evirum 100	NASCAR Canada Series; 2025 season	Next race: 2025 APC 125
