= 2022 eBay Motors 200 =

Race details
- Race 2 of 13 in the 2022 NASCAR Pinty's Series season
- Date: May 22, 2022
- Location: Canadian Tire Motorsports Park in Bowmanville, Ontario
- Course: Permanent racing facility
- Course length: 2.459 miles (3.957 km)
- Distance: 51 laps, 125.409 mi (201.826 km)
- Average speed: 83.224

Pole position
Driver	Louis-Philippe Dumoulin	Marc-André Bergeron
- Time: N/A

Most laps led
Driver	Kevin Lacroix	Sylvain Lacroix
- Laps: 42

Winner
No. 74	Kevin Lacroix	Sylvain Lacroix

Television in the United States
- Network: FloSports

The 2022 eBay Motors 200 was a NASCAR Pinty's Series race that was held on May 22, 2022. It was contested over 51 laps on the 2.459-mile (3.957 km) road course. It was the 2nd race of the 2022 NASCAR Pinty's Series season. Kevin Lacroix turned Gary Klutt in the final turn to collect the victory.

== Report ==
=== Entry list ===
- (R) denotes rookie driver.
- (i) denotes driver who is ineligible for series driver points.

No.	Driver	Owner	Manufacturer
0	Glenn Styres	David Wight	Chevrolet
1	J. P. Bergeron	Dave Jacombs	Ford
2	T. J. Rinomato	David Wight	Chevrolet
3	Brett Taylor	Ed Hakonson	Chevrolet
6	Peter Klutt	Peter Klutt	Dodge
8	Ray Courtemanche Jr.	Ed Hakonson	Chevrolet
9	Brandon Watson	David Wight	Chevrolet
13	Louis-Phillipe Montour	Marc Montour	Dodge
17	D. J. Kennington	D. J. Kennington	Dodge
18	Alex Tagliani	Scott Steckly	Chevrolet
20	Treyten Lapcevich	Scott Steckly	Chevrolet
27	Andrew Ranger	David Wight	Chevrolet
31	Daniel Bois	MBS Motorsports	Chevrolet
47	Louis-Philippe Dumoulin	Marc-Andre Bergeron	Dodge
59	Gary Klutt	Peter Klutt	Dodge
61	Brent Wheller	Brent Wheller	Dodge
64	Mark Dilley	David Wight	Chevrolet
66	Wallace Stacey	Sunshine Stacey	Chevrolet
71	Bryan Cathcart	Bryan Cathcart	Dodge
74	Kevin Lacroix	Sylvain Lacroix	Dodge
84	Larry Jackson	David Stephens	Dodge
92	Dexter Stacey	Kristin Hamelin	Chevrolet
96	Marc-Antoine Camirand	Jean-Claude Paille	Chevrolet
98	Sam Fellows	Mike Curb	Chevrolet
99	Matthew Scannell	Howie Scannell Jr.	Dodge
Official entry list

== Practice ==
Pos	No.	Driver	Owner	Manufacturer	Time	Speed
1	47	Louis-Philippe Dumoulin	Marc-Andre Bergeron	Dodge	1:22.814	106.895
2	20	Treyten Lapcevich	Scott Steckly	Chevrolet	1:23.071	106.564
3	96	Marc-Antoine Camirand	Jean-Claude Paille	Chevrolet	1:23.090	106.540
Official first practice results

== Qualifying ==
=== Qualifying results ===
Pos	No	Driver	Owner	Manufacturer
1	47	Louis-Philippe Dumoulin	Marc-Andre Bergeron	Dodge
2	20	Treyten Lapcevich	Scott Steckly	Chevrolet
3	96	Marc-Antoine Camirand	Jean-Claude Paille	Chevrolet
4	3	Brett Taylor	Ed Hakonson	Chevrolet
5	99	Matthew Scannell	Howie Scannell Jr.	Dodge
6	18	Alex Tagliani	Scott Steckly	Chevrolet
7	17	D. J. Kennington	D. J. Kennington	Dodge
8	74	Kevin Lacroix	Sylvain Lacroix	Dodge
9	27	Andrew Ranger	Scott Steckly	Chevrolet
10	59	Gary Klutt	Peter Klutt	Dodge
11	31	Daniel Bois	MBS Motorsports	Chevrolet
12	92	Dexter Stacey	Kristin Hamelin	Chevrolet
13	6	Peter Klutt	Peter Klutt	Dodge
14	1	J. P. Bergeron	Dave Jacombs	Ford
15	9	Brandon Watson	David Wight	Chevrolet
16	98	Sam Fellows	Mike Curb	Chevrolet
17	84	Larry Jackson	David Stephens	Dodge
18	8	Ray Courtemanche Jr.	Ed Hakonson	Chevrolet
19	64	Mark Dilley	David Wight	Chevrolet
20	2	T. J. Rinomato	David Wight	Chevrolet
21	13	Louis-Philippe Mountour	Marc Mountour	Chevrolet
22	71	Bryan Cathcart	Bryan Cathcart	Dodge
23	61	Brent Wheller	Brent Wheller	Dodge
24	66	Wallace Stacey	Sunshine Stacey	Chevrolet
25	0	Glenn Styres	David Wight	Chevrolet
Official qualifying results

== Race ==
Laps: 57

Pos	Grid	No	Driver	Owner	Manufacturer	Laps	Points	Status
1	8	74	Kevin Lacroix	Sylvain Lacroix	Dodge	57	48	Running
2	6	18	Alex Tagliani	Scott Steckly	Chevrolet	57	42	Running
3	12	92	Dexter Stacey	Kristin Hamelin	Chevrolet	57	41	Running
4	10	59	Gary Klutt	Peter Klutt	Dodge	57	41	Running
5	21	13	Louis-Philippe Montour	Marc Montour	Chevrolet	57	39	Running
6	2	20	Treyten Lapcevich	Scott Steckly	Chevrolet	56	38	Running
7	1	47	L. P. Dumoulin	Marc-Andre Bergeron	Dodge	56	38	Running
8	15	9	Brandon Watson	David Wight	Chevrolet	56	36	Running
9	14	1	J. P. Bergeron	Dave Jacombs	Ford	56	35	Running
10	17	84	Larry Jackson	David Stephens	Dodge	56	34	Running
11	7	17	D. J. Kennington	D. J. Kennington	Dodge	56	33	Running
12	11	31	Daniel Bois	MBS Motorsports	Chevrolet	55	32	Fuel
13	4	3	Brett Taylor	Ed Hakonson	Chevrolet	55	31	Running
14	3	96	Marc-Antoine Camirand	Jean-Claude Paille	Chevrolet	54	31	Running
15	19	64	Mark Dilley	David Wight	Chevrolet	54	29	Running
16	20	2	T. J. Rinomato	David Wight	Chevrolet	53	28	Running
17	13	6	Peter Klutt	Peter Klutt	Dodge	51	27	Crash
18	25	0	Glenn Styres	David Wight	Chevrolet	51	26	Running
19	24	66	Wallace Stacey	Sunshine Stacey	Chevrolet	50	25	Running
20	22	71	Bryan Cathcart	Bryan Cathcart	Dodge	49	24	Running
21	23	61	Brent Wheller	Brent Wheller	Dodge	48	23	Running
22	5	99	Matthew Scannell	Howie Scannell Jr.	Dodge	46	22	Oil leak
23	18	8	Ray Courtemanche Jr.	Ed Hakonson	Chevrolet	44	21	Crash
24	9	27	Andrew Ranger	David Wight	Chevrolet	18	20	Oil leak
25	16	98	Sam Fellows	Mike Curb	Chevrolet	9	19	Vibration
Official race results

=== Race statistics ===
- Lead changes: 6
- Cautions/Laps: 2 for 9 laps
- Time of race: 1:41:03
- Average speed: 83.224 mph

Previous race: 2022 NTN Ultimate Bearing Experience 250	NASCAR Pinty's Series; 2022 season	Next race: 2022 QwickWick 250
