= 2014 Coca-Cola 600 =

Race details
- Race 12 of 36 in the 2014 NASCAR Sprint Cup Series
- The 2014 Coca-Cola 600 program cover, with artwork by Sam Bass. "Lights, Camera, Action!"
- Date: May 25, 2014
- Location: Charlotte Motor Speedway, Concord, North Carolina
- Course: Permanent racing facility
- Course length: 1.5 miles (2.4 km)
- Distance: 400 laps, 600 mi (965.606 km)
- Weather: Partly cloudy with a high temperature around 78 °F (26 °C); wind out of the southwest at 7 mph (11 km/h)
- Average speed: 145.484 mph (234.134 km/h)

Pole position
Driver	Jimmie Johnson	Hendrick Motorsports
- Time: 27.705

Most laps led
Driver	Jimmie Johnson	Hendrick Motorsports
- Laps: 164

Winner
No. 48	Jimmie Johnson	Hendrick Motorsports

Television in the United States
- Network: Fox & PRN
- Announcers: Mike Joy, Darrell Waltrip and Larry McReynolds (Television); Doug Rice and Mark Garrow (Booth); Rob Albright (1 & 2) and Wendy Venturini (3 & 4) (Turns) (Radio)
- Nielsen ratings: 4.1/9 (Final); 3.8/8 (Overnight); 6.956 Million viewers

The 2014 Coca-Cola 600, the 55th running of the event, was a NASCAR Sprint Cup Series stock car race held on May 25, 2014, at Charlotte Motor Speedway in Concord, North Carolina. Contested over 400 laps on the 1.5 miles (2.4 km) oval, it was the twelfth race of the 2014 NASCAR Sprint Cup Series. Jimmie Johnson won the race, his first of the season and fourth overall Coca-Cola 600 win, while Kevin Harvick finished second and Matt Kenseth, Carl Edwards and Jamie McMurray rounded out the top five. The top rookies of the race were Austin Dillon (16th), Kyle Larson (18th) and Cole Whitt (27th).

== Report ==
=== Entry list ===
The entry list for the Coca-Cola 600 was released on Monday, May 19, 2014 at 11:37 a.m. Eastern time. Forty-five drivers were entered for the race.

No.	Driver	Team	Manufacturer	Starts	Best finish
1	Jamie McMurray	Chip Ganassi Racing	Chevrolet	11	2nd
2	Brad Keselowski (PC2)	Team Penske	Ford	4	5th
3	Austin Dillon (R)	Richard Childress Racing	Chevrolet	0	—
4	Kevin Harvick	Stewart–Haas Racing	Chevrolet	13	1st
5	Kasey Kahne	Hendrick Motorsports	Chevrolet	10	1st
7	Michael Annett (R)	Tommy Baldwin Racing	Chevrolet	0	—
9	Marcos Ambrose	Richard Petty Motorsports	Ford	5	6th
10	Danica Patrick	Stewart–Haas Racing	Chevrolet	2	35th
11	Denny Hamlin	Joe Gibbs Racing	Toyota	8	2nd
13	Casey Mears	Germain Racing	Chevrolet	11	1st
14	Tony Stewart (PC3)	Stewart–Haas Racing	Chevrolet	15	3rd
15	Clint Bowyer	Michael Waltrip Racing	Toyota	8	7th
16	Greg Biffle	Roush Fenway Racing	Ford	11	2nd
17	Ricky Stenhouse Jr.	Roush Fenway Racing	Ford	2	11th
18	Kyle Busch	Joe Gibbs Racing	Toyota	10	3rd
20	Matt Kenseth (PC5)	Joe Gibbs Racing	Toyota	14	1st
21	Trevor Bayne (i)	Wood Brothers Racing	Ford	2	16th
22	Joey Logano	Team Penske	Ford	5	3rd
23	Alex Bowman (R)	BK Racing	Toyota	0	—
24	Jeff Gordon (PC6)	Hendrick Motorsports	Chevrolet	21	1st
26	Cole Whitt (R)	BK Racing	Toyota	0	—
27	Paul Menard	Richard Childress Racing	Chevrolet	7	8th
31	Ryan Newman	Richard Childress Racing	Chevrolet	13	2nd
32	Blake Koch (i)	Go FAS Racing	Ford	0	—
33	Brian Scott (i)	Circle Sport	Chevrolet	0	—
34	David Ragan	Front Row Motorsports	Ford	7	2nd
36	Reed Sorenson	Tommy Baldwin Racing	Chevrolet	4	4th
38	David Gilliland	Front Row Motorsports	Ford	7	20th
40	Landon Cassill (i)	Circle Sport	Chevrolet	3	18th
41	Kurt Busch (PC4)	Stewart–Haas Racing	Chevrolet	13	1st
42	Kyle Larson (R)	Chip Ganassi Racing	Chevrolet	0	—
43	Aric Almirola	Richard Petty Motorsports	Ford	2	16th
44	J. J. Yeley (i)	Xxxtreme Motorsports	Chevrolet	6	2nd
47	A. J. Allmendinger	JTG Daugherty Racing	Chevrolet	6	5th
48	Jimmie Johnson (PC1)	Hendrick Motorsports	Chevrolet	12	1st
51	Justin Allgaier (R)	HScott Motorsports	Chevrolet	0	—
55	Brian Vickers	Michael Waltrip Racing	Toyota	6	5th
66	Joe Nemechek (i)	Michael Waltrip Racing	Toyota	19	6th
77	Dave Blaney	Randy Humphrey Racing	Ford	14	14th
78	Martin Truex Jr.	Furniture Row Racing	Chevrolet	7	9th
83	Ryan Truex (R)	BK Racing	Toyota	0	—
88	Dale Earnhardt Jr.	Hendrick Motorsports	Chevrolet	16	4th
95	Michael McDowell	Leavine Family Racing	Ford	5	32nd
98	Josh Wise	Phil Parsons Racing	Chevrolet	2	26th
99	Carl Edwards	Roush Fenway Racing	Ford	9	3rd
Official entry list

Key	Meaning
(R)	Rookie
(i)	Ineligible for points
(PC#)	Past champions provisional

== Practice ==
=== First practice results ===
Dale Earnhardt Jr. was the fastest in first practice with a time of 27.941 and a speed of 193.264 mph (311.028 km/h).

Pos	No.	Driver	Team	Manufacturer	Time	Speed
1	88	Dale Earnhardt Jr.	Hendrick Motorsports	Chevrolet	27.941	193.264
2	4	Kevin Harvick	Stewart–Haas Racing	Chevrolet	28.101	192.164
3	48	Jimmie Johnson	Hendrick Motorsports	Chevrolet	28.123	192.014
Official first practice results

== Qualifying ==
Jimmie Johnson won the pole with a time of 27.705 and a speed of 194.911 mph (313.679 km/h). “We’ve watched other cars get faster through qualifying sessions,’’ Johnson said. “That’s something the (Hendrick Motorsports) cars really haven’t had a lot. We did that tonight. We’re hitting on some things that should help us run faster longer.’’ Matt Kenseth and Kevin Harvick didn't get a lap in before time expired in the final round and started eleventh and twelfth as a result. “We had a big miscommunication tonight and didn’t get @KevinHarvick off of pit road in time to run a lap in the final qualifying session,’’ Childers tweeted. “Apologies to all of the sponsors and fans. We will make sure it doesn’t happen again.’’ While three of the Hendrick cars made it to the final round of qualifying, Jeff Gordon didn't make it out of the first round. “It just disappoints us,’’ Gordon said of his qualifying performance. “We know our car is much better than this. These are about as challenging conditions as you can have when you have a really hot day like this and the sun goes down and it’s a total guessing game. We guessed wrong. We just missed the setup. The car has plenty of speed in it, so I’m not concerned about the race.’’ The two drivers who failed to qualify were Dave Blaney and J. J. Yeley.

=== Qualifying results ===
Pos	No.	Driver	Team	Manufacturer	R1	R2	R3
1	48	Jimmie Johnson	Hendrick Motorsports	Chevrolet	28.171	27.899	27.705
2	2	Brad Keselowski	Team Penske	Ford	28.294	27.969	27.754
3	5	Kasey Kahne	Hendrick Motorsports	Chevrolet	28.165	27.958	27.890
4	10	Danica Patrick	Stewart–Haas Racing	Chevrolet	28.118	27.750	27.931
5	15	Clint Bowyer	Michael Waltrip Racing	Toyota	28.260	27.973	27.944
6	11	Denny Hamlin	Joe Gibbs Racing	Toyota	28.171	27.823	27.962
7	18	Kyle Busch (Note: Kyle Busch started from the rear after crashing his primary car in the final practice session.)	Joe Gibbs Racing	Toyota	28.127	27.762	27.966
8	22	Joey Logano	Team Penske	Ford	28.172	28.020	28.056
9	9	Marcos Ambrose	Richard Petty Motorsports	Ford	28.133	28.005	28.173
10	88	Dale Earnhardt Jr.	Hendrick Motorsports	Chevrolet	28.183	28.014	28.232
11	4	Kevin Harvick	Stewart–Haas Racing	Chevrolet	27.845	27.841	0.000
12	20	Matt Kenseth	Joe Gibbs Racing	Toyota	28.222	27.994	0.000
13	43	Aric Almirola	Richard Petty Motorsports	Ford	28.176	28.024	—
14	21	Trevor Bayne	Wood Brothers Racing	Ford	28.187	28.054	—
15	78	Martin Truex Jr.	Furniture Row Racing	Chevrolet	28.063	28.061	—
16	55	Brian Vickers	Michael Waltrip Racing	Toyota	28.047	28.121	—
17	51	Justin Allgaier (R)	HScott Motorsports	Chevrolet	28.056	28.133	—
18	14	Tony Stewart	Stewart–Haas Racing	Chevrolet	28.092	28.136	—
19	33	Brian Scott (R)	Richard Childress Racing	Chevrolet	28.156	28.142	—
20	47	A. J. Allmendinger	JTG Daugherty Racing	Chevrolet	28.164	28.150	—
21	27	Paul Menard	Richard Childress Racing	Chevrolet	28.292	28.168	—
22	99	Carl Edwards	Roush Fenway Racing	Ford	28.247	28.424	—
23	17	Ricky Stenhouse Jr.	Roush Fenway Racing	Ford	28.185	28.540	—
24	16	Greg Biffle	Roush Fenway Racing	Ford	28.245	29.293	—
25	42	Kyle Larson (R)	Chip Ganassi Racing	Chevrolet	28.296	—	—
26	1	Jamie McMurray	Chip Ganassi Racing	Chevrolet	28.383	—	—
27	24	Jeff Gordon	Hendrick Motorsports	Chevrolet	28.470	—	—
28	41	Kurt Busch (Note: Kurt Busch was unable to make it to Charlotte in time for the mandatory drivers meeting, as he was competing in the Indianapolis 500.)	Stewart–Haas Racing	Chevrolet	28.488	—	—
29	23	Alex Bowman (R)	BK Racing	Toyota	28.494	—	—
30	95	Michael McDowell	Leavine Family Racing	Ford	28.549	—	—
31	26	Cole Whitt (R)	BK Racing	Toyota	28.554	—	—
32	3	Austin Dillon (R)	Richard Childress Racing	Chevrolet	28.562	—	—
33	38	David Gilliland	Front Row Motorsports	Ford	28.612	—	—
34	13	Casey Mears	Germain Racing	Chevrolet	28.642	—	—
35	34	David Ragan	Front Row Motorsports	Ford	28.654	—	—
36	83	Ryan Truex (R)	BK Racing	Toyota	28.659	—	—
37	98	Josh Wise	Phil Parsons Racing	Chevrolet	28.684	—	—
38	66	Joe Nemechek	Identity Ventures Racing	Toyota	28.729	—	—
39	7	Michael Annett (R)	Tommy Baldwin Racing	Chevrolet	28.753	—	—
40	40	Landon Cassill	Circle Sport	Chevrolet	28.791	—	—
41	36	Reed Sorenson	Tommy Baldwin Racing	Chevrolet	28.845	—	—
42	31	Ryan Newman	Richard Childress Racing	Chevrolet	28.894	—	—
43	32	Blake Koch	Go FAS Racing	Ford	29.043	—	—
Did not qualify
44	44	J. J. Yeley	Team XTREME Racing	Chevrolet	28.714	—	—
45	77	Dave Blaney	Randy Humphrey Racing	Ford	28.855	—	—
Qualifying Results

== Practice (post-qualifying) ==
=== Second practice ===
Carl Edwards was the fastest in second practice with a time of 28.008 and a speed of 192.802 mph (310.285 km/h).

Pos	No.	Driver	Team	Manufacturer	Time	Speed
1	99	Carl Edwards	Roush Fenway Racing	Ford	28.008	192.802
2	47	A. J. Allmendinger	JTG Daugherty Racing	Chevrolet	28.069	192.383
3	78	Martin Truex Jr.	Furniture Row Racing	Chevrolet	28.084	192.280
Official second practice results

=== Final practice ===
Kyle Busch was the fastest in final practice with a time of 28.626 and a speed of 188.640 mph (303.587 km/h) in the final practice session. However, he had to start at the back of the field, after crashing during the session, which necessitated a change to a backup car. Joe Gibbs Racing were able to get Busch's backup onto the track for the final 20 minutes of final practice. In his first run Busch radioed that the backup was "not even close to the other one," but by the end the driver was turning competitive laps that would keep him in contention. "We got the backup on the race track, and he ran some decent laps. They were competitive," Jimmy Makar said. "I think it's a good race car, so I think we should be in OK shape there. There were a couple of really fast cars in practice today that you'll have to contend with. But we'll have something he can race with, for sure."

Points leader Jeff Gordon sat out the final practice session due to back spasms. In fact, he only ran 11 laps in the second session before getting out of the car. "It doesn't do me any good to be out there in the car right now especially when the car is as good as it is," Gordon told Fox Sports 1. "It's really about getting prepared for 600 miles. I have no doubts that I can be in this car and be competitive if I take it easy over the next 24 hours." Gordon had a similar problem before the 2009 Coca-Cola 600, where he underwent a facet block procedure a few days before the event. Gordon suffered back spasms Thursday during qualifying. With no track activity Friday, Gordon rested his back but was still in pain Saturday. "I know he'll do everything he can to get in there and go," crew chief Alan Gustafson said about Gordon driving in the race. Nationwide Series championship leader Regan Smith was on standby if Gordon was not able to run the entire race. "We've tested a lot with Regan and have a really good baseline," Gustafson said, noting Smith drove Gordon's car at the NASCAR test at Charlotte in December. "We're real confident knowing what he'll need as far as the car drives."

Pos	No.	Driver	Team	Manufacturer	Time	Speed
1	18	Kyle Busch	Joe Gibbs Racing	Toyota	28.626	188.640
2	22	Joey Logano	Team Penske	Ford	28.683	188.265
3	10	Danica Patrick	Stewart–Haas Racing	Chevrolet	28.747	187.846
Official final practice results

== Race ==
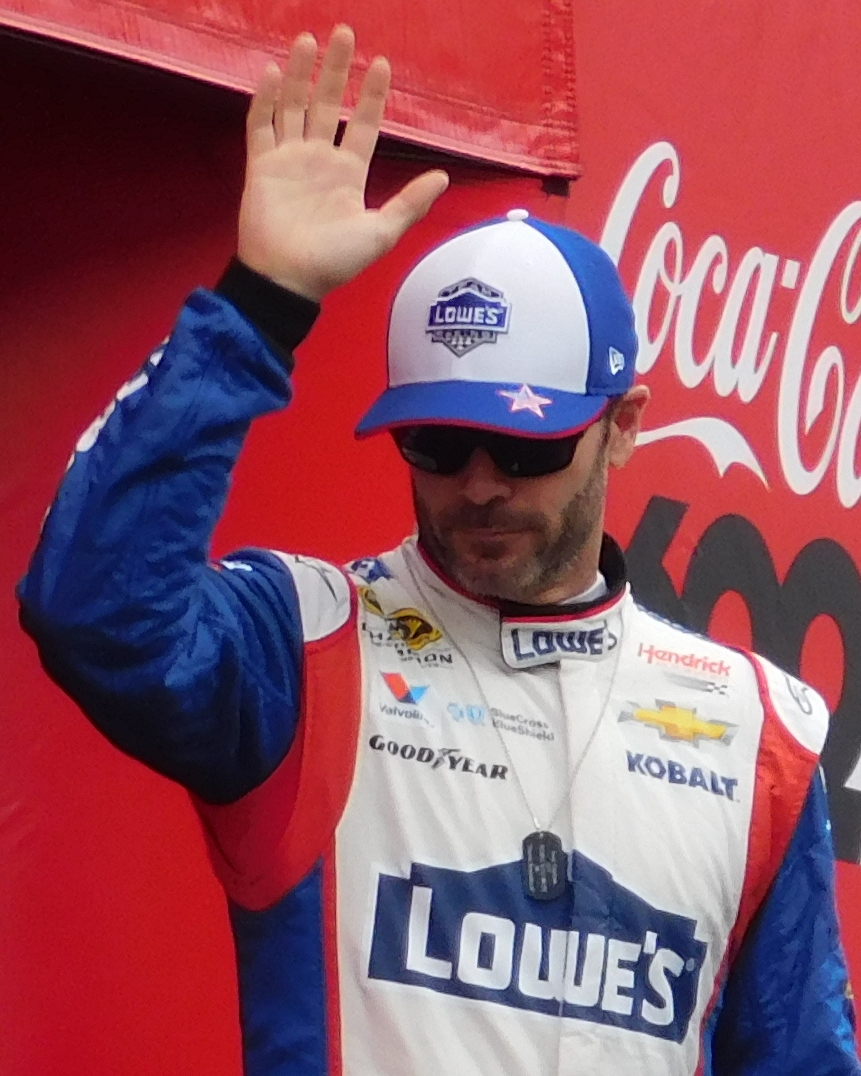
Jimmie Johnson won the race from the pole position.

The Coca-Cola 600 was scheduled to start at 6:18 p.m. but started five minutes late with Jimmie Johnson leading the field to the green flag.

Johnson surrendered the lead on lap 48 to make his first stop of the race. Brad Keselowski assumed the lead.

Keselowski ducked onto pit road on lap 49 and the lead cycled back to Johnson. During the cycle, Marcos Ambrose had to serve a pass-through penalty after an uncontrolled tire left his pit box.

Kevin Harvick took the lead on lap 76.

Harvick hit pit road on lap 96 and handed the lead back to Jimmie Johnson.

Johnson stopped the next lap and the lead cycled back to Kevin.

After going caution-free for the first 108 laps, debris in turn 3 brought out the first caution of the race. Kevin Harvick swapped the lead with Jimmie Johnson, with the former being pitted behind the start/finish line, but exited pit road with the lead.

The race restarted on lap 114.

Debris on the backstretch brought out the second caution of the race on lap 148. As it was the previous caution, Harvick swapped the lead with Johnson. Only this time, Jimmie exited with the lead.

The race restarted on lap 154.

The third caution of the race flew on lap 164 when David Gilliland cut down his right-front tire and slammed the wall in turn 1. Brad Keselowski opted not to pit when the leaders did and moved back to the lead.

The race restarted on lap 170.

Kevin Harvick took back the lead on lap 192.

Harvick hit pit road on lap 213 and handed the lead to Jeff Gordon.

Gordon dove onto pit road on lap 214 and handed the lead to teammate Dale Earnhardt Jr.

Earnhardt Jr. pitted the next lap and the lead went to Jamie McMurray. Teammate Kyle Larson cut down his right-front tire but made it to pit road without any hiccups.

McMurray gave up the lead to pit on lap 216 and Kevin Harvick cycled back to the front.

Debris on the backstretch brought out the fourth caution of the race on lap 223. Dale Earnhardt Jr. didn't pit with the leaders and assumed the lead.

The race restarted on lap 228.

The fifth caution of the race flew on lap 235 when Marcos Ambrose cut down his right-rear tire and spun out exiting turn 4. Landon Cassill got turned by Josh Wise trying to avoid Ambrose. Brian Scott, trying to avoid the spinning Ambrose as well, tagged the wall, bounced into Danica Patrick, hooked her and sent her into the wall. She didn't suffer any damage tagging the wall, but she tore up the left-rear corner panel. Dale Earnhardt Jr. stopped during the caution period and Jamie McMurray moved to the head of the line.

The race restarted on lap 242.

McMurray hit pit road on lap 271 and handed the lead to Matt Kenseth.

The sixth caution of the race flew on lap 274 when Kurt Busch, who had been dealing with dropped cylinders, blew an engine on the backstretch. Busch, who finished sixth in the Indianapolis 500, would finish a disappointing 40th. "It acted like it swallowed three cylinders all at once," he said. "It's kind of a shame. It symbolizes how tough it has been for (my NASCAR) team. I thought it was great racing in traffic. The feel of the stock car right after driving the IndyCar is a feeling I'll never forget." Kurt ended completing 907 of the 1,100 combined miles that make up the Indianapolis 500 and the Coca-Cola 600. Kenseth and Jeff Gordon swapped the lead on pit road, with the former pitted behind the start/finish line, but Jimmie Johnson found himself back in the lead.

The race restarted on lap 283.

The seventh caution of the race flew on lap 286 when Danica Patrick, who was dealing with the same ailments that plagued her teammate Kurt Busch, blew an engine exiting turn 4 and slammed the wall.

The race restarted on lap 294 and Matt Kenseth made his way to the lead.

Jimmie Johnson passed Kenseth in turn 1 to take back the lead on lap 312.

Johnson surrendered the lead to pit on lap 331 and handed the lead to Brad Keselowski.

Keselowski pitted with 57 laps to go and Aric Almirola assumed the lead.

Almirola ducked onto pit road with 56 laps to go and the lead cycled back to Jimmie Johnson.

Johnson made his final pit stop with 27 laps to go and handed the lead to his teammate Jeff Gordon.

Gordon pitted the next lap and handed the lead to Carl Edwards.

The eighth caution of the race flew with 22 laps to go after Alex Bowman slammed the wall in turn 3. Edwards pitted and handed the lead back to Gordon.

The race restarted with 17 laps to go and Jeff Gordon on two new tires couldn't hold off Matt Kenseth with four.

Jimmie Johnson took the lead with nine laps to go and pulled away from Kevin Harvick to score his first win of the season and first points win at Charlotte Motor Speedway since 2009. In the process, he broke a tie with Bobby Allison for the most wins at Charlotte. “There are more people fretting about things than myself,” said Johnson. “I mean what 12 races? Give me a break. Obviously it’s great to win and we are very happy to win here especially in the backyard of Hendrick Motorsports, Lowe’s headquarters is just up the road as well. I was happy to get by the No. 24 (Jeff Gordon) and then the No. 20 (Kenseth). I wasn't sure I was going to get by both of them, but I did and brought this baby home." “Yeah. We had a fast car all night,” said Harvick. “Just kind of fumbled again on pit road. Got behind, got a lap down. We needed a 700 mile race to get back to where we needed to be.” “Got a good restart, got out front,” said Kenseth. “Unfortunately didn't have enough speed to hold off Jimmie and Kevin and hang on to win.”

=== Race results ===
Pos	No.	Driver	Team	Manufacturer	Laps	Points
1	48	Jimmie Johnson	Hendrick Motorsports	Chevrolet	400	48
2	4	Kevin Harvick	Stewart–Haas Racing	Chevrolet	400	43
3	20	Matt Kenseth	Joe Gibbs Racing	Toyota	400	42
4	99	Carl Edwards	Roush Fenway Racing	Ford	400	41
5	1	Jamie McMurray	Chip Ganassi Racing	Chevrolet	400	40
6	55	Brian Vickers	Michael Waltrip Racing	Toyota	400	38
7	24	Jeff Gordon	Hendrick Motorsports	Chevrolet	400	38
8	27	Paul Menard	Richard Childress Racing	Chevrolet	400	36
9	18	Kyle Busch	Joe Gibbs Racing	Toyota	400	35
10	2	Brad Keselowski	Team Penske	Ford	400	35
11	43	Aric Almirola	Richard Petty Motorsports	Toyota	400	34
12	22	Joey Logano	Team Penske	Ford	400	32
13	14	Tony Stewart	Stewart–Haas Racing	Chevrolet	400	31
14	5	Kasey Kahne	Hendrick Motorsports	Chevrolet	399	30
15	31	Ryan Newman	Richard Childress Racing	Chevrolet	399	29
16	3	Austin Dillon (R)	Richard Childress Racing	Chevrolet	399	28
17	15	Clint Bowyer	Michael Waltrip Racing	Toyota	399	27
18	42	Kyle Larson (R)	Chip Ganassi Racing	Chevrolet	398	26
19	88	Dale Earnhardt Jr.	Hendrick Motorsports	Chevrolet	398	26
20	21	Trevor Bayne	Wood Brothers Racing	Ford	398	0
21	16	Greg Biffle	Roush Fenway Racing	Ford	398	23
22	11	Denny Hamlin	Joe Gibbs Racing	Toyota	398	22
23	47	A. J. Allmendinger	JTG Daugherty Racing	Chevrolet	398	21
24	13	Casey Mears	Germain Racing	Chevrolet	398	20
25	78	Martin Truex Jr.	Furniture Row Racing	Chevrolet	398	19
26	17	Ricky Stenhouse Jr.	Roush Fenway Racing	Ford	397	18
27	26	Cole Whitt (R)	BK Racing	Toyota	397	17
28	7	Michael Annett (R)	Tommy Baldwin Racing	Chevrolet	396	16
29	9	Marcos Ambrose	Richard Petty Motorsports	Ford	396	15
30	95	Michael McDowell	Leavine Family Racing	Ford	396	14
31	34	David Ragan	Front Row Motorsports	Ford	395	13
32	32	Brian Scott	Richard Childress Racing	Chevrolet	395	0
33	23	Alex Bowman (R)	BK Racing	Toyota	392	11
34	66	Joe Nemechek	Michael Waltrip Racing	Toyota	390	0
35	32	Blake Koch	Go FAS Racing	Ford	390	0
36	40	Landon Cassill	Circle Sport	Chevrolet	382	0
37	51	Justin Allgaier (R)	HScott Motorsports	Chevrolet	378	7
38	83	Ryan Truex (R)	BK Racing	Toyota	303	6
39	10	Danica Patrick	Stewart–Haas Racing	Chevrolet	281	5
40	41	Kurt Busch	Stewart–Haas Racing	Chevrolet	271	4
41	98	Josh Wise	Phil Parsons Racing	Chevrolet	229	3
42	36	Reed Sorenson	Tommy Baldwin Racing	Chevrolet	162	2
43	38	David Gilliland	Front Row Motorsports	Ford	160	1
Race Results

=== Race statistics ===
- Lead changes: 34 among different drivers
- Cautions/Laps: 8 for 44
- Red flags: 0
- Time of race: 4 hours, 7 minutes and 27 seconds
- Average speed: 145.484 miles per hour (234.134 km/h)

== Media ==
=== Television ===
Fox Sports
Booth announcers	Pit reporters
Lap-by-lap: Mike Joy; Color-commentator: Larry McReynolds; Color commentator: Darrell Waltrip	Matt Yocum; Steve Byrnes; Krista Voda; Jeff Hammond

=== Radio ===
PRN Radio
Booth announcers	Turn announcers	Pit reporters
Lead announcer: Doug Rice; Announcer: Mark Garrow	Turns 1 & 2: Rob Albright; Turns 3 & 4: Wendy Venturini	Brett McMillan; Steve Richards; Jim Noble; Pat Patterson

== Standings after the race ==
Drivers' Championship standings

	Pos	Driver	Points
	1	Jeff Gordon	432
	2	Matt Kenseth	421 (−11)
	3	Kyle Busch	408 (−24)
1	4	Carl Edwards	408 (−24)
1	5	Dale Earnhardt Jr.	394 (−38)
1	6	Jimmie Johnson	388 (−44)
1	7	Joey Logano	378 (−54)
2	8	Brian Vickers	365 (−67)
2	9	Brad Keselowski	361 (−71)
2	10	Ryan Newman	361 (−71)
2	11	Greg Biffle	351 (−81)
3	12	Kevin Harvick	345 (−87)
	13	Kyle Larson (R)	344 (−88)
2	14	Denny Hamlin	340 (−92)
1	15	Austin Dillon (R)	334 (−98)
2	16	Paul Menard	328 (−104)

Manufacturers' Championship standings

Pos	Manufacturer	Points
1	Chevrolet	537
2	Ford	515 (−22)
3	Toyota	486 (−51)

- Note: Only the first sixteen positions are included for the driver standings.

== Note ==
Previous race: 2014 NASCAR Sprint All-Star Race	Sprint Cup Series; 2014 season	Next race: 2014 FedEx 400
