= Marc-André Bergeron =

Canadian ice hockey player (born 1980)

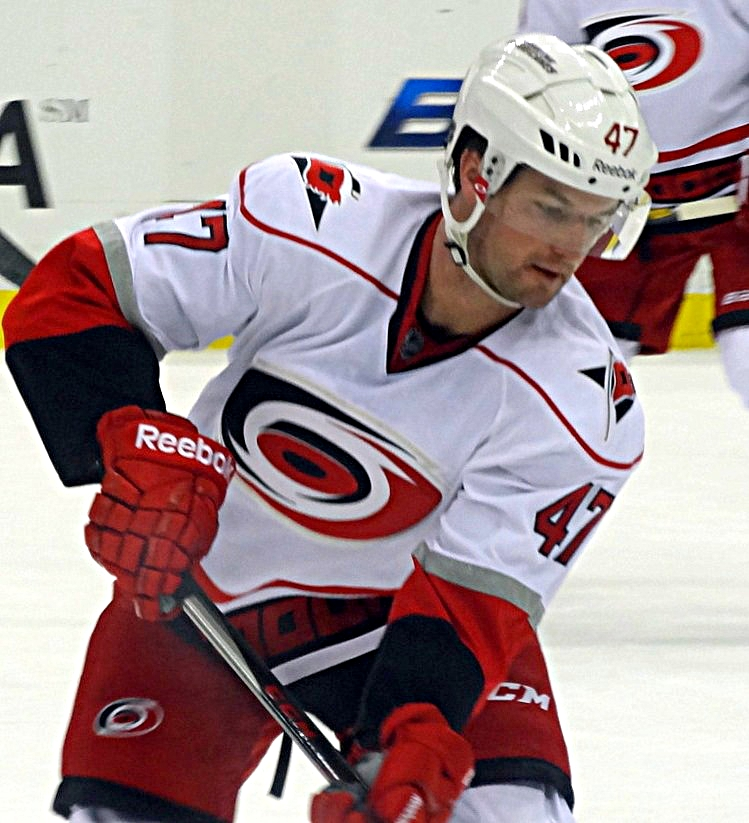
- Bergeron with the Hurricanes in 2013.
- Born: October 13, 1980 (age 45) Saint-Louis-de-France, Quebec, Canada
- Height: 5 ft 9 in (175 cm)
- Weight: 198 lb (90 kg; 14 st 2 lb)
- Position: Defence
- Shot: Left
- Played for: Edmonton Oilers; New York Islanders; Anaheim Ducks; Minnesota Wild; Montreal Canadiens; Tampa Bay Lightning; Carolina Hurricanes; ZSC Lions
- NHL draft: Undrafted
- Playing career: 2002–2017

Joseph Marc-André Bergeron (born October 13, 1980) is a Canadian former professional ice hockey defenceman who played ten seasons in the National Hockey League (NHL) before spending the later years of his career with the ZSC Lions of the National League (NL). Known as a power play specialist, more than half of Bergeron's career goals and points came on the man advantage.

== Playing career ==
Bergeron was signed as a free agent by the Edmonton Oilers in 2001. A swift defenceman with a penchant for end-to-end rushes, he reminded some of former Oiler great Paul Coffey. Bergeron's popularity with Edmonton fans was cemented during the 2003 playoffs when he sent Dallas Stars' Brenden Morrow head-over-heels with an open-ice hip check. Bergeron is well known more for his impressive slapshot than his defensive abilities. At the Edmonton Oilers skills competition, held November 26, 2006, he recorded his second straight victory in the hardest shot competition with a puck speed of 103.5 mph (approximately 165 km/h).

While still with the Oilers, near the end of game one of the 2006 Stanley Cup Finals, Bergeron tried to steer Carolina Hurricanes forward Andrew Ladd wide of the net. However, the two of them piled into Oilers goaltender Dwayne Roloson, causing Roloson to be injured for the remainder of the Finals. The Oilers managed to re-group without Roloson but ultimately fell to the Hurricanes in game seven of the series.

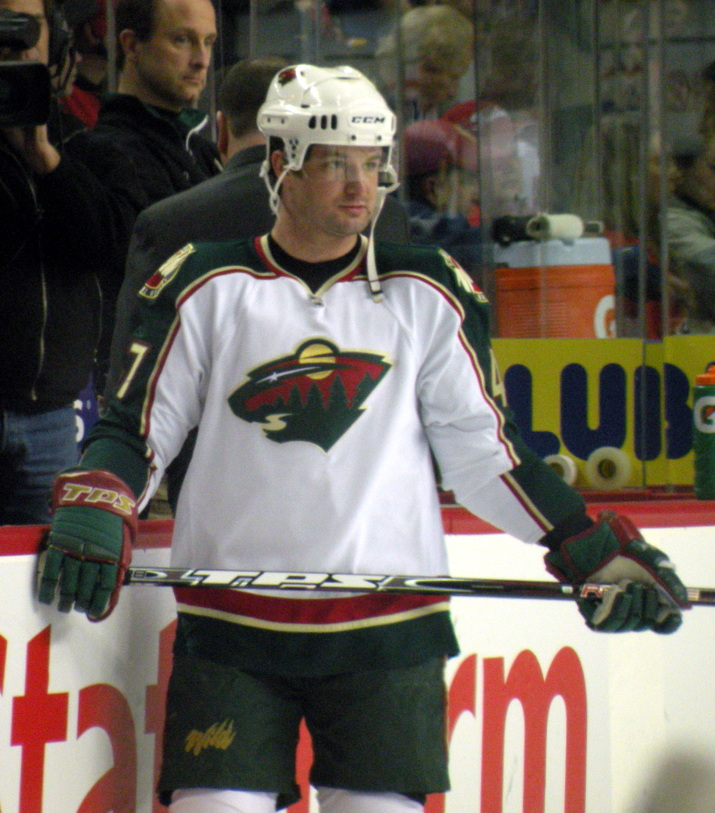
Bergeron during his time with the Minnesota Wild

After parting ways with the Oilers, Bergeron went on to play with the New York Islanders, Anaheim Ducks, and Minnesota Wild. On October 6, 2009, after star defenceman Andrei Markov was injured, Bergeron signed a 1-year contract with the Montreal Canadiens. Bergeron proved to be a valuable component to the Canadiens, playing forward on the fourth line as well as defence on power plays. He did, however, suffer a long scoring slump between December 31, 2009, until March 31, 2010. When Bergeron became a free agent on July 1, the Canadiens did not re-sign him.

He was signed by the Tampa Bay Lightning as a free agent on January 4, 2011 and assigned to the Norfolk Admirals of the AHL where he recorded two goals and eight points in 13 games. Bergeron was recalled to the Lightning on February 5 and spent the remainder of the season in Tampa Bay, and appeared in 23 games with the Lightning, recording two goals and eight points, including one game-winning goal. He recorded two assists in his Lightning debut on February 6 against the St. Louis Blues and became the third player in franchise history to score his first Lightning goal in overtime on February 12 versus Carolina. Bergeron became a fan-favourite and helped the team reach the Eastern Conference Finals, against the Boston Bruins. On June 28, Bergeron was re-signed to a two-year contract worth $2,000,000.

During the lockout shortened 2012–13 season, Bergeron was traded by the Lightning to the Carolina Hurricanes in exchange for Adam Hall and a seventh-round draft pick on April 2, 2013.

On July 19, Bergeron left the NHL as a free agent and signed to a three-year contract with the ZSC Lions of the National League (NL). He won the Swiss championship in 2014 and the Swiss Cup in 2016.

After the completion of his three-year deal with the Lions in Switzerland, Bergeron returned to North America as a free agent. Opting to pursue another NHL opportunity, Bergeron agreed to a professional try-out contract to attend the Columbus Blue Jackets training camp on September 6, 2016. He later signed a PTO contract with the Jackets' AHL affiliate, Cleveland Monsters. Producing 9 points in his first 13 games with the Monsters, Bergeron secured a two-way NHL contract with the Blue Jackets for the remainder of the season on February 28, 2017.

At the conclusion of his season with the Cleveland Monsters, Bergeron ended his professional playing career in the off-season, accepting a role as a director of player development with former junior club, the Shawinigan Cataractes of the QMJHL.

In 2020, Bergeron became the vice-president and general manager of the Trois-Rivières Lions in the ECHL. On June 22, 2023, Bergeron was fired from his positions.

== NASCAR team ownership ==
In 2009, Bergeron formed a partnership with NASCAR driver Louis-Philippe Dumoulin to field a car in the NASCAR Pinty's Series for Dumoulin. Dumoulin, who won the 2014, 2018, and 2021 championships, drives the No. 47 as it was Bergeron's number during his playing career.

== Career statistics ==
| | | | Regular season | | | | | Playoffs |
| Season | Team | League | GP | G | A | Pts | PIM | GP | G | A | Pts | PIM |
|---|---|---|---|---|---|---|---|---|---|---|---|---|
| 1996–97 | Cap-de-la-Madeleine Estacades | QMAAA | 4 | 0 | 1 | 1 | 0 | 2 | 0 | 0 | 0 | 0 |
| 1997–98 | Baie-Comeau Drakkar | QMJHL | 40 | 6 | 14 | 20 | 48 | — | — | — | — | — |
| 1998–99 | Baie-Comeau Drakkar | QMJHL | 46 | 8 | 14 | 22 | 57 | — | — | — | — | — |
| 1998–99 | Shawinigan Cataractes | QMJHL | 24 | 6 | 7 | 13 | 66 | 5 | 2 | 2 | 4 | 24 |
| 1999–2000 | Shawinigan Cataractes | QMJHL | 70 | 24 | 50 | 74 | 173 | 13 | 4 | 7 | 11 | 45 |
| 2000–01 | Shawinigan Cataractes | QMJHL | 69 | 42 | 59 | 101 | 185 | 10 | 4 | 11 | 15 | 24 |
| 2001–02 | Hamilton Bulldogs | AHL | 50 | 2 | 13 | 15 | 61 | 9 | 1 | 4 | 5 | 8 |
| 2002–03 | Hamilton Bulldogs | AHL | 66 | 8 | 31 | 39 | 73 | 20 | 0 | 7 | 7 | 25 |
| 2002–03 | Edmonton Oilers | NHL | 5 | 1 | 1 | 2 | 9 | 1 | 0 | 1 | 1 | 0 |
| 2003–04 | Edmonton Oilers | NHL | 54 | 9 | 17 | 26 | 26 | — | — | — | — | — |
| 2003–04 | Toronto Roadrunners | AHL | 17 | 4 | 3 | 7 | 23 | — | — | — | — | — |
| 2004–05 | Trois-Rivières Caron & Guay | LNAH | 10 | 7 | 5 | 12 | 6 | — | — | — | — | — |
| 2004–05 | Brynäs IF | SEL | 10 | 3 | 2 | 5 | 72 | — | — | — | — | — |
| 2005–06 | Edmonton Oilers | NHL | 75 | 15 | 20 | 35 | 38 | 18 | 2 | 1 | 3 | 14 |
| 2006–07 | Edmonton Oilers | NHL | 55 | 8 | 17 | 25 | 28 | — | — | — | — | — |
| 2006–07 | New York Islanders | NHL | 23 | 6 | 15 | 21 | 10 | 5 | 1 | 1 | 2 | 6 |
| 2007–08 | New York Islanders | NHL | 46 | 9 | 9 | 18 | 16 | — | — | — | — | — |
| 2007–08 | Anaheim Ducks | NHL | 9 | 0 | 1 | 1 | 4 | — | — | — | — | — |
| 2008–09 | Minnesota Wild | NHL | 72 | 14 | 18 | 32 | 30 | — | — | — | — | — |
| 2009–10 | Hamilton Bulldogs | AHL | 3 | 0 | 6 | 6 | 0 | — | — | — | — | — |
| 2009–10 | Montreal Canadiens | NHL | 60 | 13 | 21 | 34 | 16 | 19 | 2 | 4 | 6 | 10 |
| 2010–11 | Norfolk Admirals | AHL | 13 | 2 | 6 | 8 | 6 | — | — | — | — | — |
| 2010–11 | Tampa Bay Lightning | NHL | 23 | 2 | 6 | 8 | 8 | 14 | 2 | 1 | 3 | 9 |
| 2011–12 | Tampa Bay Lightning | NHL | 43 | 4 | 20 | 24 | 20 | — | — | — | — | — |
| 2012–13 | Tampa Bay Lightning | NHL | 12 | 1 | 4 | 5 | 4 | — | — | — | — | — |
| 2012–13 | Carolina Hurricanes | NHL | 13 | 0 | 4 | 4 | 5 | — | — | — | — | — |
| 2013–14 | ZSC Lions | NLA | 46 | 7 | 26 | 33 | 40 | 14 | 2 | 6 | 8 | 31 |
| 2014–15 | ZSC Lions | NLA | 46 | 4 | 16 | 20 | 38 | 13 | 0 | 6 | 6 | 10 |
| 2015–16 | ZSC Lions | NLA | 43 | 7 | 18 | 25 | 22 | 3 | 1 | 1 | 2 | 0 |
| 2016–17 | Cleveland Monsters | AHL | 22 | 5 | 8 | 13 | 8 | — | — | — | — | — |
| AHL totals | | | 171 | 21 | 67 | 88 | 171 | 29 | 1 | 11 | 12 | 33 |
| NHL totals | | | 490 | 82 | 153 | 235 | 214 | 57 | 7 | 8 | 15 | 39 |
| NLA totals | | | 135 | 18 | 60 | 78 | 100 | 30 | 3 | 13 | 16 | 41 |

== Transactions ==
- July 20, 2001 – Signed as free agent with Edmonton Oilers.
- February 18, 2007 – Traded to New York Islanders with 2008 third round selection for Denis Grebeshkov.
- February 26, 2008 – Traded to Anaheim Ducks for 2008 third round selection.
- June 10, 2008 – Traded to Minnesota Wild for a 2008 third round pick.
- October 6, 2009 – Signed as free agent with Montreal Canadiens.
- January 4, 2011 – Signed one-year contract with the Tampa Bay Lightning
- June 28, 2011 – Signed two-year contract with the Tampa Bay Lightning
- April 2, 2013 – Traded to the Carolina Hurricanes for Adam Hall and a 2013 seventh round Pick
