= 2025 NASCAR Canada 300 =

2nd race of the 2025 NASCAR Canada Series

Race details
- Race 2 of 12 in the 2025 NASCAR Canada Series season
- Location: Riverside International Speedway in James River, Nova Scotia, Canada
- Course: Permanent racing facility
- Course length: 0.333 miles (0.536 km)
- Distance: 300 laps, 99.9 mi (160.773 km)
- Average speed: 64.788 miles per hour (104.266 km/h)

Pole position
Driver	D. J. Kennington	DJK Racing
- Time: 14.562

Most laps led
Driver	D. J. Kennington	DJK Racing
- Laps: 147

Winner
No. 17	D. J. Kennington	DJK Racing

The 2025 NASCAR Canada 300, also called the Riverside 300, was the second stock car race of the 2025 NASCAR Canada Series. The race was held on Saturday, June 28, 2025, at Riverside International Speedway, a 0.333 mi (0.536 km) oval shaped racetrack in James River, Nova Scotia, Canada. The race took the scheduled 300 laps to complete. The race was won by D. J. Kennington, driving for DJK Racing, after he started on pole and led the most laps. Will Larue, driving for Larue Motorsports, finished in second, and Ryan Vargas, also driving for DJK Racing, scored his first career podium in third.

== Report ==
=== Background ===
Riverside International Speedway is a 0.333 mi (0.536 km), high banked, asphalt short track located in James River, Nova Scotia, Canada, about 10 km (6.2 mi) southwest of the town of Antigonish.

==== Entry list ====
- (R) denotes rookie driver.
- (i) denotes driver who is ineligible for series driver points.

#	Driver	Team	Make
3	Jason Hathaway	Ed Hakonson Racing	Chevrolet
04	Bryan Cathcart	Dumoulin Compétition	Dodge
8	Sara Thorne	Ed Hakonson Racing	Chevrolet
9	Mathieu Kingsbury	Innovation Auto Sport	Chevrolet
17	D. J. Kennington	DJK Racing	Dodge
27	Andrew Ranger	Paillé Course//Racing	Chevrolet
28	Ryan Vargas	DJK Racing	Dodge
45	Will Larue	Larue Motorsports	Chevrolet
47	L. P. Dumoulin	Dumoulin Compétition	Dodge
74	Kevin Lacroix	Innovation Auto Sport	Chevrolet
80	Donald Theetge	Group Theetge	Chevrolet
84	Larry Jackson	Larry Jackson Racing	Dodge
96	Marc-Antoine Camirand	Paillé Course//Racing	Chevrolet
98	Brent Wheller	Jim Bray Autosport	Ford

== Practice ==
The first and only practice session took place on Saturday, June 28, at 1:30 PM AST and lasted for 45 minutes. Donald Theetge would set the fastest time in the session, with a lap of 14.658 seconds with a speed of 81.785 mph (131.620 km/h).

Pos.	#	Driver	Team	Make	Time	Speed
1	80	Donald Theetge	DJK Racing	Dodge	14.658	81.785
2	45	Will Larue	Larue Motorsports	Chevrolet	14.693	81.590
3	96	Marc-Antoine Camirand	Paillé Course//Racing	Chevrolet	14.743	81.313
Full practice results

== Qualifying ==
Qualifying was held on Saturday, June 28, at 7:00 PM AST. D. J. Kennington, driving for DJK Racing, would win the pole with a lap of 14.562 seconds and a speed of 82.324 mph (132.488 km/h).

Pos.	#	Driver	Team	Make	Time	Speed
1	17	D. J. Kennington	DJK Racing	Dodge	14.562	82.324
2	74	Kevin Lacroix	Innovation Auto Sport	Chevrolet	14.647	81.846
3	80	Donald Theetge	Group Theetge	Chevrolet	14.657	81.790
4	9	Mathieu Kingsbury	Innovation Auto Sport	Chevrolet	14.716	81.462
5	27	Andrew Ranger	Paillé Course//Racing	Chevrolet	14.741	81.324
6	3	Jason Hathaway	Ed Hakonson Racing	Chevrolet	14.808	80.656
7	45	Will Larue	Larue Motorsports	Chevrolet	14.848	80.738
8	96	Marc-Antoine Camirand	Paillé Course//Racing	Chevrolet	14.872	80.608
9	28	Ryan Vargas	DJK Racing	Dodge	14.873	80.602
10	47	L. P. Dumoulin	Dumoulin Compétition	Dodge	14.879	80.570
11	84	Larry Jackson	Larry Jackson Racing	Dodge	15.203	78.853
12	8	Sara Thorne	Ed Hakonson Racing	Chevrolet	15.337	78.164
13	04	Bryan Cathcart	Dumoulin Compétition	Dodge	15.507	77.307
14	98	Brent Wheller	Jim Bray Autosport	Ford	15.544	77.123
Full qualifying results

== Race results ==
Pos	St	#	Driver	Team	Manufacturer	Laps	Led	Status	Points
1	1	17	D. J. Kennington	DJK Racing	Dodge	300	147	Running	48
2	7	45	Will Larue	Larue Motorsports	Chevrolet	300	30	Running	43
3	9	28	Ryan Vargas	DJK Racing	Dodge	300	0	Running	41
4	5	27	Andrew Ranger	Paillé Course//Racing	Chevrolet	300	0	Running	40
5	4	9	Mathieu Kingsbury	Innovation Auto Sport	Chevrolet	300	0	Running	39
6	2	74	Kevin Lacroix	Innovation Auto Sport	Chevrolet	300	123	Running	39
7	8	96	Marc-Antoine Camirand	Paillé Course//Racing	Chevrolet	299	0	Running	37
8	10	47	L. P. Dumoulin	Dumoulin Compétition	Dodge	299	0	Running	36
9	6	3	Jason Hathway	Ed Hakonson Racing	Chevrolet	299	0	Running	35
10	11	84	Larry Jackson	Larry Jackson Racing	Dodge	298	0	Running	34
11	12	8	Sara Thorne	Ed Hakonson Racing	Chevrolet	295	0	Running	33
12	14	98	Brent Wheller	Jim Bray Autosport	Ford	252	0	Running	32
13	13	04	Bryan Cathcart	Dumoulin Compétition	Dodge	19	0	Electrical	31
14	3	80	Donald Theetge	Group Theetge	Chevrolet	2	0	Suspension	30

== Standings after the race ==
	Pos	Driver	Points
6	1	D. J. Kennington	85
1	2	Marc-Antoine Camirand	84 (–1)
3	3	Andrew Ranger	78 (–7)
1	4	L. P. Dumoulin	75 (–10)
3	5	Kevin Lacroix	75 (–10)
6	6	Ryan Vargas	74 (–11)
2	7	Jason Hathaway	70 (–15)
7	8	Mathieu Kingsbury	68 (–17)
12	9	Larry Jackson	57 (–28)
12	10	Brent Wheller	54 (–31)

Previous race: 2025 Clarington 200	NASCAR Canada Series; 2025 season	Next race: 2025 NAPA 300
