= Sunset Speedway =

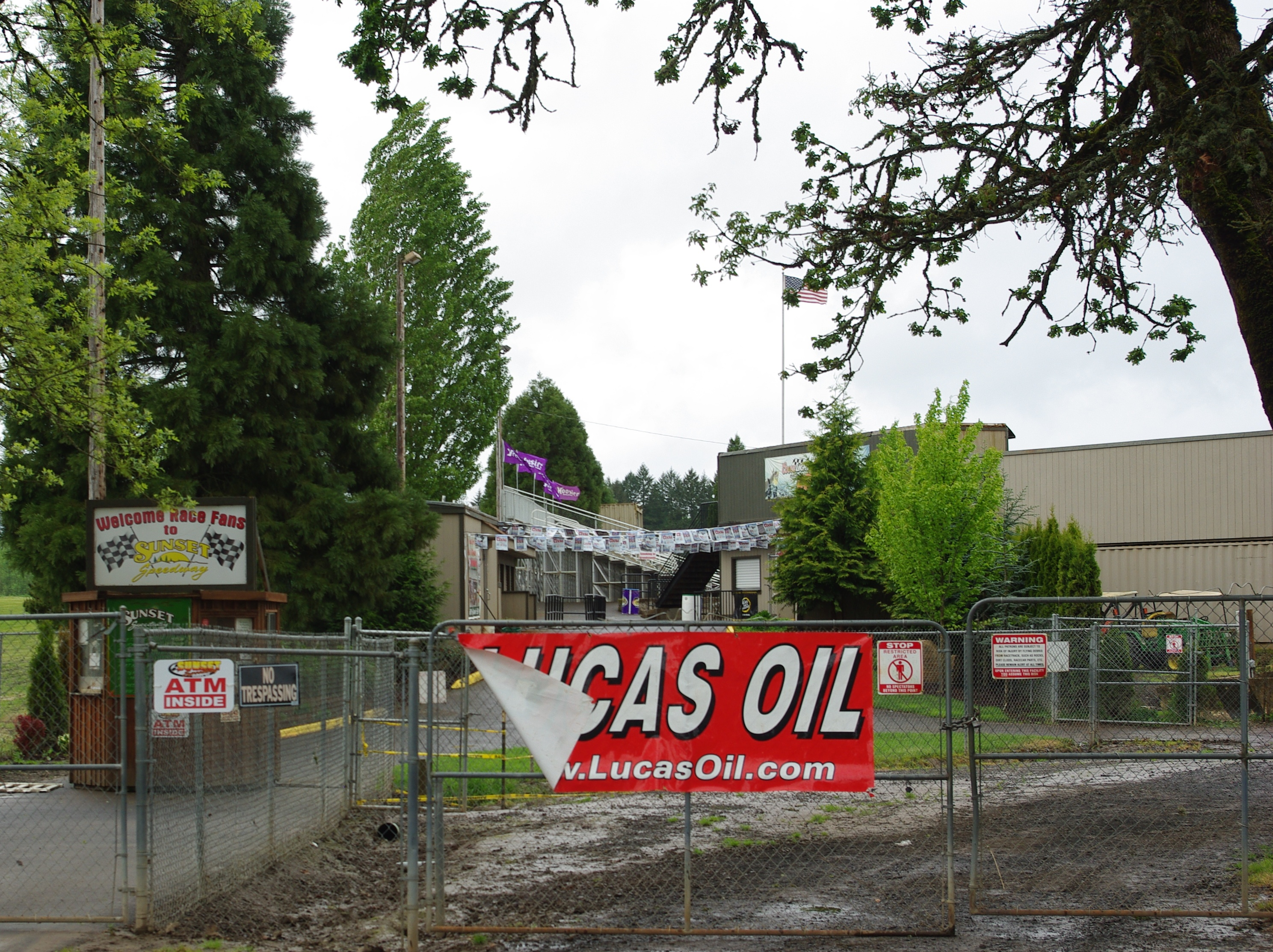
- Entrance in 2014
- Location: Banks, Oregon
- Coordinates: 45.6125°N 123.1184°W
- Opened: 1986
- Surface: clay
- Length: .25 miles

Sunset Speedway is a .25-mile (0.40 km), dirt oval track in Banks in the U.S. state of Oregon. Opened in 1986, races are held from April through September. Racing classes include IMCA Modifieds, Northwest Wingless Tour Sprints, Street Stocks, NW Extreme Sprints, NW Extreme Late Models, USAC Midgets, WRS Late Model Lites, ASCS Sprints, Dwarfs, and 4-Bees among others.

== History ==
After a dispute with organizers of the Washington County Fair, a track was established at Banks' Sunset Park in 1986. The next year the track added bleachers for use during both races and demolition derbies. In the past the track has also been used for tractor pulls and combine demolition derbies. Mike McCann bought the track in July 1997, and over the next year added bleachers and converted the track to a clay surface.

In 2004, long-time racer Doug Walters purchased 40% of the track from McCann, and the two began to make more improvements such as permanent restrooms and better concession stands. The city council then questioned some of those improvements the next year as no permits had been obtained for the work. Owner Doug Walters died in 2008. A commercial for Intel was filmed at the speedway in July 2013 featuring monster trucks.
