= IWK 250 =

- Venue: Riverside International Speedway
- Corporate sponsor: Steve Lewis Auto Body
- First race: 1977
- Distance: 83.25 miles (134 km)
- Laps: 250
- Previous names: CHFX 250 (1977–1978); Gatorade 250 (1979); No. 7 Lights 250 (1980); Dairy Queen 250 (1981); Riverside 250 (1986, 1991–1992); Labatt Blue Riverside 250 (1987), (1989-1990); GM Goodwrench 250 (1993); Bud GM Goodwrench 250 (1994); Bud Thunder 250 (1995); Pioneer Coal 250 (1996–1999); Fall Foliage 250 (2006); IWK 250 (2007-Present)

The IWK 250 is a 250-lap late model stock car race held annually at the third-mile Riverside International Speedway in James River, Nova Scotia.

In 2007 the annual 250 mile race at the track was repurposed to raise money and garner support for the IWK Health Centre in Halifax, Nova Scotia. It has since become one of the premier Pro Stock races in North America, attracting national attention, as well as some of the sport's top drivers, including NASCAR champions Brad Keselowski, Matt Crafton, and Joey Logano, V8 Supercars champion Marcos Ambrose, and American short track racing star Bubba Pollard.

Prior to the 2015 IWK 250 the event has raised over $250,000 for the IWK.

== History ==
=== Early history ===
The first 250 was an unsanctioned race that took place in 1977 under track promoters Jerry Lawrence and Ron King, the event would be the first 250 lap race in all of Atlantic Canada. Ontario's Billy Watson picked up the win in that first event.

From 1979 to 1981 the race was won by Don Biederman, who is best known as being the first Canadian driver to run a full season in the NASCAR Grand National Series. The 1981 race was the last event that was not sanctioned by a touring series. The race then took a five-year hiatus from before returning in 1986 under MASCAR sanctioning, with Greg Sewart winning the first race back. John Chisholm sold the track to Eric Vandaalen in 1989.

The 1991 and 1992 editions of the 250, then known as the Riverside 250, were sanctioned by the American Canadian Tour. Both these events were run by another Canadian racing legend, Junior Hanley.

1993 saw the return of MASCAR sanctioning, with Greg Sewart taking his second win overall in the event. MASCAR sanctioning would continue for the remainder of the 1999 races. Scott Fraser dominated the event during this time, winning five consecutive races from 1994 to 1998.

Following the 1999 running of the 250 the track had fallen into such disrepair that the event was indefinitely cancelled until 2006 when track owner Eric Vandaalen suddenly died and John Chisholm repurchased the track from Vandaalen's estate and completely rebuilt it.

=== 2007 IWK 250 ===
The 2007 IWK 250 was the first event to be run in support of the IWK Health Centre and with that track promoters wanted to have a big name driver headline the event.

NASCAR Hall of Fame inductee Bill Elliott was tapped to be that driver. According to track staff, Riverside paid an extra premium on April 27, 2007, to guarantee his inclusion in the race and heavily promoted his involvement in the race with all the promotional material revolving around Elliott, right down to the design on the tickets. However, just ten days before the race Elliott informed Riverside that he would not be attending via written notice, saying he would be "too busy" to attend, and adding "There is no way I am going to Nova Scotia to race that weekend. Now stop bugging me." This decision by Elliott received a tremendous amount of criticism from fans and media, as it was seen as Elliott bailing on a charity race, with some going as far as encouraging fans to contact Elliott directly to voice their displeasure.

This led to Elliott releasing a formal statement via Motorsports Management International;

"I steadfastly deny that there was ever a final contract, spoken or written, in which I agreed to both attend and compete in the event at the Riverside International Speedway. Riverside International Speedway officials contacted my representatives in April 2007 to gauge my interest in competing in this event. Race officials sent a lengthy appearance schedule in conjunction with the event. Although my family and I strongly considered attending the event, on May 15th we communicated to race officials that we were leaning against attending, due in large part to the excessive amount of travel time the commitment would involve.

Speedway and event officials were notified in writing on June 5th, 2007 that I had declined their offer to participate in the event. My family and I are disappointed that speedway and event officials continue to portray us in a negative light as a result of this matter."

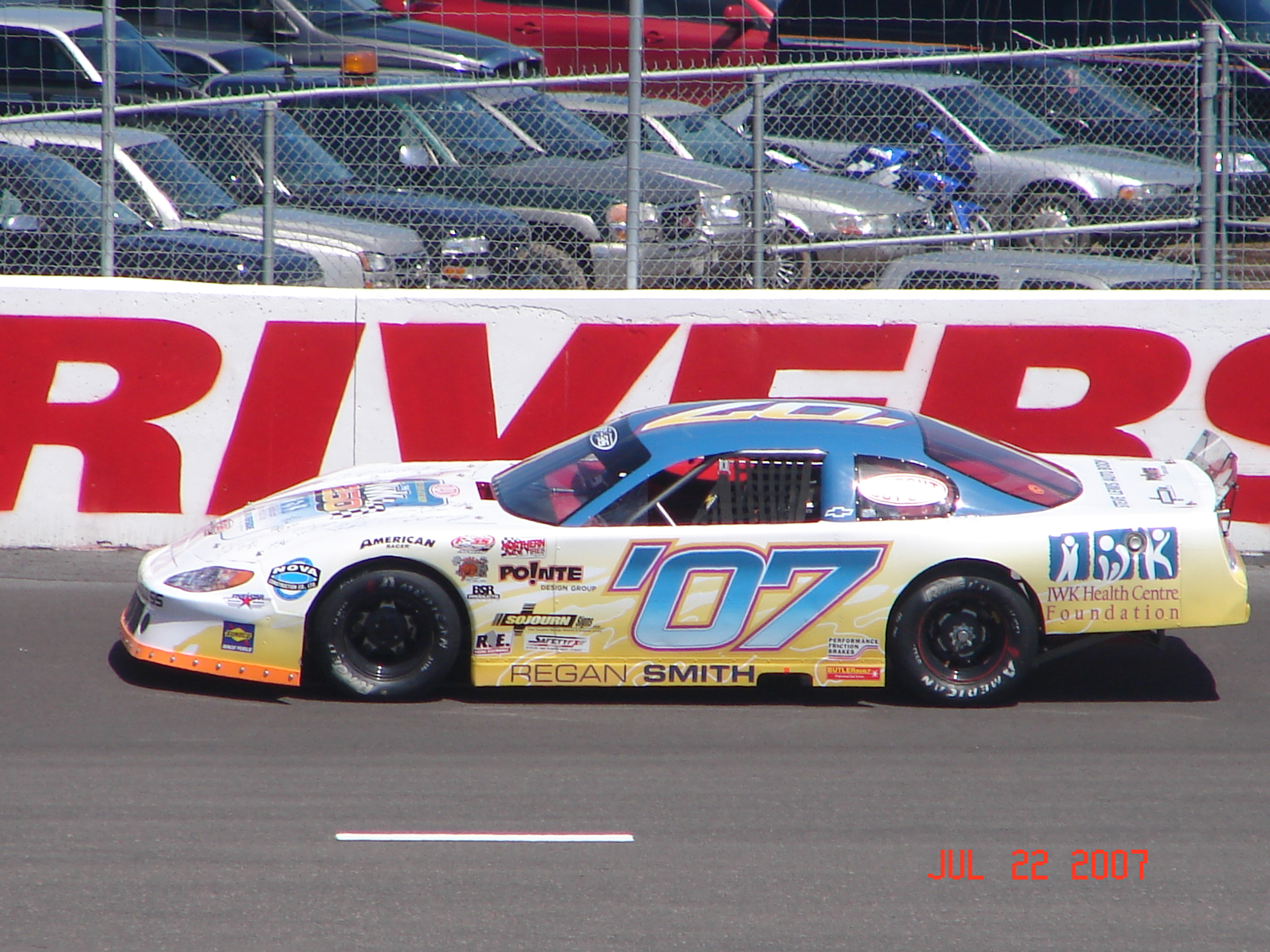
Regan Smith on the backstretch during practice for the 2007 IWK 250

The track eventually secured both Regan Smith and Ricky Craven as Elliott's replacement. This would be the last time that Riverside would promote their celebrity driver so heavily in race promotional activities.

Ricky Craven was involved in an early crash with teammate Donald Chisholm, and left the track during the half way break to get a head start home. The event was dominated by veteran racing father and son Mike and Ben Rowe who held off a hard charging Regan Smith to finish 1–2 respectively.

This would mark the only time the podium was dominated by American-born drivers, with the Rowe family hailing from Maine, and Smith coming from New York. The next year the race was sanctioned by the Maritime Pro Stock Tour in an attempt to get fans more excited about the local drivers.

=== 2008 IWK 250 ===
The 2008 IWK 250 featured the return of Regan Smith, who finished third the previous year, along with Dale Earnhardt Inc. teammate Aric Almirola as the tracks celebrity drivers. Smith became the first and to date only driver who has competed in NASCAR's national touring series to claim victory in the event, while Almirola finished seventh. Shawn Turple and Mike MacKenzie joined Smith on the podium.

=== 2013 IWK 250 ===
The 2013 running of the IWK 250 attracted their biggest named driver yet when it was announced that defending NASCAR Sprint Cup Series Champion Brad Keselowski made the trip to Nova Scotia to partake in the event. Keselowski brought with him Brad Keselowski Racing development driver Austin Theriault to join him at the event.

Before the race, track owner and philanthropist John Chisholm donated $1 million to support the development of a new state-of-the-art Neonatal Intensive Care Unit (NICU) at the IWK.

Hometown favourite Donald Chisholm had the fastest time in time trials with a time of 14.399 seconds, while Jonathan Hicken won the Dash for Cash, putting him on the pole. Brad Keselowski led 152 laps in the race giving him the Linde Most Laps Led award. Keselowski looked primed to pick up the win until Shawn Tucker laid the bump-and-run with 25 laps remaining, allowing Chisholm to get by as well. The podium spots stayed as such until the end, with Kent Vincent finishing fourth and Theriault finishing fifth to round out the top five.

=== 2014 IWK 250 ===
The 2014 IWK 250 was dedicated to John Chisholm, who died just a couple of weeks before the event.

It was announced in June that defending NASCAR Camping World Truck Series Champion Matt Crafton would be entering the event.

Donald Chisholm dominated the race, leading 218 of 250 laps, before John Flemming stole the win, beating Chisholm on a restart with three laps to go. Flemming would become the first driver to win two 250s in the IWK era.

=== 2015 IWK 250 ===
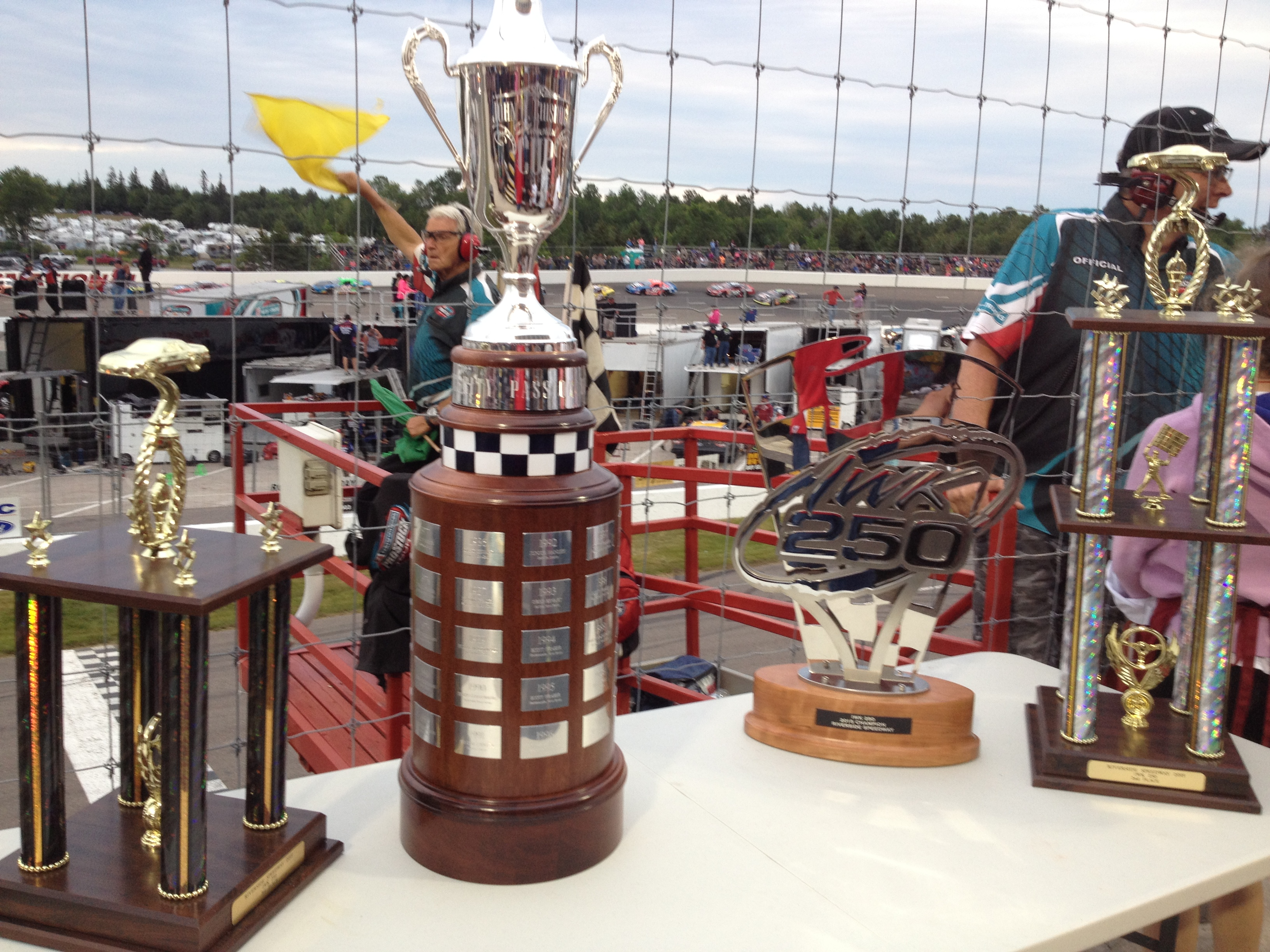
From left to right: IWK 250 3rd Place Trophy, John W. Chisholm Memorial Cup, IWK 250 Trophy Presented by Steve Lewis Auto Body, IWK 250 2nd Place Trophy

Prior to the 2015 IWK 250 Riverside unveiled the John W. Chisholm Memorial Cup. Past 250 winners such as John Flemming, Rollie MacDonald, Frank Fraser, Wayne Smith and Kent Vincent, along with the Chisholm Family attended the unveiling.

Once against Matt Crafton would be returning to Riverside in a second attempt at the 250, he would be joined by American short track ace Jeff Fultz, who was in Rollie MacDonald's #13.

The race was a controversial one with multiple drivers running up front being black flagged for avoidable contact and jumping the start. Donald Chisholm looked like the favourite, recovering from an early spin to take the lead, Fultz took him out on a restart following a rain delay. Kent Vincent improbably went on to win his second IWK 250 in a thrilling late race battle with rookie D.J. Casey, also receiving the John W. Chisholm Memorial Cup for the first time post-race.

Vincent's win was overshadowed however by a post-race confrontation between Fultz and Chisholm's teammate George Koszkulics. Koszkulics followed Fultz around the track for multiple laps and down pit road after the race. The two came to a stop behind the technical inspection shed, where Koszkulics forcibly removed Fultz from his car and landed multiple punches before track security was called to break up the pair.

=== 2025 IWK 250 ===
In 2025, the track introduced the "Dash 4 Cash," a 75-lap, $5,000-to-win non-points "prelude" race held on the Wednesday before the IWK 250. The race featured a unique qualifying format, with time trials and a modified pit stop.

Cory Hall, making his first IWK 250 start as a former race-winning crew chief, won the pole and the race, and his dominance continued on Saturday across all IWK 250 action.

On Saturday, Hall won the Hanley Cup as the fastest qualifier in IWK 250 time trials. He went on to win his heat race and lead 249 of 250 laps in the main event, earning over $30,000 in prize money.

The race was one of the fastest in history, which took one hour and 24 minutes. Only two restarts occurred, with one after an early single-car incident and the other following a mid-race competition caution.

After years of welcoming NASCAR drivers as the event's celebrity driver, the track secured American short track racing superstar Bubba Pollard for the 2025 running. In his first IWK 250 attempt, Pollard finished sixth.

Notably, Pollard was also joined by 2020 NASCAR Canada Series champion Jason Hathaway. In his third IWK 250 start, his first since 2018, Hathaway finished 13th.

== Race results ==
IWK 250 Presented by Steve Lewis Auto Body Winners
Year	Series	Race title	No.	Make	Winner	Team
1977	Open	CHFX 250			Billy Watson	
1978	Open	CHFX 250			Frank Fraser	
1979	Open	Gatorade 250			Don Biederman	
1980	Open	No. 7 Lights 250			Don Biederman	
1981	Open	Dairy Queen 250			Don Biederman	
1986	MASCAR	Riverside 250			Greg Sewart	
1987	MASCAR	Labatt Blue Riverside 250			Frank Fraser	
1989	MASCAR	Labatt Blue Riverside 250			Rollie MacDonald	
1990	MASCAR	Labatt Blue Riverside 250			Terry Clattenburg	
1991	American Canadian Tour	Riverside 250			Junior Hanley	
1992	American Canadian Tour	Riverside 250			Junior Hanley	
1993	MASCAR	GM Goodwrench 250			Greg Sewart	
1994	MASCAR	Bud GM Goodwrench 250			Scott Fraser	Scott Fraser Racing
1995	MASCAR	Bud Thunder 250			Scott Fraser	Scott Fraser Racing
1996	MASCAR	Pioneer Coal 250			Scott Fraser	Scott Fraser Racing
1997	MASCAR	Pioneer Coal 250			Scott Fraser	Scott Fraser Racing
1998	MASCAR	Pioneer Coal 250	00		Scott Fraser	Scott Fraser Racing
1999	MASCAR	Pioneer Coal 250	02		Mike MacKenzie	
2006	Pro All Stars Series	Fall Foliage 250	4	Chevrolet	Ben Rowe	Richard Moody Racing
2007	Pro All Stars Series	IWK 250	2	Chevrolet	Mike Rowe	P.T. Watts Racing
2008	Maritime Pro Stock Tour	IWK 250	08	Chevrolet	Regan Smith	NOVA Racing
2009	Maritime Pro Stock Tour	IWK 250	44	Chevrolet	Wayne Smith	Oval Outlaw Racing
2010	Maritime Pro Stock Tour	IWK 250	8	Dodge	Kent Vincent	KV Racing
2011	Maritime Pro Stock Tour	IWK 250	18	Chevrolet	Darren MacKinnon	
2012	Maritime Pro Stock Tour	IWK 250	97	Dodge	John Flemming	Flemming Motorsports
2013	Maritime Pro Stock Tour	IWK 250	52	Chevrolet	Shawn Tucker	Tucker Racing
2014	Maritime Pro Stock Tour	IWK 250	97	Dodge	John Flemming	Flemming Motorsports
2015	Maritime Pro Stock Tour	IWK 250 Presented by Steve Lewis Auto Body	8	Dodge	Kent Vincent	KV Racing
2016	Maritime Pro Stock Tour	IWK 250 Presented by Steve Lewis Auto Body	89	Ford	Donald Chisholm	NOVA Racing
2017	Maritime Pro Stock Tour	IWK 250 Presented by Steve Lewis Auto Body	67	Chevrolet	Dylan Blenkhorn	Blenkhorn Racing
2018	Maritime Pro Stock Tour	IWK 250 Presented by Steve Lewis Auto Body	18w	Toyota	Kenny Wallace	NOVA Racing
2019	Maritime Pro Stock Tour	IWK 250 Presented by Steve Lewis Auto Body	13	Chevrolet	Cassius Clark	King Racing
2020	Maritime Pro Stock Tour	IWK 250 Presented by Steve Lewis Auto Body	Cancelled due to COVID-19 pandemic			
2021	Maritime Pro Stock Tour	IWK 250 Presented by Steve Lewis Auto Body	Cancelled due to COVID-19 pandemic			
2022	Maritime Pro Stock Tour	IWK 250 Presented by Steve Lewis Auto Body	29	Dodge	Greg Proude	Atlantic Dodge Dealers
2023	Maritime Pro Stock Tour	IWK 250 Presented by Steve Lewis Auto Body	99		Craig Slaunwhite	RS Dean Holdings, RJ Motorsports
2024	Maritime Pro Stock Tour	IWK 250 Presented by Steve Lewis Auto Body	99		Craig Slaunwhite	RS Dean Holdings, Archibald Drilling & Blasting
2025	Maritime Pro Stock Tour	IWK 250 Presented by Steve Lewis Auto Body	83		Cory Hall	Kris Fournier RE/MAX, Mid-Coast Excavation Inc., King Competition, PiccottCare
2026	Maritime Pro Stock Tour	IWK 250 Presented by Steve Lewis Auto Body	08		Nicholas Naugle	Brycon Construction
