= Scott Fraser (racing driver) =

Canadian racing car driver (1970-2004)

- Nationality: Canadian
- Born: October 20, 1970 Halifax, Nova Scotia, Canada
- Died: March 20, 2004 (aged 33) Wentworth, Nova Scotia, Canada

Championship titles
- 1996, 1998 1999 1994, 1995, 1996, 1997, 1998: MASCAR; International Pro Stock Challenge Champion; Riverside 250 winner

Awards
- 1999 2006 2007 2010 2014 2014: Nova Scotia Male Athlete of the Year; Maritime Motorsports Hall of Fame; Canadian Motorsport Hall of Fame; Truro Sports Hall of Fame; Nova Scotia Sport Hall of Fame; Riverside Wall of Fame

Scott Andrew Fraser (October 20, 1970 – March 20, 2004) was a Canadian professional racing car driver from Shubenacadie, Nova Scotia. Fraser was considered by many to be one of the best stock car racers in Canada.

== Racing career ==
=== Early career ===
Fraser made his racing debut in the street stock division at Onslow Speedway in Truro, Nova Scotia at the age of 16, setting the record for wins in a season. He ran off and on at Onslow for the next four seasons.

In 1992, Fraser moved on to the Open-Wheel Modified division at Scotia Speedworld in Enfield, Nova Scotia. In his rookie season he won the series championship.

Between 1993 and 1994, Fraser ran three American Canadian Tour races, scoring top fives in all three races, including a win at Scotia Speedworld.

=== MASCAR ===
Fraser made his MASCAR debut at the 1991 Moosehead Grand Prix. Fraser was running up front in the event after starting third in the MASCAR Division before being forced out of the race with transmission issues. The next season, he entered the race for the second straight year, this time finishing second.

From 1994 to 1998, Fraser won five straight Riverside 250's at Riverside International Speedway, setting a race record for both most wins and for consecutive wins.

In 1996, Fraser had what was arguably the best season in the history of Maritime racing, winning 12 of 15 races, including 9 straight, cruising to his first MASCAR championship. He led 58.9% of the total laps run in the 1996 season.

The next season, Fraser ran a limited MASCAR schedule, winning four of the six races he entered.

Fraser returned to the series full-time in 1998, putting up an average finish of 2.7, while winning 6 of 13 races on his way to his second career MASCAR championship.

=== King Racing ===
At the end of the 1998 season, Fraser decided to partner with Rollie MacDonald forming King Racing. Fraser drove the car, while MacDonald served as team owner and car chief.

In February 1999, the team entered the World Series of Asphalt Stock Car Racing at New Smyrna Speedway in New Smyrna, Florida. The World Series of Asphalt Stock Car Racing consisted of ten straight nights of races. Fraser set the fast time in five and won two of the ten main events, finishing third in the overall points standings.

The team also entered the 1999 New Hampshire 100 NASCAR Busch North Series race at New Hampshire International Speedway. Fraser finished the race 43rd after experience brake failure on lap 33.

The pair returned to Nova Scotia to regroup, and decided to enter the upstart International Pro Stock Challenge (IPSC), winning the six-race championship.

==== ASA National Tour ====
In 1999, Fraser and MacDonald put together an American Speed Association (ASA) team in just six months, and had a car ready to run a partial schedule for the 2000 National Tour season. The team started out strong, starting on the outside pole at Chicago Motor Speedway. Fraser led for 19 laps on his way to an eighth-place finish. They recorded four top tens and two top-fives in their first four starts in the series, including a career best third-place finish at the Milwaukee Mile in August. They raced two more times in 2000, finishing 11th at Indianapolis Raceway Park and 33rd at Gateway Motorsports Park, where the team suffered their first DNF due to a faulty wheel bearing.

With their initial success, the team decided to go full-time in 2001. The season started out great, with three top five finishes in their first four starts. Unfortunately the wheels fell off the campaign after that. Starting at Concord Speedway a series of five straight DNF's, including three crashes damaged their only car beyond the point where it could be repaired on the road. The final nail in the coffin came in an accident at Chicago Motor Speedway, the track Fraser made his impressive debut. The team returned to Nova Scotia dejected and out of money.

Soon after a friend of Fraser's started the "Fans of Fraser" campaign to raise money to get the team back onto the racetrack. In total, they raised more than $40,000, selling lap sponsorships at $100 a piece. This included help from NASCAR legend Buddy Baker, who was a big fan of Fraser. They were able to compete in two more races under the "Fans of Fraser" sponsorship, finishing 32nd at Memphis Motorsports Park, and 37th at Indianapolis Raceway Park, exiting both races early with rear end problems.

==== Maritime Pro Stock Tour ====
Fraser and King Racing entered the Maritime Pro Stock Tour full-time in 2003 with the intention of racing for the championship. Fraser won two of the 11 races on the schedule, finishing third in the final point standings.

== Car ownership ==
Before teaming with Rollie MacDonald following the 1998 season, Fraser primarily raced cars coming out of his own shop. He learned how to build and work on race cars from Canadian racing legend Junior Hanley as well as his father Frank.

In 1996, four of the top ten cars in the MASCAR championship standings came out of the Scott Fraser racing shop.

Following his death in 2004, Scott Fraser Racing continued on with Frank now running the team.

== Awards ==
- He was named the Nova Scotia Male Athlete of the Year in 1999.
- He was posthumously inducted Maritime Motorsports Hall of Fame in 2006.
- He was posthumously inducted Canadian Motorsport Hall of Fame in 2007.
- He was posthumously inducted Colchester Sports Heritage Hall of Fame in 2010.
- He was posthumously inducted Truro Sports Hall of Fame 2010.
- He was posthumously inducted Nova Scotia Sport Hall of Fame in 2014.
- His number 00 was retired series wide by the Maritime Pro Stock Tour in 2014.

== Personal life ==
Fraser is the son of Maritime racing legend Frank Fraser and wife Grace. His brother Frank, Jr. is also an accomplished stock car racer.

== Death ==
Fraser succumb to injuries sustained in an accident while snowmobiling with friends in Wentworth, Nova Scotia on March 20, 2004.

Ron Miller, C.E.O. Performance PR Plus Inc., who represented NASCAR stars Jeff Gordon and Kasey Kahne at the time, released the following statement upon hearing the news of Fraser's death; "This is one of the more saddening times I have experienced. Not only have we lost a great race car driver but a kind and wonderful person as well. I have represented numerous drivers, and Scott was as talented as many of those in the top echelon of NASCAR right now. I extend my deepest sympathy to Scott's family and personal friends."

== Motorsports career results ==
=== NASCAR ===
(key) (Bold – Pole position awarded by qualifying time. Italics – Pole position earned by points standings or practice time. * – Most laps led.)

==== Busch North ====
NASCAR Busch North Series results
Year	Team	No.	Make	1	2	3	4	5	6	7	8	9	10	11	12	13	14	15	16	17	18	19	20	Rank	Points
1999	King Racing	08	Chevy	LEE	RPS	NHA	THO	NAZ	HIS	BEE	JEN	GLN	STA	NHA	NAZ	STA	NHA	GLN	STA	THU	BEE	NHA; 43	LRP	**89th**	**34**

=== ASA ===
==== National Tour ====
ASA National Tour results
Year	Team	No.	Make	1	2	3	4	5	6	7	8	9	10	11	12	13	14	15	16	17	18	19	20	Rank	Points
2000	King Racing	00	Chevy	USA	LNS	HIC	MMS	FSN	LOU	HAW	I70	CMS; 8	SAL	TOL; 8	JEN; 5	HAW	MAD	MLW; 3	MIN	MEM	IRP; 11	WIN	GTY; 33	**31st**	**878**
2001	King Racing	00	Chevy	STA; 29	IRW; 4	USA; 5	SBO; 5	HAW; 29	MMS; 10	CON; 24	FSN; 31	I70; 32	TOL; 31	CMS; 29	BLN	SAL	HAW	MAD	JEN	MSF	MEM; 32	WIN	IRP; 37	**23rd**	**1352**

Sporting positions
Preceded by Greg Sewart; Dave Gorveatt	MASCAR Champion; 1996; 1998	Succeeded by Dave Gorveatt; Wayne Smith
Achievements
Preceded by Greg Sewart	Riverside 250 Winner; 1994, 1995, 1996, 1997, 1998	Succeeded by Mike MacKenzie
