= Maritime Pro Stock Tour =

Canadian annual automotive racing event

Maritime Pro Stock Tour Limited
- Sport: Stock car racing
- Category: Auto racing
- Jurisdiction: (Nova Scotia) Nova Scotia (New Brunswick) New Brunswick; Prince Edward Island
- Abbreviation: MPST or FGIPST
- Headquarters: Beaver Bank, Nova Scotia
- Sponsor: Fort Garry Industries

Official website
- www.maritimeprostocktour.com
- (Canada)

The Maritime Pro Stock Tour (commonly known as the Fort Garry Industries Pro Stock Tour due to a sponsorship deal with Fort Garry Industries) is an annual stock car auto racing tour located in the Maritime provinces of Canada.

== History ==
The Maritime Pro Stock Tour was founded in 2001 to provide short track racing in the Maritime provinces and is the successor to the MASCAR Tour. It is now known as the Fort Garry Industries Pro Stock Tour and was previously known as the CARQUEST Pro Stock Tour from 2001 to 2010, the Parts for Trucks Pro Stock Tour from 2011 to 2020, and the East Coast International Pro Stock Tour from 2021 to 2024.

The tour is known as one of the best in Canada and is recognized as one of the healthiest touring series in North America. Each summer the Maritime Pro Stock Tour draws some of the largest crowds of any summer sport in the Maritimes.

On August 4, 2013, driver Mike Stevens was in involved in a four car accident in with two laps remaining in the Exit Realty 100 at Oyster Bed Speedway in Oyster Bed Bridge, P.E.I. Stevens' car flipped onto its roof, but Stevens appeared to be unhurt. As Stevens remained upside down he began to remove his safety equipment, and in his effort he inadvertently strangled himself. The race was stopped immediately and Stevens was transferred to a local hospital where he was pronounced dead.

== Maritime Pro Stock Tour tracks ==
The tour currently races on four different paved oval short tracks throughout the Maritimes; Riverside International Speedway and Scotia Speedworld in Nova Scotia, Petty International Raceway in New Brunswick and Oyster Bed Speedway in Prince Edward Island.

The track formerly raced at Speedway 660 in New Brunswick from 2001 to 2017 and 2023 to 2024.

Riverside International Speedway was designed after the famed Bristol Motor Speedway in Bristol, Tennessee, making it a favourite among fans and competitors.

== IWK 250 ==
Since 2008 the series has played host to the IWK 250 at Riverside International Speedway in support of the IWK Health Centre in Halifax, Nova Scotia, which has become their Race. The IWK 250 has attracted some of NASCAR's stars, including NASCAR Hall of Fame inductee Mark Martin, 2012 NASCAR Cup Series champion Brad Keselowski, two-time NASCAR Craftsman Truck Series champion Matt Crafton, three-time NASCAR Cup Series champion Joey Logano, and 2024 NASCAR Cup Series Rookie of the Year Carson Hocevar.

In 2008, the first year the event was held as part of the Maritime Pro Stock Tour, Regan Smith became the first and to date only NASCAR regular to claim victory in the event.

== 2026 Maritime Pro Stock Tour Schedule ==
Date	Event	Track	Location
May 23	Kenny U-Pull 150	Scotia Speedworld	Goffs, Nova Scotia
June 6	Mr. Lube + Tires 150	Petty International Raceway	River Glade, New Brunswick
June 20	Nova Truck Centres 150	Scotia Speedworld	Goffs, Nova Scotia
June 27	Fort Garry Industries 150	Riverside International Speedway	Antigonish, Nova Scotia
July 18	IWK 250	Riverside International Speedway	Antigonish, Nova Scotia
July 25	BJ's Truck Centre 150	Oyster Bed Speedway	Oyster Bed Bridge, Prince Edward Island
August 8	Summer Clash 250 presented by Superior Foundations & Atlantic Tiltload	Scotia Speedworld	Goffs, Nova Scotia
August 29	Mr. Lube + Tires 150	Oyster Bed Speedway	Oyster Bed Bridge, Prince Edward Island
September 12	TBA 150	Riverside International Speedway	Antigonish, Nova Scotia
September 26	Mr. Lube + Tires 200	Scotia Speedworld	Goffs, Nova Scotia

== List of tour champions ==
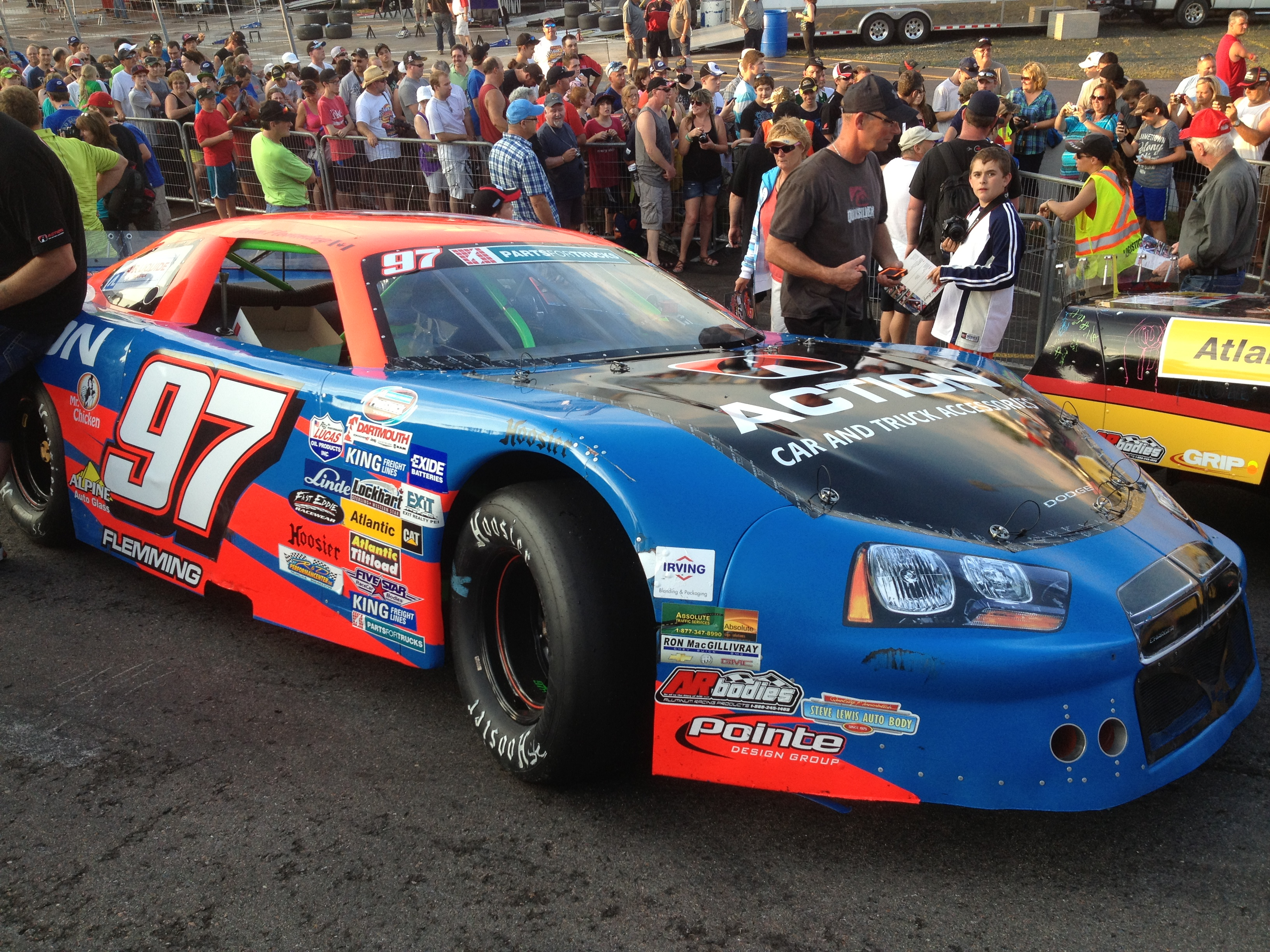
Five-time series champion John Flemming's car prior to the start of the 2013 IWK 250

Maritime Pro Stock Tour Champions
Year	No.	Make	Champion	Team	Hometown	Points
2001	44	Chevy	Wayne Smith	Oval Outlaw Racing	Timberlea, NS	1235
2002	97	Dodge	John Flemming	Flemming Motorsports	Halifax, NS	2251
2003	97	Dodge	John Flemming	Flemming Motorsports	Halifax, NS	2215
2004	52	Chevy	Shawn Tucker	Tucker Racing	Fredericton, NB	2160
2005	13	Chevy	Rollie MacDonald	King Racing	Pictou, NS	2161
2006	97	Dodge	John Flemming	Flemming Motorsports	Halifax, NS	2174
2007	52	Chevy	Shawn Tucker	Tucker Racing	Fredericton, NB	1955
2008	44	Chevy	Wayne Smith	Oval Outlaw Racing	Timberlea, NS	2184
2009	0	Chevy	Shawn Turple	Steven Henderson	Enfield, NS	2171
2010	52	Chevy	Shawn Tucker	Tucker Racing	Fredericton, NB	2161
2011	44	Chevy	Wayne Smith	Oval Outlaw Racing	Timberlea, NS	2335
2012	0	Chevy	Shawn Turple	Steven Henderson	Enfield, NS	2318
2013	97	Dodge	John Flemming	Flemming Motorsports	Halifax, NS	2372
2014	97	Dodge	John Flemming	Flemming Motorsports	Halifax, NS	2364
2015	89	Ford	Donald Chisholm	NOVA Racing	Antigonish, NS	2348
2016	53	Chevy	Cole Butcher	Butcher Racing	Porters Lake, NS	2358
2017	0	Chevy	Shawn Turple	Steven Henderson	Enfield, NS	2467
2018	53	Chevy	Cole Butcher	Butcher Racing	Porters Lake, NS	2500
2019	67	Chevy	Dylan Blenkhorn	Blenkhorn Racing	Truro, NS	2456
2020	Season cancelled due to COVID-19 pandemic					
2021	99	Chevy	Craig Slaunwhite	Slaunwhite Racing	Terence Bay, NS	1868
2022	99	Chevy	Craig Slaunwhite	Slaunwhite Racing	Terence Bay, NS	2444
2023	99	Chevy	Craig Slaunwhite	Slaunwhite Racing	Terence Bay, NS	2267
2024	54	Chevy	Jarrett Butcher	Butcher Racing	Porters Lake, NS	2041
2025	2	Chevy	Ashton Tucker	Brad Silliker Motorsports	Miramichi, NB	2052

== Race results ==
2013 Parts for Trucks Pro Stock Tour Results
Date	Event	Track	Winner	King Freight Dash for Cash	Dartmouth Dodge Heat Winners	Exide Batteries Rookie Of The Race	Atlantic Tiltload Time Trials
May 19	Lucas Oil 150	Scotia Speedworld	John Flemming	Shawn Turple	Greg Proude George Koszkulics Donald Chisholm	Dylan Blenkhorn	John Flemming
June 15	Ron MacGillivray Chevrolet Buick GMC 150	Riverside International Speedway	Donald Chisholm	N/A^{1}	Donald Chisholm Greg Proude George Koszkulics	Dylan Blenkhorn	N/A^{1}
June 22	Lockhart Truck Center 150	Scotia Speedworld	John Flemming	John Flemming	Shawn Turple George Koszkulics	Cole Butcher	John Flemming
June 30	Lucas Oil 150	Petty International Raceway	Dylan Gosbee	John Flemming	Craig Slaunwhite Dylan Gosbee	Denver Foran	Jonathan Hicken
July 6	Irving Blending & Packaging 100	Speedway 660	John Flemming	Dave O'Blenis	Dylan Blenkhorn Steve Halpin	Denver Foran	Dave O'Blenis
July 13	Fast Eddie Racewear 100	Petty International Raceway	Shawn Tucker	Dylan Gosbee	Shawn Turple Craig Slaunwhite	Cole Butcher	John Flemming
July 20	IWK 250	Riverside International Speedway	Shawn Tucker	Jonathan Hicken	Cole Butcher Brad Eddy Dylan Gosbee	Cole Butcher	Donald Chisholm
Aug 3	Exit Realty PEI 100	Oyster Bed Speedway	John Flemming	Kent Vincent	Darren MacKinnon Craig Slaunwhite	Dylan Blenkhorn	John Flemming
Aug 10	Atlantic Cat 250	Scotia Speedworld	Craig Slaunwhite	Craig Slaunwhite	Dylan Blenkhorn Donald Chisholm	Dylan Blenkhorn	Ben Rowe
Aug 24	Parts for Trucks 150	Petty International Raceway	Shawn Tucker	Dylan Gosbee	Dylan Blenkhorn Kent Vincent	Dylan Blenkhorn	Darren MacKinnon
Sept 7	Lucas Oil 100	Riverside International Speedway	Shawn Tucker	Shawn Tucker	Darren MacKinnon George Koszkulics	Dylan Blenkhorn	John Flemming
Sept 14	Dartmouth Dodge 200	Scotia Speedworld	Shawn Turple	Shawn Turple	Darren MacKinnon Dylan Blenkhorn	Cole Butcher	Craig Slaunwhite

2014 Parts for Trucks Pro Stock Tour Results
Date	Event	Track	Winner	King Freight Dash for Cash	Dartmouth Dodge Heat Winners	Linde Most Laps Led	Atlantic Tiltload Time Trials
May 24	Harry Poole Memorial 100 Presented By Lucas Oil	Scotia Speedworld	Shawn Turple	Donald Chisholm	Shawn Tucker Jonathan Hicken	John Flemming	Dylan Blenkhorn
May 31	Irving Oil Blending & Packaging 100	Petty International Speedway	Jonathan Hicken	Jonathan Hicken	Lonnie Sommerville George Koszkulics	Jonathan Hicken	Dylan Blenkhorn
June 21	Lockhart Truck Center 150	Scotia Speedworld	Dylan Blenkhorn	Dylan Blenkhorn	Donald Chisholm Dylan Gosbee	John Flemming	Dylan Blenkhorn
June 28	Lucas Oil 100	Petty International Speedway	Dylan Blenkhorn	Dylan Blenkhorn	Shawn Turple Darren MacKinnon	Greg Proude	John Flemming
July 12	Irving Oil Blending & Packaging 100	Speedway 660	Shawn Turple	John Flemming	Darren MacKinnon Dave O'Blenis	Shawn Tucker	Dylan Blenkhorn
July 19	IWK 250	Riverside International Speedway	John Flemming	Matt Crafton	John Flemming Donald Chisholm George Koszkulics	Donald Chisholm	Matt Crafton
Aug 2	Parts for Trucks 100	Oyster Bed Speedway	Jonathan Hicken	John Flemming	Robbie MacEwan Craig Slaunwhite	John Flemming	Dylan Blenkhorn
Aug 9	Atlantic Cat 250	Scotia Speedworld	Dylan Blenkhorn	Craig Slaunwhite	Cole Butcher Dean Clattenburg	Dylan Blenkhorn	Cassius Clark
Aug 17	Ron MacGillivray Chev Buick GMC 150	Riverside International Speedway	J. R. Fitzpatrick	John Flemming	Shawn Tucker Donald Chisholm	J. R. Fitzpatrick	Cole Butcher
Aug 23	Atlantic Dodge Dealers 150	Petty International Speedway	Jonathan Hicken	Shawn Tucker	Jason Carnahan Sarah McKay	Jonathan Hicken	Jonathan Hicken
Sept 6	Lucas Oil 150	Riverside International Speedway	John Flemming	Jonathan Hicken	Craig Slaunwhite George Koszkulics	Cole Butcher	John Flemming
Sept 13	Dartmouth Dodge 200	Scotia Speedworld	Jonathan Hicken	John Flemming	Donald Chisholm Craig Slaunwhite	John Flemming	John Flemming

2015 Parts for Trucks Pro Stock Tour Results
Date	Event	Track	Winner	King Freight Dash for Cash	Exide Batteries Rookie of the Race	Dartmouth Dodge Heat Winners	Atlantic Tiltload Time Trials
May 24	Lucas Oil 100 (1)	Scotia Speedworld	Dylan Blenkhorn	Cole Butcher	D.J. Casey	George Koszkulics Jerome Kehoe	Dylan Gosbee
May 30	Irving Blending & Packaging 100	Petty International Speedway	Dylan Blenkhorn	Dylan Blenkhorn	DJ Casey	Kent Vincent Donald Chisholm	Dylan Blenkhorn
June 13	Ron MacGillivary 150	Riverside International Speedway	George Koszkulics	Donald Chisholm	Joel Hickox	Greg Proude Robbie MacEwen	Donald Chisholm
June 20	Nova Truck Centers 150	Scotia Speedworld	Cole Butcher	Donald Chisholm	Joel Hickox	Darren MacKinnon DJ Casey	Dylan Belnkhorn
June 27	Linde 100	Petty International Speedway	Darren Mackinnon	Dylan Blenkhorn	DJ Casey	Greg Proude Dylan Gosbee	Shawn Turple
July 4	Cummins 100	Speedway 660	Cole Butcher	Dylan Blenkhorn	DJ Casey	Dylan Gosbee Donald Chisholm	Greg Proude
July 18	IWK 250	Riverside International Speedway	Kent Vincent	Greg Proude	DJ Casey	George Koszkulics Jeff Fultz	Donald Chisholm
Aug 1	Lucas Oil 100 (2)	Oyster Bed Speedway	Darren Mackinnon	Donald Chisholm	DJ Casey	Jonathan Hicken Joel Hickox	Dylan Blenkhorn
Aug 8	Atlantic Cat 250	Scotia Speedworld	Cassius Clark	Dylan Blenkhorn	DJ Casey	Shawn Turple Cale Gale	Cassius Clark
Aug 22	Parts for Trucks 150	Petty International Speedway	Craig Slaunwhite	Craig Slaunwhite	DJ Casey	Donald Chisholm John Flemming	Cole Butcher
Sept 12	Lucas Oil 150	Riverside International Speedway	Donald Chisholm	Donald Chisholm	Joel Hickox	Daryl Mahar Craig Slaunwhite	Donald Chisholm
Sept 19	Dartmouth Dodge 200	Scotia Speedworld	Dylan Blenkhorn	Donald Chisholm	Joel Hickox	John Flemming DJ Casey	Dylan Gosbee

2023 East Coast International Pro Stock Tour Results
Date	Event	Track	Winner
May 20	Cummins 100	Scotia Speedworld	Jarrett Butcher
May 27	East Coast International 150	Speedway 660	Ryan Messer
June 10	RJ Poirier 150	Riverside International Speedway	Nicholas Naugle
June 24	Nova Truck Centres 150	Scotia Speedworld	Nicholas Naugle
July 15	IWK 250	Riverside International Speedway	Craig Slaunwhite
July 22	Fleetrite 150	Petty International Raceway	Ashton Tucker
July 27	BJ's Truck Centre 150	Oyster Bed Speedway	Jarrett Butcher
August 12	Summer Clash 250	Scotia Speedworld	Dylan Blenkhorn
August 19	East Coast International 150	Riverside International Speedway	Jarrett Butcher
September 9	Modern Pumps 150	Riverside International Speedway	Greg Proude
September 16	Tirecraft 200	Scotia Speedworld	Ashton Tucker

2024 East Coast International Pro Stock Tour Results
Date	Event	Track	Winner
May 25	East Coast International 150	Speedway 660	Jarrett Butcher
June 1	Kenny UPull 150	Scotia Speedworld	Jarrett Butcher
June 22	Nova Truck Centres 150	Scotia Speedworld	Nicholas Naugle
June 29	RJ Poirier Heavy Equipment 150	Riverside International Speedway	Danny Chisholm
July 20	IWK 250	Riverside International Speedway	Craig Slaunwhite
July 27	BJ's Truck Centre 150	Oyster Bed Speedway	Robbie MacEwen
August 10	Summer Clash 250	Scotia Speedworld	Austin MacDonald
September 21	Tirecraft 200	Scotia Speedworld	Ashton Tucker
October 6	Mr. Lube + Tires 150	Petty International Raceway	Jarrett Butcher
October 13	Scotia Diesel 155	Riverside International Speedway	Greg Proude

2025 Fort Garry Industries Pro Stock Tour Results
Date	Event	Track	Winner
June 1	Kenny U-Pull 150	Scotia Speedworld	Cory Hall
June 21	Nova Truck Centres 150	Scotia Speedworld	Cory Hall
June 28	Wajax 150	Riverside International Speedway	Ashton Tucker
July 19	IWK 250	Riverside International Speedway	Cory Hall
July 26	BJ's Truck Centre 150	Oyster Bed Speedway	Cory Hall
August 9	Summer Clash 250	Scotia Speedworld	Craig Slaunwhite
August 16	Dulux Paints 150	Riverside International Speedway	Cory Hall
September 6	Mr. Lube + Tires 150	Oyster Bed Speedway	Cory Hall
September 20	Mr. Lube + Tires 200	Scotia Speedworld	Ashton Tucker
October 4	Mr. Lube + Tires 150	Petty International Raceway	Ashton Tucker

*2026 Fort Garry Industries Pro Stock Tour Results
Date	Event	Track	Winner
May 23	Kenny U-Pull 150	Scotia Speedworld	Gage Gilby
June 6	Mr. Lube + Tires 150	Petty International Raceway	Ashton Tucker
June 20	Nova Truck Centres 150	Scotia Speedworld	Nicholas Naugle
June 27	Fort Garry Industries 150	Riverside International Speedway	Nicholas Naugle
July 18	IWK 250	Riverside International Speedway	Nicholas Naugle
July 25	BJ's Truck Centre 150	Oyster Bed Speedway	Cory Hall

^{*} Season still in progress
^{**} Season upcoming
^{1} Rained out

== Title sponsors ==
- CARQUEST Auto Parts (2001–2010)
- Parts for Trucks (2011–2020)
- East Coast International (2021–2024)
- Fort Garry Industries (2025–present)
