= J. R. Fitzpatrick =

Canadian racing driver (born 1988)

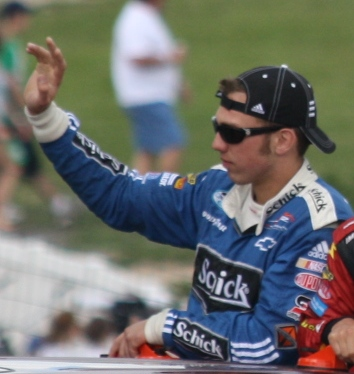
- Fitzpatrick at Road America in 2010
- Born: John Ryan Fitzpatrick; May 9, 1988 (age 38); Cambridge, Ontario, Canada
- Achievements: 2006 CASCAR Super Series Champion; 2016 OSCAAR Outlaw Super Late Model Series Champion; 2018 APC United Late Model Series Champion
- Awards: 2007 NASCAR Canadian Tire Series Rookie of the Year; 2007 NASCAR Canadian Tire Series Most Popular Driver

NASCAR O'Reilly Auto Parts Series career
- 14 races run over 4 years
- Best finish: 33rd (2011)
- First race: 2007 Telcel Motorola 200 (Mexico City)
- Last race: 2011 NAPA Auto Parts 200 (Montreal)
Wins	Top tens	Poles
0	4	0

NASCAR FedEx Freight Truck Series career
- 16 races run over 4 years
- 2012 position: 55th
- Best finish: 26th (2009)
- First race: 2008 Kroger 200 (Martinsville)
- Last race: 2012 Kroger 250 (Martinsville)
Wins	Top tens	Poles
0	1	0

NASCAR Canada Series career
- 115 races run over 11 years
- Car no., team: No. 44 (Glenn Styres Racing with Velocity Race Cars and J.R. Motorsports)
- 2026 position: 51st
- Best finish: 2nd (2010, 2012, 2014)
- First race: 2004 Mopar 250 (Delaware)
- Last race: 2026 WeatherTech 200 (Mosport)
- First win: 2006 Mopar Canada Day 300 (Barrie)
- Last win: 2014 Pinty's Presents the Clarington 200 (Mosport)
Wins	Top tens	Poles
11	74	16
- Statistics up to date as of September 13, 2026.

John Ryan Fitzpatrick (born May 9, 1988) is a Canadian professional stock car racing driver. He competes part-time in the NASCAR Canada Series, driving the No. 44 Chevrolet for Glenn Styres Racing with Velocity Race Cars and J.R. Motorsports. Fitzpatrick was the youngest driver to ever win the now defunct CASCAR Super Series championship, winning in the series' final season of 2006 at the age of 18.

== Early career ==
John Ryan (J. R.) Fitzpatrick was born in Cambridge, Ontario, and got his first taste of racing in karts at the age of six, moving quickly to the Canadian Association for Stock Car Auto Racing (CASCAR) junior ranks and then on to Late Model stock cars by the time he was 13 years old.

Racing in the CASCAR Super Series what is now the NASCAR Canadian Tire Series at the age of 16, Fitzpatrick finished 11th in the point standings and second in the Rookie of the Year standings in 2004. Then at the age of 17, he achieved three top-five and five top-ten finishes, scoring his first win. At the age of 18, he became the youngest driver to become a Canadian Tire Series National Champion with one win, five podium finishes and two pole awards.

== Racing career ==
=== NASCAR Canadian Tire Series ===
Fitzpatrick remained in his fathers No. 84 Chevrolet after CASCAR was acquired by NASCAR; In 2007, Fitzpatrick earned two wins, four top-fives, seven top-tens and three pole awards in the Canadian Tire Series where sponsorship came from Milwaukee Tools. In 2008, he had one victory (Mosport), five top-fives, six top-10s and two pole awards. During 2009, he drove the No. 84 for a part-time deal winning Circuit Gilles Villeneuve leading the most laps. For 2010, he returned to the series full-time with sponsorship from Schick he picked up his first win of the season at Mosport on the road course layout on June 13 and also won the event at Edmonton, he swapped the points lead with D. J. Kennington for over five times during the year going on to finishes second in the points. He ran again in the series in 2011, finishing third in points. He returned to the Canadian Tire Series in 2012 and won the seasons first event at Canadian Tire Motorsport Park he also won the Series's largest even Montreal and finished second in points.

=== Sprint Cup Series ===
In early 2012 it was announced that Fitzpatrick would compete in the Sprint Cup Series' Heluva Good! Sour Cream Dips at The Glen race in August 2012 at Watkins Glen International for Turn One Racing. Fitzpatrick and Turn One Racing would cut ties in early 2012, and the deal never materialized.

=== Nationwide Series ===
Fitzpatrick made his mainstream NASCAR debut in the Busch Series race at the Telcel-Motorola Mexico 200 at the Autodromo Hermanos Rodriguez in Mexico City, Mexico. He came in 33rd place in that race due to an ill handling racecar. He finished 43rd in the NASCAR Busch Series race at Circuit Gilles Villeneuve in Montreal, Quebec on August 4, 2007, right after the NASCAR Canadian Tire Series race at the same track where he won the race: “I was very tired”, stating Fitzpatrick. He drove the No. 4 KHI Chevy at both of the road courses in 2009. He finished 19th at Watkins Glen after getting in a wreck on the last lap. In Montreal he was on pace for a top-ten finish before stalling the car after going off course leading to a poor finish one lap down. It was announced that Fitzpatrick would drive for Dale Earnhardt Jr. in all three road course in his No. 7 team for 2010, he picked up his first Nationwide top-ten finish, coming home seventh at Road America on June 19 and his second top-ten with a seventh in Montreal. Fitzpatrick returned to the Nationwide Series with Baker Curb Racing at Daytona International Speedway sponsored by Schick. However, he finished 42nd in the race. He competed in six further races during the year for Go Canada Racing.

=== Camping World Truck Series ===
On February 13, 2009, Fitzpatrick finished fourth in his No. 7 Mammoet Chevrolet Silverado at Daytona International Speedway during the NextEra Energy Resources 250 Camping World Truck Series Event. Fitzpatrick led 17 laps in the event, his third race in the series and first at a restrictor plate track. After Martinsville his deal with Kevin Buckler at TRG Motorsports fell through and he was a free agent. After driving several races for Kevin Harvick, Inc. and Chase Mattioli in 2009 and 2011, he was scheduled to drive full-time in 2012, driving the No. 60 Chevrolet for Turn One Racing, although he would be released after the first two races.

== Motorsports career results ==
=== NASCAR ===
(key) (Bold – Pole position awarded by qualifying time. Italics – Pole position earned by points standings or practice time. * – Most laps led.)

==== Nationwide Series ====
NASCAR Nationwide Series results
Year	Team	No.	Make	1	2	3	4	5	6	7	8	9	10	11	12	13	14	15	16	17	18	19	20	21	22	23	24	25	26	27	28	29	30	31	32	33	34	35	NNSC	Pts	Ref
2007	D.D.L. Motorsports	0	Chevy	DAY	CAL	MXC; 33	LVS	ATL	BRI	NSH	TEX	PHO	TAL	RCH	DAR	CLT	DOV	NSH	KEN	MLW	NHA	DAY	CHI	GTY	IRP	CGV; 43	GLN	MCH	BRI	CAL	RCH	DOV	KAN	CLT	MEM	TEX	PHO	HOM	127th	98	
2009	Kevin Harvick Incorporated	4	Chevy	DAY	CAL	LVS	BRI	TEX	NSH	PHO	TAL	RCH	DAR	CLT	DOV	NSH	KEN	MLW	NHA	DAY	CHI	GTY	IRP	IOW	GLN; 18	MCH	BRI												98th	141	
2009	Kevin Harvick Incorporated	33	Chevy																									CGV; 27	ATL	RCH	DOV	KAN	CAL	CLT	MEM	TEX	PHO	HOM	98th	141	
2010	JR Motorsports	7	Chevy	DAY	CAL	LVS	BRI	NSH	PHO	TEX	TAL	RCH	DAR	DOV	CLT	NSH	KEN	ROA; 7	NHA	DAY	CHI	GTY	IRP	IOW	GLN; 11	MCH	BRI	CGV; 7	ATL	RCH	DOV	KAN	CAL	CLT	GTY	TEX	PHO	HOM	74th	422	
2011	Baker Curb Racing	27	Ford	DAY; 42	PHO	LVS	BRI	CAL; 20	TEX	TAL																													33rd	145	
2011	Go Canada Racing	67	Ford								NSH; 27	RCH	DAR	DOV; 21	IOW	CLT	CHI	MCH	ROA; 10	DAY	KEN	NHA	NSH	IRP	IOW	GLN; 38	CGV; 5	BRI	ATL	RCH	CHI	DOV	KAN	CLT	TEX	PHO	HOM		33rd	145	

==== Camping World Truck Series ====
NASCAR Camping World Truck Series results
Year	Team	No.	Make	1	2	3	4	5	6	7	8	9	10	11	12	13	14	15	16	17	18	19	20	21	22	23	24	25	NCWTC	Pts	Ref
2008	TRG Motorsports	12	Chevy	DAY	CAL	ATL	MAR	KAN	CLT	MFD	DOV	TEX	MCH	MLW	MEM	KEN	IRP	NSH	BRI	GTW	NHA	LVS	TAL	MAR; 21	ATL	TEX			58th	240	
2008	TRG Motorsports	71	Chevy																								PHO; 30	HOM; 32	58th	240	
2009	TRG Motorsports	7	Chevy	DAY; 4	CAL; 22	ATL; 22	MAR; 21	KAN	CLT																				26th	1137	
2009	Kevin Harvick Incorporated	4	Chevy							DOV; 11	TEX	MCH; 21	MLW	MEM	KEN	IRP	NSH; 23	BRI; 11	CHI	IOW; 18	GTW	NHA	LVS	MAR					26th	1137	
2009	Brad Keselowski Racing	29	Chevy																						TAL; 16	TEX	PHO	HOM	26th	1137	
2011	Chase Mattioli Racing	99	Ford	DAY	PHO	DAR	MAR	NSH	DOV; 34	CLT	KAN	TEX	KEN	IOW	NSH	IRP	POC	MCH	BRI	ATL	CHI	NHA	KEN	LVS	TAL	MAR	TEX	HOM	NA	0^{1}	
2012	Turn One Racing	60	Chevy	DAY; 34	MAR; 12	CAR	KAN	CLT	DOV	TEX	KEN	IOW	CHI	POC	MCH	BRI	ATL	IOW	KEN	LVS	TAL	MAR	TEX	PHO	HOM				55th	42	

==== Canada Series ====
NASCAR Canada Series results
Year	Team	No.	Make	1	2	3	4	5	6	7	8	9	10	11	12	13	14	NCSC	Pts	Ref
2007	Fitzpatrick Motorsports	84	Chevy	HAM; 13	MOS; 2*	BAR; 18	MPS; 1	EDM; 1	**MTL**; **22**	**MOS2**; **6**	**CTR**; **6**	HAM2; 20	BAR2; 9	RIS; 2	KWA; 23			6th	1710	
2008	Fitzpatrick Motorsports	84	Chevy	HAM; 15	MOS; 1		ASE; 5	MPS; 18	EDM; 4	MTL; 22*		**CTR**; **5***	HAM2; 12	BAR2; 6	**RIS**; **2***	KWA; 19		7th	1813	
2008	Fitzpatrick Motorsports	84	Dodge			BAR; 12					MOS2; 13							7th	1813	
2009	Fitzpatrick Motorsports	84	Chevy	ASE	DEL	MOS; 3	ASE	MPS	EDM; 2	SAS	MOS2	CTR	MTL; 1*	BAR	RIS	KWA; 16		20th	640	
2010	Fitzpatrick Motorsports	84	Chevy	DEL; 2	MOS; 1*	ASE; 8	TOR; 8	**EDM**; **1***	MPS; 6	SAS; 2	CTR; 3*	MOS2; 2	MTL; 18	BAR; 5	RIS; 13	KWA; 15		2nd	2030	
2011	Fitzpatrick Motorsports	84	Chevy	**MOS**; **7**	ICAR; 7	DEL; 5*	MOS2; 2*	TOR; 19	MPS; 8	SAS; 9	CTR; 16	MTL; 6	BAR; 9	RIS; 6	KWA; 3			3rd	1774	
2012	Fitzpatrick Motorsports	84	Chevy	MOS; 1*	ICAR; 2	MOS2; 3	DEL; 14	MPS; 4	EDM; 17	**SAS**; **3***	CTR; 3	**MTL**; **1***	BAR; 6*	**RIS**; **2**	**KWA**; **3***			2nd	490	
2013	Fitzpatrick Motorsports	84	Chevy	**MOS**; **27**	DEL; 2	MOS2; 3	ICAR; 4	**MPS**; **19**	**SAS**; **7**	ASE; 3	CTR; 13	RIS; 16	MOS3; 5	BAR; 3	KWA; 25			6th	411	
2014	Fitzpatrick Motorsports	84	Chevy	MOS; 1*	ACD; 8	ICAR; 6	EIR; 4	SAS; 7	ASE; 10	CTR; 5	RIS; 7	MOS2; 1*	**BAR**; **2**	**KWA**; **1**				2nd	450	
2026	Glenn Styres Racing with Velocity Race Cars and J.R. Motorsports	44	Chevy	MSP	ACD	ACD	RIS	AMS	AMS	CMP	EIR	EIR	CTR	MAR	ICAR	MSP; 7	DEL	51st	37	

^{*} Season still in progress
^{1} Ineligible for series points

=== CASCAR ===
==== Castrol Super Series ====
Castrol Super Series results
Year	Team	No.	Make	1	2	3	4	5	6	7	8	9	10	11	12	Rank	Points	Ref
2004	Fitzpatrick Motorsports	84	Chevy	DEL; 11	HAM; 20	PET; 21	MOS; 25	HAM; 9	TOR; 18	PAC; 12	RCS; 8	MOS; 6	PET; 8	DEL; 12	KWA; 11	**11th**	**1645**	
2005	Fitzpatrick Motorsports	84	Chevy	DEL; 5	ASE; 24	MOS; 3	BAR; 14	TOR; 13	RCS; 4	MPS; 8	MOS; 10	PET; 11	DEL; 11	HAM; 13	KWA; 28	**9th**	**1872**	
2006	Fitzpatrick Motorsports	84	Chevy	BAR; 3	**MOS**; **7**	BAR; 1	MPS; 3	**EDM**; **14**	CTR; 2	MOS; 3	MTL; 8	HAM; 8	ASE; 4	KWA; 9		**1st**	**1868**	

=== Parts For Trucks Prostock Tour ===
==== Parts For Trucks Pro Stock Tour ====
Parts For Trucks Pro Stock Tour results
Year	Team	No.	Make	1	2	3	4	5	6	7	8	9	10	11	12	Rank	Points
2014	NOVA Racing	3	Ford	SSW -	PIR -	RIS**^{1}** -	SSW2 -	PIR2 -	660 -	IWK -	OBS -	SSW3 -	PIR3 -	**RIS3**; **1***	SSW4 -	**35th**	**210**

== Gallery ==
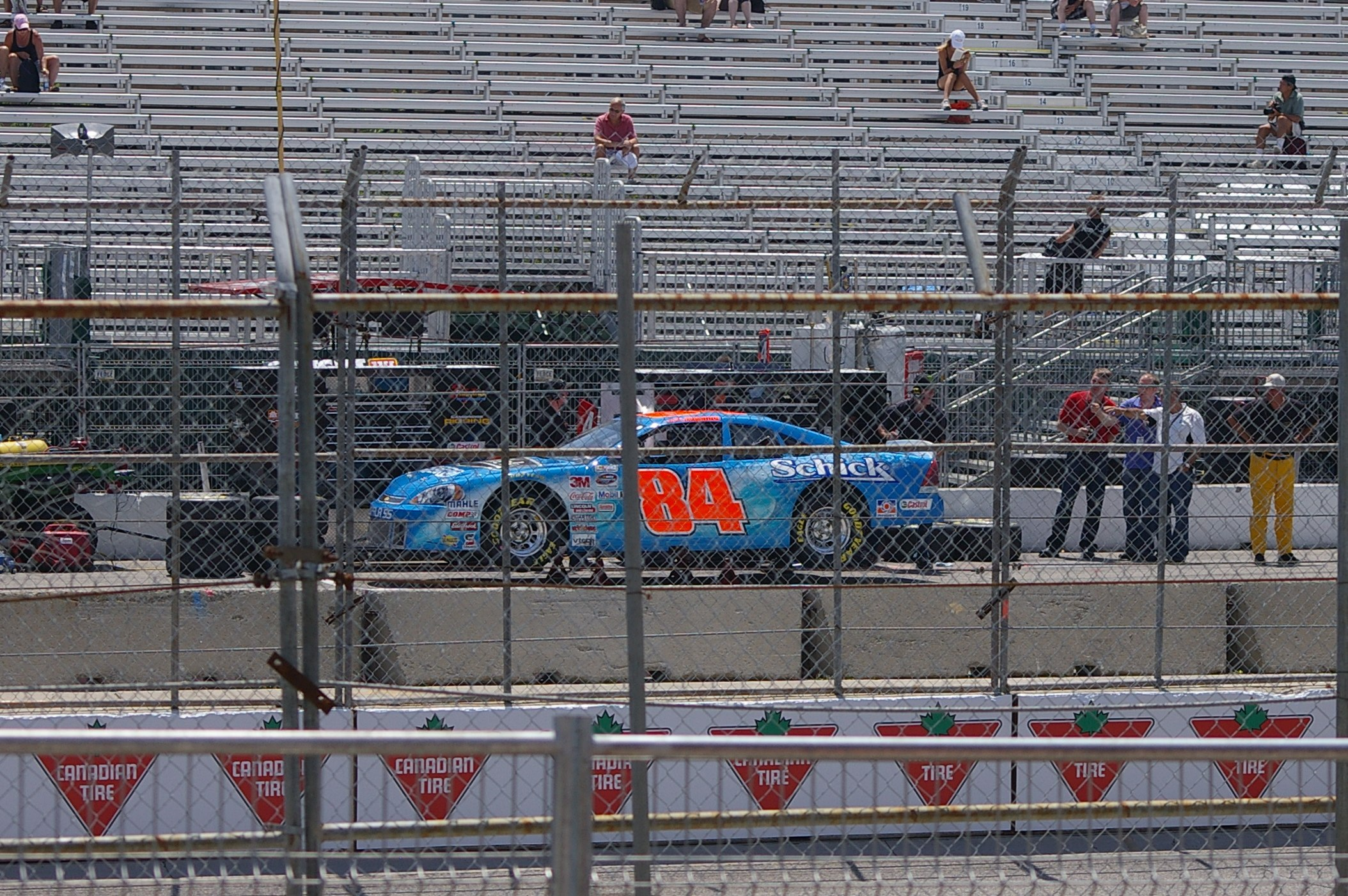
Fitzpatrick's 2010 Canadian Tire Series car

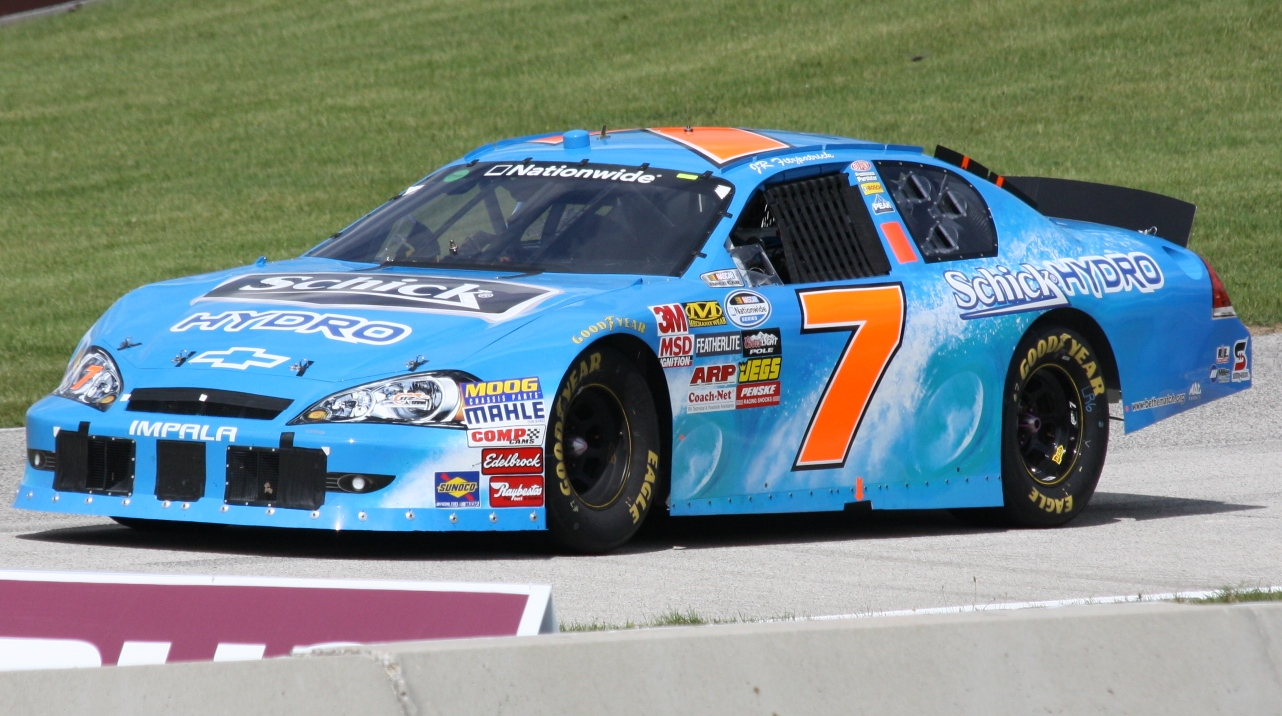
2010 Nationwide car at Road America

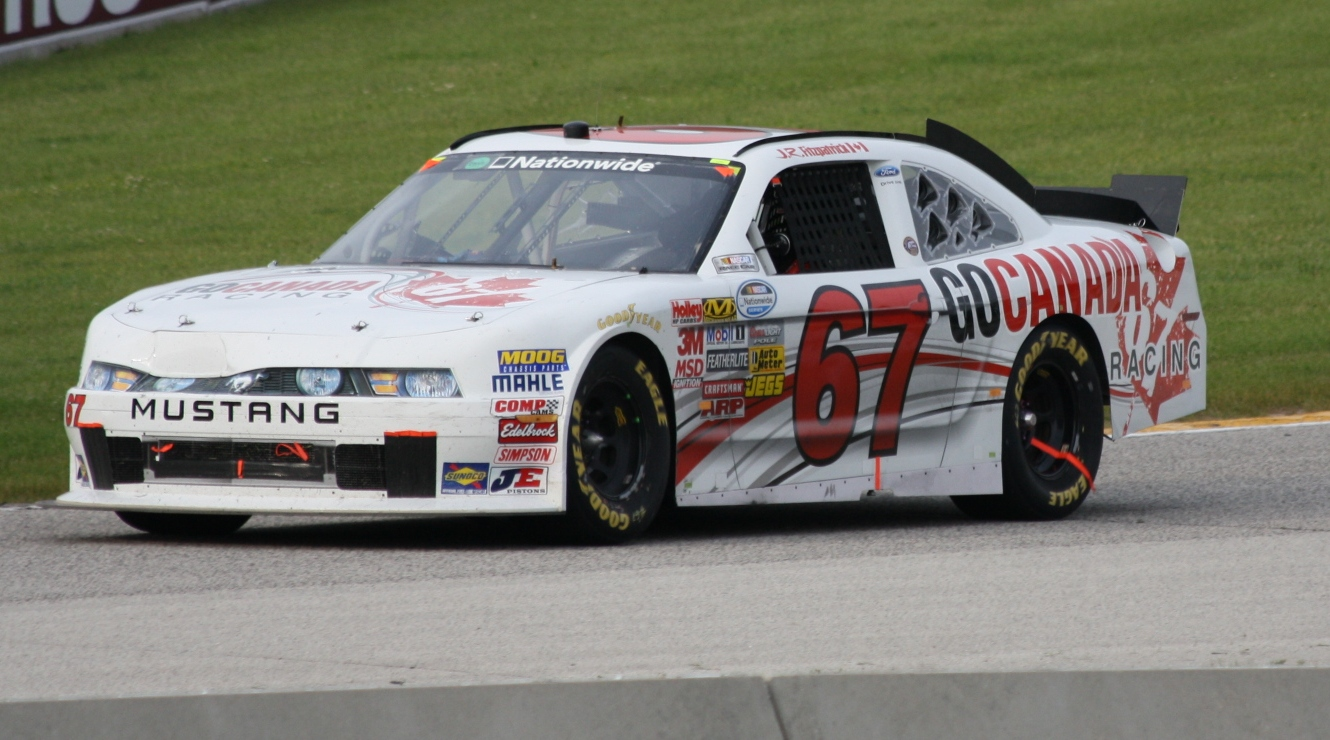
2011 Nationwide car at Road America
