= John Flemming (racing driver) =

Canadian professional racing driver

- Born: March 10, 1967 (age 59); Halifax, Nova Scotia, Canada
- Achievements: 2002, 2003, 2006, 2013, 2014 Maritime Pro Stock Tour Champion; 2012, 2014 IWK 250 Winner; 2000 Atlantic CAT 250 Winner

NASCAR Canada Series career
- 2 races run over 2 years
- 2014 position: 44th
- Best finish: 44th (2014)
- First race: 2011 Komatsu 300 Presented by Wilson Equipment (Riverside)
- Last race: 2014 Wilson Equipment 300 (Riverside)
Wins	Top tens	Poles
0	1	0
- Statistics up to date as of August 31, 2015.

John Flemming (born March 10, 1967, in Halifax, Nova Scotia) is a Canadian professional racing driver. Flemming formally drove the #97 Happy Harry's Affordable Building Dodge for Flemming Motorsports in the Parts For Trucks Pro Stock Tour.

== Racing career ==
=== Early career ===
Flemming entered a demolition derby in 1984, winning it, and catching the racing bug. The following year Flemming entered the street stock division at Scotia Speedworld in Enfield, Nova Scotia, just across the highway from the Halifax International Airport. He would race locally at Scotia Speedworld for the next ten years before deciding to make the jump to the MASCAR series, which was the predecessor to the Maritime Pro Stock Tour, in 1994.

=== Maritime Pro Stock Series ===
Flemming is a five-time champion on the Maritime Pro Stock Tour circuit, winning the title in 2002, 2003, 2006, 2013, and 2014.

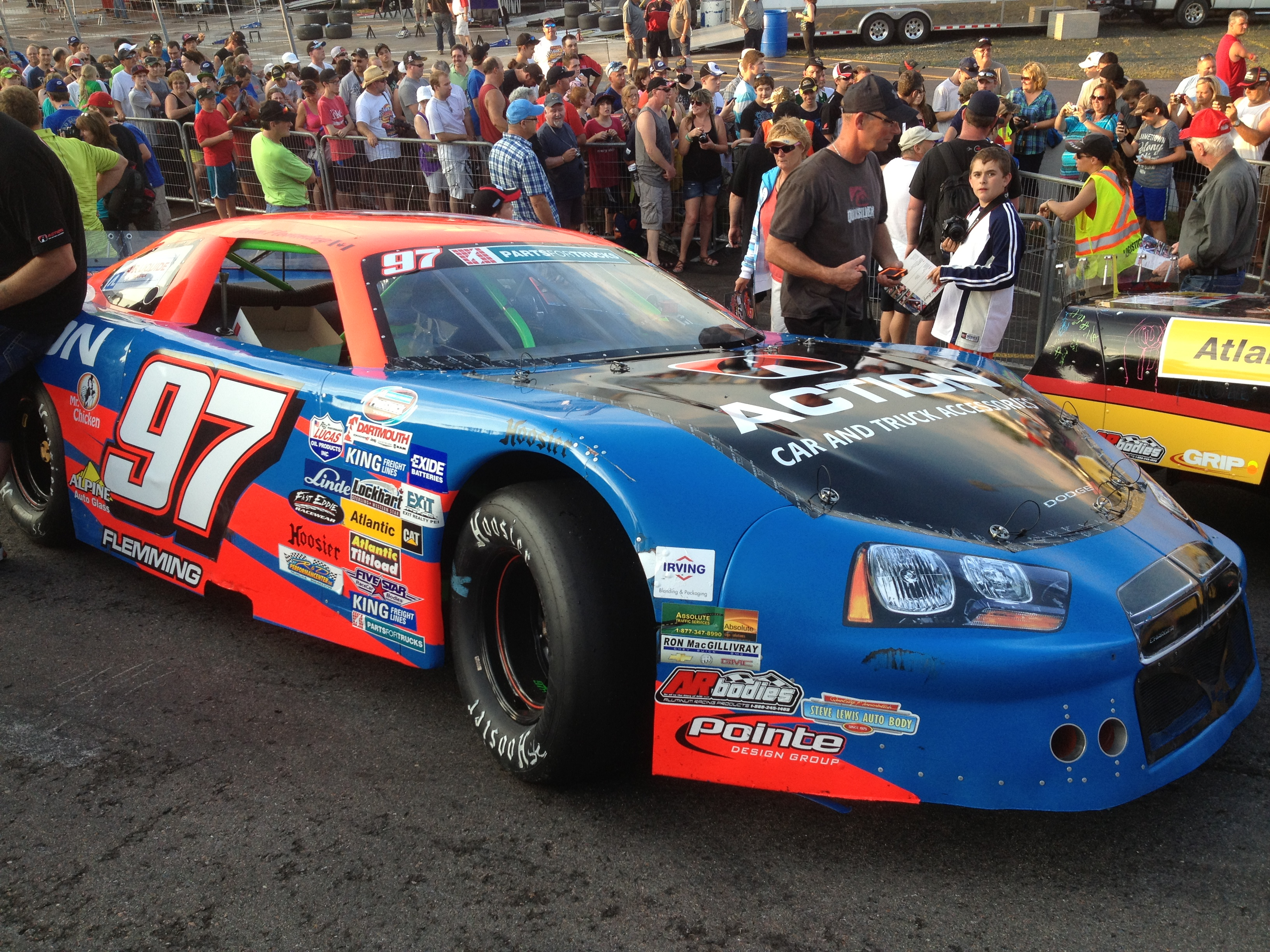
John Flemming's car prior to the 2013 IWK 250

Flemming won his biggest race of his career in 2012 at the annual IWK 250 at Riverside International Speedway, leading 142 laps and finishing ahead of Jonathan Hicken and NASCAR regular Joey Logano. He would win the 250 again in 2014, this time edging out local favourite Donald Chisholm.

=== NASCAR Canadian Tire Series ===
Flemming made his NASCAR Canadian Tire Series debut at the 2011 Komatsu 300 at Riverside International Speedway for NOVA Racing, finishing a respectable 12th.

Flemming made his second career start, again at Riverside, in 2014, this time bring it home in ninth for his first career top-ten.

Flemming was scheduled to return to Riverside in 2015 to make his third career start, this time for his own team. A day before the event, Flemming decided to put D. J. Casey in the car instead. Flemming was impressed by Casey's performance in the Parts For Trucks Pro Stock Tour and upon learning about his dream to race a NASCAR event, decided to give the 20-year-old Casey a shot. Casey made the most of his opportunity, finishing an impressive tenth.

== Personal life ==
John is married to Donna Flemming and the couple has two children, Cody and Taylor. When not racing John works as a longshoreman in Halifax.

== Motorsports career results ==
=== NASCAR ===
(key) (Bold – Pole position awarded by qualifying time. Italics – Pole position earned by points standings or practice time. * – Most laps led.)

==== Canadian Tire Series ====
NASCAR Canadian Tire Series results
Year	Team	No.	Make	1	2	3	4	5	6	7	8	9	10	11	12	Rank	Points
2011	NOVA Racing	98	Chevy	MOS	ICAR	DEL	MOS2	TOR	MPS	SAS	CTR	MTL	BAR	RIS; 12	KWA	52nd	127
2014	22 Racing	24	Dodge	MOS	ACD	ICAR	EIR	SAS	ASE	CTR	RIS; 9	MOS2	BAR	KWA		44th	35

=== Maritime Pro Stock Tour ===
==== IWK 250 results ====
Year	Make	Finish	Team
2007*	Dodge	22	Flemming Motorsports
2008	Dodge	5	Flemming Motorsports
2009	Dodge	27	Flemming Motorsports
2010	Dodge	24	Flemming Motorsports
2011	Dodge	2	Flemming Motorsports
2012	Dodge	1	Flemming Motorsports
2013	Dodge	8	Flemming Motorsports
2014	Dodge	1	Flemming Motorsports
2015	Dodge	19	Flemming Motorsports

^{*} Event run as part of the Pro All Stars Series
