= Donald Chisholm (racing driver) =

Canadian race car driver

- Born: April 14, 1976 (age 50); Antigonish, Nova Scotia, Canada

NASCAR Canada Series career
- 23 races run over 13 years
- 2019 position: 37th
- Best finish: 29th (2013)
- First race: 2007 Atlantic Dodge Dealers 300 (Riverside)
- Last race: 2019 Bumper to Bumper 300 (Riverside)
- First win: 2014 Wilson Equipment 300 (Riverside)
- Last win: 2014 Wilson Equipment 300 (Riverside)
Wins	Top tens	Poles
1	11	3
- Statistics up to date as of September 29, 2019.

Donald Chisholm (born April 14, 1976 in Antigonish, Nova Scotia) is a Canadian professional racing driver. He currently drives the No. 89 Keltic Ford/Nova Construction Ford Fusion for NOVA Racing in the Parts For Trucks Pro Stock Tour and part-time in NASCAR Pinty's Series driving the No. 89 NOVA Racing Ford Fusion.

== Racing career ==
=== Maritime Pro Stock Tour ===
In 2015, Chisholm came into the season with hopes of capturing his first Pro Stock Tour championship. Despite picking up just one win in the Lucas Oil 150 at Riverside International Speedway, Chisholm put together one of the most consistent performances of his career. He would record eight top-five finishes, along with eleven top-tens in twelve starts to capture the title by just nine points over second place Dylan Blenkhorn.

=== NASCAR Canadian Tire Series ===
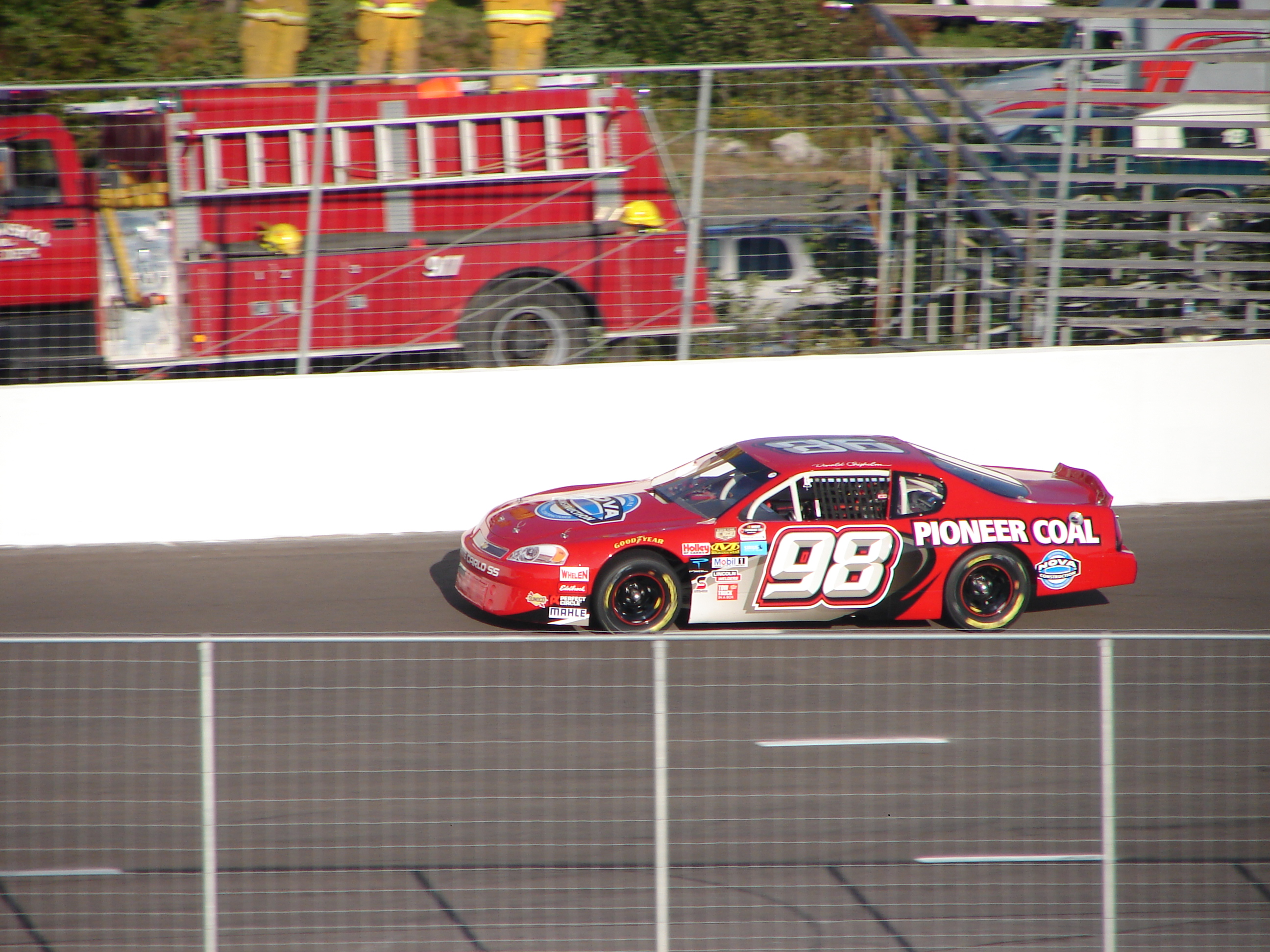
Donald Chisholm on the backstretch at the 2008 Atlantic Dodge Dealers 300

Chisholm made his NASCAR Canadian Tire Series debut at Riverside International Speedway, his hometown track, in 2007. He was forced to retire with steering issues on lap 243, finishing a disappointing 16th. He returned to Riverside the following season, but didn't fare much better, finishing the race in 14th. Chisholm added a second race to his schedule in 2008, finishing all the laps at Kawartha Speedway on his way to a tenth-place finish for his first career top-ten.

Chisholm picked up his first career pole at the 2014 Wilson Equipment 300 at Riverside with a speed of 82.443 mph. He would go on to lead 103 laps in the event to pick up his first career win, beating out series regular Andrew Ranger who faded late after leading 106 laps to finish fourth. The win was an emotional one for the Chisholm family as Donald lost his father, John "Nova" Chisholm, earlier in the year.

== Personal life ==
Donald is the son of entrepreneur and philanthropist John Chisholm. John built Riverside International Speedway in 1969 and repurchased the track in 2005, renovating it into its current state. John Chisholm was inducted into the Canadian Motorsports Hall of Fame in 2015.

== Motorsports career results ==
=== NASCAR ===
(key) (Bold – Pole position awarded by qualifying time. Italics – Pole position earned by points standings or practice time. * – Most laps led.)

==== Pinty's Series ====
NASCAR Pinty's Series results
Year	Team	No.	Make	1	2	3	4	5	6	7	8	9	10	11	12	13	Rank	Points
2007	NOVA Racing	98	Chevy	HAM	MSP	BAR	MPS	EDM	CGV	MSP	CTR	HAM	BAR	RIS; 16	KWA		42nd	115
2008	NOVA Racing	98	Chevy	HAM	MSP	BAR	ASE	MPS	EDM	CGV	MSP	CTR	HAM	BAR	RIS; 14	KWA; 10	34th	255
2009	NOVA Racing	98	Chevy	ASE	DEL	MSP	ASE	MPS	EDM	SAS	MSP	CTR	CGV	BAR	RIS; 5	KWA; 17	31st	267
2010	NOVA Racing	89	Ford	DEL; 17	MSP	ASE	TOR	EDM	MPS	SAS	CTR	MSP	CGV	BAR	RIS; 16	KWA; 11	32nd	362
2011	NOVA Racing	89	Ford	MSP	ICAR	DEL; 19	MSP	TOR	MPS	SAS	CTR	CGV	BAR	RIS; 3	KWA; 22		33rd	368
2012	NOVA Racing	89	Ford	MSP	ICAR	MSP	DEL	MPS	EDM	SAS	CTR	CGV	BAR	RIS; 6	KWA; 9		37th	73
2013	DJK Racing	28	Ford	MSP	DEL	MSP	ICAR	MPS	SAS	ASE	CTR	RIS; 7	MSP	BAR			29th	75
2013	DJK Racing	28	Dodge												KWA; 7		29th	75
2014	DJK Racing	28	Ford	MSP	ACD	ICAR	EIR	SAS	ASE	CTR	**RIS**; **1**	MSP	BAR	KWA; 12			32nd	80
2015	NOVA Racing	89	Ford	MSP	ACD	SSS	ICAR	EIR	SAS	ASE	CTR	RIS; 15	MSP	KWA			45th	29
2016	NOVA Racing	89	Ford	MSP	SSS	ACD	ICAR	TOR	EIR	SAS	CTR	**RIS**; 4	MSP	ASE	KWA		43rd	41
2017	NOVA Racing	89	Ford	MSP	DEL	ACD	ICAR	TOR	SAS	SAS	EIR	CTR	RIS; 13	MSP	ASE	JUK; 8	31st	68
2018	NOVA Racing	89	Ford	MSP	JUK	ACD	TOR	SAS	SAS	EIR	CTR	RIS; 17	MSP	ASE	NHA	JUK	44th	27
2019	NOVA Racing	89	Ford	MSP	JUK	ACD	TOR	SAS	SAS	EIR	CTR	**RIS**; 9	MSP	ASE	NHA	JUK	37th	36

=== Maritime Pro Stock Tour ===
==== Parts For Trucks Pro Stock Tour ====
Parts For Trucks Pro Stock Tour results
Year	Team	Number	1	2	3	4	5	6	7	8	9	10	11	12	Rank	Points
2009	NOVA Racing	89	SSW; 26	RIS; 4	PEI**^{2}** -	660**^{1}** -	SSW2; 26	IWK; 29	OBS -	SSW3; 8	SSW4; 7	RIS3; 3	660-2 -	SSW5; 3	20th	1689
2010	NOVA Racing	89	SSW**^{1}** 6	RIS; 3	OBS; 7	SSW2; 4	IWK; 13	660; 7	OBS2; 4	SSW3; 5	RIS3; 1	660-2; 25	SSW4; 2		3rd	2131
2011	NOVA Racing	89	SSW; 7	PIR; 2	RIS; 1	OBS; 5	SSW2; 8	660; 10	IWK; 16	OBS2; 26	SSW3; 8	RIS3; 14	PIR2; 3	SSW4; 21	8th	2192
2012	NOVA Racing	89	SSW; 8	PIR -	RIS; 20	SSW2; 2	OBS; 1	660; 8	IWK; 21	OBS2; 15	SSW3; 19	RIS3; 9	PIR2; 5	SSW4; 12	7th	2181
2013	NOVA Racing	89	SSW; 16	PIR**^{1}** -	RIS; 1	SSW2; 19	PIR2; 14	660; 25	IWK; 2	OBS -	SSW3; 12	PIR3 -	RIS3; 2	SSW4; 20	17th	1621
2014	NOVA Racing	89	SSW; 7	PIR; 11	RIS**^{1}** 3	SSW2; 8	PIR2; 16	660 -	IWK; 2	OBS -	SSW3; 10	PIR3 -	RIS3; 4	SSW4; 10	14th	1691
2015	NOVA Racing	89	SSW; 4	PIR; 5	RIS; 2	SSW2; 6	PIR2; 7	660; 4	IWK; 9	OBS; 12	SSW3; 3	PIR3; 5	RIS3; 1	SSW4; 5	1st	2348

^{1}Race delayed due to weather and held later in the season than shown.

^{2}Race cancelled and combined with Round 7

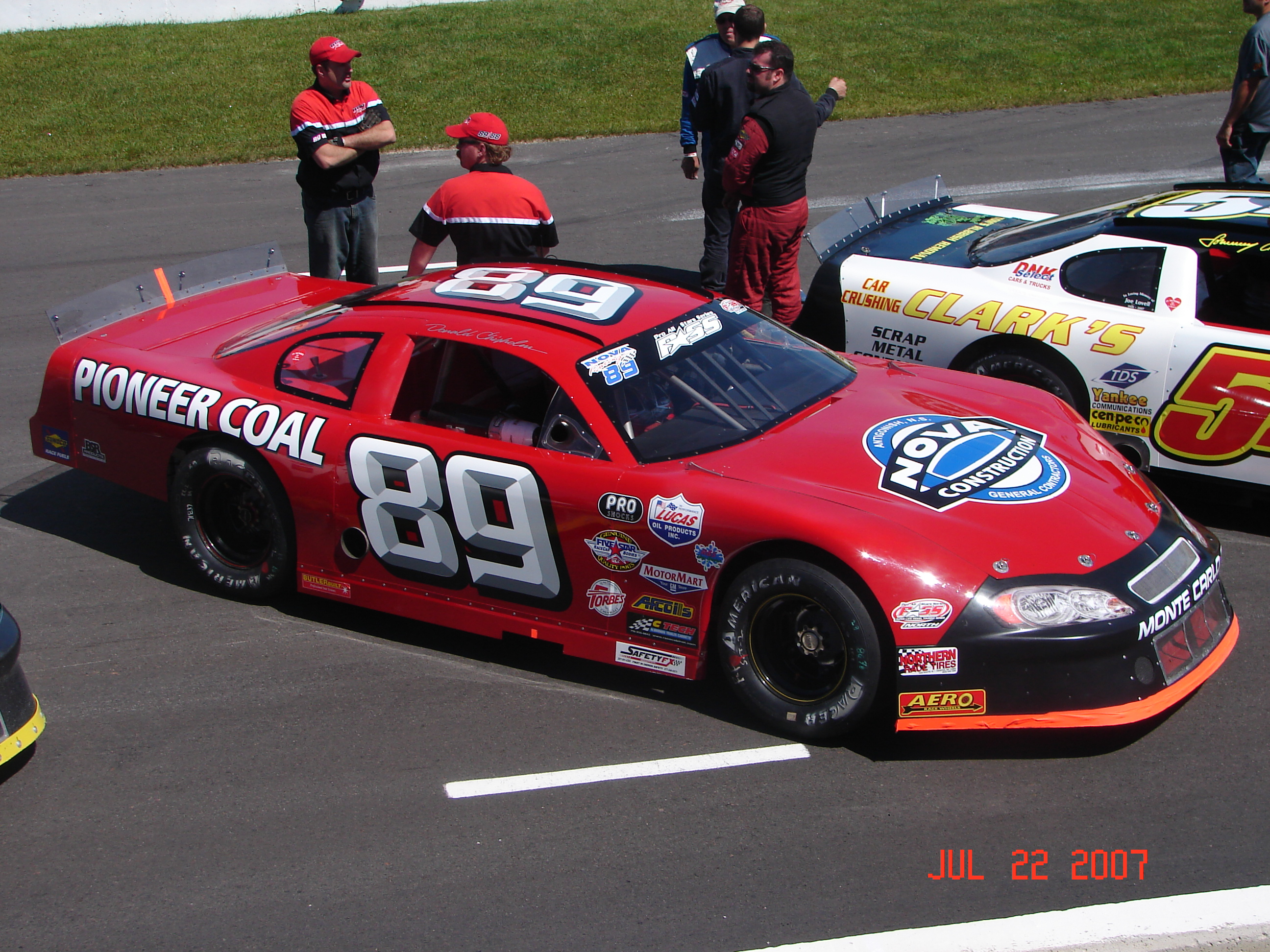
Donald Chisholm's Ford prior to the 2007 IWK 250

==== IWK 250 results ====
Year	Make	Finish	Team
2007*	Chevrolet	27	NOVA Racing
2008	Chevrolet	23	NOVA Racing
2009	Ford	29	NOVA Racing
2010	Ford	13	NOVA Racing
2011	Ford	16	NOVA Racing
2012	Ford	21	NOVA Racing
2013	Ford	2	NOVA Racing
2014	Ford	2	NOVA Racing
2015	Ford	9	NOVA Racing
2016	Ford	1	NOVA Racing
2017	Ford	14	NOVA Racing
2018	Ford	23	NOVA Racing

^{*} Event run as part of the Pro All Stars Series
