= Rollie MacDonald =

Canadian businessman and racing driver (born 1944)

- Born: February 4, 1944 (age 82); Pictou, Nova Scotia, Canada
- Achievements: 1983 MASCAR Championship; 1986 QUASCAR Championship; 2005 Maritime Pro Stock Tour Champion
- Awards: 2005 Canadian Motorsport Hall of Fame; 2009 Maritime Motorsport Hall of Fame; Riverside Wall of Fame

Roland "Rollie" MacDonald (born February 4, 1944) in Pictou, Nova Scotia is a Canadian businessman, racing team owner, and former racing driver. MacDonald is the owner/President of King Freight Lines Limited.

== King Freight Lines ==
MacDonald started the excavating company MacDonald's Excavating in 1975. The transportation side of the business quickly outgrew the excavation side of the business, and the company was rebranded King Freight Lines Limited in 1986 to better reflect the company's new direction.

King Freight Lines now operates mainly as a transcontinental transportation company that services Canada and the United States, however they still do excavation work on the side.

King Freight Lines is a member of the Atlantic Provinces Trucking Association (APTA), as well as the Nova Scotia Trucking Safety Association (NSTSA).

== Racing career ==
=== Early career ===
MacDonald built his first race car in 1965, a ’55 Pontiac, and started his racing career that year at Mountain Raceway, a dirt track near New Glasgow, Nova Scotia. He would then go on to rack up 21 straight victories at Mountain Raceway. In 1977, while trying to pick up his 22nd straight win, MacDonald's car struck the outside in what is considered the worst crash in the history of Maritime racing. MacDonald would spend a month in hospital following the crash.

MacDonald went on to compete in the MASCAR series, winning the series championship in 1983.

In 1986 he teamed up with fellow Maritime racing legend Junior Hanley, taking one of Hanley's cars to Quebec and winning the QUASCAR Championship.

=== NASCAR Busch North Series ===
In 1993, MacDonald purchased a Busch Grand National Oldsmobile from Jimmy Spencer and raced in the Busch North Series forming MacDonald Motorsports. MacDonald made his Busch North Series debut at the 1993 New Hampshire 75 at New Hampshire International Speedway. He started the race in 18th, and finished in 24th, two laps down.

Over the next two seasons MacDonald competed in a total of six races, with five of them coming at New Hampshire. However, his best finish was 15th in his only start at Apple Valley Speedway in the 1994 Fisher Snowplow / Minute Mount 150.

=== King Racing ===
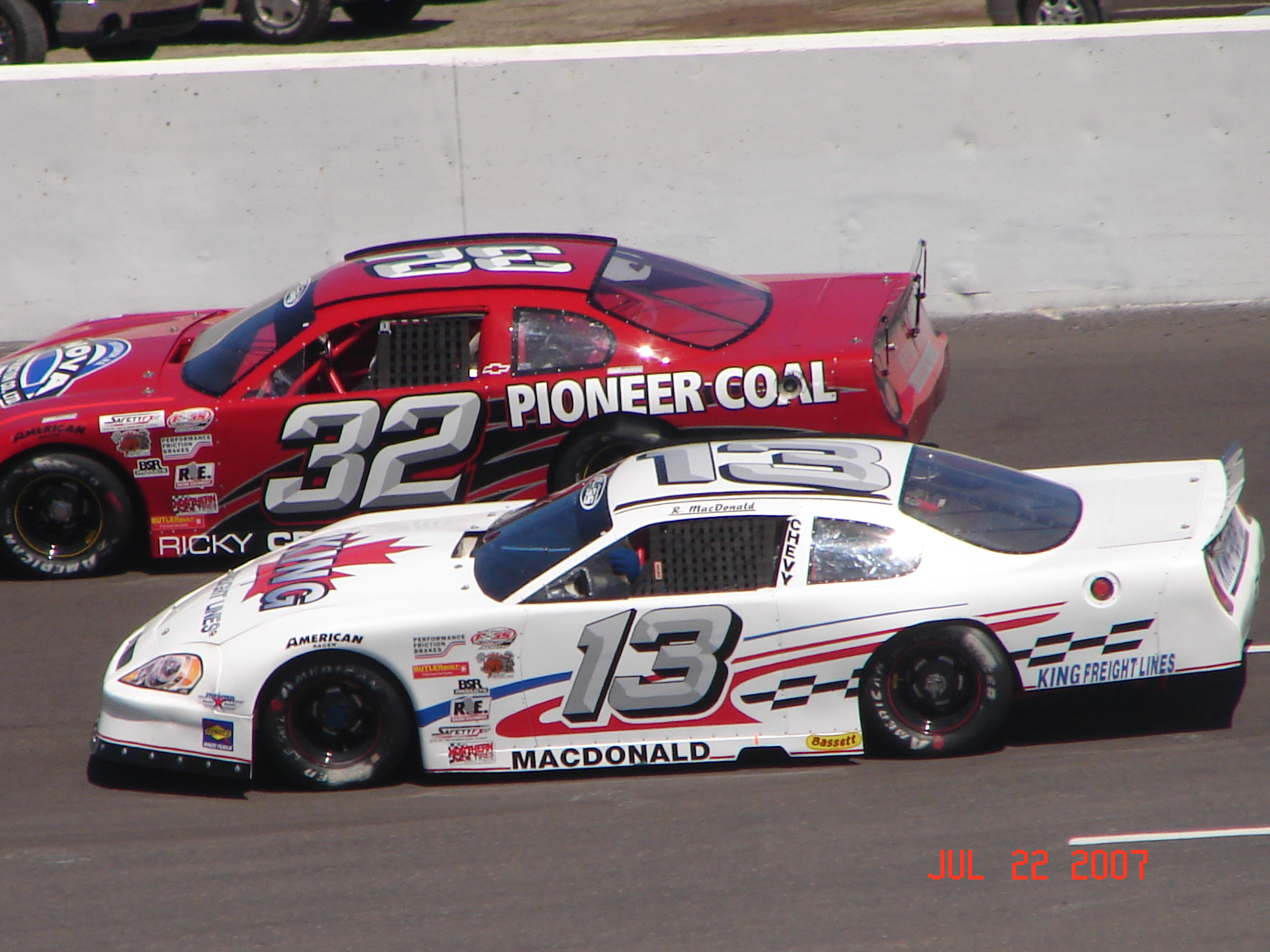
Rollie MacDonald racing side-by-side with Ricky Craven at the 2007 IWK 250 at Riverside International Speedway

MacDonald formed King Racing in 1998 and continued to race on a part-time schedule, while quickly hiring two-time MASCAR Champion Scott Fraser as the team's full-time driver. In 1999 the pair competed at the World Series Of Asphalt Stock Car Racing, a series of 10 races in 10 nights at New Smyrna Speedway in New Smyrna Beach, Florida. Franser would win two of the ten feature races, and go on to finish third in the overall points standings. The team also won two of the six MASCAR races they entered.

In 2000 the team made their ASA National Tour debut at Chicago Motor Speedway. The team's debut was an impressive one, Fraser started on the outside pole on his way to an 8th-place finish. Two starts later the team picked up their first top five finish, finishing fifth at Jennerstown Speedway. In total the 2000 season was a success, with Fraser picking up two top fives and four top tens in six starts.

That was enough to convince the team to run the full schedule in 2001 ASA season. The season started out with Fraser picking up three top five finishes, in the team's first four starts. A series of crashes and mechanical failures would limit the team to just 13 starts.

Following Fraser's death in a snowmobile accident in Wentworth, Nova Scotia on March 20, 2004, MacDonald decided to return behind the wheel full-time.

MacDonald won the 2005 Maritime Pro Stock Tour Championship, 21 years after his first career championship predecessing MASCAR series.

MacDonald retired following the 2012 Maritime Pro Stock Tour.

== Motor racing results ==
=== Maritime Pro Stock Tour ===
==== IWK 250 results ====
Year	Make	Finish	Team
2007*	Chevrolet	23	King Racing
2008	Chevrolet	25	King Racing
2009	Chevrolet	25	King Racing
2011	Chevrolet	23	King Racing

^{*} Event run as part of the Pro All Stars Series
