= 2014 NASCAR Canadian Tire Series =

Seasons
- ← 2013 2015 →

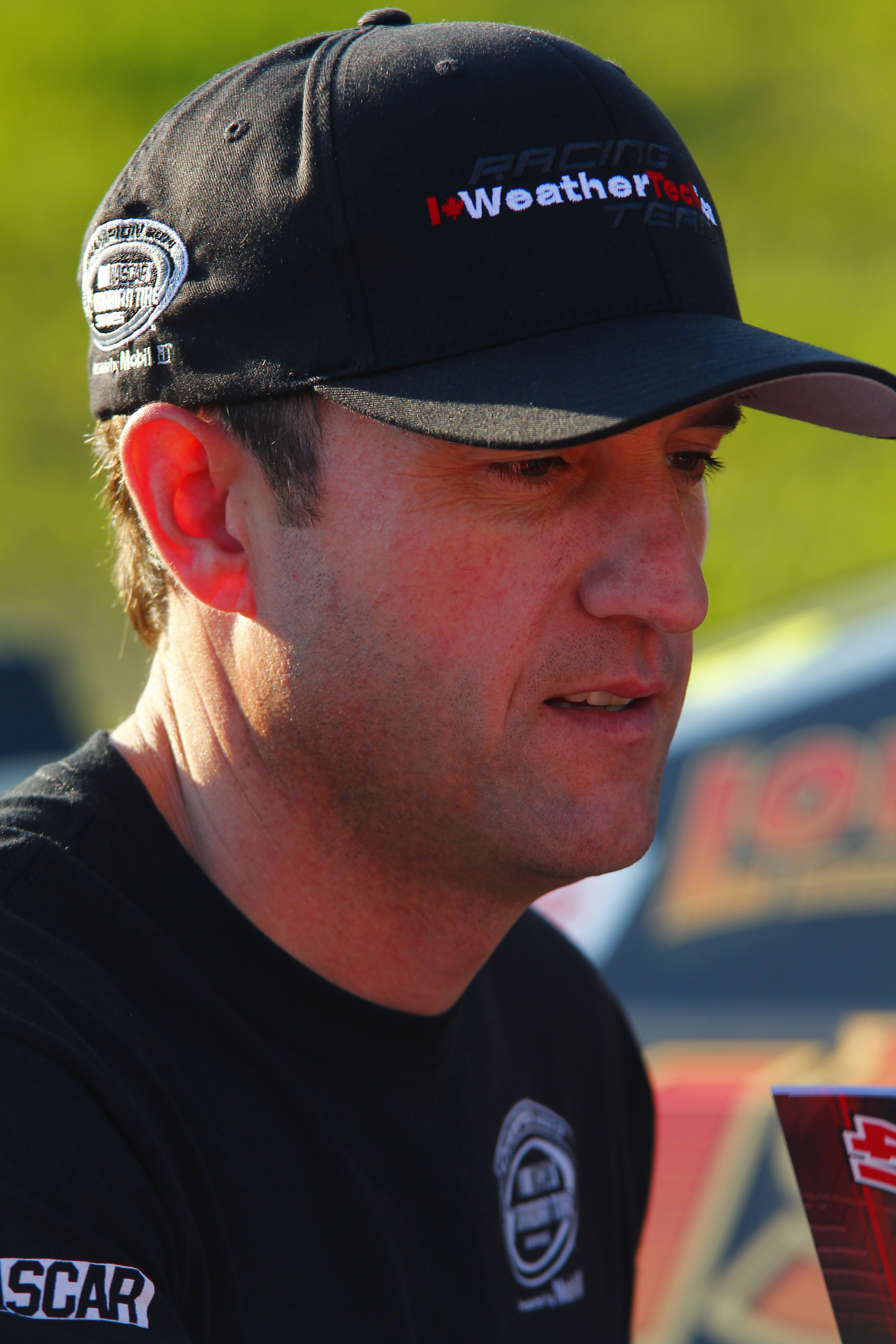
Louis-Philippe Dumoulin won the championship.

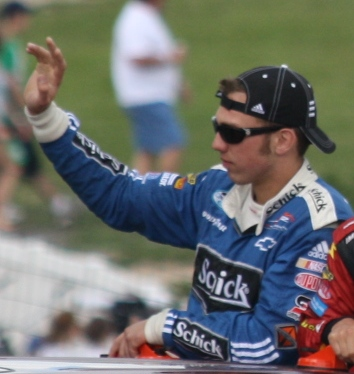
J. R. Fitzpatrick finished second by three points.

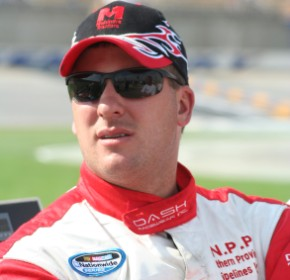
D. J. Kennington finished third by 51 points.

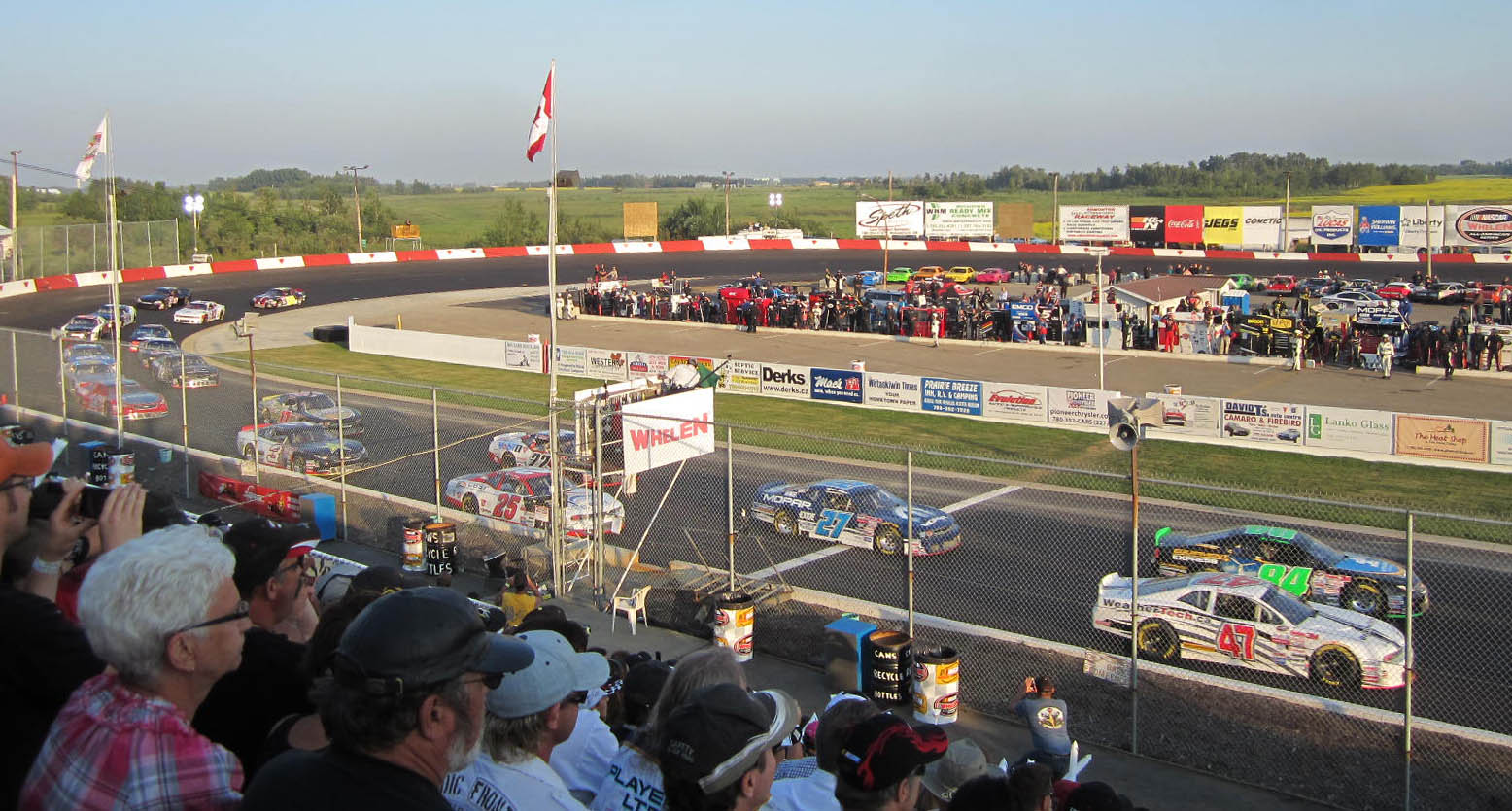
The start of the Alberta Has Energy 300 at Edmonton International Raceway, the fourth round of the championship.

The 2014 NASCAR Canadian Tire Series was the eighth season of the NASCAR Canadian Tire Series, which took place in the summer of 2014. The season consisted of 11 races at 10 different venues, of which 7 were held on ovals. It began with the Pinty's presents the Clarington 200 at Canadian Tire Motorsport Park on May 18 and ended with the Pinty's 250 at Kawartha Speedway on September 20. Scott Steckly entered the season as the defending Drivers' Champion.

Louis-Philippe Dumoulin won his first series championship at Kawartha Speedway, finishing three points ahead of J. R. Fitzpatrick. Dumoulin won two races during the season, at Saskatoon and Trois-Rivières, and finished every race inside the top nine placings; this run included nine top-five finishes. Fitzpatrick won one more race than Dumoulin – winning both Canadian Tire Motorsport Park races, as well as the Kawartha finale – but only recorded three further top-five finishes. Despite not winning a race, D. J. Kennington finished third in the championship, eight points ahead of defending champion Steckly, who won at Saint-Eustache.

Three other drivers won races during the season, including Jason Hathaway and Andrew Ranger, who each won two races; Hathaway won the series' inaugural race at the quarter-mile Autodrome Chaudière as well as winning at Barrie Speedway, while Ranger won back-to-back races at ICAR and Edmonton International Raceway, another new venue to the 2014 schedule. The season's other winner was Donald Chisholm, who only contested two races during the year. Chisholm was the winner at Riverside International Speedway, a track that his father owned until his death in July 2014; it was his maiden series victory.

== Drivers ==
No.	Manufacturer	Car Owner	Race Driver	Crew Chief
00	Chevrolet	Derek White	Derek White 2	TBA
00	Chevrolet	Derek White	Dominic Jacques 1 (R)	TBA
02	Ford	Susan Micks	Kerry Micks 3	Rino Montanari
02	Ford	Susan Micks	Mark Dilley 8	Rino Montanari
03	Dodge	Marc Arseneau	Elie Arseneau 2	TBA
3	Chevrolet	Ed Hakonson	Jason Hathaway	Craig Masters
04	Dodge	Paul Corbeil	Jean-François Dumoulin 3	TBA
5	Dodge 7	Kevin Dowler	Noel Dowler	Dave Jacombs
5	Chevrolet 4	Kevin Dowler	Noel Dowler	Dave Jacombs
7	Dodge	Dave Jacombs	Jacques Villeneuve 1	TBA
9	Ford 4	Susan Micks	Russ Bond 1 (R)	TBA
9	Ford 4	Susan Micks	Vaughn Gittin Jr. 1 (R)	TBA
9	Ford 4	Susan Micks	Kerry Micks 1	TBA
9	Ford 4	Susan Micks	Curtis Fielding 1 (R)	TBA
9	Dodge 2	Susan Micks	Kerry Micks 1	TBA
9	Dodge 2	Susan Micks	Dwayne Baker 1 (R)	TBA
13	Dodge	Rob McConnell	Trevor Monaghan 1	TBA
14	Chevrolet	James Van Domselaar	James Van Domselaar 4	TBA
15	Ford	Bill Mathews	Steve Mathews 3	Rick McColl
16	Chevrolet	Benoit Theetge	Benoit Theetge 1 (R)	TBA
17	Dodge	Doug Kennington	D. J. Kennington	Dave Wight
18	Dodge	Bronte Tagliani	Stefan Rzadzinski 2 (R)	Tyler Case
18	Dodge	Bronte Tagliani	Alex Tagliani 9	Tyler Case
19	Ford	Reginald Arseneault	Brad Graham 1	TBA
22	Dodge	Scott Steckly	Scott Steckly	Randy Steckly
24	Dodge	Scott Steckly	Luc Lesage 4 (R)	TBA
24	Dodge	Scott Steckly	Ray Courtemanche Jr. 2	TBA
24	Dodge	Scott Steckly	Stefan Rzadzinski 2 (R)	TBA
24	Dodge	Scott Steckly	John Flemming 1	TBA
24	Dodge	Scott Steckly	James White 1 (R)	TBA
25	Dodge	Bud Morris	Joey McColm	Ryan Weiss
27	Dodge	D. J. Kennington	Andrew Ranger	Bill Burns
28	Dodge 6	D. J. Kennington	Jason White 4	Lawrence Roy
28	Dodge 6	D. J. Kennington	Jamie Krzysik 1 (R)	Lawrence Roy
28	Dodge 6	D. J. Kennington	Ian Admiraal 1 (R)	Lawrence Roy
28	Ford 2	D. J. Kennington	Donald Chisholm 2	Lawrence Roy
29	Dodge	Ray Courtemanche Jr.	Ray Courtemanche Jr. 4	Mike Knott
33	Chevrolet	Bob DeLorme	Bob DeLorme 1 (R)	TBA
36	Dodge	Ghislain Labbé	Alex Labbé 2	TBA
37	Dodge	Clement Samson	Simon Dion-Viens 4 (R)	TBA
39	Dodge	Jacques Guenette	Alex Guenette 4	Martin Roy
42	Chevrolet	Peter Klutt	Peter Klutt 4	TBA
47	Dodge	Marc-Andre Bergeron	Louis-Philippe Dumoulin	Mario Gosselin
48	Chevrolet	Kevin Kozack	Steve Mathews 2	TBA
51	Dodge	Murray Haukaas	Nick Jewell 2	TBA
56	Dodge	Dan Bray	Matthew Scannell 8 (R)	Howie Scannell Jr.
56	Dodge	Dan Bray	Larry Jackson 2	Howie Scannell Jr.
57	Chevrolet	Dennis LaForce	Shania LaForce 1 (R)	TBA
57	Chevrolet	Dennis LaForce	Dennis LaForce 1 (R)	TBA
59	Chevrolet	Peter Klutt	Ryan Klutt 1 (R)	TBA
59	Chevrolet	Peter Klutt	Gary Klutt 3	TBA
61	Dodge	Peter Klutt	Ryan Klutt 1 (R)	TBA
61	Dodge	Peter Klutt	Gary Klutt 1	TBA
66	Dodge	Fraser Bull	Robin Buck 2	Fraser Bull
67	Chevrolet	David Thorndyke	David Thorndyke 2	TBA
71	Dodge	Patrice Brisebois	Patrice Brisebois 2	TBA
72	Dodge	Dave Jacombs	Erica Thiering 5 (R)	TBA
72	Dodge	Dave Jacombs	Xavier Coupal 2	TBA
72	Dodge	Dave Jacombs	Alex Labbé 2	TBA
76	Dodge	Sherri Lapcevich	Jeff Lapcevich 7	Chris Couvillon
77	Dodge	Katherine Almeida	Jocelyn Fecteau 4 (R)	TBA
83	Dodge	Menno Admiraal	Bob Attrell 1 (R)	TBA
83	Dodge	Menno Admiraal	Ian Admiraal 1 (R)	TBA
84	Chevrolet	John Fitzpatrick	J. R. Fitzpatrick	Don Thomson Jr.
87	Ford	Bud Morris	Steve Mathews 2	Rick McColl
88	Chevrolet	Derek White	Marc-Antoine Camirand3	TBA
88	Chevrolet	Derek White	Derek White 1	TBA
90	Dodge	Normand Roy	Paul Jean 1 (R)	TBA
94	Dodge	Ray Courtemanche Jr.	Dave Coursol 1	Andre Coursol
95	Dodge	Peter Simone	Anthony Simone 7	Jeff Walt
97	Ford 5	Yvon Vannini	Hugo Vannini 5	Yvon Vannini
97	Chevrolet 2	Yvon Vannini	Jason Hankewich 2	Yvon Vannini
98	Dodge	Jim Bray	Larry Jackson 3	TBA
99	Chevrolet	Derek White	Matt Pritiko 3 (R)	TBA
99	Chevrolet	Derek White	Marc-Antoine Camirand 2	TBA

== Schedule ==
No.	Race title	Track	Date
1	Pinty's presents the Clarington 200	Canadian Tire Motorsport Park, Bowmanville	May 18
2	Budweiser 300	Autodrome Chaudière, Vallée-Jonction	June 15 (Note: The Budweiser 300 was postponed a day because of persistent rain.)
3	Jiffy Lube 100 presented by La Petite Bretonne	Circuit ICAR, Mirabel	July 6
4	Alberta Has Energy 300	Edmonton International Raceway, Wetaskiwin	July 11
5	Velocity Prairie Thunder 250	Auto Clearing Motor Speedway, Saskatoon	July 16
6	National 250	Autodrome Saint-Eustache, Saint-Eustache	July 26
7	JuliaWine.com le 50 Tours (Note: The JuliaWine.com le 50 Tours event had been extended due to a green–white–checker finish, but finished under a red flag due to time constraints, after an incident involving Xavier Coupal and Marc-Antoine Camirand, which launched Coupal's car into a series of rolls.)	Circuit Trois-Rivières, Trois-Rivières	August 10
8	Wilson Equipment 300	Riverside International Speedway, James River	August 16
9	Pinty's presents the Clarington 200	Canadian Tire Motorsport Park, Bowmanville	August 31
10	Wahta Springs 300	Barrie Speedway, Oro-Medonte	September 6
11	Pinty's 250	Kawartha Speedway, Cavan Monaghan	September 20

== Results and standings ==
=== Races ===
Race	Name	Pole position	Most laps led	Winning driver	Manufacturer
1	Pinty's presents the Clarington 200	Andrew Ranger	J. R. Fitzpatrick	J. R. Fitzpatrick	Chevrolet
2	Budweiser 300	Steve Mathews	Jason Hathaway	Jason Hathaway	Chevrolet
3	Jiffy Lube 100 presented by La Petite Bretonne	Andrew Ranger	Andrew Ranger	Andrew Ranger	Dodge
4	Alberta Has Energy 300	Alex Tagliani	Alex Tagliani	Andrew Ranger	Dodge
5	Velocity Prairie Thunder 250	Scott Steckly	Scott Steckly	Louis-Philippe Dumoulin	Dodge
6	National 250	Alex Labbé	Scott Steckly	Scott Steckly	Dodge
7	JuliaWine.com le 50 Tours	Marc-Antoine Camirand	Louis-Philippe Dumoulin	Louis-Philippe Dumoulin	Dodge
8	Wilson Equipment 300	Donald Chisholm	Andrew Ranger	Donald Chisholm	Ford
9	Pinty's presents the Clarington 200	Andrew Ranger	J. R. Fitzpatrick	J. R. Fitzpatrick	Chevrolet
10	Wahta Springs 300	J. R. Fitzpatrick	Jason Hathaway	Jason Hathaway	Chevrolet
11	Pinty's 250	J. R. Fitzpatrick	J. R. Fitzpatrick	J. R. Fitzpatrick	Chevrolet

=== Drivers' championship ===
(key) Bold - Pole position awarded by time. Italics - Pole position set by final practice results or rainout. * – Most laps led.

Pos.	Driver	MSP	ACD	ICAR	EIR	VER	STE	CTR	RIV	MSP	BAR	KAW	Points
1	Louis-Philippe Dumoulin	4	5	3	2	1	3	1*	6	4	4	9	453
2	J. R. Fitzpatrick	1*	8	6	4	7	10	5	7	1*	**2**	**1***	450
3	D. J. Kennington	5	7	12	5	8	9	18	3	7	3	5	402
4	Scott Steckly	25	4	7	8	**3***	1*	16	15	5	13	2	394
5	Jason Hathaway	24	1*	9	3	2	11	8	12	30	1*	3	393
6	Andrew Ranger	**21**	12	**1***	1	4	8	2	4*	**29**	15	23	378
7	Noel Dowler	22	9	11	10	9	6	9	8	13	7	16	366
8	Joey McColm	17	16	26	6	6	17	10	11	10	6	14	347
9	Alex Tagliani		14	5	**13***	5	12	25		20	10	21	273
10	Mark Dilley		2	19	19	14	7		5		12	4	271
11	Jeff Lapcevich	2		27			5	6		2	5	6	255
12	Matthew Scannell **(R)**	12		18			15	29	10	28	9	8	223
13	Steve Mathews	23	**3**		12	15				16	17	7	218
14	Anthony Simone	28	15	13			4	31			11	13	194
15	Ray Courtemanche Jr.	10	17	17			14	12		24			170
16	Kerry Micks	6						3	16	14	14		168
17	Alex Guenette		6	2			2	7					161
18	Erica Thiering **(R)**		13		11	10					8	19	159
19	Larry Jackson				7	13				17	16	15	153
20	Alex Labbé			4			**16**	15	2				139
21	Hugo Vannini	7	11	23			13	27					139
22	Marc-Antoine Camirand	19		28				**20**		3		17	135
23	Stefan Rzadzinski **(R)**	13			9	11			14				129
24	James Van Domselaar				17	18				15		11	115
25	Gary Klutt			8				28		6		22	112
26	Luc Lesage **(R)**	8		22				19		21			106
27	Jean-François Dumoulin			14				4		12			102
28	Peter Klutt	9		10				33		31			93
29	Jocelyn Fecteau **(R)**	14		25				30		18			89
30	Jason White	27	10	29						26			84
31	Simon Dion-Viens **(R)**	DNQ^{1}		15				21		27			84
32	Matt Pritiko **(R)**	16						11		22			83
33	Donald Chisholm								**1**			12	79
34	Robin Buck	3								8			77
35	Derek White	20		16						25			71
36	Nick Jewell				14	12							62
37	David Thorndyke	11								19			58
38	Ian Admiraal **(R)**				18	17							53
39	Ryan Klutt **(R)**	26								11			51
40	Patrice Brisebois			21				22					45
41	Xavier Coupal **(R)**			24				23					41
42	Elie Arseneau			20				32					36
43	John Flemming								9				35
44	Brad Graham									9			35
45	James White **(R)**											10	34
46	Dave Coursol							13					31
47	Paul Jean **(R)**								13				31
48	Vaughn Gittin Jr. **(R)**							14					30
49	Bob Attrell **(R)**	15											29
50	Bob DeLorme **(R)**				15								29
51	Jamie Krzysik **(R)**				16								28
52	Dennis LaForce **(R)**					16							28
53	Dominic Jacques **(R)**							17					27
54	Russ Bond **(R)**	18											26
55	Trevor Monaghan											18	26
56	Jason Hankewich **(R)**				Wth	19							25
57	Shania LaForce **(R)**				20								24
58	Dwayne Baker **(R)**											20	24
59	Curtis Fielding **(R)**									23			21
60	Jacques Villeneuve							24					20
61	Benoit Theetge **(R)**							26					18
Pos.	Driver	MSP	ACD	ICAR	EIR	VER	STE	CTR	RIV	MSP	BAR	KAW	Points

Notes

- ^{1} – Simon Dion-Viens received championship points, despite the fact that he did not qualify for the race.

== See also ==
- 2014 NASCAR Sprint Cup Series
- 2014 NASCAR Nationwide Series
- 2014 NASCAR Camping World Truck Series
- 2014 NASCAR K&N Pro Series East
- 2014 NASCAR K&N Pro Series West
- 2014 NASCAR Whelen Modified Tour
- 2014 NASCAR Whelen Southern Modified Tour
- 2014 NASCAR Toyota Series
- 2014 NASCAR Whelen Euro Series
