= Terence Bay, Nova Scotia =

Terence Bay

- Location of Terence Bay, Nova Scotia Terence Bay (Canada)
- Coordinates: 44°28′00″N 63°42′59″W
- Country: Canada
- Province: Nova Scotia
- Municipality: Halifax
- Amalgamated with Halifax: April 1, 1996

Government
  - Type: Halifax Regional Council

Area
  - Total: 3.37 km^{2} (1.30 sq mi)

Population (2021)
  - Total: 678
  - Density: 201.5/km^{2} (522/sq mi)
- Time zone: UTC−04:00 (AST)
  - Summer (DST): UTC−03:00 (ADT)
- Postal code span: B
- Area codes: 782, 902
- Part of a series about Places in Nova Scotia

Terence Bay (Canada 2021 Census population 678) is a rural fishing community on the Chebucto Peninsula in the Halifax Regional Municipality, Nova Scotia. It is located on the shore of the Atlantic Ocean, 10 km off the Prospect Road, off Route 333, 21.2 kilometers from Halifax.

The community has the status of designated place in Canadian census data. Its name may also sometimes be seen as Terrence Bay, although Terence is the correct spelling.

Terence Bay in Nova Scotia

== History and local geography ==
The area, which is located at the tip of the Chebucto Peninsula, was originally settled in the early 1880s or possibly before, probably by Irish fishermen. Early records for the area include the 1827 Census of Halifax and the parish register of Our Lady of Mount Carmel (Roman Catholic), Prospect, whose entries begin in 1823 and include Terence Bay families. By the 1850s, the population of Terence Bay consisted mainly of the descendants of Irish and German immigrants to NS, many of whose descendants still reside there.

The origin of the name "Terence" in reference to the community is uncertain; theories have included that it is a mispronunciation or misspelling of "Terns", or of "Turner", although "Turner" is unknown in the community as a historical surname. What is certain is that the 1865 A. F. Church Map of Halifax County names it "Turns Bay".

The area in which Terence Bay is situated also contains the communities of Lower Prospect at which the SS Atlantic disaster occurred, and Sandy Cove, at which a cemetery and monument to the wreck with boardwalk and a small museum are located.

== Demographics ==
In the 2021 Census of Population conducted by Statistics Canada, Terrence Bay had a population of 678 living in 314 of its 348 total private dwellings, a change of −9.5% from its 2016 population of 749. With a land area of 3.37 km^{2} (1.30 sq mi), it had a population density of 201.2/km^{2} (521.1/sq mi) in 2021.

== Communications ==
- Area code 902; Telephone exchanges - 852, 850
- Forward sortation area - B3T

== Schools ==
- Terence Bay School
- Atlantic Memorial School, Terence Bay site

== Demographics ==
Source: 2016 Canada census

- Total Population: 749
- Total Dwellings: 371
- Total Land Area: 3.37

According to the 2016 release of population estimates, Terence Bay had 749 people over 3.37 km^{2} (1.30 sq mi). The area had a population density of approximately 222/km^{2}, which is approximately 3 times more dense than the municipal average of 73.4/km^{2}.
