= Goffs, Nova Scotia =

Rural community in the Halifax Regional Municipality

Coordinates: 44°52′56″N 63°29′08″W

Goffs in Nova Scotia

Goffs is a Canadian rural community in Nova Scotia's Halifax Regional Municipality.

Located in the north-central part of Halifax County, Goffs is situated on the Old Guysborough Road (Route 212) immediately east of the Halifax Stanfield International Airport.

The community was first settled by people of African descent beginning in 1784, originally as two separate settlements called West Settlement and the Grove. After several years of fundraising, a school was finally built to educate the community in 1932, enrolling seventeen children. Prior to the establishment of this school, the mostly African Nova Scotian community would have had no access to education. Much of the community's land was expropriated in 1960 in order to expand the Halifax Stanfield International Airport. The Guysborough Road United Baptist Church, established in 1872, was relocated to Goffs Road as a result and later closed in the 1990s. Approximately 130 Black Nova Scotians lived in the area in 1970. The church as well as many graves were moved for the third time in 1984. In 1985, a further 2,000 acres were taken from land owners to construct the Aerotech Industrial Park. As of the 2016 Census, 20 Black residents still live in the area.

The community is home to the 9-hole Airlane Golf Club and the Goffs Volunteer Fire Department, part of the Halifax Regional Fire and Emergency Service. It also has approximately 200 residents living within the boundaries of the community. There has been recent development with new homes in the last decade and the closest body of water is Mud Lake.
