= Junior Hanley =

Canadian stock car driver & race car builder (b.1944)

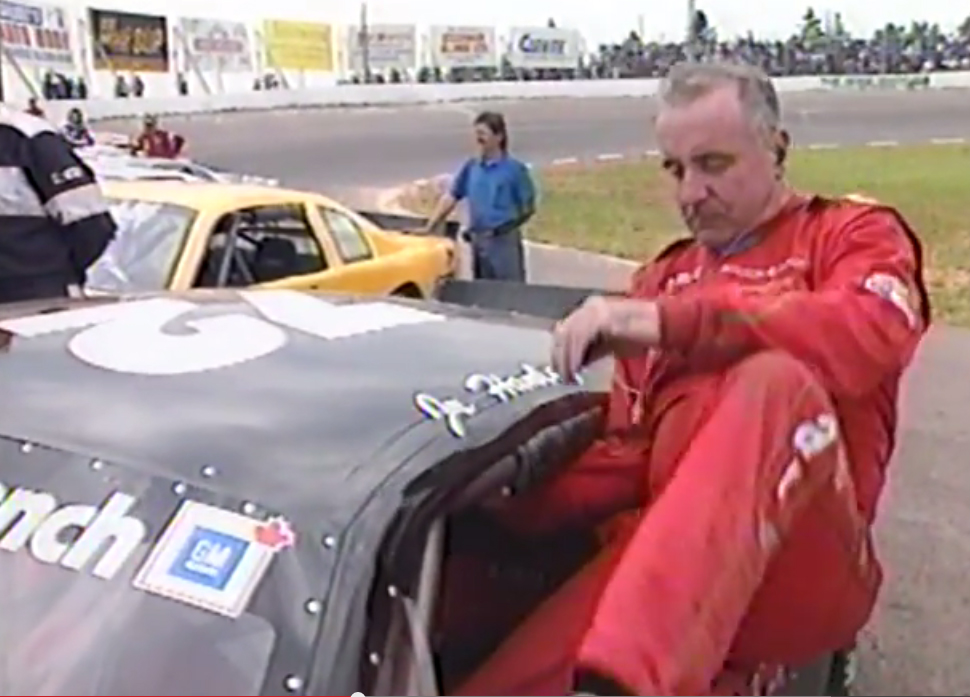
Junior Hanley

Edward "Junior" Hanley (born September 9, 1944) is a Canadian stock car driver and race car builder. Born in Nova Scotia, he migrated to Ontario in the early 1970s at the suggestion of his friend and rival Don Biederman

Hanley built race cars for drivers such as Dick Trickle and Darrell Waltrip.

Hanley was inducted into the Canadian Motorsport Hall of Fame in 2000, and the Maritime Motorsports Hall of Fame in 2011.
