= Scotia Speedworld =

Motorsport track in Canada

Coordinates: 44°52′19″N 63°32′14″W

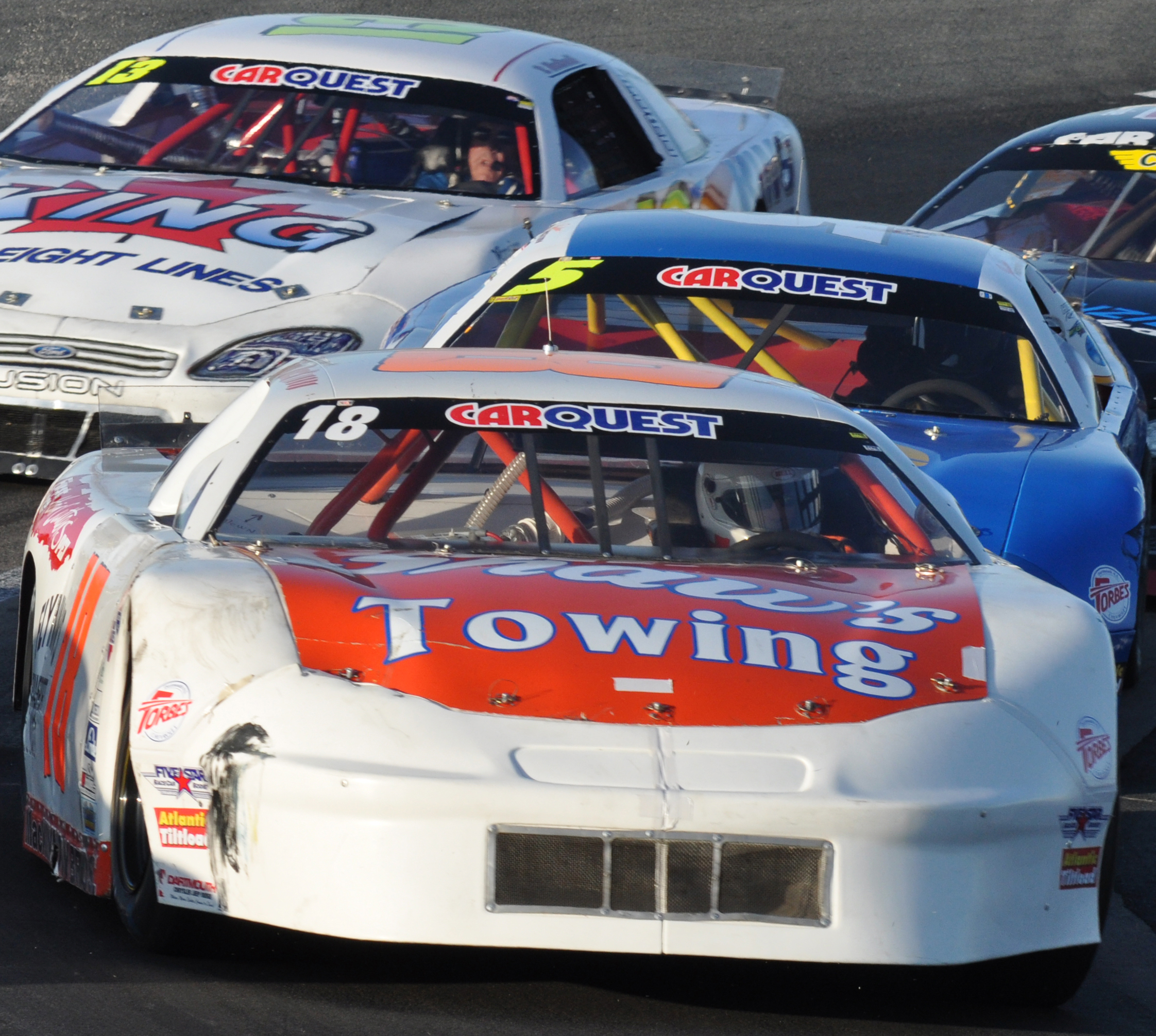
- Location: 150 Sky Blvd; Goffs, Nova Scotia, Canada; B2T 1K3
- Capacity: 6,000
- Opened: 1987
- Website: http://www.scotiaspeedworld.ca/

D-oval
- Surface: Asphalt; Concrete
- Length: 0.300 mi (0.482 km)
- Turns: 4
- Banking: Turns 10° Straights 2°

Scotia Speedworld is a Canadian motorsport race track in the Halifax Regional Municipality.

Situated in Enfield on Highway 102 immediately west of Halifax International Airport, the facility was built in 1987 and seats 6,000 spectators. The track celebrated its 35th year of racing in 2022.

Scotia Speedworld is a 3/10-mile D-oval, asphalt with concrete in the lower groove on corners. Weekly racing includes Sportsman, Legends, Mini Stock and Bandolero classes. Special events include the East Coast International Pro Stock Tour and the World Series of Monster Trucks. The Pro Stock Tour runs several events at the track throughout the year, including the Summer Clash 250 where drivers race for the coveted Scott Fraser Memorial Cup.

The track operates from May to September.
