= Stacey Nesbitt =

Canadian motorcycle racer

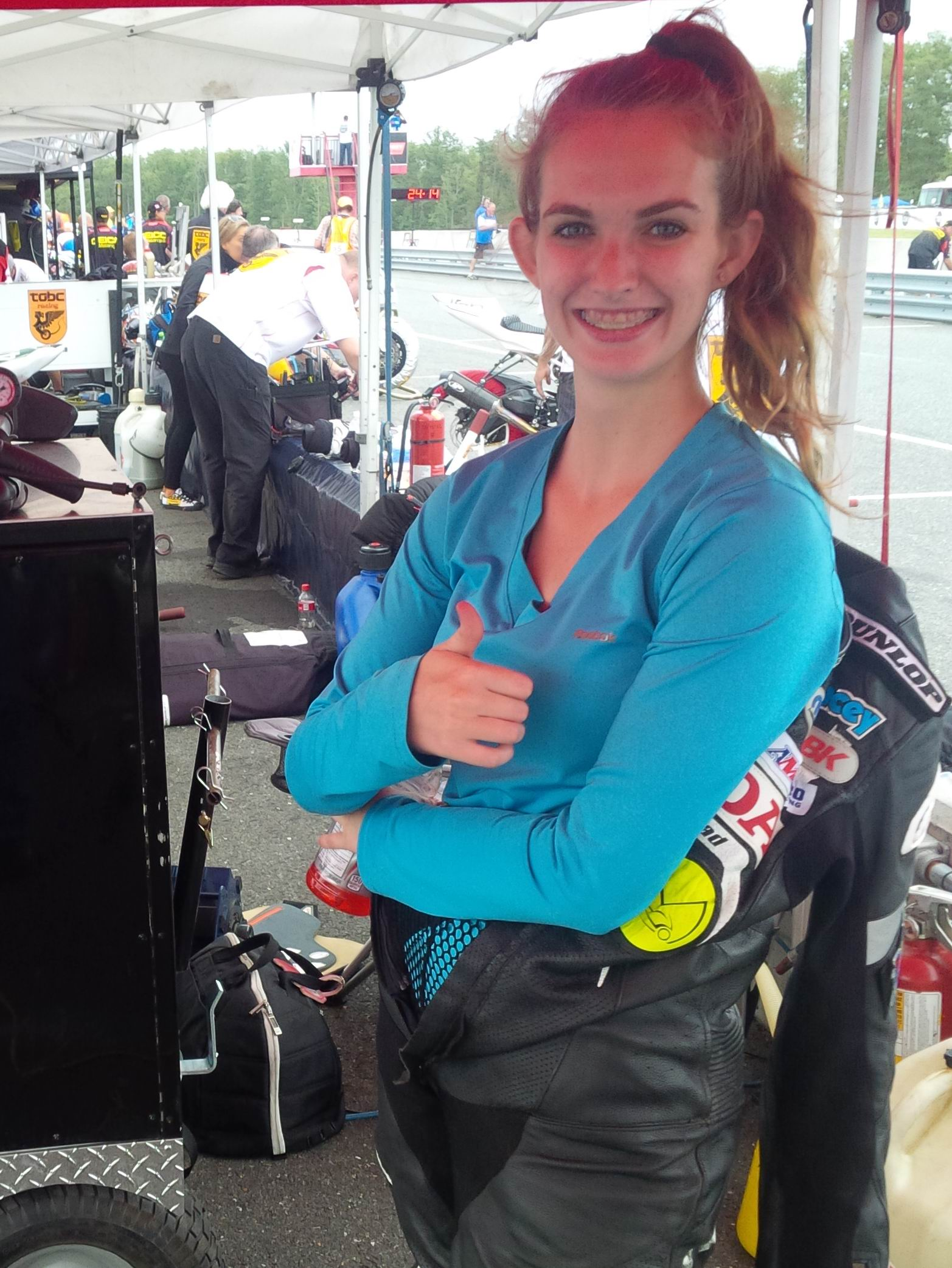
- Nesbitt at NJMP in 2014
- Nationality: Canadian, British, Irish
- Born: March 10, 1997 (age 29); Antrim, Northern Ireland
- Current team: Statoni Racing
- Bike number: 316
- Website: StatoniRacing.com

Stacey Nesbitt (born March 10, 1997, in Antrim, Northern Ireland) is a Canadian motorcycle road racer. She won her first Canadian National Road Racing Championship aged 14 that was open to men and women. Nesbitt is the first woman and Canadian to compete in the Asia Dream Cup. She is currently the Bridgestone Canadian Superbike Championship the Pro-Am Lightweight Pro Champion.

== Career ==
Nesbitt competed in her first race at the end of 2009 having no prior motorcycling experience. In 2011, she won her first national championship, the Canadian Superbike Championship (CSBK) Honda CBR125R National Challenge, winning five of the ten races. She also won the RACE Superseries Honda CBR125R Cup regional championship.

Nesbitt won her second national championship in 2012, the Canadian Superbike Championship (CSBK) inaugural Honda CBR250R National Challenge, winning two races and finishing on the podium in all rounds. She was invited to compete as a wild card entry in the final round of the 2012 Asia Dream Cup, an FIM Asia Road Racing Championship class, held under the floodlights of the Losail International Circuit, Qatar. Nesbitt was selected for the Red Bull Rookies Cup tryouts in 2013 and 2014.

Nesbitt was runner up in the 2014 Canadian Superbike Championship (CSBK) AM Sportbike class and third in AM Superbike. She won the RACE Superseries AM600 and AM Superbike regional championships.

Nesbitt's first Pro race was the final AMA Supersport Championship round at New Jersey Motorsports Park, Millville, New Jersey in the United States in September 2014.

In 2015, Nesbitt was the Canadian Superbike Championship (CSBK) Sunoco/Brooklin Cycle Racing Pro Rookie Of The Year, finishing eighth overall in the Mopar Pro Superbike class. She also finished sixth overall in the Hindle Exhaust Pro Sport Bike class, racing on the Statoni Racing Honda CBR600RR in both categories. Nesbitt is the first female to win Pro Rookie.

In 2023, Nesbitt won the Canadian Superbike Championship (CSBK) EBC brakes PRO-AM Lightweight Pro championship after taking a six year hiatus from racing to attend university and obtaining her bachelor's degree.

== Career statistics ==
=== Canadian Superbike Championship (CSBK) (Canada) ===
Year	Class	Bike	1		2			3			4		5		Pos	Pts	Ref
Year	Class	Bike	R1	R2	R1	R2	R3	R1	R2	R3	R1	R2	R1	R2	Pos	Pts	Ref
2010	CBR125R	Honda CBR125R	ICA; 14	ICA; 15	RCM; 12	RCM; DNS	RCM; 10	MOS; 12	MOS; 16	MOS; 23	AMP; 18	AMP; 18			18th	95	
2011	CBR125R	Honda CBR125R	ICA; 5	ICA; 1	SMP; 12	SMP; 6		ASE; 2	ASE; 2		AMP; 1	AMP; 1	MOS; 1	MOS; 1	1st	421	
2012	CBR250R	Honda CBR250R	SMP; 3	SMP; 2	ASE; 1	ASE; 2		AMP; 2	AMP; 1		MTT; 3	MTT; 2	MOS; 2	MOS; 2	1st	448	
2013	AM Sportbike	Honda CBR600RR	SMP -		ASE; 18			AMP -			CTM -	CTM -	MTT; 9		25th	25	
2013	AM Superbike	Honda CBR600RR	SMP -		ASE; 15			AMP -			CTM -	CTM -	MTT; 13		23rd	25	
2014	AM Sportbike	Honda CBR600RR	SMP; 1		ASE; 4			AMP; 1			CTM; 3	CTM; 2			2nd	219	
2014	AM Superbike	Honda CBR600RR	SMP; 5		ASE; 2			AMP; DNS			CTM; 9	CTM; 8			3rd	120	
2015	PRO Sportbike	Honda CBR600RR	CMP; 9		ASE; 6			CRW; 8	CRW; 8		AMP; 7		CTM; 13	CTM; 11	6th	149	
2015	PRO Superbike	Honda CBR600RR	CMP; 14		ASE; 8			CRW; 12	CRW; 10		AMP; 8		CTM; 18	CTM; 15	8th	106	
2016	PRO Sportbike	Honda CBR600RR	SMP -		ASE -			AMP; 6	AMP; 4		CTM; 11	CTM; 8			9th	99	
2016	PRO Superbike	Honda CBR600RR	SMP -		ASE; 17	ASE -		AMP; 11	AMP; 12		CTM; 20	CTM -			20th	39	
2023	PRO Lightweight	Kawasaki Ninja 400	SMP; 1	SMP; 2	GB; 1	GB; 1		AMP -	AMP -		MOS; 3	MOS; 3	SMP; 1	SMP; 2	1st	182	

=== European Junior Cup (EJC) ===
Year	Class	Bike	(Spain)	(Netherlands)	(United Kingdom)	(San Marino)	(Germany)	(France)	(Spain)		Pos	Pts
Year	Class	Bike	R1	R1	R1	R1	R1	R1	R1	R2	Pos	Pts
2016	European Junior Cup	Honda CBR650F	ESP; 27	NLD; DNF	GBR; 24	SMR; 17	DEU; 22	FRA; 21	ESP; 21	ESP; 28	33rd	-
2016	European Women's Cup	Honda CBR650F	ESP; 2	NLD; DNF	GBR; 3	SMR; 2	DEU; 4	FRA; 2	ESP; 2	ESP; 5	2nd	116

=== Asia Dream Cup Championship (ADC) ===
Year	Class	Bike	(Malaysia)		(Indonesia)		(China)		(Japan)		(China)		(Qatar)		Pos	Pts	Ref
Year	Class	Bike	R1	R2	R1	R2	R1	R2	R1	R2	R1	R2	R1	R2	Pos	Pts	Ref
2012	CBR250R	Honda CBR250R	MYS -	MYS -	IDN -	IDN -	CHN -	CHN -	JPN -	JPN -	CHN -	CHN -	QAT; 13	QAT; 11	17th	8	

=== R.A.C.E. Superseries Championship (Canada) ===
Year	Class	Bike	(Ontario)	(Ontario)	(Ontario)	(Ontario)	(Ontario)	(Ontario)	Pos	Pts
Year	Class	Bike	R1	R1	R1	R1	R1	R1	Pos	Pts
2011	CBR125R Cup	Honda CBR125R	SMP; 3	SMP; 1	SMP; 1	SMP; 1	SMP; 3	SMP; 3	1st	132
2013	Mwt Sptman	Honda RS250R	SMP; 3	SMP; 2	SMP; 1	SMP; 2	SMP -		2nd	104
2013	AM Superbike	Honda RS250R	SMP -	SMP -	SMP; 4	SMP; 4	SMP; 2		5th	46
2014	AM 600	Honda CBR600RR	SMP; 3	SMP; 1	SMP; 2	SMP; 1	SMP; 2		1st	114
2014	AM Superbike	Honda CBR600RR	SMP; 4	SMP; 1	SMP; 1	SMP; 2	SMP; 2		1st	107

=== AMA Pro Road Racing Championship (AMA) (United States) ===
Year	Class	Bike	1		2		3		4		5		Pos	Pts	Ref
Year	Class	Bike	R1	R2	R1	R2	R1	R2	R1	R2	R1	R2	Pos	Pts	Ref
2014	SuperSport	Honda CBR600RR	DIS -	DIS -	RAM -	RAM -	BMP -	BMP -	MOC -	MOC -	NJM; 41	NJM; 36	86th	0	
