= List of auto racing tracks in Canada =

This is a list of auto racing tracks in Canada. The number of turns and track length are based on the standard, full courses for each track. The major series in bold listed are currently hold a race at the track.

Defunct
Not yet completed

== Road courses ==
Track	City	Province	Opened (closing date if defunct)	Major series	Length	Turns	Layout
Area 27	Oliver; 49°09′51.0″N 119°30′55.4″W	British Columbia	2016		4.83 km	16	
Atlantic Motorsport Park	Shubenacadie; 45°08′42″N 63°26′55″W	Nova Scotia	1974	**CSBK**; Atlantics	2.5 km	11	
Autodrome Saint-Eustache	Saint-Eustache; 45°34′24″N 73°57′45″W	Quebec	1965–2019	CSBK	1.78 km	15	
Autodrome St-Félicien	St-Félicien	Quebec	1965		2.00 km	8	
Calabogie Motorsports Park	Greater Madawaska; 45°18′10″N 76°40′20″W	Ontario	2006	CSBK; **CTCC**	5.05 km	20	
Canadian Tire Motorsport Park	Bowmanville; 44°03′00″N 78°40′40″W	Ontario	1960	F1; MotoGP; WSBK; IndyCar; World Sportscar; Can-Am; IMSA GT; ALMS; **IMSA SportsCar**; **World Challenge**; **NASCAR Trucks**; **NASCAR Pinty's**; **CTCC**; **CSBK**; Trans-Am; Atlantics	3.957 km	10	
RAD Torque Raceway	Edmonton; 53.33387°N 113.59850°W	Alberta	2012	CSBK	2.700 km	14	
Circuit Gilles Villeneuve	Montreal; 45°30′2.08″N 73°31′20.86″W	Quebec	1978	**F1**; Champ Car; World Sportscar; NASCAR Nationwide; NASCAR Pinty's; Grand-Am; Trans-Am; CTCC; Atlantics	4.36 km	14	
Gimli Motorsports Park	Gimli; 50°37′35″N 97°3′5″W	Manitoba	1973	Atlantics; CSBK	2.092 km	9	
Circuit ICAR	Mirabel	Quebec	2008	**NASCAR Pinty's**; **CTCC**; CSBK	2.8 km		
Circuit Riverside Speedway Ste-Croix	Sainte-Croix	Quebec	1970	World Challenge	1.77 km	11	
Edenvale Circuit	Stayner; 44°26′20″N 079°57′55″W	Ontario	1951–1959		2.816 km	8	
Edmonton International Speedway	Edmonton; 53.607°N 113.557°W	Alberta	1953–1982	Can-Am; CSBK; Atlantics; Trans-Am	4.067 km	14	
Grand Bend Motorplex	Grand Bend; 43.2911°N 81.7182°W	Ontario	2011	**CSBK**	2.2 km	11	
Green Acres Circuit; No. 31 Air Navigation School	Port Albert; 43°53′5″N 81°41′48″W	Ontario	1958–1959		3.058 km	8	
Harewood Acres	Nanticoke; 42.83293°N 80.04576°W	Ontario	1956–1970		3.700 km	11	
Mission Raceway Park	Mission; 49.125455°N 122.32500°W	British Columbia	1992		2.2 km	9	
Circuit Mont-Tremblant	Mont-Tremblant; 46.18771°N 74.60994°W	Quebec	1964	F1; IndyCar; Champ Car; Can-Am; Trans-Am; Grand-Am; CTCC; CSBK; Atlantics	4.26 km	17	
Oro Station	Oro-Medonte; 44.4872246°N 79.5376072°W	Ontario	2022		4.1 km	16	
Race City Motorsport Park	Calgary; 50.943692°N 113.93166°W	Alberta	1985–2011	CSBK; Atlantics	3.2 km	11	
Rocky Mountain Motorsports	Carstairs; 51.56128°N 114.00885°W	Alberta	2022		3.5 km	16	
Sanair Super Speedway	Saint-Pie; 45.5291°N 72.8837°W	Quebec	1972	Trans-Am	1.33 km	8	
Shannonville Motorsport Park	Shannonville; 44.2254°N 77.1600°W	Ontario	1979	**CSBK** CTCC	4.03 km	14	
St-Eugène/Connor Airport	St-Eugène; 45°29′17″N 74°28′17″W	Ontario	1957–1964		2.6 km	6	
Stratotech Park International Raceway	Sturgeon County; 53.73637°N 113.2340°W	Alberta	2001		1.765 km	9	
Toronto Motorsports Park	Cayuga; 42°54′8″N 79°51′10″W	Ontario	2000		3 km	14	
Vancouver Island Motorsport Circuit	Cowichan Valley; 48.79876°N 123.77341°W	British Columbia	2016		2.3-4.21 km	19	Vancouver Island Motorsport Circuit Aerial View
Westwood Motorsport Park	Coquitlam; 49.3096°N 122.787°W	British Columbia	1959–1990	Atlantics; Trans-Am; CSBK	2.9 km	8	

== Temporary circuits ==
Track	City	Province	Opened (closing date if defunct)	Major series	Length	Turns	Layout
Circuit Trois-Rivières	Trois-Rivières	Quebec	1967	ALMS; Grand-Am; **NASCAR Pinty's**; World RX; **CTCC**; Atlantics; Trans-Am; World Challenge; Can-Am	2.462 km	10	
Edmonton Indy; Edmonton City Centre Airport	Edmonton	Alberta	2005–2012	IndyCar; Champ Car; Trans-Am; NASCAR Pinty's; Atlantics	3.579 km	13	
Grand-Prix de Granby	Granby	Quebec	1984–1985	Atlantics	3.090 km	9	
Moosehead Grand Prix; Citadel Hill	Halifax	Nova Scotia	1990–1993	Atlantics; British Formula 3000	2.253	7	
Moosehead Grand Prix; CFB Shearwater	Halifax	Nova Scotia	1994–1995	IMSA GT; British Formula 3000	2.333 km	9	
Ontario Honda Dealers Indy at Markham; Downtown Markham	Markham	Ontario	2026	**IndyCar**; **NASCAR Canada Series**	3.52 km	12	
Race Hamilton	Hamilton	Ontario	1978–1978	Atlantics	2.092 km	10	
National Motor Races; Ottawa/Rockcliffe Airport	Ottawa	Ontario	1970–1970, 2017–2017 (Rallycross)	Red Bull Global Rallycross	3.300 km 1.226 km	11 7	
Grand-Prix de Québec; ExpoCité	Québec City	Québec	1977–1979	Atlantics	2.030 km	12	
Grand Prix of Toronto; Exhibition Place	Toronto	Ontario	1986-2025	IndyCar; World Challenge; Champ Car; Atlantics; Trans-Am; NASCAR Pinty's	2.824 km	11	
Molson Indy Vancouver; Concord Pacific Place	Vancouver	British Columbia	1990–2004	Champ Car; Atlantics; Trans-Am; World Challenge	2.865 km	15	

== Paved ovals ==
Track	City	Province	Opened (closing date if defunct)	Major series	Length	Banking
Autodrome Chaudière	Vallée-Jonction; 46°2′2″N 70°5′6″W	Quebec	1992	**NASCAR Pinty's**; ACT; PASS	0.250 miles (0.402 km)	
Autodrome Montmagny	Montmagny	Quebec	1994	CASCAR; ACT; PASS	0.375 miles (0.604 km)	
Autodrome Saguenay Speedway	Chicoutimi	Quebec	1966–2006	CASCAR; ACT	0.333 miles (0.536 km)	
Autodrome St-Eustache	Saint-Eustache; 45°34′24″N 73°57′45″W	Quebec	1965–2019	NASCAR Pinty's; CASCAR; ACT	0.400 miles (0.644 km)	
Barrie Speedway	Barrie; 44°28′38″N 79°30′54″W	Ontario	1965–2014	NASCAR Pinty's; CASCAR	0.333 miles (0.536 km)	Progressive
Bud's Speedway	Sydney, Nova Scotia	Nova Scotia	1976	Street Stock, Mini Stock, V6 Thunder, Hobby Stock	0.250 miles (0.402 km)	
Capital City Speedway	Ottawa; 45.242°N 75.989°W	Ontario	1961–2014	CASCAR; ACT	0.375 miles (0.604 km)	
Centre for Speed	Shediac	New Brunswick		Late Model "Pro Stock", Sportsman, Street Stock, Mini Stock, Four Fun, Modified	0.375 miles (0.604 km)	
Checker Flag Speedway	Windsor; 42°16′41.7″N 82°52′50.2″W	Ontario	1961–1992	CASCAR	0.375 miles (0.604 km)	
Circuit Riverside Speedway Ste-Croix	Sainte-Croix; 46°37′55″N 71°47′17″W	Quebec	1971	CASCAR; ACT	0.625 miles (1.006 km)	
Danny's Speedbowl	Beresford, New Brunswick; 47°40′33.3″N 65°40′4.7″W	New Brunswick	1966-1984		0.25 miles (0.40 km)	
Delaware Speedway	Delaware; 42°55′49″N 81°25′4″W	Ontario	1952	**NASCAR Pinty's**; NASCAR Modified; CASCAR; ARCA; **APC Series**	0.500 miles (0.805 km)	Turns 5°-7°
Eastbound International Speedway	Avondale; 47.37183°N 53.23816°W	Newfoundland and Labrador		**NASCAR Pinty's**	0.375 miles (0.604 km)	18°
Edmonton International Raceway	Wetaskiwin; 52°59′16″N 113°27′8″W	Alberta		NASCAR Pinty's	0.250 miles (0.402 km)	
Exhibition Stadium	Toronto; 43°37′55″N 79°25′4″W	Ontario	1952–1966, 1990, 1997	NASCAR Cup Series; CASCAR; ACT	0.333 miles (0.536 km)	
Flamboro Speedway	Hamilton; 43.328234°N 80.023583°W	Ontario	1961	NASCAR Pinty's; CASCAR; **APC Series**	0.375 miles (0.604 km)	
Full Throttle Motor Speedway	Varney; 44.12520°N 80.80168°W	Ontario	1970	OSCAAR; Lucas Oil Sportsman Cup; All Pro Modified, Late Model, Super Street, Street Stock, Stock 4, Trains & Mini's	0.250 miles (0.402 km)	Turns 30°
Grand Bend Speedway	Grand Bend; 43.2911°N 81.7182°W	Ontario			0.250 miles (0.402 km)	12°
Hythe Motor Speedway	Hythe	Alberta		IMCA Modifieds; IMCA Stocks; Legends, Mini Stocks, Mini Sprints, Super Trucks	0.375 miles (0.604 km)	high-banked Oval
ICAR Speedway	Mirabel; 45°40′51″N 74°01′30″W	Quebec	2020	NASCAR Sportsman, Legends, Sport Compact, Mini Stock, Enduro	0.400 miles (0.644 km)	
Jukasa Motor Speedway	Cayuga; 42°56′8″N 79°58′0″W	Ontario	1966–2010, 2017-2021	NASCAR Pinty's; NASCAR North; CASCAR; ARCA; ASA; APC Series	0.625 miles (1.006 km)	Turns 12° Straightaways 5°
Kawartha Speedway	Fraserville; 44°12′32″N 78°23′30″W	Ontario	1999	NASCAR Pinty's; CASCAR	0.375 miles (0.604 km)	
Kings Park Speedway	Regina	Saskatchewan			0.333 miles (0.536 km)	
Laird International Raceway	Laird; 46°25′32.8″N 84°03′34.8″W	Ontario			0.333 miles (0.536 km)	
Lake Doucette Motor Speedway	Lake Doucette	Nova Scotia	2002	Sportsman, 4 Cylinder, V8 Stock	0.500 miles (0.805 km)	
Langley Speedway	Langley	British Columbia	1963–1984	NASCAR Winston West	0.250 miles (0.402 km)	
Mosport Speedway	Bowmanville; 44°3′7″N 78°41′4″W	Ontario	1989–2013	NASCAR Pinty's; CASCAR; ACT; USAC Sprint Car	0.500 miles (0.805 km)	Turns 6°
Motoplex Speedway	Vernon; 50°22′11″N 119°18′19″W	British Columbia	2000	NASCAR Pinty's; CASCAR	0.500 miles (0.805 km)	Turns 1&2: 11° Turns 3&4: 14°
North Bay (Sunnydale) Speedway	North Bay; 46.304940°N 79.398729°W	Ontario	1976–2003		0.250 miles (0.402 km)	
Oyster Bed Speedway	Oyster Bed Bridge	Prince Edward Island	1985	Maritime Pro Stock Tour; Super Late Model Series, Street Stock, Four Fun, Honda Outlaw, Bomber, Legends, Bandoleros	0.250 miles (0.402 km)	High-banked oval
Peterborough Speedway	Peterborough; 44.28174°N 78.42649°W	Ontario	1967	CASCAR; **APC Series**	0.333 miles (0.536 km)	
Petty International Raceway	River Glade	New Brunswick	1983	Maritime Pro Stock Tour; Super Late Model Series, Outlaw Late Model, Sportsman, Street Stock, Mini Stock, Beginners on Wheels, Bandoleros	0.333 miles (0.536 km)	
Pinecrest Speedway	Concord; 43.79149°N 79.51232°W	Ontario	1948–1976		0.250 miles (0.402 km)	
Race City Motorsport Park	Calgary	Alberta	1985–2011	CASCAR; ASA	0.500 miles (0.805 km)	11°–15°
Riverside International Speedway	Antigonish; 45°33′49″N 62°7′59″W	Nova Scotia	1969	NASCAR Pinty's; **Maritime Pro Stock Tour**; PASS	0.333 miles (0.536 km)	Turns 14° Straightaways 5°
Sanair Super Speedway	Saint-Pie; 45.5291°N 72.8837°W	Quebec	1983	Champ Car; CASCAR; ACT	0.826 miles (1.329 km)	
Saratoga Speedway	Comox Valley "N+125°08'15.8"W/@49.85352,-125.140313,17z/data=!3m1!4b1!4m4!3m3!8m2!3d49.85352!4d-125.1377327?entry=ttu 49.8535200, -125.1377327	British Columbia	1969-2019, 2021-	WESCAR Northwest Sprint Tour	0.375 miles (0.604 km)	2 banked corners, backstretch dogleg, 2 flat corners
Sauble Speedway	Sauble Beach; 44.62744°N 81.21400°W	Ontario		CASCAR; **APC Series**	0.250 miles (0.402 km)	
Scotia Speedworld	Enfield	Nova Scotia	1988	**Maritime Pro Stock Tour**; PASS	0.333 miles (0.536 km)	Turns 10° Straightaways 2°
Speedway Miramichi	Miramichi	New Brunswick	1968		0.333 miles (0.536 km)	Turns 1&2 10° Turns 3&4 8°
Speedway 660	Geary	New Brunswick	1994	Maritime Pro Stock Tour; CASCAR; Super Late Model Series	0.333 miles (0.536 km)	
Sunset Speedway	Innisfil; 44.28028°N 79.61067°W	Ontario	1968	**NASCAR Pinty's**; **APC Series**	0.333 miles (0.536 km)	
Western Speedway	Victoria	British Columbia	1954-2022		0.400 miles (0.644 km)	
Sutherland Automotive Speedway	Saskatoon; 52°13′5″N 106°39′40″W	Saskatchewan	2006	NASCAR Pinty's; CASCAR	0.333 miles (0.536 km)	Progressive; Turns 7°, 9.5° and 11° Straightaways 5°

== Drag strips ==
Name	Location	Province	Opened (closing date if defunct)	Major Series	Length
Alvan Accélération Dragway	Saint-Tite	Quebec	1971		.25 miles (0.40 km)
Autodrome St. Eustache	Saint-Eustache; 45°34′24″N 73°57′45″W	Quebec	1965–2019		.125 miles (0.201 km)
Autodrome St-Félicien	St-Félicien	Quebec	1992		.125 miles (0.201 km)
Cape Breton Dragway	Sydney	Nova Scotia			.125 miles (0.201 km)
Castrol Raceway	Edmonton; 53.33387°N 113.59850°W	Alberta		NHRA	.25 miles (0.40 km)
Central Alberta Raceways	Rimbey	Alberta			.25 miles (0.40 km)
Chetwynd Airport	Chetwynd	British Columbia			.25 miles (0.40 km)
Circuit Au Bosquet	Destor	Quebec			.125 miles (0.201 km)
Clarenville Dragway	Clarenville	Newfoundland and Labrador			.25 miles (0.40 km)
Earlton-Timiskaming Drag' N' Fly	Earlton	Ontario			
Elliot Lake Airport Dragway	Elliot Lake	Ontario			.125 miles (0.201 km)
Estevan Airport Drags	Estevan	Saskatchewan			
Gimli Motorsports Park	Gimli; 50°37′35″N 97°3′5″W	Manitoba	1978	IHRA	.25 miles (0.40 km)
Grand Bend Motorplex	Grand Bend; 43.2911°N 81.7182°W	Ontario		IHRA	.25 miles (0.40 km)
Grande Prairie Drag Wars	Grande Prairie	Alberta			.25 miles (0.40 km)
Greenfield Dragway	Liverpool	Nova Scotia			.125 miles (0.201 km)
King Of The Hill Dragway	North Bay	Ontario			
Luskville Dragway	Luskville	Quebec	1969	NHRA	.25 miles (0.40 km)
Medicine Hat Dragstrip	Medicine Hat	Alberta		NHRA	.25 miles (0.40 km)
Miramichi Dragway Park	Miramichi	New Brunswick		NHRA	.25 miles (0.40 km)
Mission Raceway Park	Mission; 49.12546°N 122.32500°W	British Columbia	1992	NHRA	.25 miles (0.40 km)
Napierville Dragway	Napierville	Quebec	1962	NHRA	.25 miles (0.40 km)
North Central Motorsports Park	Prince George	British Columbia		NHRA	.25 miles (0.40 km)
Northern Lights Raceway	Fort St. John	British Columbia			.25 miles (0.40 km)
Northern Thunder Dragway	Kirkland Lake	Ontario			.125 miles (0.201 km)
Nl'akapxm Eagle Motorplex	Ashcroft	British Columbia	1987	IHRA	.25 miles (0.40 km)
Piste D'Accélération Pont-Rouge	Pont-Rouge	Quebec	1966		.25 miles (0.40 km)
Race City Motorsport Park	Calgary; 50.94369°N 113.93166°W	Alberta	1985–2011	IHRA	.25 miles (0.40 km)
Raceway Park	Oyster Bed Bridge	Prince Edward Island	1971–2018		.25 miles (0.40 km)
Sanair	Saint-Pie; 45.5291°N 72.8837°W	Quebec	1970		.25 miles (0.40 km)
Saratoga Speedway	Courtenay	British Columbia			.0625 miles (0.1006 km)
Saskatchewan International Raceway	Saskatoon	Saskatchewan		IHRA	.25 miles (0.40 km)
Shannonville Motorsport Park	Shannonville; 44.2254°N 77.1600°W	Ontario			.25 miles (0.40 km)
St. Thomas Raceway Park	St. Thomas	Ontario	1962	NHRA	.25 miles (0.40 km)
Swift Current Airport Drags	Swift Current	Saskatchewan			
Terrace Drags	Terrace	British Columbia			.125 miles (0.201 km)
Terrace Bay Dragfest	Terrace Bay	Ontario			.25 miles (0.40 km)
Thunder In The Alberni Valley	Port Alberni	British Columbia			.25 miles (0.40 km)
Thunder In The Valley	Drayton Valley	Alberta			.25 miles (0.40 km)
Thunder Mountain Raceway	Kelowna	British Columbia			.25 miles (0.40 km)
Toronto Motorsports Park	Cayuga; 42°54′8″N 79°51′10″W	Ontario	1955	NHRA	.25 miles (0.40 km)
Western Speedway	Victoria	British Columbia			.0946 miles (0.1522 km)
Yellowhead Road Runners Runway Drags	Neepawa	Manitoba			.125 miles (0.201 km)
Yorkton Airport Drags	Yorkton	Saskatchewan			
