= Atlantic Motorsport Park =

All-purpose motorsports facility in Canada

Atlantic Motorsport Park (AMP)

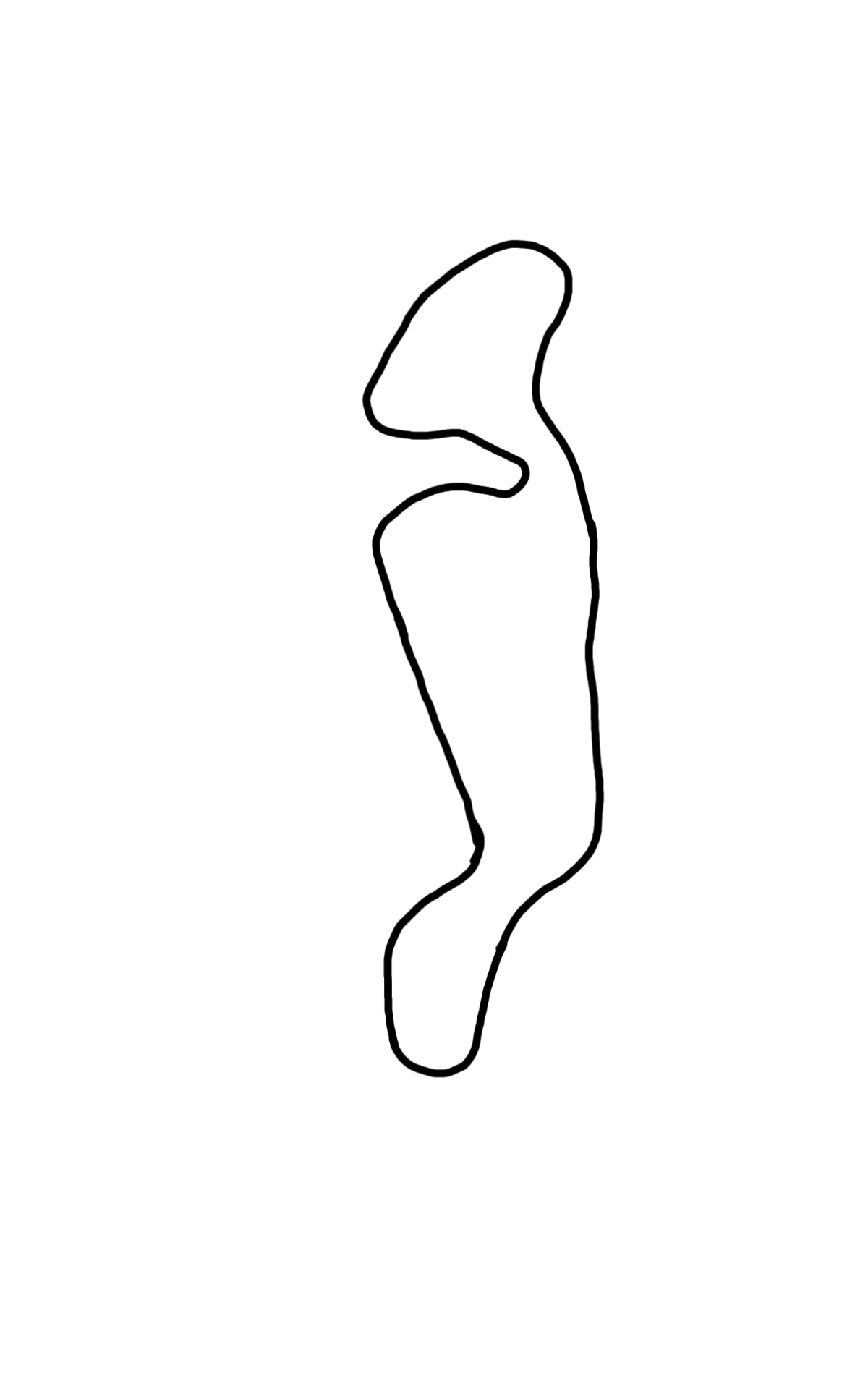
- Map of the Atlantic Motorsports Park Circuit
- Location: Shubenacadie, Nova Scotia, Canada
- Coordinates: 45°08′42″N 63°26′55″W
- Opened: August 1974; 51 years ago
- Major events: Current: Canadian Superbike Championship (1987–2019, 2022–present); Former: Atlantic Championship (1974–1977, 1979)
- Website: http://www.atlanticmotorsportpark.com/

Full Circuit (1974–present)
- Surface: Asphalt
- Length: 1.600 mi (2.575 km)
- Turns: 11
- Race lap record: 1:01.489 ( (United States) Howdy Holmes, March 79B, 1979, Formula Atlantic)

Atlantic Motorsport Park (AMP) is an all-purpose motorsports facility located near Shubenacadie, Nova Scotia. The 11-turn road course was opened in August, 1974, and is situated on a 116.56-hectare (1.2 km^{2}) site.

== History ==
One of the most unusual things about AMP is that it was designed, built and operated since August, 1974 by a volunteer group of motorsport enthusiasts, from the automobile, snowmobile and motorcycle racing groups. It has also hosted a Country and Western Festival. It remains completely owned by its membership club and is believed to be the only track in North America that hosts a national series competition that is volunteer run.

AMP has hosted notable auto racing categories, including Formula Atlantic and a NASCAR race in the 1970s.

At present, AMP hosts an annual round of the Canadian Superbike Championship.

From May through October the track is busy with several local motorcycle and car clubs activities. The Atlantic Roadracing League runs a full schedule of motorcycle racing. The Atlantic Region Motor Sports Club (ARMS) uses it for their sedan and formula racing schedules. The Atlantic Sports Car Club (ASCC) uses it for their SoloSprint events. There are also a number of Advanced Performance Driving and Race Schools throughout the season.

=== CASC Atlantic Championship ===
Atlantic Motorsport Park hosted the CASC Player's Challenge Series (Atlantic Championship) from 1974 to 1977 and again in 1979.

Year	Date	Driver	Car
1974	August 18	(Canada) Bill Brack	Chevron B27
1975	August 17	(Canada) Bill Brack	Chevron B29
1976	August 8	(Canada) Gilles Villeneuve	March 76B
1977	August 7	(Canada) Bill Brack	March 77B
1979	July 1	(United States) Jeff Wood	March 79B

== Lap records ==
The unofficial lap record of 1:00.00 seconds was set in a Formula Atlantic Event in 1975 by Canadian racing legend Gilles Villeneuve. The circuit also featured the Canadian Honda Civic challenge in the 1980s. As of June 2026, the fastest official race lap records at Atlantic Motorsport Park are listed as:

Category	Time	Driver	Vehicle	Event
Full Circuit (1974–present): 2.575 km (1.600 mi)
Formula Atlantic	1:01.489	Howdy Holmes	March 79B	1979 Shubenacadie Formula Atlantic round
Superbike	1:07.732	Jordan Szoke	Kawasaki Ninja ZX-10RR	2026 Shubenacadie CSBK round
Supersport	1:08.231	Torin Collins	Yamaha YZF-R9	2026 Shubenacadie CSBK round

== See also ==
- List of auto racing tracks in Canada
