= Circuit Mont-Tremblant =

Race track in Quebec, Canada

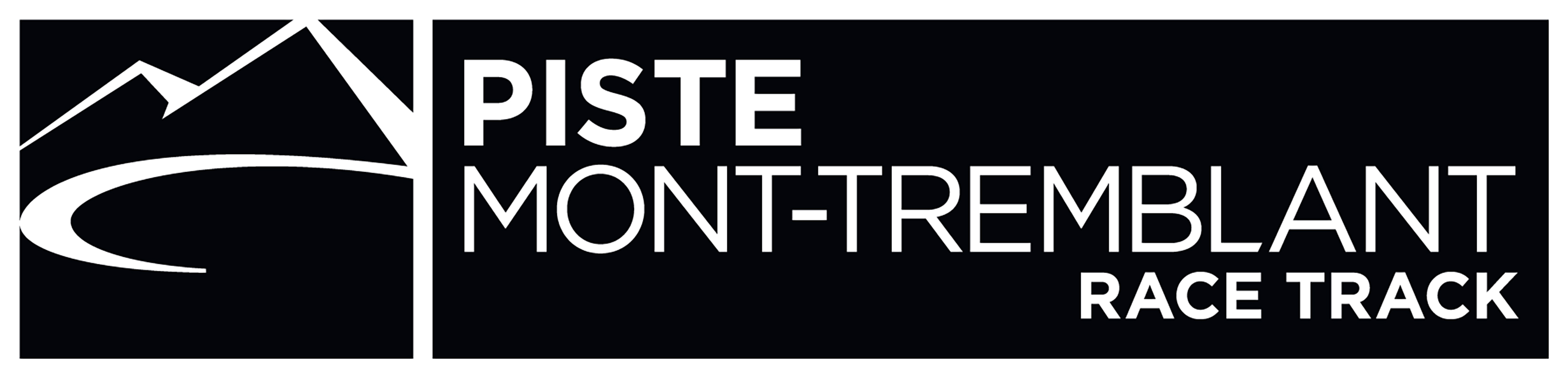

- Circuit Mont-Tremblant
- Location: 1281 Chemin du Village; Mont-Tremblant, Quebec, Canada
- Coordinates: 46°11′15.74″N 74°36′35.77″W
- Owner: 11938053 Canada Inc. (2022–present)
- Opened: 3 August 1964; 61 years ago
- Former names: Circuit Mont-Tremblant-St-Jovite
- Major events: Former: Formula One; Canadian Grand Prix (1968, 1970); Can-Am; Mont-Tremblant Can-Am (1966, 1969–1971, 1977–1978); Trans-Am; Trois Heures du Circuit (1968–1971, 1977–1978); USAC Championship Car; Saint-Jovite 200 (1967–1968); Rolex Sports Car Series; 6 Hours of Mont-Tremblant (2002–2005); Champ Car World Series; Mont-Tremblant Champ Car Grand Prix (2007); Canadian Superbike Championship (2003–2004, 2006–2007, 2012–2013); Canadian Touring Car Championship (2012–2013)

Road Course (2004–present)
- Surface: Asphalt
- Length: 2.621 mi (4.218 km)
- Turns: 17
- Race lap record: 1:17.327 ( (France) Sébastien Bourdais, Panoz DP01, 2007, Champ Car)

North Course (2004–present)
- Surface: Asphalt
- Length: 1.529 mi (2.460 km)
- Turns: 12
- Race lap record: 1:21.691 ( (Canada) Jordan Szoke, Kawasaki Ninja ZX-10R, 2008, SBK)

South Course (2004–present)
- Surface: Asphalt
- Length: 1.187 mi (1.910 km)
- Turns: 7

Road Course (1965–2003)
- Surface: Asphalt
- Length: 2.650 mi (4.265 km)
- Turns: 15
- Race lap record: 1:24.201 ( (Switzerland) Fredy Lienhard, Jr., Dallara SP1, 2002, LMP900)

Original North Road Course (1964–2002)
- Surface: Asphalt
- Length: 1.560 mi (2.510 km)
- Turns: 12
- Race lap record: 1:09.900 ( (United States) Jim Hall, Chaparral 2A, 1965, Group 4)

Circuit Mont-Tremblant is a 4.218 km (2.621 mi) road racing circuit located in Mont-Tremblant, Quebec, approximately 130 km (81 mi) north of Montreal, Canada. It is the second-oldest racing circuit in the country. Originally known as Circuit Mont-Tremblant–St-Jovite, the venue was renamed in the 1970s. Situated near the Mont-Tremblant ski resort, the circuit features a twisting fifteen-corner layout that follows the natural topography and elevation changes of the surrounding terrain.

== History ==
The concept for Circuit Mont-Tremblant originated with local business owners and hoteliers seeking to extend tourism beyond the winter ski season. Construction was completed in two phases. The original 2.510 km (1.560 mi) layout opened in 1964, and the circuit was extended the following year to 4.265 km (2.650 mi).

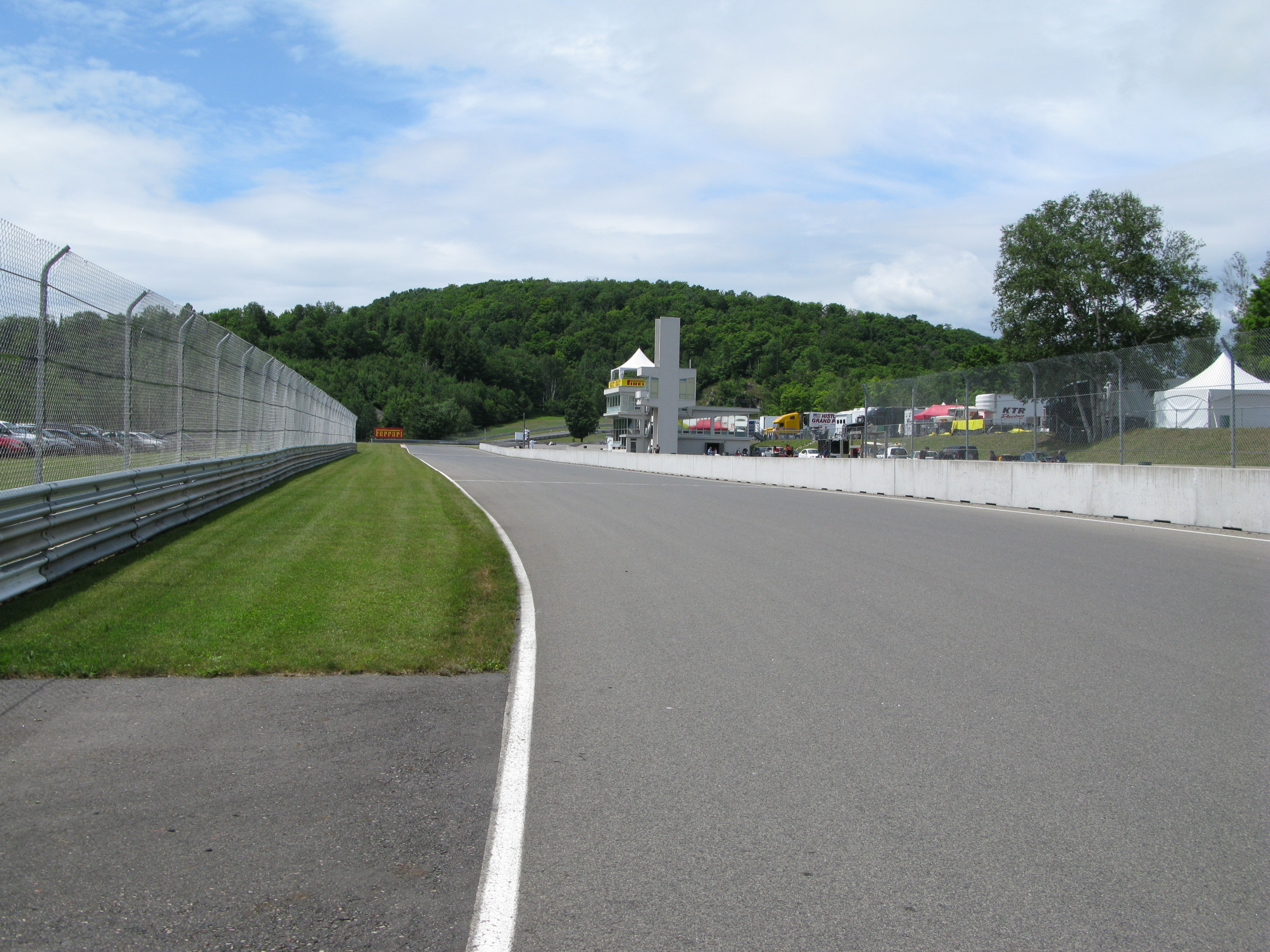
The Control Tower and start-finish straight, looking west against the flow of the circuit, towards the Namerow corner.

=== The 1960s – 1970s ===
Circuit Mont-Tremblant hosted its inaugural race on 3 August 1964 on the original twelve-corner layout. By September of that year, construction of the bridge, pit stalls, and media and officials’ facilities had been completed, enabling the circuit to host sports car and prototype events.

The expanded circuit debuted in September 1965 with the Player's Quebec Sports Car Race. On 11 September 1966, the circuit hosted its first Canadian-American Challenge Cup (Can-Am) race. In 1967 and 1968, it hosted consecutive USAC Indy Car twin 100-mile double-header events.

The circuit hosted the Formula One Canadian Grand Prix on two occasions, in 1968 and 1970. The 1970 event was notable for marking the Formula One debut of Tyrrell Racing as a constructor.

Throughout the late 1960s and 1970s, Circuit Mont-Tremblant was a regular venue for major North American racing series, including Can-Am, Trans-Am, Formula 5000, and Formula Atlantic.

Notable drivers who competed at Circuit Mont-Tremblant during this period include Mario Andretti, Chris Amon, Alan Jones, A. J. Foyt, Gordon Johncock, Parnelli Jones, Jacky Ickx, Denny Hulme, Bruce McLaren, Mark Donohue, Dan Gurney, Roger Penske, Peter Revson, Jochen Rindt, Jackie Stewart, John Surtees, Al and Bobby Unser, and Gilles Villeneuve.

=== The 1980s – 1990s ===
During the 1980s and 1990s, Circuit Mont-Tremblant regularly hosted prominent Canadian national racing series, including the Rothmans Porsche (Turbo) Cup, Players GM Challenge Series, Honda-Michelin Series, Export A Formula 2000, and the Canadian Formula 1600 Championship. These series played a significant role in the development of Canadian racing talent, including Paul Tracy, Scott Goodyear, Ron Fellows, Greg Moore, Richard Spenard, Patrick Carpentier, and Alex Tagliani.

=== The Jim Russell Racing School ===
Circuit Mont-Tremblant is home to the Jim Russell Racing Driver School, established in 1969. The school has produced a number of internationally successful drivers, including Gilles Villeneuve, Jacques Villeneuve, Lance Stroll, and Nicholas Latifi.

A CIK-FIA–rated karting facility was added in 2010 to support driver development programs and has hosted Canadian national karting events.

=== The 2000s – present ===
In the 2000s, new ownership initiatives focused on upgrading the facility to improved FIA standards while preserving the circuit's original character. Improvements included track resurfacing and widening, pit lane expansion, and increased run-off areas. These upgrades enabled the return of major racing categories, including sports car racing, open-wheel events, superbike racing, and historic motorsport.

The circuit continues to be used extensively for club racing, corporate events, manufacturer programs, and vehicle launches. On 21 July 2022, the Circuit Mont-Tremblant complex was acquired by 11938053 Canada Inc., a company owned by Montreal businessman Gad Bitton of the Holand Automotive Group.

== Events ==
Current

- May: Classique Printemps
- July: Classique Été
- September: Classique Automne

Former

- Atlantic Championship (1975–1976, 2007–2008)
- Can-Am
  - Mont-Tremblant Can-Am (1966, 1969–1971, 1977–1978)
- Canadian Superbike Championship (2003–2004, 2006–2007, 2012–2013)
- Canadian Touring Car Championship (2012–2013)
- Champ Car World Series
  - Mont-Tremblant Champ Car Grand Prix (2007)
- Formula One
  - Canadian Grand Prix (1968, 1970)
- Grand-Am Cup (1998, 2002–2004)
- IMSA GT3 Cup Challenge Canada (2012, 2019)
- Rolex Sports Car Series
  - 6 Hours of Mont-Tremblant (2002–2005)
- SCCA Continental Championship (1967, 1969–1970)
- Trans-Am Series
  - Trois Heures du Circuit (1968–1971, 1977–1978)
- USAC Championship Car
  - Saint-Jovite 200 (1967–1968)
- United States Road Racing Championship (1968)

== Former series and major race winners ==
=== FIA Formula One World Championship ===
Year	Race	Driver	Constructor	Report
1968	Player's Canadian Grand Prix	(New Zealand) Denny Hulme	McLaren-Ford	Report
1970	Player's Canadian Grand Prix	(Belgium) Jacky Ickx	Ferrari	Report

=== Champ Car World Series ===
Year	Race	Driver	Team	Chassis	Engine	Report
2007	Mont-Tremblant Champ Car Grand Prix	(Netherlands) Robert Doornbos	Minardi Team USA	Panoz DP01	Cosworth	Report

=== USAC Championship Car (IndyCar) ===
Year	Race	Driver	Team	Chassis	Engine
1967	Labatt Indy	(United States) Mario Andretti	Dean Racing Enterprises	Brawner Hawk	Ford
1968	Saint-Jovite 200	(United States) Mario Andretti	Andretti Racing Enterprises	Brawner Hawk	Ford

=== SCCA Can-Am Series ===
Year	Date	Race	Driver	Team
1966	Sept 11	Player's 200	(United Kingdom) John Surtees	(United Kingdom) #3 Team Surtees
1969	June 15	Labatt's 50	(New Zealand) Denny Hulme	(United Kingdom) #5 McLaren Cars
1970	June 28	Mont-Tremblant 50	(United States) Dan Gurney	(United Kingdom) #48 Bruce McLaren Motor Racing
1971	June 27	Mont-Tremblant 50	(United Kingdom) Jackie Stewart	(United States) #1 Carl Haas Racing
1977	June 12		(United States) Tom Klausler	(United States) Schkee Cars
1978	June 25		(United States) George Follmer	(United States) U.S. Racing

=== SCCA Trans-Am Series ===
Year	Date	Race	Drivers	Car	Distance/Duration
1968	July 21	Les Trois Heures du Circuit	(United States) Mark Donohue	Chevrolet Camaro	3 Hours / 96 Laps; 254.4 mi (409.4 km)
1969	Aug 3	Les Trois Heures du Circuit	(United States) Mark Donohue	Chevrolet Camaro	3 Hours / 97 Laps; 257 mi (414 km)
1970	Aug 2	Le Circuit Trans-Am	(United States) Mark Donohue	AMC Javelin	70 Laps; 185.5 mi (298.5 km)
1970	Aug 2	Le Circuit Trans-Am	(United States) Mark Donohue	AMC Javelin	70 Laps; 185.5 mi (298.5 km)
1971	Aug 1	Player's Quebec Trans-Am	(United States) Mark Donohue	AMC Javelin	70 Laps; 185.5 mi (298.5 km)
1977	Sept 11	Molson Trans-Am	(United States) Peter Gregg	Porsche 934	38 Laps; 100.7 mi (162.1 km)
1978	June 25	Molson Trans-Am	(United States) Monte Shelton	Porsche 935	38 Laps; 100.7 mi (162.1 km)

=== SCCA United States Road Racing Championship ===
Year	Date	Race	Over 2.0 Winning Driver	Over 2.0 Winning Team	Under 2.0 Winning Driver	Under 2.0 Winning Team
1968	June 2	Championnat Nord-Americain	(United States) Mark Donohue	#6 Roger Penske Racing	(Canada) Horst Kroll	#37 Altona Motors

=== SCCA Formula 5000 ===
Year	Date	Race	Driver	Chassis	Engine
1967	Sept 17	St Jovite Grand Prix	(United States) Fred Ashplant	Brabham BT21	Ford
1969	Sept 7	Le Circuit Continental	(United Kingdom) David Hobbs	Surtees TS5	Chevrolet
1970	Aug 1	Le Circuit Continental	(United States) George Follmer	Lotus 70	Ford

=== Atlantic Championship ===
Year	Date	Driver
1975	July 6	(United States) Elliott Forbes-Robinson
1976	July 11	(Canada) Gilles Villeneuve
2007	July 1	(France) Franck Perera
2008	June 29	(Netherlands) Junior Strous

=== Grand American Road Racing Championship ===
Year	Date	Race	Driver	Team	Chassis	Engine
2002	Sept 15	6 Heures du Circuit Mont-Tremblant	(Belgium) Didier Theys (Switzerland) Fredy Lienhard Sr. (Switzerland) Fredy Lienhard Jr.	(United States) #27 Doran Lista Racing	Dallara LMP	Judd
2003	Sept 21	6 Heures du Circuit Mont-Tremblant	(United States) David Donohue (United States) Mike Borkowski (Germany) Sascha Maassen	(United States) #58 Brumos Racing	Fabcar FDSC/03	Porsche
2004	May 23	6 Heures du Circuit Mont-Tremblant	(United States) Scott Pruett (Italy) Max Papis	(United States) #01 CompUSA Chip Ganassi with Felix Sabates	Riley MkXI	Lexus
2005	May 21	6 Heures du Circuit Mont-Tremblant	(Venezuela) Milka Duno (United Kingdom) Andy Wallace (Netherlands) Jan Lammers	(United States) #2 CITGO Howard-Boss Motorsports	Crawford DP03	Pontiac

=== Canadian Superbike Championship ===
Year	Date	Driver	Motorcycle
2003	August 17	(United States) Tom Kipp	Kawasaki ZX-7RR
2004	August 22	(Canada) Jordan Szoke	Honda CBR1000RR
2006	June 4	(Canada) Jordan Szoke	Kawasaki ZX-10RR
2007	June 3	(Canada) Jordan Szoke	Kawasaki ZX-10RR
2012	August 12	(Canada) Jordan Szoke	BMW S1000RR
2013	August 25	(Canada) Jordan Szoke	BMW S1000RR

== Lap records ==
As of September 2019, the fastest official race lap records at Circuit Mont-Tremblant (St. Jovite) are listed as:

Category	Time	Driver	Vehicle	Event
Road Course (2004–present): 4.218 km (2.621 mi)
Champ Car	1:17.327	Sébastien Bourdais	Panoz DP01	Champ Car Mont-Tremblant 07
Formula Atlantic	1:21.157	Carl Skerlong	Swift 016.a	2007 Mont-Tremblant Formula Atlantic round
Daytona Prototype	1:29.308	Max Angelelli	Riley MkXI	2004 6 Hours of Mont-Tremblant
GT1 (GTS)	1:31.856	Tommy Riggins	Ford Mustang	2003 6 Hours of Mont-Tremblant
GT	1:35.910	Cort Wagner	Ferrari 360 Modena GT	2003 6 Hours of Mont-Tremblant
Porsche Carrera Cup	1:36.610	Parker Thompson	Porsche 911 (991 II) GT3 Cup	2019 Mont-Tremblant Porsche GT3 Cup Challenge round
Superbike	1:39.711	Jordan Szoke	BMW S1000RR	2013 Mont-Tremblant CSBK round
Supersport	1:42.080	Francis Martin	Suzuki GSX-R600	2007 Mont-Tremblant CSBK round
SGS	1:42.301	Randy Pobst	Porsche 911 (996) GT3 Cup	2004 6 Hours of Mont-Tremblant
F1600	1:43.418	Michel Bonnet	Vector MG95	2011 Mont-Tremblant Canadian F1600 round
ST	1:46.847	Mathieu Audette	Acura RSX Type S	2013 Mont-Tremblant CTCC round
North Road Course: (2004–present): 2.460 km (1.529 mi)
Superbike	1:21.691	Jordan Szoke	Kawasaki Ninja ZX-10R	2008 Mont-Tremblant CSBK round
Supersport	1:23.482	Chris Peris	Suzuki GSX-R600	2008 Mont-Tremblant CSBK round
Road Course (1965–2003): 4.260 km (2.647 mi)
LMP900	1:24.201	Fredy Lienhard, Jr.	Dallara SP1	2002 6 Hours of Mont-Tremblant
DP	1:31.176	Terry Borcheller	Doran JE4	2003 6 Hours of Mont-Tremblant
LMP675	1:31.803	Andy Lally	Picchio D-USA-BMW	2002 6 Hours of Mont-Tremblant
F1	1:32.200	Clay Regazzoni	Ferrari 312B	1970 Canadian Grand Prix
Can-Am	1:33.400	Alan Jones	Lola T333CS	1978 Mont-Tremblant Can-Am round
Formula Atlantic	1:35.033	Gilles Villeneuve	March 76B	1976 Mont-Tremblant Formula Atlantic round
American GT	1:35.233	Rob Morgan	Chevrolet Corvette	2002 6 Hours of Mont-Tremblant
GT	1:35.975	Bill Auberlen	Ferrari 360 Modena GT	2002 6 Hours of Mont-Tremblant
Formula 5000	1:39.000	George Follmer	Lotus 70	1970 Mont-Tremblant F5000 round
Trans-Am	1:41.513	Ludwig Heimrath	Porsche 934/5	1977 Mont-Tremblant Trans-Am round
Group 7	1:44.900	Bruce McLaren	McLaren-Elva Mk.IIB Chevrolet	1966 Labatt 50
Group 4	1:46.200	John Surtees	Lola T70 Mk.2	1965 Player's Québec Mont-Tremblant
Porsche Carrera Cup	1:46.932	Michael Levitas	Porsche 911 (996) GT3 Cup	2002 6 Hours of Mont-Tremblant
Group 2	1:52.100	Sam Posey	Chevrolet Camaro	1968 Mont-Tremblant 3 Hours
Group 3	1:56.700	Jean-Paul Ostiguy	AC Cobra	1967 St. Jean 67, U.S.A.M. Mont-Tremblant
Original North Road Course (1964–2003): 2.510 km (1.560 mi)
Group 4	1:09.900	Jim Hall	Chaparral 2A	1965 La Course Labatt 50
Prototype	1:16.600	Pedro Rodríguez (Note: Both drivers took the same lap time in the same race independently.); Ludwig Heimrath	Ferrari 275 P Cooper T61	1964 Player's Québec Trophy
Formula Junior	1:20.800	Walt Mackay (Note: Both drivers took the same lap time in different races independently.); Norm Evenden	Lotus 18; Cooper-Chevrolet	1964 Regional Mont-Tremblant (Invitational); 1964 Regional Mont-Tremblant (Trophy)
Group 3	1:21.700	Jean Ouellet	AC Cobra	1964 Regional Mont-Tremblant (Main)

== See also ==
- List of auto racing tracks in Canada
- Other Montreal area race tracks
  - Circuit Gilles Villeneuve
  - Circuit ICAR
  - Sanair Super Speedway
