= Calabogie Motorsports Park =

Motorsports park in eastern Ontario, Canada

CMP
- Location: 462 Wilson Farm Road; Calabogie, Ontario, Canada
- Coordinates: 45°18′10″N 76°40′20″W
- Opened: September 2006; 19 years ago
- Architect: Alan Wilson
- Major events: Current: NASCAR Canada Series; NAPA 150 (2025–present); Canadian Superbike Championship (2008–2009, 2015, 2020–2022, 2026); Former: Sports Car Championship Canada (2021–2022, 2024); Canadian Touring Car Championship (2007–2009, 2012–2014, 2016–2020); IMSA GT3 Cup Challenge Canada (2011–2015); Lamborghini Super Trofeo North America (2013)
- Website: http://www.calabogiemotorsports.com/

Full Circuit (2006–present)
- Surface: Polymer Modified Asphalt (Koch Stylink PG 70-34)
- Length: 5.050 km (3.138 mi)
- Turns: 20
- Race lap record: 2:00.548 ( (Canada) Ben Young, Honda CBR1000RR-SP, 2026, SBK)

East Circuit (2006–present)
- Length: 2.810 km (1.746 mi)
- Turns: 13
- Race lap record: 1:04.849 ( (Canada) Brady Clapham, Radical SR3, 2026, Radical Cup)

West Circuit (2006–present)
- Length: 2.200 km (1.367 mi)
- Turns: 8

Calabogie Motorsports Park is the longest road course in Canada, at 5.050 km (3.138 mi), located 4 km (2.5 mi) east of the community of Calabogie in the township of Greater Madawaska, Ontario, Canada. It hosts regional road racing and is the main circuit in the Ottawa metropolitan area.

== Events ==
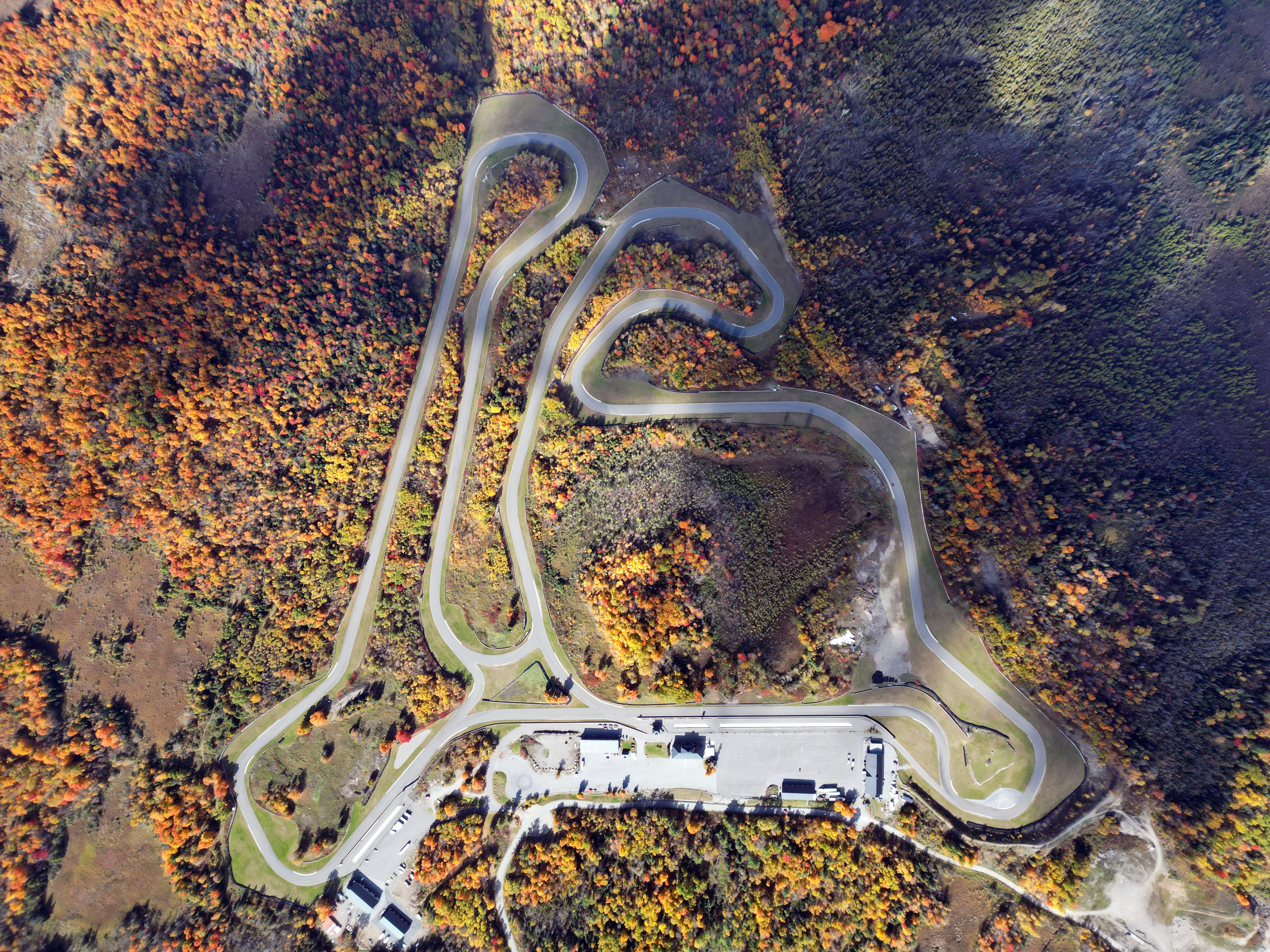
Aerial photo of the road course, taken in October 2022

The park has been the venue for numerous club racing events since its opening in September 2006. Additionally, it was the site of the Castrol Canadian Touring Championship from 2007 to 2009.The track hosted the opening round of the Canadian Superbike Championship in 2008 on the Stadium track and on the full track in 2009. The inaugural race of the Porsche 911 GT3 Cup Challenge took place from May 14 to May 15, 2011. This marked the first time the Challenge, which featured 120 events and 255 championship rounds in 2011, was brought to Canada. The park has also been utilized as a testing track for the Harley-Davidson XR1200 and Ford GT. In July 2025, the track hosted a race for the NASCAR Canada Series for the first time.

== List of events ==
Current

- June: Canadian Superbike Championship
- July: NASCAR Canada Series, Radical Cup Canada
- August: Calabogie Cup Race Weekend

Former

- Canadian Touring Car Championship (2007–2009, 2012–2014, 2016–2020)
- IMSA GT3 Cup Challenge Canada (2011–2015)
- Lamborghini Super Trofeo North America (2013)
- Sports Car Championship Canada (2021–2022, 2024)

== Lap records ==
Bruno St-Jacques held the unofficial lap record with a lap of 1:52.014 with Stohr WR1 in 2013. As of July 2026, the fastest official race lap records at the Calabogie Motorsports Park are listed as:

Category	Time	Driver	Vehicle	Event
Full Circuit (2006–present): 5.050 km (3.138 mi)
Superbike	2:00.548	Ben Young	Honda CBR1000RR-SP	2026 Calabogie CSBK round
Porsche Carrera Cup	2:00.832	Chris Green	Porsche 911 (991 I) GT3 Cup	2014 Calabogie IMSA GT3 Cup Challenge Canada round
Radical Cup	2:03.190	Jonathan Woolridge	Radical SR3 SRX	2022 1st Calabogie Radical Cup Canada round
Supersport	2:04.100	Elliot Vieira	Yamaha YZF-R6	2022 Calabogie CSBK round
GT4	2:09.477	Marco Signoretti	Ford Mustang GT4	2021 Calabogie Sports Car Championship Canada round
TCR Touring Car	2:10.021	Jerimy Daniel	Audi RS 3 LMS TCR (2021)	2022 1st Calabogie Sports Car Championship Canada round
East Circuit (2006–present): 2.810 km (1.746 mi)
Radical Cup	1:04.849	Brady Clapham	Radical SR3	2026 Calabogie Radical Cup Canada round
NASCAR Canada	1:10.763	Alex Tagliani	Chevrolet Camaro NASCAR	2026 NAPA 150

== See also ==
- List of auto racing tracks in Canada
