= Grand Bend Motorplex =

Motorsports facility near Grand Bend, Ontario

- Location: Grand Bend, Ontario, Canada
- Coordinates: 43°17′28″N 81°43′06″W
- Owner: Grand Bend Racing Inc.
- Major events: Current: IHRA Nitro Jam; IHRA Mopar Canadian Nationals (2000–present); Canadian Superbike Championship (2017–2019, 2022–2024, 2026)

Drag Strip
- Length: 0.402 km (0.250 mi)

Road Course
- Length: 2.200 km (1.367 mi)
- Turns: 11
- Race lap record: 1:02.837 ( (United Kingdom) Ben Young, BMW M1000RR, 2023, SBK)

Tri-Oval
- Surface: Asphalt
- Length: 0.402 km (0.250 mi)
- Banking: 12

Motocross Track
- Surface: Dirt
- Length: 1.4 km (0.87 mi)
- Turns: 29

Grand Bend Motorplex is a dedicated multi-use motorsports facility located southeast of Grand Bend, Ontario, Canada. It features IHRA Championship Drag Racing on its 0.250 mi (0.402 km) dragstrip, home of the annual IHRA Mopar Canadian Nationals, Canada's longest running and largest national drag race. The venue also has a road course used for road motorcycling, as well as two competitive motocross tracks.

Special features include concerts with some of Canada's recording stars and an onsite motorhome area and camping compound. The park also includes a dedicated kid's play area, multiple washroom and shower buildings, souvenir store and four separate concession buildings serving a variety of food.

== Lap records ==
As of July 2026, the fastest official race lap records at Grand Bend Motorplex are listed as:

Category	Time	Driver	Vehicle	Event
Road Course: 2.200 km (1.367 mi)
Superbike	1:02.837	Ben Young	BMW M1000RR	2023 Grand Bend CSBK round
Supersport	1:04.206	Nathan Playford	Ducati Panigale V2	2026 Grand Bend CSBK round

== See also ==
- List of auto racing tracks in Canada
- Grand Bend Airport
