= Toronto Motorsports Park =

Racing facility in Cayuga, Ontario

Coordinates: 42°54′8″N 79°51′10″W

- Location: Cayuga, Ontario, Canada
- Operator: Uli Bieri
- Opened: 1955
- Former names: Kohler Drag Strip, Kohler Superboss Dragway, Cayuga 1320 Dragway, Cayuga Dragway, Cayuga Motorsports Park, Cayuga Dragway Park
- Major events: IHRA Nitro Jam; Canadian Nationals (2002–2007)

Drag strip
- Length: 0.4 km (1/4 miles)

Road Racing Park
- Length: 3 km (1.86 miles)
- Turns: 14

Club Circuit
- Length: 1.8 km (1.12 miles)
- Turns: 8

Training Circuit
- Length: 1.2 km (0.74 miles)
- Turns: 5

Toronto Motorsports Park is a dragway and 3-kilometre roadcourse racing facility in Haldimand County, near the town of Cayuga, Ontario, Canada.

Toronto Motorsports Park held the IHRA ACDelco Canadian Nationals, which attracted hundreds of cars from around Canada and the U.S., until 2007.

As of 2024, it runs numerous open track days at both the 1/4 mile drag strip and road course where people can take their cars to the track and push them in a non-competitive environment. It also hosts motorcycle training, Ontario Time Attack competitions, exotic car and F2000 racecar track rentals, and group track rentals.

== See also ==
- List of auto racing tracks in Canada
