= RAD Torque Raceway =

Auto racing facility in Alberta, Canada

- Location: 50342 Range Road 253, Leduc County, Alberta, T9E 0V6
- Coordinates: 53°20′1.68″N 113°35′28.32″W
- Capacity: 4,500 (clay oval); 8,500 (drag strip)
- Owner: Glen Stenabaugh (November 2023–present)
- Operator: Glen Stenabaugh (November 2023–present)
- Opened: 1991
- Construction cost: C$4 million ($7.93 million in 2025 dollars)
- Former names: Capital City Raceway Park; Capital Raceway; Labatt Raceway; Budweiser Motorsports Park; Castrol Raceway
- Major events: Current: IHRA Nitro Jam; Mopar Rocky Mountain Nitro Jam Nationals (2003–present); Former: Canadian Superbike Championship (2015, 2024–2025); World of Outlaws Sprint Car Series Oil City Cup (2007–2015)
- Website: https://www.radraceway.com/

Clay Oval (1991–present)
- Length: 0.604 km (0.375 mi)
- Turns: 2
- Banking: Turns: 9°

Road Course (2013–present)
- Length: 2.700 km (1.678 mi)
- Turns: 14
- Race lap record: 1:16.795 ( (Canada) Samuel Guerin, BMW M1000RR, 2025, SBK)

Drag Strip (1992–present)
- Length: 0.402 km (0.250 mi)

RAD Torque Raceway, formerly known as Capital City Raceway Park, Capital Raceway, Labatt Raceway, Budweiser Motorsports Park, and Castrol Raceway, is a multi-track auto racing facility located just south of Edmonton, Alberta, Canada, on land leased from the Edmonton International Airport.

== History ==
The clay oval opened in 1991 and the dragstrip opened in 1992. The facility went into receivership at the end of the 1997 season. It was purchased by Rob Reeves and ten other local racers and businessmen, and re-opened in 1998. Several of the investors have opted out since 2000 but remain as advertising sponsors of the facility. The track's sole owner and operator, Rob Reeves, announced in November 2023 that Glen Stenabaugh would become the new owner of the facility.

== Features ==
The facility features an 12,000-seat 0.250 mi (0.402 km) NHRA-sanctioned dragstrip, and a 4,500-seat 0.375 mi (0.604 km) clay oval. There is also a pro motocross track, a mini-sprint car track, and a 2.700 km (1.678 mi) road course which opened in 2013.

== Events ==
The biggest event currently held at the facility is on the drag strip. The annual NHRA Mopar Rocky Mountain Nationals is the largest national event held in Canada. The second largest event at the raceway was held on the oval track. The Oil City Cup featured the World of Outlaws Sprint Car Series from 2007 to 2015.

In November 2021, the facility was renamed to RAD Torque Raceway in a five-year deal between the track's owners and Abbotsford-based RAD Torque Systems.

Logo until 2022

== Lap records ==
As of July 2025, the fastest official race lap records at RAD Torque Raceway are listed as:

Category	Time	Driver	Vehicle	Event
Road Course (2013–present): 2.700 km (1.678 mi)
Superbike	1:16.795	Samuel Guerin	BMW M1000RR	2025 Edmonton CSBK round
Supersport	1:18.279	Torin Collins	Suzuki GSX-R750	2025 Edmonton CSBK round

== See also ==
- List of auto racing tracks in Canada
