= Clarenville Dragway =

Drag racing strip in Canada

Coordinates: 48.2748°N 53.9235°W

The Clarenville Dragway was a drag racing strip located just outside Clarenville, Newfoundland and Labrador. It was the only dragstrip in the province at the time, and the site doubled as Clarenville Airport. The Clarenville Dragway closed in 2014 being replaced by Eastbound Park in Avondale Newfoundland.
