= Ben Young (motorcyclist) =

Scottish motorcycle racer

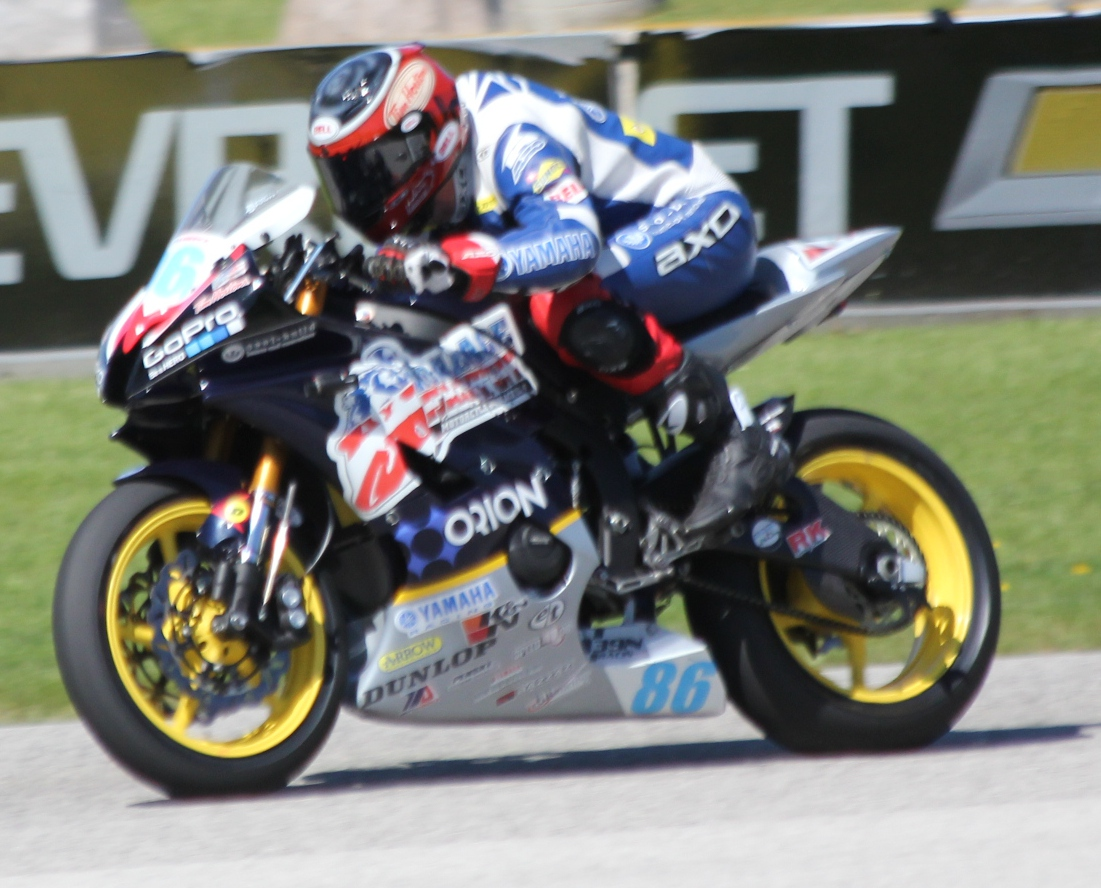
- Young riding at Road America during the 2015 MotoAmerica Supersport season
- Nationality: Canadian
- Born: 8 June 1993 (age 33); Bathgate, Scotland
- Current team: Van Dolder's Home Team Honda
- Bike number: 1

Ben Young (born 8 June 1993) is a Grand Prix motorcycle racer and superbike racer born in Scotland and raised in Collingwood, Ontario, Canada. He is a five-time Canadian Superbike champion, winning his first title in 2019 before adding consecutive championships in 2022, 2023, and 2024 aboard a BMW S1000RR.

== Career statistics ==
=== Career highlights ===
- 2022 – 1st, Canadian Superbike Championship (Pro Superbike), BMW S1000RR.
- 2023 – 1st, Canadian Superbike Championship (Pro Superbike), BMW S1000RR.

=== By class ===
==== Canadian Superbike Championship ====
Season	Class	Motorcycle	Team	Number	Races	Wins	Podiums	Poles	Pts	Pos.
2023	Superbike	BMW M1000RR	Van Dolder's Home Team BMW	#1	10	6	8	2	228	1st
2022	Superbike	BMW S1000RR	Van Dolder's Home Team BMW	#86	9	5	9	2	225	1st
2021	Superbike	BMW S1000RR	Van Dolder's Home Team BMW	#86	7	1	7	2	310	2nd
2019	Superbike	BMW S1000RR	Scot-Build BMW	#86	7	3	6	4	326	1st
2018	Superbike	BMW S1000RR	Scot-Build BMW	#86	7	1	7	2	317	2nd
2017	Superbike	BMW S1000RR	Scot-Build BMW	#86	7	0	3	0	226	3rd
2016	Superbike	BMW S1000RR	Tim Horton's Scot-Build BMW	#86	7	0	5	0	225	3rd
Total					54	16	45	12		

==== Daytona 200 ====
Year	Motorcycle	Team	Number	Qualifying	Finish
2024	Suzuki GSXR-750	Team BATTLAX	#86	20th	9th
2023	Yamaha YZF-R6	BPM Motorsports	#86	16th	DNF
2013	Yamaha YZF-R6	Tim Horton's Yamaha	#86	17th	8th
2012	Yamaha YZF-R6	Scot-Build Yamaha	#86	17th	20th

==== MotoAmerica ====
Season	Class	Motorcycle	Team	Number	Races	Wins	Podiums	Poles	Pts	Pos.
2015	SuperSport	Yamaha	Road Race Factory	#86	13	0	1	0	99	8th

==== British Superbike Championship ====
Season	Class	Motorcycle	Team	Number	Races	Wins	Podiums	Poles	Pts	Pos.
2014	Superstock 1000	Kawasaki	Team WD-40	#86	12	0	0	0	6	28th

==== 125cc World Championship ====
Season	Class	Motorcycle	Team	Number	Races	Wins	Podiums	Poles	Pts	Pos.
2009	125cc	Aprilia	Veloce Racing	#74	1	0	0	0	0	NC

=== Suzuka 8 Hours ===
Year	Class	Team	Co-riders	Bike	Pos
2026	EWC	(Japan) Honda Suzuka Racing Team	(Japan) Genki Nakajima (Japan) Maiku Watanuki	CBR1000RR-R	TBD
