= March 79B =

Formula racing car

The March 79B is an open-wheel formula racing car, designed, developed and built by March Engineering, for the Formula Atlantic racing series, in 1979. It was powered by a 221 hp (165 kW) 1.6 L (98 cu in) Ford-Cosworth BDD four-cylinder engine.
