= Speedway Miramichi =

Racing venue in Miramichi, New Brunswick

- Coordinates: 47.0390°N 65.5290°W
- Capacity: 2500
- Owner: Jason Carnahan; David Neilson
- Former names: Douglastown Speedway; McKay's Speedway; Williston Speedway; Miramichi Speedway; Miramichi Raceway; Miramichi City Speedway
- Major events: Coors Light Sportsman 125; Demolition events
- Website: http://speedwaymiramichi.ca/Speedway_Miramichi/Speedway_Miramichi.html
- Surface: Asphalt
- Length: 0.31 mi (0.50 km)
- Turns: 4
- Banking: Turn 1–2 10°, Turn 3–4 8°

Speedway Miramichi is a 1/3-mile short track located in Miramichi, New Brunswick. The track originally opened as a dirt track called Douglastown Speedway but was paved in 1968. The track closed a few years after opening in 1974. The track was reopened as Williston Speedway. The track ran races with large crowds for years as the track continued improvements. The track also went through several name changes including McKay's Speedway and Miramichi Speedway. In 1997 the track was sold to Reg Tozer and renamed Miramichi City Speedway. Shortly after, the track started running demolition events instead of stock car racing. The track shut down following the 2009 season. The track sat dormant for two seasons with the exception of one race weekend in September each year. In late 2011, the track was sold to Jason Carnahan and David Neilson. The owners renamed the track Speedway Miramichi and have made continuous improvements to the facility, which is currently running 5–6 races per season. The track once had a well known sportsman race called the Brunswick 100.
