= CASCAR =

Former governing body for stock car racing in Canada

Canadian Association for Stock Car Auto Racing
- Sport: Stock car racing
- Category: Auto racing
- Jurisdiction: Canada
- Abbreviation: CASCAR
- Founded: 1981
- Headquarters: Delaware, Ontario
- President: Anthony Novotny
- Sponsor: General Tire; Budweiser; Castrol
- (Canada)

The Canadian Association for Stock Car Auto Racing (CASCAR) was an auto racing sanctioning body for amateur and professional stock car racing in Canada. The company was founded in 1981 and was headquartered in Delaware, Ontario. In 2006, NASCAR purchased CASCAR and created the NASCAR Canadian Tire Series.

== History ==
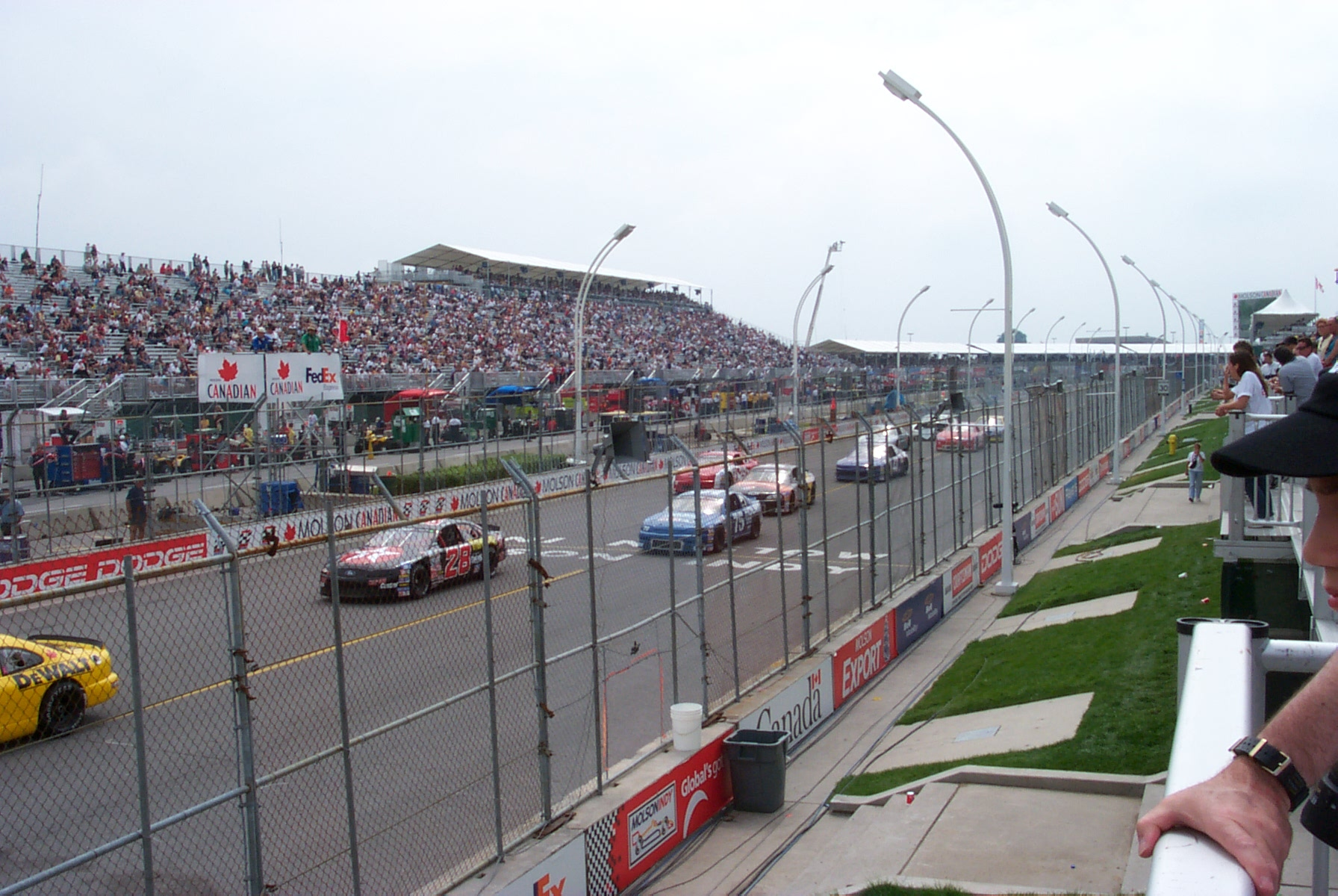
CASCAR Super Series at the Molson Indy Toronto in 2000.

Established in 1981 by President Anthony Novotny, CASCAR boasted the highest level of stock car racing in Canada and sanctioned Canada's only national stock car racing series, the CASCAR Super Series. The sanctioning body also oversaw divisions such as the Hobby Stock and CASCAR West Super Series, the latter of which replaced the Hobby Stock division and ran combination races alongside the national Super Series.

On November 16, 2004, CASCAR announced it had entered a multi-year operational and marketing agreement with NASCAR, after NASCAR had formed NASCAR Canada earlier in the year. This also opened the way for NASCAR's purchase of CASCAR. On September 12, 2006, NASCAR completed its purchase of CASCAR and announced the NASCAR Canadian Tire Series, a series of 10–12 races from May–October 2007. On December 7, 2015, it was announced that Pinty's Delicious Foods Inc. was the new sponsor of the series after Canadian Tire announced on February 17, 2015 that they were not renewing their sponsorship after the 2015 season.

== Automobiles ==
Unlike NASCAR, which mandates the use of steel-bodied shells, CASCAR-approved cars consisted of fiberglass bodyshells covering custom-made tube-frame racing chassis.

However, as in NASCAR, CASCAR cars' engines were normally aspirated, pushrod V8 units producing approximately 500 horsepower (370 kW).

== Race courses ==
CASCAR events were held on short track ovals, permanent road courses, temporary road courses and street courses.

== See also ==
- Canadian Automobile Sport Clubs
- NASCAR (U.S.)
