= Jordan Szoke =

Canadian motorcycle racer

- Nationality: Canadian
- Born: December 30, 1978 (age 47); Lynden, Ontario, Canada
- Bike number: 101
- Website: jordanszoke.com

Jordan Szoke (born December 30, 1978) is a professional superbike racer and 14-time Canadian National Champion from Brantford, Ontario, Canada. Nicknamed "The People's Champ," Szoke is widely considered one of the greatest racers in Canadian history, and holds numerous Canadian Superbike records.

== Racing History ==
Early Years (1994 – 1997)

Szoke first gained his road-racing license in 1994 at the age of 15, and turned pro after just one season of amateur racing. Szoke's first pro season consisted mostly of Regional racing, winning two RACE championships. In 1996, his first full National season as a pro, Szoke won all but one race in the Lightweight GP series and consistently finished inside the top-ten in the Pro 600 category, earning a Pro Superbike ride for the 1997 season.

First Championship and Switch to Honda (1998 – 2000)

Szoke was signed by Kawasaki Canada as a factory rider for the 1998 season, winning twice and finding the podium in all but one race to secure his first Pro Superbike National Championship at just 19 years old. Riding for Honda in 1999, Szoke was unable to defend his title in part due to a crash in round one, but won three races in a row and four in total. Szoke continued his form in 2000, winning four races for the second-consecutive season, but was again unable to capture the title.

U.S. Stint and Return to Canada (2001 – 2005)

Szoke's success in Canada quickly gained attention in the United States, and he was signed by Harley Davidson to race in the AMA series in 2001. Szoke had a consistent season and finished as the top privateer in the AMA Superbike series, but was hamstrung by poor equipment as Harley Davidson withdrew from AMA at the end of the year. Szoke was quickly signed by American Suzuki in the Superstock category for the 2002 season, where he recorded three podiums in five races before his season was cut short due to visa issues. Szoke returned to American Suzuki in 2003 as their official Superbike rider, but again struggled with five mechanical failures and finished tenth in the final standings. Szoke returned to Canada in 2004, reuniting with Honda, but he was unable to regain his form as he won only one race across two seasons for the factory team.

Kawasaki Dominance (2006 – 2011)

Szoke returned to Kawasaki in 2006, winning all but the final two races to capture his second Pro Superbike title. He had a tougher time in 2007 and 2008, but still won five races across two seasons and captured his third and fourth championships. He won three more races in 2008 to secure his fifth career Pro Superbike title, tying Steve Crevier for the most in Canadian history. The 2009 season marked the beginning of his rivalry with teenager Brett McCormick, who won four races to Szoke's three, but Szoke still managed to capture his record-breaking sixth title. After his contract with Kawasaki fell through in 2010, Szoke returned to Honda, winning all seven races to record the first perfect season in CSBK history. Szoke returned to Kawasaki again in 2011, but was unable to match McCormick and the brand-new BMW team as McCormick won all but the final race to end Szoke's run of five-straight championships.

Switch to BMW (2012 – 2018)

After McCormick departed for World Superbike in 2012, Szoke left Kawasaki to replace him at BMW. His first two seasons aboard the S1000RR were just as dominant, winning six races and finding the podium in all 12 races to secure his seventh and eighth Pro Superbike titles. Szoke appeared set to win a ninth championship in 2014, but his season was cut short due to a wrist injury. Szoke returned from injury to record perfect seasons in both 2015 and 2016, winning all 14 races over that span including a pair of victories over former MotoGP rider Claudio Corti at CTMP in 2016. Szoke's perfect run came to an end in 2017, though he still won six of seven races to win his 12th National title. Szoke won the first five races of the 2018 campaign, and despite being held off the podium for the first time in six years, he was able to win his 13th championship and eleventh in a thirteen-year span.

Return to Kawasaki (2019 – present)

Szoke returned to Kawasaki in 2019, but his season was derailed by a pair of high-profile crashes in round one and round four as he finished second to rival Ben Young. After the coronavirus pandemic shortened the 2020 season, Szoke won all four races to win his 14th National championship. Szoke will return to Kawasaki in 2021, his 24th season in Pro Superbike.

== Career results ==
Canadian Superbike Championship

Races: 139

Wins: 76

Podiums: 96

Pole Positions: 59

Championships: 14 (1998, 2002, 2006, 2007, 2008, 2009, 2010, 2012, 2013, 2015, 2016, 2017, 2018, 2020)

American Motorcycle Association

Wins: 0

Podiums: 3

Pole Positions: 1

Championships: 0

FIM World Endurance Championship

Third-place finish at 2002 Suzuka Eight Hours

== Career statistics ==
=== MotoAmerica Superstock Championship ===
==== By year ====
Year	Class	Bike	1	2	3	4	5	6	7	8	9	10	11	Pos	Pts
2004	Superstock	Honda	DAY; 16	FON	INF	BAR	PPK	RAM	BRD	LAG	M-O	RAT	VIR	40th	15

=== AMA Superbike Championship ===
Year	Class	Team	1		2		3		4		5		6		7	8		9		10		11		Pos	Pts
Year	Class	Team	R1	R2	R1	R2	R1	R2	R1	R2	R1	R2	R1	R2	R1	R1	R2	R1	R2	R1	R2	R1	R2	Pos	Pts
2008	SuperBike	Kawasaki	DAY		BAR; 10	BAR; 12	FON	FON	INF	INF	MIL	MIL	RAM	RAM	LAG	OHI	OHI	VIR	VIR	RAT	RAT	LAG		25th	40
2010	SuperBike	Honda	DAY	DAY	FON	FON	RAT	RAT	INF	INF	RAM	RAM	MOH; 10	MOH; Ret	LAG	VIR; 10	VIR; 10	NJE	NJE	BAR	BAR			24th	33
