= Race City Motorsport Park =

Racing facility located in Calgary, Alberta

- Location: Calgary, Alberta
- Coordinates: 50°56′37″N 113°55′54″W
- Opened: 1985; 41 years ago
- Closed: 21 October 2011; 14 years ago
- Major events: Former: Canadian Superbike Championship (1987–2010); Vans Warped Tour (1999–2009); CASCAR Super Series (1993–2001, 2003, 2005); ASA National Tour (1988–1993); Atlantic Championship (1989–1991); NASCAR Northwest Tour (1986–1987)

Road Course (1985–2011)
- Length: 3.219 km (2.000 mi)
- Turns: 11

Short Oval (1985–2011)
- Length: 0.805 km (0.500 mi)
- Banking: 11–15 degrees

Drag Strip (1985–2011)
- Length: 0.402 km (0.250 mi)

Race City Motorsport Park, also known as Race City, was a multi-track auto racing facility located in Calgary, Alberta, Canada. The facility featured a 0.250 mi (0.402 km) dragstrip, a 3.200 km (1.988 mi) 11-turn road course, and a 0.500 mi (0.805 km) paved short oval.

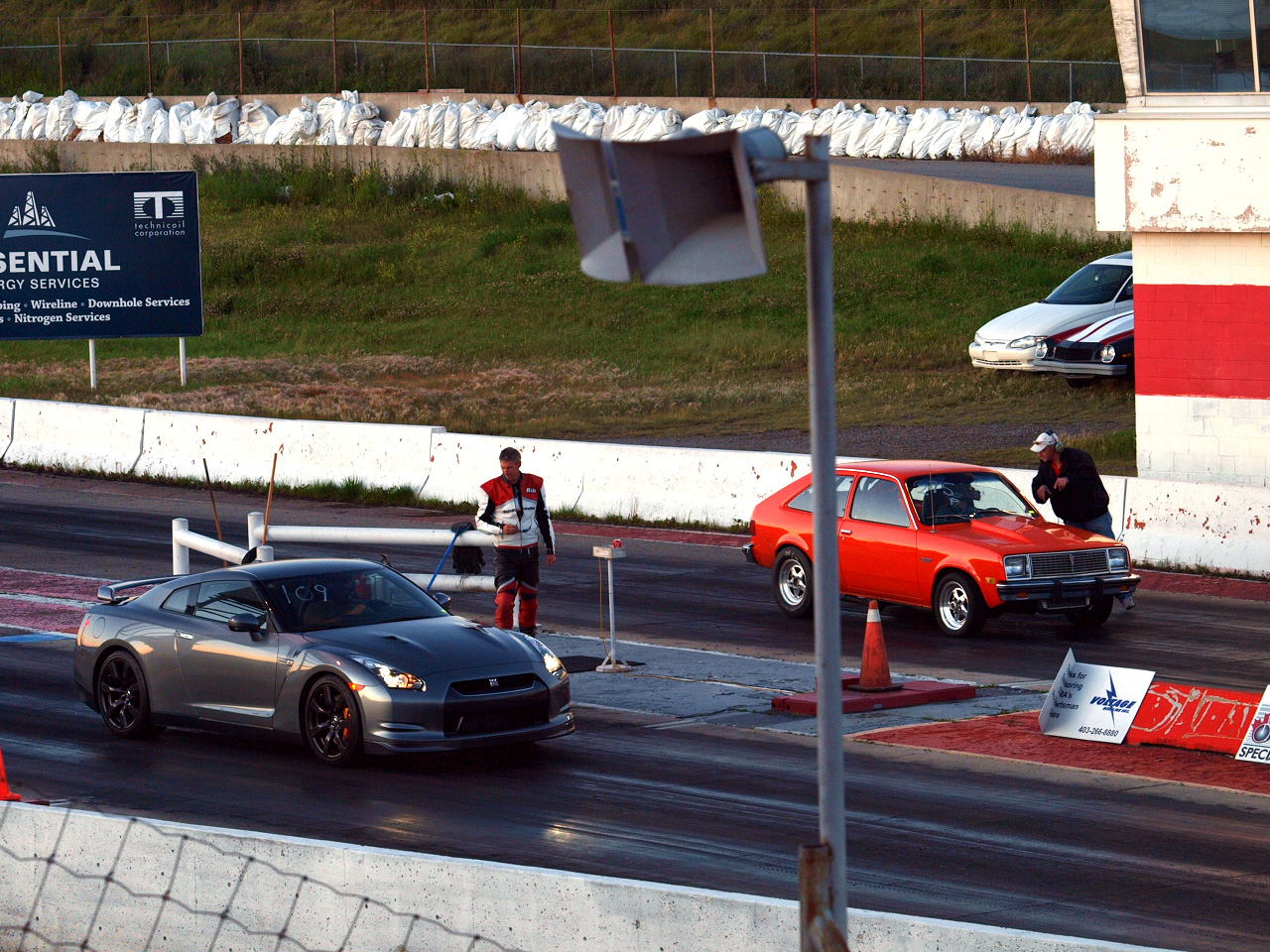
Nissan GTR R35 Versus Chevy Chevette on Drag Strip

The Race City grounds, known as Race City Speedway, was a regular host of Warped Tour, which stopped there 11 times.

Race City was due to close around October 9, 2009. However, on September 28, 2009, Calgary city council voted in favour of extending the lease on Race City until 2015. This decision was later overturned, and the track officially closed on October 21, 2011 due to expansion of the Shepard landfill.

== See also ==
- List of auto racing tracks in Canada
