= Canadian Superbike Championship =

Canadian road racing superbike championship

Bridgestone Canadian Superbike Championship
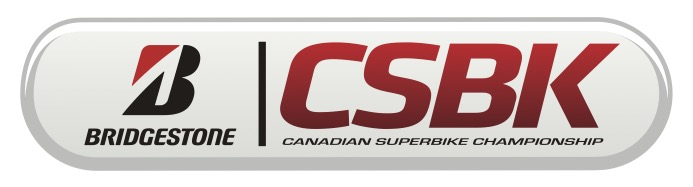
- Category: Superbike racing
- Country: Canada
- Inaugural season: 1980
- Riders' champion: (Canada) (Scotland) Ben Young
- Makes' champion: (Germany) BMW
- Official website: CSBK Canadian Superbike Championship

The Bridgestone Canadian Superbike Championship (CSBK) is the national motorcycle road racing superbike championship in Canada. The series is managed and organized by Professional Motor Sports Productions Inc. (PMP) of Hamilton, Ontario, and owner Ross Millson.

The series features national championships for seven classes, open to professional and amateur motorcycle riders. The headline Pro Superbike category features the best riders from across Canada, with the champion winning the Canada Cup every season.

Bridgestone became the official sponsor and tire supplier of the series in 2023, and will remain in that role through at least the 2026 season.

== History ==
=== Early years (1980–1993) ===
The Canadian Superbike Championship was established in 1980, the first season to feature a multiple-event schedule. This came on the heels of the inaugural national event at Edmonton in 1979, won by George Morin. The 1980 season saw two events in Edmonton and Shannonville, with Morin earning the first-ever national championship and #1 plate in Canada.

A lone event at Edmonton in 1981 meant no official national championship would take place, but a return in 1982 saw Steve Dick claim the second-ever title following races at Shannonville and Atlantic Motorsport Park. The national series would then take a backseat to regional racing for the next three years, as no official national champions were crowned in 1983, 1984, or 1985.

The demand for a national championship re-emerged in 1986, and the RACE Series (then a regional organization) took over management duties. The first full campaign featured five rounds in five different provinces, as Michel Mercier claimed the national championship with a win at the final round in Shannonville.

The next two seasons saw eight different riders win races across 13 events, with Mercier defending his title in 1987 before Rueben McMurter took the championship in 1988. However, the 1988 season brought the debut of Miguel Duhamel and Steve Crevier, who would become the biggest names in Canadian racing over the next two decades.

Both Crevier and Duhamel would trade wins in 1989 with Crevier winning the championship, leaving to race in the United States the following year. That left Duhamel as the favourite for the 1990 title, but Mercier would win four races to secure his third and final crown. Crevier would return to Canada in 1991 and entered a period of dominance for Kawasaki, winning championships in 1991, 1992, and 1993.

=== Start of modern era (1994–2005) ===
The mid-1990's brought more success for Kawasaki but with multiple riders, as Michael Taylor and Don Munroe traded championships for the Japanese brand. Taylor would win in 1994 and 1996, while Munroe was victorious in 1995 and 1997. The duo was beat in 1998 by fellow Kawasaki rider Jordan Szoke, the first rookie champion in CSBK history and at the time the youngest winner at only 19 years old.

Despite being the overwhelming favourite in 1999, Jordan Szoke switched to Honda and struggled in the opening rounds, eventually losing the championship to Francis Martin. The 2000 season saw the return once again of Crevier to CSBK, who would win his fifth career title despite an improved year from Szoke. Crevier would defend his title in 2001, becoming a six-time national champion.

A switch to Suzuki in 2002 would prove to be a wise decision for Szoke, who won five races and secured his second national title, four years after winning as a teenager. That would lead him to the United States in 2003, with Pascal Picotte returning to Canada to replace him on a lucrative deal for Suzuki. Picotte would dominate the next two years of CSBK, winning championships in 2003 and 2004. Injuries would limit him in 2005, however, while Szoke only raced select events north of the border, leaving Francis Martin to claim his second national crown that season.

=== Szoke dominance (2006–2018) ===
Jordan Szoke would return to Kawasaki in 2006 after winning his first title with the brand in 1998. He would quickly become the feature name of the series, winning the first six races of the season in 2006 to capture the overall title. Crevier's latest return to CSBK nearly resulted in a seventh championship, but Szoke would hang on to defend his crown in 2007 and 2008.

The 2009 season featured the start of one of the most iconic rivalries in series history as teenager Brett McCormick won four races for Suzuki, but a crash at Canadian Tire Motorsport Park was enough to hand Szoke his fourth consecutive championship and tie Crevier with six all-time. Szoke would run a privateer Honda effort in 2010, winning every race to record the perfect season and win his seventh crown.

The 2011 season saw Szoke return to Kawasaki while McCormick piloted an all-new BMW Motorrad program. It proved to be an excellent match for McCormick and the S1000RR, as he won the first six races of the year to end Szoke's run of five consecutive championships. However, McCormick would move to World Superbike the following year, allowing Szoke to move to BMW in his place and repeat as champion in 2012 and 2013.

It appeared as though Szoke would add a tenth championship in 2014, but a mid-season injury handed the title to Jodi Christie and Honda. Szoke would add perfect seasons in 2015 and 2016, and won all but one race in 2017 to become a 12-time national champion. The 2018 season began the same way with five consecutive victories, enough to help secure Szoke a 13th championship, but rival Ben Young would end his win streak at the final round.

=== Modern era (2019–present) ===
The end of 2018 forced Jordan Szoke to return to Kawasaki after eight years away from the brand, while Ben Young took over as the lead rider for BMW Motorrad. The switch worked well for both Young and BMW, winning the opening two races and adding a historic comeback victory at Atlantic Motorsport Park to win his first national championship.

The COVID-19 pandemic meant only an abbreviated two-round schedule could take place in 2020, as Young decided not to defend his crown. That left Szoke to another perfect campaign, winning his 14th and most recent championship. Young would return in 2021 but lost to series debutant Alex Dumas, who became the first rookie champion since Szoke while also winning the title at just 19 years old for Suzuki.

Young would steal the championship back in 2022, narrowly defeating Dumas in one of the closest championship battles in series history. In 2023, the series partnered with Bridgestone to become the official sponsor and spec tire of the series through at least 2026. Young would add a third championship in the first year under Bridgestone, completing the title comeback after Dumas led for majority of the season.

Prior to the 2023 season, PMP founder and longtime CSBK president Colin Fraser sold the organization and series to former pro racer Ross Millson.

== 2024 CSBK Schedule ==
Track	City	Province	Length	Turns	Debut Year
Shannonville Motorsport Park	Shannonville	Ontario	2.47 km (Pro Track)	9 (Pro)	1980
Grand Bend Motorplex	Grand Bend	Ontario	2.2 km	11	2017
RAD Torque Raceway	Edmonton	Alberta	2.7 km	14	2015
Atlantic Motorsport Park	Shubenacadie	Nova Scotia	2.56 km	11	1982
Canadian Tire Motorsport Park	Bowmanville	Ontario	3.957 km	10	1985
Shannonville Motorsport Park	Shannonville	Ontario	4.03 km (Long Track)	15 (Long)	1980

== CSBK Former Tracks ==
Track	City	Province	Length	Turns	Years
Alma Street Circuit	Alma	Quebec			1993–1995
Autodrome St. Eustache	Saint-Eustache	Quebec	1.78 km	15	2002–2003, 2011–2019
Calabogie Motorsports Park	Greater Madawaska	Ontario	5.05 km	20	2008–2009, 2015, 2020–2022
Castrol Raceway	Edmonton	Alberta	2.7 km	14	2015
Circuit ICAR	Mirabel	Quebec	2.8 km	10	2009–2011
Circuit Mont-Tremblant	Mont-Tremblant	Quebec	4.26 km	17	2003–2004, 2006–2007, 2012–2013
Circuit Sanair	Saint-Pie	Quebec	2.0 km		
Edmonton International Speedway	Edmonton	Alberta	4.067 km	14	
Gimli Motorsports Park	Gimli	Manitoba	2.092 km	9	1985–1988
Namao Airport	Edmonton	Alberta			2001
Race City Motorsport Park	Calgary	Alberta	3.2 km	11	1987–2010
Westwood Motorsport Park	Coquitlam	British Columbia	2.9 km	8	1985–1990

== CSBK Superbike Champions ==
Canadian Superbike (CSBK) Riders' Champions
Season	Class	Rider	Bike
1980	Pro Superbike	(Canada) George Morin	(Japan) Kawasaki KZ1000
1981	Pro Superbike	(Canada) Lang Hindle	(Japan) Kawasaki KZ1000
1982	Pro Superbike	(Canada) Miles Baldwin	(Japan) Yamaha TZ750
1983	Pro Superbike	(Canada) Art Robbins	(Japan) Suzuki GS1000
1984	Pro Superbike	(Canada) Paul MacMillan	(Japan) Suzuki Katana 1100
1985	Pro Superbike	(Canada) Art Robbins	(Japan) Yamaha TZ750
1986	Pro Superbike	(Canada) Michel Mercier	(Japan) Suzuki GSX-R750
1986	Pro Sport Bike	(Canada) Mario Duhamel	(Japan) Suzuki RG500
1987	Pro Superbike	(Canada) Michel Mercier	(Japan) Suzuki GSX-R750
1987	Pro Sport Bike	(Canada) Mario Duhamel	(Japan) Honda 600
1988	Pro Superbike	(Canada) Rueben McMurter	(Japan) Honda VFR750
1988	Pro Sport Bike	(Canada) Gary Goodfellow	(Japan) Honda 600
1989	Pro Superbike	(Canada) Steve Crevier	(Japan) Yamaha OWO1
1989	Pro Sport Bike	(Canada) Steve Crevier	(Japan) Yamaha YZF-R6
1990	Pro Superbike	(Canada) Michel Mercier	(Japan) Yamaha OWO1
1990	Pro Sport Bike	(Canada) Denis Royer	(Japan) Yamaha YZR600
1991	Pro Superbike	(Canada) Steve Crevier	(Japan) Kawasaki ZX-7R
1991	Pro Sport Bike	(Canada) Linnley Clarke	(Japan) Yamaha YZR600
1992	Pro Superbike	(Canada) Steve Crevier	(Japan) Kawasaki ZX-7R
1992	Pro Sport Bike	(Canada) Linnley Clarke	(Japan) Yamaha YZR600
1993	Pro Superbike	(Canada) Steve Crevier	(Japan) Kawasaki ZX-7R
1993	Pro Sport Bike	(Canada) Steve Crevier	(Japan) Kawasaki ZX-6R
1994	Pro Superbike	(Canada) Michael Taylor	(Japan) Kawasaki ZX-7R
1994	Pro Sport Bike	(Canada) Don Munroe	(Japan) Kawasaki ZX-6R
1995	Pro Superbike	(Canada) Don Munroe	(Japan) Kawasaki ZX-7R
1995	Pro Sport Bike	(Canada) Don Munroe	(Japan) Kawasaki ZX-6R
1996	Pro Superbike	(Canada) Michael Taylor	(Japan) Kawasaki ZX-7RR
1996	Pro Sport Bike	(Canada) Don Munroe	(Japan) Kawasaki ZX-6R
1997	Pro Superbike	(Canada) Don Munroe	(Japan) Kawasaki ZX-7RR
1997	Pro Sport Bike	(Canada) Don Munroe	(Japan) Kawasaki ZX-6R
1998	Pro Superbike	(Canada) Jordan Szoke	(Japan) Kawasaki ZX-7RR
1998	Pro Rookie	(Canada) Frank Trombino	
1998	Pro Sport Bike	(Canada) Don Munroe	(Japan) Kawasaki ZX-6R
1999	Pro Superbike	(Canada) Francis Martin	(Japan) Kawasaki ZX-7RR
1999	Pro Sport Bike	(Canada) Linnley Clarke	(Japan) Yamaha YZF-R6
2000	Pro Superbike	(Canada) Steve Crevier	(Japan) Honda RC51
2000	Pro Sport Bike	(Canada) Owen Weichel	(Japan) Kawasaki ZX-6R
2001	Pro Superbike	(Canada) Steve Crevier	(Japan) Honda RC51
2001	Pro Rookie	(Canada) Andrew Nelson	
2001	Open Sport Bike	(Canada) Frank Trombino	(Japan) Yamaha YZF-R1
2001	Pro Sport Bike	(Canada) Steve Crevier	(Japan) Honda CBR600F4i
2002	Pro Superbike	(Canada) Jordan Szoke	(Japan) Suzuki GSX-R1000
2002	Pro Rookie	(Canada) Chris Peris	(Japan) Honda CBR600F4i
2002	Open Sport Bike	(Canada) Francis Martin	(Japan) Suzuki GSX-R1000
2002	Pro Sport Bike	(Canada) Clint McBain	(Japan) Suzuki GSX-R600
2003	Pro Superbike	(Canada) Pascal Picotte	(Japan) Yamaha YZF-R1
2003	Pro Rookie	(Canada) Matt Binns	(Japan) Yamaha YZF-R6
2003	Pro Sport Bike	(Canada) Pascal Picotte	(Japan) Yamaha YZF-R6
2003	AM Sport Bike	(Canada) Jeremy Leduc	(Japan) Yamaha YZF-R6
2004	Pro Superbike	(Canada) Pascal Picotte	(Japan) Yamaha YZF-R1
2004	Pro Rookie	(Canada) Hugo Brisson	(Japan) Kawasaki ZX-10R (Japan) Kawasaki ZX-6R
2004	Pro Sport Bike	(Canada) Pascal Picotte	(Japan) Yamaha YZF-R6
2004	AM Sport Bike	(Canada) Dominic Lavoie	(Japan) Kawasaki ZX-6R
2005	Pro Superbike	(Canada) Francis Martin	(Japan) Suzuki GSX-R1000
2005	Pro Rookie	(Canada) Erik Beausejour	(Japan) Honda CBR600RR
2005	Pro Sport Bike	(Canada) Steve Crevier	(Japan) Honda CBR600RR
2005	AM Sport Bike	(Canada) Mark Douglas	(Japan) Yamaha R6
2005	Thunder	(Canada) Darren James	(United States) Buell XB9R
2005	Suzuki SV650	(Canada) Karl Daigle	(Japan) Suzuki SV650
2006	Pro Superbike	(Canada) Jordan Szoke	(Japan) Kawasaki ZX-10R
2006	Pro Rookie	(Canada) Stephane Chabot	(Japan) Yamaha YZF-R6
2006	Pro Sport Bike	(Canada) Jordan Szoke	(Japan) Kawasaki ZX-6R
2006	AM Sport Bike	(Canada) Karl Daigle	(Japan) Honda CBR600RR
2006	Thunder	(Canada) Darren James	(United States) Buell XB9R
2006	Suzuki SV650	(Canada) Dave Bagshaw	(Japan) Suzuki SV650
2007	Pro Superbike	(Canada) Jordan Szoke	(Japan) Kawasaki ZX-10R
2007	Pro Rookie	(Canada) Brett McCormick	(Japan) Kawasaki ZX-10R (Japan) Kawasaki ZX-6R
2007	Pro Sport Bike	(Canada) Jordan Szoke	(Japan) Kawasaki ZX-6R
2007	AM Sport Bike	(Canada) Paul Glenn	(Japan) Suzuki GSX-R600
2007	Thunder	(Canada) Michael Taylor	(Germany) BMW R1200S
2007	Suzuki SV650	(Canada) Martin Grande	(Japan) Suzuki SV650
2008	Pro Superbike	(Canada) Jordan Szoke	(Japan) Kawasaki ZX-10R
2008	Pro Rookie	(Canada) Alex Welsh	(United Kingdom) Triumph Daytona 675
2008	Pro Sport Bike	(Canada) Jordan Szoke	(Japan) Kawasaki ZX-6R
2008	AM Sport Bike	(Canada) Jodi Christie	(Japan) Yamaha R6
2008	Thunder	(Canada) Valter Bartolini	(Italy) Ducati 848
2008	Sport Twins	(Canada) Jim Proulx	(United States) Buell XB12R
2008	Suzuki SV650	(Canada) Cody Matechuk	(Japan) Suzuki SV650
2008	Honda CBR125R	(Canada) Raphael Archambault	(Japan) Honda CBR125R
2009	Pro Superbike	(Canada) Jordan Szoke	(Japan) Kawasaki ZX-10R
2009	Pro Rookie	(Canada) Jodi Christie	(Japan) Honda CBR600RR
2009	Pro Sport Bike	(Canada) Jordan Szoke	(Japan) Kawasaki ZX-6R
2009	AM Sport Bike	(Canada) Cody Matechuk	(Japan) Suzuki GSX-R600
2009	Suzuki SV650	(Canada) Raphael Archambault	(Japan) Suzuki SV650
2009	Honda CBR125R	(Canada) Steven Nickerson	(Japan) Honda CBR125R
2010	Pro Superbike	(Canada) Jordan Szoke	(Japan) Honda CBR1000RR
2010	Pro Rookie	(Canada) Cody Matechuk	(Japan) Suzuki GSX-R600
2010	Pro Sport Bike	(Canada) Jordan Szoke	(Japan) Honda CBR600RR
2010	AM Sport Bike	(Canada) Raphael Archambault	(Japan) Honda CBR600RR
2010	Sport Twins	(Canada) Robert Busby	(United States) Buell XB12R
2010	Honda CBR125R	(Canada) Ryan Appenrodt	(Japan) Honda CBR125R
2011	Pro Superbike	(Canada) Brett McCormick	(Germany) BMW S1000RR
2011	Pro Rookie	(Canada) Bodhi Edie	(Japan) Honda CBR600RR
2011	Pro Sport Bike	(Canada) Jodi Christie	(Japan) Honda CBR600RR
2011	AM Superbike	(Canada) Jody Greening	(Japan) Honda CBR1000RR (Japan) Yamaha YZF-R1
2011	AM Sport Bike	(Canada) Kristopher Garvie	(Japan) Kawasaki ZX-6R
2011	H-D XR1200	(Canada) Steve Crevier	(United States) Harley-Davidson XR1200
2011	Honda CBR125R	(Canada) Stacey Nesbitt	(Japan) Honda CBR125R
2012	Pro Superbike	(Canada) Jordan Szoke	(Germany) BMW S1000RR
2012	Pro Rookie	(Canada) Sebastien Tremblay	(Germany) BMW S1000RR
2012	Pro Sport Bike	(Canada) Jodi Christie	(Japan) Honda CBR600RR
2012	AM Superbike	(Canada) Trevor Daley	(Japan) Suzuki GSX-R1000 (Japan) Honda CBR600RR
2012	AM Sport Bike	(Canada) Philippe Masse	(Japan) Kawasaki ZX-6R
2012	H-D XR1200	(Canada) Steve Crevier	(United States) Harley-Davidson XR1200
2012	Honda CBR250R	(Canada) (United Kingdom) (Republic of Ireland) Stacey Nesbitt	(Japan) Honda CBR250R
2013	Pro Superbike	(Canada) Jordan Szoke	(Germany) BMW S1000RR
2013	Pro Rookie	(Canada) Kristopher Garvie	(Japan) Honda CBR1000RR
2013	Pro Sport Bike	(Canada) Jodi Christie	(Japan) Honda CBR600RR
2013	AM Superbike	(Canada) Mitch Card	(Japan) Honda CBR600RR (Japan) Honda CBR1000RR
2013	AM Sport Bike	(Canada) Mitch Card	(Japan) Honda CBR600RR
2013	H-D XR1200	(Canada) Steve Crevier	(United States) Harley-Davidson XR1200
2013	Honda CBR250R	(Canada) Tomas Casas	(Japan) Honda CBR250R
2014	Pro Superbike	(Canada) Jodi Christie	(Japan) Honda CBR1000RR
2014	Pro Rookie	(Canada) Marco Sousa	(Germany) BMW S1000RR
2014	Pro Sport Bike	(Canada) Kenny Riedmann	(United Kingdom) Triumph Daytona 675
2014	AM Superbike	(Canada) Pedro Sousa	(Japan) Honda CBR1000RR
2014	AM Sport Bike	(Canada) Tomas Casas	(Japan) Yamaha R6
2014	Honda CBR250R	(Canada) Jacob Shaw-O'Leary	(Japan) Honda CBR250R
2015	Pro Superbike	(Canada) Jordan Szoke	(Germany) BMW S1000RR
2015	Pro Rookie (tied)	(Canada) Stacey Nesbitt / (Canada) Tomas Casas	(Japan) Honda CBR600RR (Japan) Yamaha R6
2015	Pro Sport Bike	(Canada) Kenny Riedmann	(United Kingdom) Triumph Daytona 675
2015	AM Superbike	(Canada) Derrick Whyte	(Japan) Kawasaki ZX-10R
2015	AM Sport Bike	(Canada) Alex Coelho	(Japan) Kawasaki ZX-6R
2016	Pro Superbike	(Canada) Jordan Szoke	(Germany) BMW S1000RR
2016	Pro Rookie	(Canada) (Scotland) Ben Young	(Germany) BMW S1000RR
2016	Pro Sport Bike	(Canada) Kenny Riedmann	(Japan) Kawasaki ZX-6R
2016	AM Superbike	(Canada) Jean-Marc Bilger	(Germany) BMW S1000RR
2016	AM Sport Bike	(Canada) Chris Brent	(Japan) Honda CBR600RR
2016	Kawasaki Ninja 300	(Canada) Brandon Pemberton	(Japan) Kawasaki Ninja 300
2017	Pro Superbike	(Canada) Jordan Szoke	(Germany) BMW S1000RR
2017	Pro Rookie	(Canada) Jean-Marc Bilger	(Japan) Kawasaki ZX-10R
2017	Pro Sport Bike	(Canada) Tomas Casas	(Japan) Yamaha R6
2017	AM Superbike	(Canada) Samuel Desmarais	(Japan) Kawasaki ZX-6R
2017	AM Sport Bike	(Canada) Jean-Francois Aubin	(Japan) Suzuki GSX-R600
2017	Kawasaki Ninja 300	(Canada) Xavier Paradis	(Japan) Kawasaki Ninja 300
2018	Pro Superbike	(Canada) Jordan Szoke	(Germany) BMW S1000RR
2018	Pro Rookie	(Canada) Samuel Desmarais	(Japan) Kawasaki ZX-6R
2018	Pro Sport Bike	(Canada) Tomas Casas	(Japan) Yamaha R6
2018	AM Superbike	(Canada) Luc Labranche	(Germany) BMW S1000RR
2018	AM Sport Bike	(Canada) Luc Labranche	(Japan) Yamaha YZF-R6
2018	Amateur Lightweight Sport Bike	(Canada) Cameron Walker	(Japan) Kawasaki Ninja 400
2019	Pro Superbike	(Canada) (Scotland) Ben Young	(Germany) BMW S1000RR
2019	Pro Rookie	(Canada) Nicolas Meunier	(Japan) Kawasaki ZX-6R
2019	Pro Sport Bike	(Canada) Will Hornblower	(Japan) Yamaha R6
2019	AM Superbike	(Canada) Guillaume Fortin	(Japan) Kawasaki ZX-10R
2019	AM Sport Bike	(Canada) Christian Allard	(Japan) Kawasaki ZX-6R
2019	Amateur Lightweight Sport Bike	(Canada) Ben LeClair	(Japan) Yamaha YZF-R3
2020	Pro Superbike	(Canada) Jordan Szoke	(Japan) Kawasaki ZX-10R
2021	Pro Superbike	(Canada) Alex Dumas	(Japan) Suzuki GSX-R1000
2021	Pro Rookie	(Canada) Alex Dumas	(Japan) Suzuki GSX-R1000
2021	Pro Sport Bike	(Canada) Sebastien Tremblay	(Japan) Kawasaki ZX-6R
2021	Amateur Superbike	(Canada) Anthony Bergeron	(Germany) BMW S1000RR
2021	Amateur Sport Bike	(Canada) Brad MacRae	(Japan) Yamaha YZF-R6
2021	Amateur Lightweight Sport Bike	(Canada) Harvey Renaud	(Japan) Kawasaki Ninja 400
2022	Pro Superbike	(Canada) (Scotland) Ben Young	(Germany) BMW S1000RR
2022	Pro Rookie	(Canada) Anthony Bergeron	(Germany) BMW S1000RR
2022	Pro Sport Bike	(Canada) Trevor Dion	(Japan) Kawasaki ZX-6R
2022	Amateur Superbike	(Canada) Julien Lafortune	(Japan) Kawasaki ZX-10R
2022	Amateur Sport Bike	(Canada) Paul-Etienne Courtois	(Japan) Kawasaki ZX-6R
2022	Amateur Lightweight Sport Bike	(Canada) Bryce DeBoer	(Japan) Kawasaki Ninja 400
2022	Pro-Am Lightweight	(Canada) Jared Walker (Pro) (Canada) Bryce DeBoer (Amateur)	(Japan) Kawasaki Ninja 400
2023	Pro Superbike	(Canada) (Scotland) Ben Young	(Germany) BMW S1000RR
2023	Pro Rookie	(Canada) Trevor Dion	(Japan) Kawasaki ZX-10 (Italy) Ducati Panigale V4
2023	Pro Sport Bike	(Canada) David McKay	(Japan) Kawasaki ZX-6R
2023	Pro Twins	(Canada) Andrew Van Winkle	(Japan) Suzuki SV650
2023	Amateur Superbike	(Canada) Maverick Cyr	(United Kingdom) Triumph Daytona 675 (Japan) Kawasaki ZX-10
2023	Amateur Sport Bike	(Canada) Maverick Cyr	(United Kingdom) Triumph Daytona 675
2023	Amateur Lightweight Sport Bike	(Canada) Vincent Lalande	(Japan) Kawasaki Ninja 400
2023	Pro-Am Lightweight	(Canada) Stacey Nesbitt (Pro) (Canada) Vincent Wilson (Amateur)	(Japan) Kawasaki Ninja 400

== See also ==
- Superbike World Championship
- AMA Superbike Championship
- British Superbike Championship
- All Japan Road Race Championship
