= March 76B =

The March 76B is an open-wheel formula racing car, designed, developed and built by March Engineering, for Formula Atlantic racing, in 1976. Gilles Villeneuve won the 1976 CASC Formula Atlantic Players Championship Series outright, winning 4 out of the 6 races that season. March cars dominated that season, taking all the race victories, clinching all the pole positions, and scoring all the fastest race laps. The car's chassis design was a monocoque, and was constructed out of aluminum. It was powered by a 1.6 L (98 cu in) Ford-Cosworth BDA four-cylinder engine, which droves the rear wheels through a 5-speed Hewland F.T.-200 manual gearbox. Ian Scheckter also notably won the 1976 South African Formula Atlantic Championship driving this car, scoring 7 race wins that season.
