= Superbike racing =

Motorcycle racing with highly modified production motorcycles

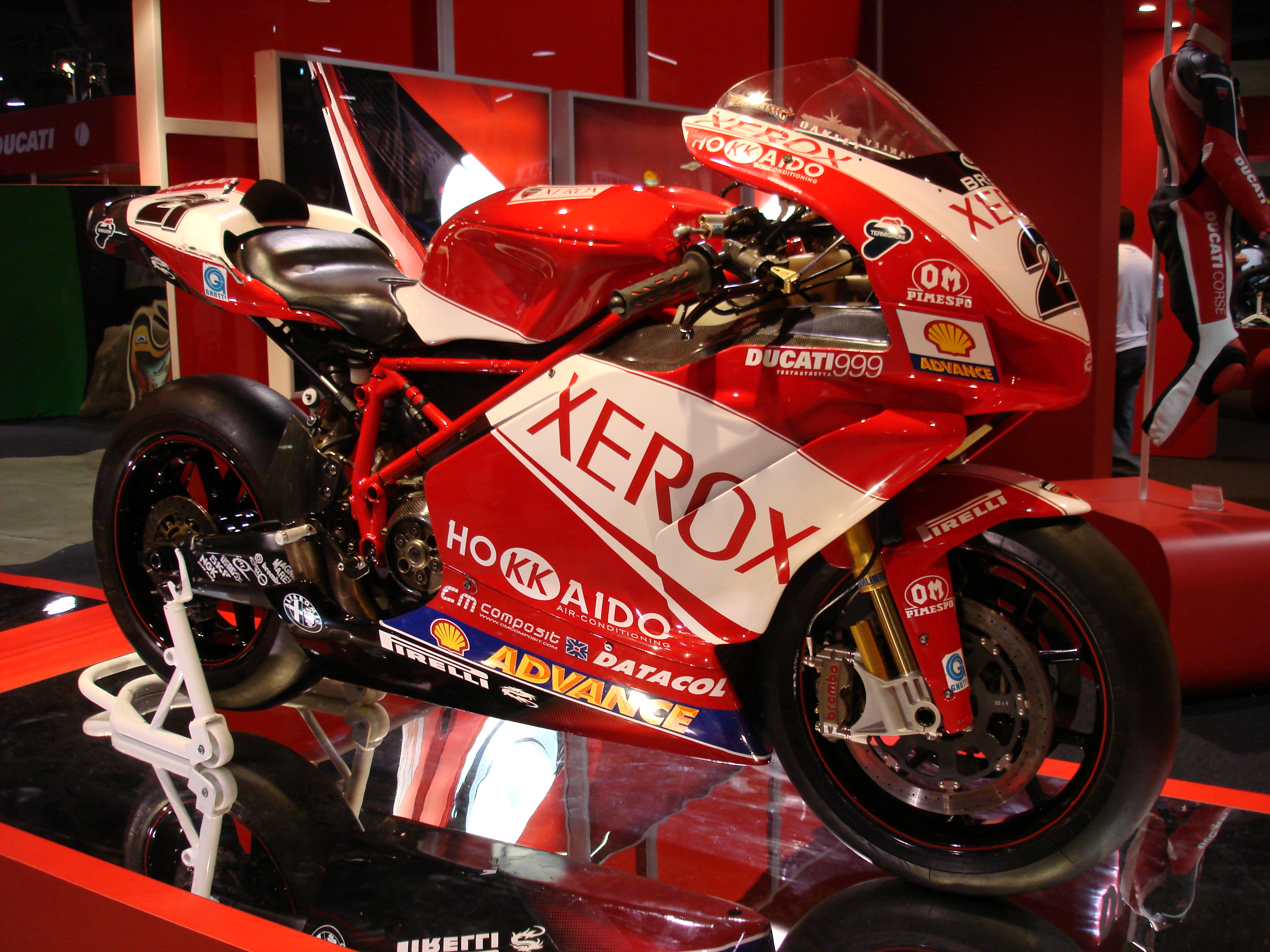

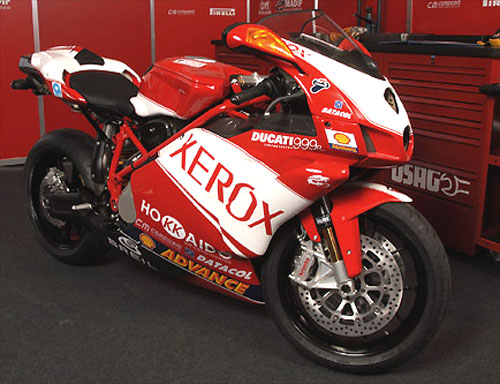
(top picture) Racing version of the Ducati 999.
(bottom picture) Road version of the Ducati 999 in racing livery.
Superbikes must look like their roadgoing counterparts, the most notable difference is the missing headlights and rear view mirrors

Superbike racing is a category of motorcycle racing that employs highly modified production motorcycles, as opposed to MotoGP in which purpose-built motorcycles are used. The Superbike World Championship is the official world championship series since 1988 when the FIM formalized the regulations, though national Superbike championships are held in many countries, including the United Kingdom, the United States, Japan, Australia and Canada. Superbike racing is generally popular with manufacturers, since it helps promote and sell their product, as captured by the slogan "Win on Sunday; Sell on Monday".

== Characteristics of superbike racing motorcycles ==
Superbike racing motorcycles are derived from standard production models, so for a bike to be eligible, the manufacturer must first homologate the model and manufacture the required number of roadgoing machines. While rules vary from series to series, in general the motorcycles must maintain the same profile as their roadgoing counterparts, with the same overall appearance as seen from the front, rear and sides. In addition, the frame cannot be modified. Teams may modify some elements of the bike, including the suspensions, brakes, swingarm, and the diameter and size of the wheels.

Superbike racing motorcycles must have four-stroke engines of between 850 cc and 1200 cc for twins, and between 750 cc and 1000 cc for four cylinder machines.

The restriction to production models distinguishes Superbike racing from MotoGP racing, which uses prototype machines that bear little resemblance to production machines. This is somewhat similar to the distinction in car racing between sports cars and Formula One cars, though the performance gap between Superbike and MotoGP racing is much smaller.

The world's first 'Superbike' was built by brothers Ross and Ralph Hannan in the mid/late 1970s. First ridden successfully in Australia and overseas, including the Suzuka 8 Hours and the Bol d'Or 24-hour endurance races, by Graeme Crosby who went on to international success and was eventually inducted into the NZ sports "Hall of Fame".

The inspiration came from the MCN Superbike Championship which ran from 1971 to 1982 in Great Britain, but there was no standardized regulation yet for the at the time experimental builds of early 'SuperBikes' and the modern formalized competition era began in 1988 when both the Superbike World Championship and French Superbike Championship had their inaugural seasons under the new ruleset.

== Superbike World Championship ==
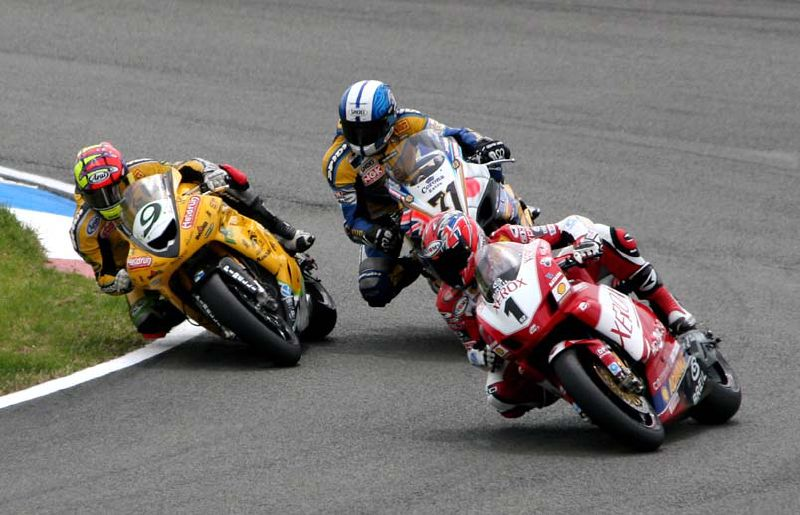
James Toseland (1) on a Ducati leads Chris Walker (9) on a Kawasaki and Yukio Kagayama (71) on a Suzuki during a 2005 Superbike World Championship race

Superbike World Championship (also known as SBK) is the premier international superbike Championship. The championship was founded in 1988. It is regulated by the FIM and managed and promoted by FGSport.

Once poorly compared to the MotoGP championship, the Superbike World Championship has grown into a world-class professional racing series. Many of the riders that competed in SBK over the years are popular by motorcycle racing fans. The most successful rider thus far has been Northern Irelands Jonathan Rea, who won the championship six times (2015, 2016, 2017, 2018, 2019, 2020). Ducati has been the most successful manufacturer in the series over the years, accumulating 15 manufacturer championships. Honda has won it 6 times, with Suzuki claiming one championship. Australia's Troy Bayliss won the 2006 and 2008 titles riding for Xerox Ducati and James Toseland, from the UK, was the winner of the 2007 championship riding for Hannspree Ten Kate Honda.

== Endurance & Time-Trial ==
FIM Endurance World Championship adopted Superbikes early on and equipped them with working lights for nights, making them the primary class at the 24 Heures Moto and the Bol d'Or held in France, and the 24 Hours of Spa in Belgium.

The Isle of Man TT is using Superbike TT since 2005, when it replaced the Formula TT regulations that where still in use after the FIM abandoned the category. The Event is held as a Time Trial with staggered starts.
Other notable events are the North West 200 and Ulster Grand Prix which have followed suit to the Isle of Man TT regulations but use mass starts and are part of the Irish National Road Race Championship.

== National Superbike series ==
National Superbike series vary greatly in challenge and popularity, the most popular being in Britain and North America. Both Japan and Australia have well supported national superbikes series, though they only run for short, 10-race seasons.

=== British Superbike Championship ===
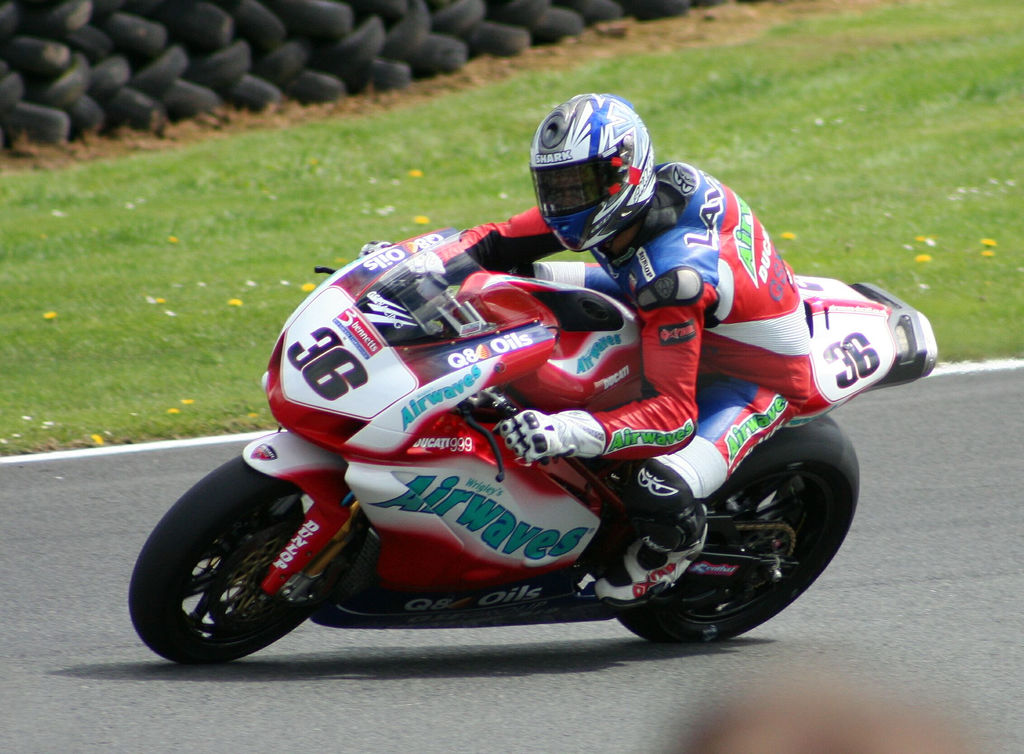
Gregorio Lavilla riding for Airwaves Ducati in the 2005 British Superbike Championship season

The British Superbike championship (known to most as "BSB") is the leading motorcycle racing championship in the United Kingdom. It is managed and organised by MCRCB-Events. The commercial and television rights have been delegated to MotorSport Vision. Manufacturers Ducati, Kawasaki, Suzuki and Yamaha all have well supported teams, while Honda has the only HRC supported superbike team outside Japan. Japanese rider Ryuichi Kiyonari won the 2006, 2007 and 2010 titles riding for HM Plant Honda, when HRC staff was directly involved (after they ended their Castrol WSBK Team after the 2002 title season) until the 2008 season when focus shifted back towards the WorldSBK. Honda Racing UK operates from Louth and periodically receives technical expertise from HRC today for both their BSB and Road Racing Campaign such as the Isle of Man TT.
There was a previously called MCN Superbike Championship that was sponsored by Motor Cycle News that ran from 1971 to 1982 in Great Britain, but that was before the modern Superbike was formalized in 1988. MCN brought the unified Series back in 1996 with the modern Superbike regulations. There have been British Superbike seasons that are recognized from 1988 to 1995 that count towards the BSB Championship, as well as selected events from the Formula TT seasons from 1988 until that world series ceased at the end of 1990 and was delegated to the road races and pulled from the modern circuits in favour of the modern Superbikes.
For the 2000 season the BSB term was presented with following cost-effective measures for the teams bikes and equipment starting in 2002 and an online presence for the Series, which was deemed easier to refer to than BSBK.

=== MotoAmerica Superbike Championship (previously AMA Superbike Championship) ===
Beginning in 2015 the US National Superbike championship moved to a new organization, MotoAmerica, after several years of decline. The new championship is known as the MotoAmerica Superbike Championship, and incorporates classes similar to those operating at world championship level, and other national series, i.e. Superbike, Supersport, Superstock 1000, Superstock and KTM Junior cup.

. The aim of the new championship is to reinvigorate motorcycle road racing in North America and ultimately send its riders to the top-level international championships - MotoGP and World Superbike.

The AMA Superbike was the premier superbike racing series in the United States. It was part of the AMA Pro Racing series, and was managed by the AMA until 2009 when the AMA sold the series to the Daytona MotorSports Group. The series was replaced in 2015 by the MotoAmerica Superbike championship. The AMA ran the Formula Xtreme Regulation for a few years with more open tuning options for the teams alongside the modern Superbike regulation.

=== All Japan Superbike Championship ===
The All Japan Road Race Championship, also known as MFJ Superbike, is the premiere motorcycle road racing championship in Japan and is run by MFJ. The championship started in 1967 and has been running a superbike class since 1994. The series runs a small 7 round schedule but has a large field of Japanese riders and bikes. Atsushi Watanabe won the 2007 championship riding a Yoshimura Suzuki. The big four manufacturers of Japan, Honda, Kawasaki, Suzuki, Yamaha are all heavily involved in the series and field factory backed teams. The Series highlight is the annual Suzuka 8 Hours which is a joint event with the Endurance World Championship.

=== Australian Superbike Championship ===
The Australian Superbike Championship, the premier national Superbike series, is run by Motorcycling Australia. The series runs from February to December and consists of seven rounds per season. Many notable riders have been successful on the world stage, such as Troy Corser, Steve Martin, Rob Phillis, Peter Goddard, Josh Brookes, Troy Bayliss, Anthony Gobert, Matthew Mladin, Aaron Slight, Bryan Staring, Josh Waters, and Mike Jones.
There was a Superbike split in the mid 1990s with two organizers running separate series, one with sponsorship from Shell Oil and aligned with the ATCC in the late 1990s. The Series organized by Australian Road and Track Rider Promotions, introduced the Australian FX-Superbike Championship, and ran the Formula Xtreme regulations for a few years with more open tuning options for the teams alongside the modern Superbike regulation similar to those of the American AMA.

=== Nigeria Superbike Road Race ===
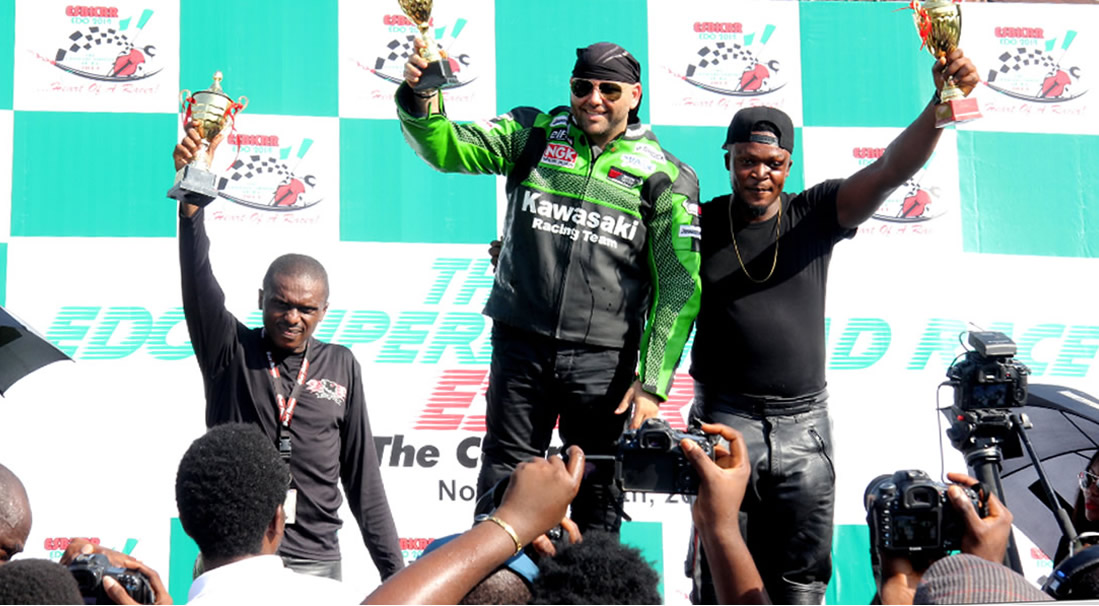
2014 Winner of the Nigeria Superbike Road Race, with the first and Second runners ups

The Nigeria Superbike Road Race, The Bikers Trophy (The BT) is held annually on the last weekend in November, in Edo State, Nigeria. It is the premier motorcycling sports event in Nigeria and West Africa with participants and spectators from all over the World. Modelled after the Isle of Man TT races, The Bikers Trophy (The BT) races take place in a time trial format over a 32 km street circuits which traverse the 8 communities of Urhonigbe, Urohmehe, Umughun, Ogba, Evbonogbon, Ugo, Ekpokor, and Ugbokirima in Orhiomwon Local Government Area of Edo State.

The 2014 event saw podium places go to Jack Affara (Champion), Armstrong Ngugu (2nd Position) and Ikhide Izokpu (3rd Position). Other countries with road races are the Netherlands, Spain, Belgium, Germany, Great Britain, the Czech Republic, Turkey, Ukraine, New Zealand and Macau.

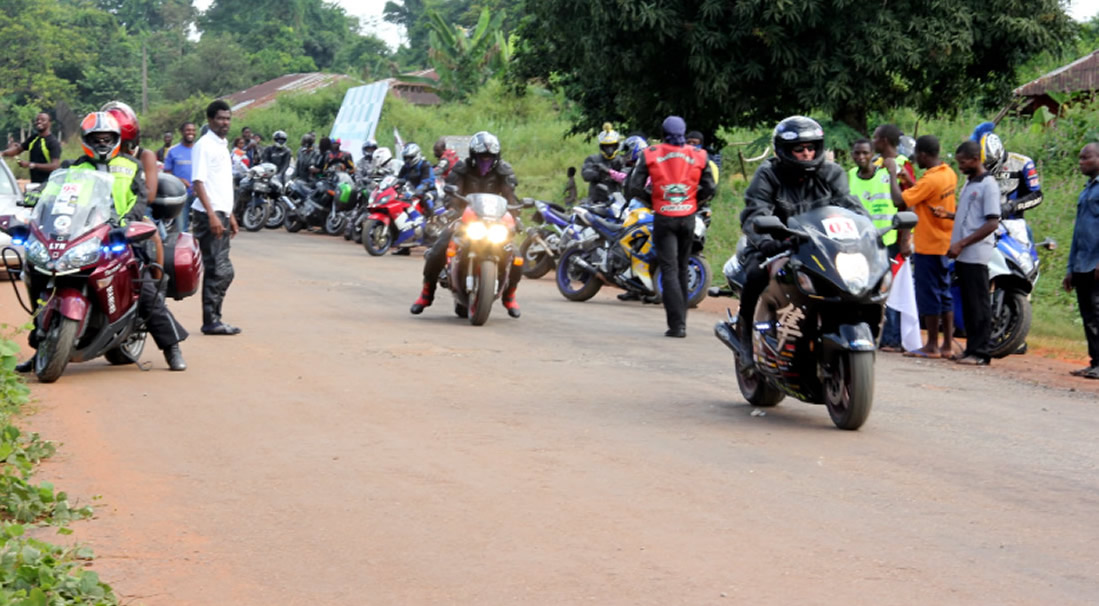
Some of the contestants at the Nigeria Superbike Road Race

== Other Series ==
=== International ===
- International Road Racing Championship (IRRC)

=== Continental ===
Asia

- Asia Road Racing Championship (ARRC)

America
North

- PanAmerican SuperBike Championship (PanAmSBK)

South

- FIM Latin American Superbike Championship (LatAmSBK)

=== Regional ===
Europe
Central

- Alpe Adria Superbike Championship (since 2003)

Eastern

- Balkan Superbike Championship (since 2000, with pauses probably)
- Baltic Superbike Championship (since 2003)

=== National ===
Asia

- China Superbike Championship (CSBK) (Chinese national championship)
- Malaysia Superbike Championship
- Philippines Superbike Championship

Australia

- Australian Road Race Championship
- New Zealand Superbike Championship (NZSBK)
- New Zealand Road Race Championship

Europe
The Italian, German, Spanish and French have a direct lineage to their National Motorcycle Championship and were some of the early Superbike Regulation adopters. Germany took the name from the British before it was formalized by the French in 1988 for the SBK World Championship and their National Series.

- CEV Superbike Championship (CEV) (Spanish national championship) up until 2012 -> FIM CEV International Championship (2013-2016), Spanish Superbike Championship (ESBK) since 2019
- CIV Superbike Championship (CIV) (Italian national championship)
- French Superbike Championship (FSBK) (French national championship) (since 1988)
- IDM Superbike Championship (IDM) (2003-2025) (German national championship) open to international competition, formerly was called the German Superbike Championship (1983-1990) and Pro-Superbike Championship (1991-2001)
- Irish Road Racing Championship (Irish national championship on closed roads)

Central

- Belgian Superbike Championship (1990-1996) revived since 2009
- Dutch Superbike Championship (1990-1997, since 2005)
- International Dutch Championship (IDC) (since 2020)

Eastern

- Czech Superbike Championship (since 1991)
- Slovak Superbike Championship (1993-2002, since 2010)
- Polish Superbike Championship (since 2001)
- Russian Superbike Championship (since 2003)

Western

- Portuguese Superbike Championship (1990-1996) revived since 2011

Northern
Scandinavia

- Danish Superbike Championship (1992-1999, since 2001)
- Finnish Superbike Championship (since 1993)
- Norwegian Superbike Championship (since 1991)
- Swedish Superbike Championship (since 1991)

America
North America

- Canadian Superbike Championship (CSBK) (Canadian national championship) (since 1980)

South America

- Argentinean Superbike Championship
- Moto 1000 GP (Brazilian national championship)
- SuperBike Brasil (Brazilian national championship)

Africa

- South African Superbike Championship (SA-SBK) formerly CitiBike Motorcycle Championship (South African national championship)

=== Continental ===
Asia-Australia

- FIM Pan Pacific Superbike Championship, also called FIM Pan Pacific Road Racing Championship

Europe

- FIM European Superbike Championship (1990-1997) 750cc Limit

=== Regional ===
Europe
Scandinavia

- Nordic Superbike Championship (1990-1995)
- Scandinavian Open Superbike Championship (1996-2014)

=== National ===
Europe

- Austrian Superbike Championship (1991-2019, 2021)
- Swiss Superbike Championship

Asia

- Qatar Superbike Championship

== See also ==
- Outline of motorcycles and motorcycling
- Isle of Man TT
- List of motorsport championships
