= SCCBC =

SCCBC is an abbreviation that may refer to:

- Sports Car Club of British Columbia
- St. Catharine's College Boat Club (Cambridge), a rowing club of St Catharine's College, Cambridge, England
- St Catherine's College Boat Club, a rowing club of St Catherine's College, Oxford, England
- St Chad's College Boat Club, a rowing club of St Chad's College, Durham University, England
