= Mission Raceway Park =

Auto racing facility in Mission, British Columbia

- Map of the track
- Location: 32670 Dyke Road; Mission, British Columbia, Canada V2V 4J5
- Coordinates: 49.125455°N 122.324996°W
- Owner: B.C. Custom Car Association
- Operator: B.C. Custom Car Association
- Opened: March 14th, 1992
- Major events: Lucas Oil NHRA Canadian National Open; Lordco NHRA B.C. Nationals

Road Course
- Length: 2.2 km (1.4 mi)
- Turns: 9

Drag Strip
- Length: 0.4 km (0.25 mi)

Mission Raceway Park, also known as MRP, is an auto racing facility located in Mission, British Columbia, Canada. The facility features a ¼ mile NHRA-sanctioned dragstrip, a 2 km (1.2 mi) 9-turn road course, and a 3 km (2 mi) motocross track. It is owned and operated by the B.C. Custom Car Association, and the BCCCA operates the drag strip directly. The road course and motocross tracks are operated independently by the Sports Car Club of British Columbia (SCCBC) and the Lower Mainland Motocross Club (LMMC) respectively. The road course was renamed in 2022, now known as the Speed-Fanatics Motorsports Circuit.

== Drag strip history ==
The BCCCA originally drag raced on unused runways at Abbotsford Airport from 1952 to 1957. The original Mission Raceway Park opened in 1965, and the facility operated until 1978 (a motocross track was added in 1973). However, MRP was shut down when the District of Mission wanted to establish an industrial park on the site. After years of negotiating and legal wrangling, the new MRP was opened on March 14, 1992, on land near the Fraser River. The drag strip was awarded a National Open by the NHRA in 1993.

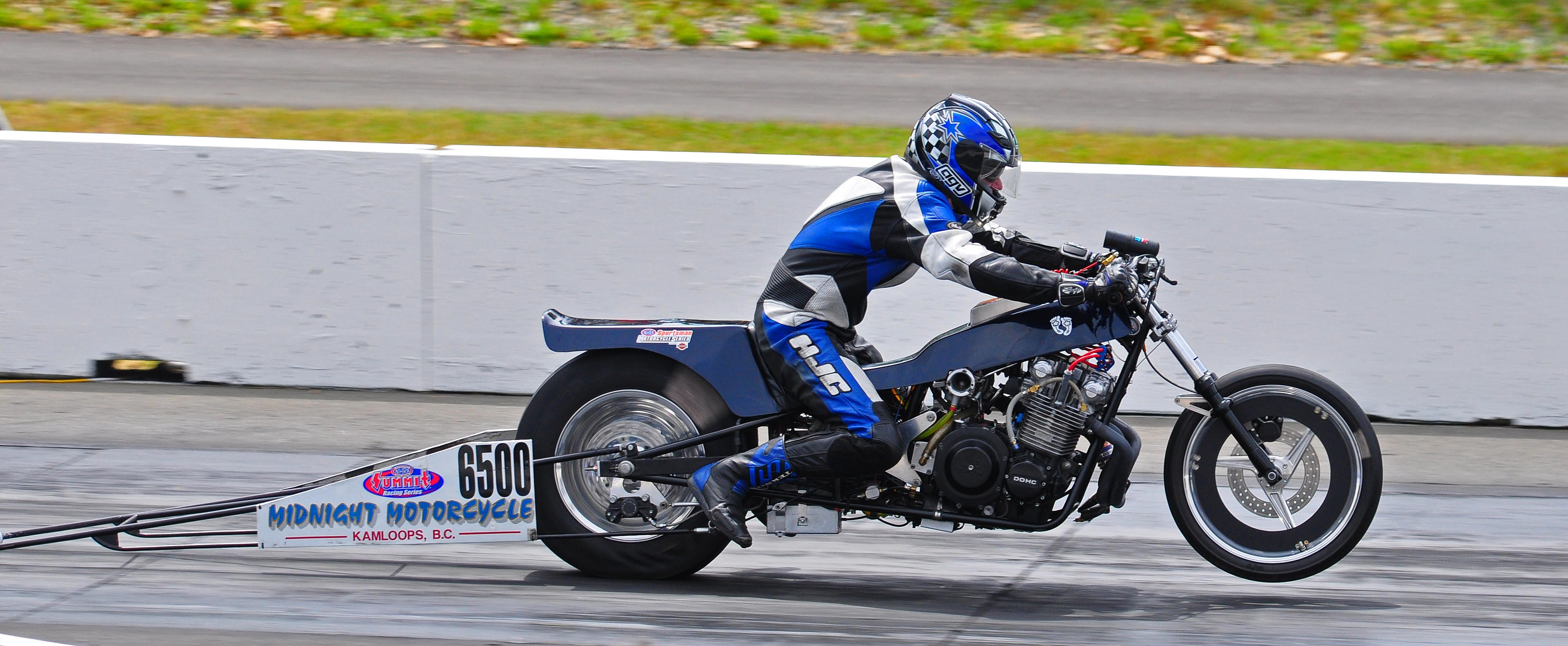
Dragster motorcycle at Mission Raceway in 2010

MRP won the NHRA Division 6 Track Of The Year Award five years in a row, from 1994 to 1998. It then won the same award three years in a row from 2005 to 2007.

== Road course history ==
The SCCBC originally road raced on unused runways at Abbotsford Airport. In 1958, the SCCBC opened the Westwood Racing Circuit, which operated until the club lost their lease in 1990. The SCCBC worked out an arrangement with the BCCCA, and in 1992 opened the River’s Edge Road Course at Mission Raceway Park. The road course was used for driver training classes during the first two years, and began full road racing operations in 1994.

The road course was changed for 2008 with lefthand turn 7 becoming a left-right combination (7A-7B) leading into a new lefthand turn 8 (previously a right) and a longer, wider turn 9. This caused higher exit speed onto the straight, and may have contributed to the trackday death of Suzuki TLR-1000 rider Cam Gillispie, 33, on 12 June 2009 when he struck the outside concrete wall after exiting turn 9. The track was reconfigured for motorcycles in 2010, returning to a lefthand turn 7 followed by a righthand turn 8 leading into the original turn 9 feeding onto the straight. Cars continue to use the new configuration.

The road course was renamed as the Speed-Fanatics Motorsports Circuit in 2022.

== See also ==
- List of auto racing tracks in Canada
