= 1978 Trans-Am Series =

American sports car racing competition

Seasons
- ← 1977 1979 →

The 1978 Trans-Am Series was the thirteenth running of the Sports Car Club of America's premier series. It was the first time the series left North America (i.e. the United States and Canada), with a round in Mexico at the end of the season. All races except for the Six Hours of Watkins Glen ran for approximately one hundred miles.

== Results ==
Round	Date	Circuit	Winning driver (TA2)	Winning vehicle (TA2)	Winning driver (TA1)	Winning vehicle (TA1)
1	May 21	(United States) Sears Point	(United States) Greg Pickett	Chevrolet Corvette	(United States) Gene Bothello	Chevrolet Corvette
2	June 4	(Canada) Westwood	(Canada) Ludwig Heimrath	Porsche 935	(United States) Nick Engels	Chevrolet Corvette
3	June 11	(United States) Portland	(United States) Tuck Thomas	Chevrolet Monza	(United States) Bob Matkowitch	Chevrolet Corvette
4	June 25	(Canada) Mont-Tremblant	(United States) Monte Sheldon	Porsche 935	(United States) Bob Tullius	Jaguar XJS
5	July 8	(United States) Watkins Glen‡	(United States) Hal Shaw, Jr. (United States) Monte Shelton	Porsche 935	(United States) Brian Fuerstenau (United States) Bob Tullius	Jaguar XJS
6	August 13	(United States) Brainerd	(United States) Jerry Hansen	Chevrolet Monza	(United States) Bob Tullius	Jaguar XJS
7	August 19	(Canada) Mosport	(United States) Greg Pickett	Chevrolet Corvette	(United States) Bob Tullius	Jaguar XJS
8	September 4	(United States) Road America	(United States) Greg Pickett	Chevrolet Corvette	(United States) Bob Tullius	Jaguar XJS
9	October 8	(United States) Laguna Seca	(United States) Greg Pickett	Chevrolet Corvette	(United States) Bob Tullius	Jaguar XJS
10	November 5	Mexico City	(Canada) Ludwig Heimrath	Porsche 935	(United States) Bob Tullius	Jaguar XJS

‡ The Watkins Glen 6 Hours was a round of the World Championship for Makes, the overall winner was an FIA Group 5 Porsche 935

== Championships ==
=== Driver ===
==== Category I ====
1. Bob Tullius – 189 points
2. Babe Headley – 98.5 points
3. Frank Joyce – 72 points
4. Brian Fuerstenau – 45 points
5. John Huber – 44.5 points

==== Category II ====
1. Greg Pickett – 132.5 points
2. Tuck Thomas – 114.5 points
3. Ludwig Heimrath – 102 points
4. Hal Shaw, Jr. – 73 points
5. Monte Sheldon – 71 points

=== Manufacturer ===
==== Category I (Over 2.5L) ====
1. Jaguar – 73 points
2. Chevrolet – 69 points
3. Datsun – 3 points

==== Category II (Over 2.5L) ====
1. Chevrolet – 74 points
2. Porsche – 65 points
3. Pontiac – 10 points

==== Combined (Under 2.5L) ====
1. Porsche – 72 points
2. Datsun – 19 points
3. British Leyland – 18 points
4. Mazda – 18 points
5. Opel – 12 points
