= 1977 Trans-Am Series =

American sports car racing competition

Seasons
- ← 1976 1978 →

The 1977 Trans-Am Series was the twelfth running of the Sports Car Club of America's premier series. Porsche swept the season. All races except for the Six Hours of Watkins Glen ran for approximately one hundred miles. With the revival of the Can Am Series that year, 1977 also began a resurgence of interest in SCCA events. Trans Am would contribute with a slight resurgence in the eighties.

== Results ==
Round	Date	Circuit	Winning driver (TA2)	Winning vehicle (TA2)	Winning driver (TA1)	Winning vehicle (TA1)
1	May 30	Seattle	(Canada) Ludwig Heimrath	Porsche 934	(United States) Bob Tullius	Jaguar XJS
2	June 5	Westwood	(United States) Peter Gregg	Porsche 934	(United States) Bob Tullius	Jaguar XJS
3	June 12	Portland	(United States) George Follmer	Porsche 934	(United States) John Bauer	Porsche 911
4	June 26	Road Atlanta	(United States) Bob Hagestad	Porsche 934	(United States) John Bauer	Porsche 911
5	July 9	Watkins Glen‡	(United States) Hurley Haywood (United States) Bob Hagestad	Porsche 934	(United States) Bob Lazier (United States) John Wood	Porsche 911 Carrera
6	July 31	Hallett	(United States) Peter Gregg	Porsche 934	(United States) Bob Tullius	Jaguar XJS
7	August 14	Brainerd	(United States) Peter Gregg	Porsche 934	(United States) Ron Weaver	Chevrolet Corvette
8	August 20	Mosport	(United States) Peter Gregg (France) Bob Wollek	Porsche 934	(United States) Bob Tullius (United States) Brian Fuerstenau	Jaguar XJS
9	September 3	Road America	(Canada) Ludwig Heimrath	Porsche 934	(United States) John Bauer	Porsche 911 SC
10	September 4	Road America	(United States) Peter Gregg	Porsche 934	(United States) Bob Tullius	Jaguar XJS
11	September 11	Mont Tremblant	(United States) Peter Gregg	Porsche 934	(United States) Bob Tullius	Jaguar XJS

‡ - The Watkins Glen 6 Hours was a round of the World Championship for Makes. The overall winner was an FIA Group 5 Porsche 935.

== Championships ==
=== Drivers ===
==== Category I ====
1. Bob Tullius – 170 points
2. John Bauer – 162 points
3. Tom Spalding – 125 points
4. John Wood – 80 points
5. Brian Fuerstenau – 60 points
6. Michael Oleyar – 60 points

==== Category II ====
1. Peter Gregg – 185 points
2. Ludwig Heimrath – 162 points
3. Monte Sheldon – 97 points
4. Hal Shaw, Jr. – 67 points
5. Greg Pickett – 65 points

=== Manufacturers ===
==== Category I ====
1. Porsche – 76 points
2. British Leyland – 74 points
3. Chevrolet – 69 points
4. Ford – 2 points

==== Category II ====
1. Porsche – 117 points
2. Chevrolet – 33 points

==== Under 2.5 Liter ====
1. Porsche – 61 points
2. Mazda – 24 points
3. Ford – 17 points
4. Datsun – 10 points
5. Lancia – 5 points
6. Renault – 5 points
