= 1983 Formula Atlantic season =

Motor racing competition

Seasons
- ← 1982 1984 →

The 1983 Formula Mondial North American Cup season was contested over 9 rounds. In this one-make engine formula all cars had to use Ford BDD engines. 57 different drivers competed in 8 different chassis.

== Calendar ==
Race No	Track	State	Date	Laps	Distance	Time	Speed	Winner	Pole position	Fastest race lap
1	Willow Springs	California	April 17, 1983	40	4.023.25=160.930 km	0'50:55.536	189.606 km/h	Roberto Moreno	Roberto Moreno	?
2	Riverside	California	April 23, 1983	31	5.230.22=162.137 km	0'52:58.903	183.615 km/h	Mark Moore	Michael Andretti	?
3	Sears Point	California	May 8, 1983	40	162.206 km| 1'00:28.170	160.941 km/h	Michael Andretti	Michael Andretti	?
4	Westwood	Canada	May 22, 1983	56	2.896.73=162.217 km	0'56:51.114	171.200 km/h	Michael Andretti	Michael Andretti	Michael Andretti
5	Detroit	Michigan	June 4, 1983	40	4.012=160.480 km	1'19:14.986	121.499 km/h	Josele Garza	Roberto Moreno	?
6	Montréal	Canada	June 11, 1983	37	4.421=163.577 km	1'02:12.382	157.775 km/h	Roberto Moreno	Roberto Moreno	?
7	Elkhart Lake	Wisconsin	July 16, 1983	25	6.437.20=160.930 km	0'59:06.02	163.380 km/h	Roberto Moreno	Michael Andretti	?
8	Trois-Rivières	Canada	September 4, 1983	48	3.379.53=162.217 km	1'17:12.810	126.054 km/h	Michael Andretti	Michael Andretti	John David Briggs
9	Mosport Park	Canada	September 11, 1983		40| 0'52:03.614	182.419 km/h	Roberto Moreno	Roberto Moreno	Roberto Moreno

== Final points standings ==
=== Driver ===
For every race the points were awarded: 30 points to the winner, 24 for runner-up, 19 for third place, 15 for fourth place, 12 for fifth place, 10 for sixth place, 9 seventh place, winding down to 1 point for 15th place. No additional points were awarded. All results count.

Place	Name	Country	Team	Chassis	Total points	(United States)	(United States)	(United States)	(Canada)	(United States)	(Canada)	(United States)	(Canada)	(Canada)
1	Michael Andretti	United States	Conte Racing	Ralt	188	24	-	30	30	2	24	24	30	24
2	Roberto Moreno	Brazil	Theodore Racing/Agapiou Racing	Ralt	151	30	2	24	-	5	30	30	-	30
3	Dan Marvin	United States	Norman Racing	Ralt	121	8	15	10	24	19	15	15	-	15
4	John David Briggs	United States	Briggs Racing	Ralt	108	15	24	15	10	15	10	-	-	19
5	Josele Garza	Mexico	McCall Racing	Ralt	78	12	-	-	-	30	12	-	24	-
6	Mike Rosen	United States	Brown Racing	Ralt	76	2		12	19	12	-	19	5	-
6	Mike Rosen	United States	Brown Racing	Tiga	76		7
7	Mark Moore	United States	Stuart Moore Racing	Ralt	60	1	30	5	-	24	-	-	-	-
8	Rod Cusumano	United States	Formula Rondo Racing	Ralt	41	-	3	-	-	8	8	-	10	12
9	Dave McMillan	New Zealand	McMillan Racing	Ralt	40	7		9
9	Dave McMillan	New Zealand	McMillan Racing	Dart	40		1		-	-	19	-	-	4
10	Rogelio Rodríguez	Mexico	Shea Racing	Ralt	31	9	10	-	-	10	2	-	-	-
11	Tommy Phillips		Pierre's Motor Racing	Ralt	27	-	-	-	15	-	-	12	-	-
12	Victor Gonzalez	United States	Shea Racing	Ralt	24	-	-	-	12
12	Victor Gonzalez	United States	Conte Racing	Ralt	24					3	9	-	-	-
13	Patrick Shelby	United States	Gianelli Race Preparation	Ralt	22	-	8	7	-	-	7	-	-	-
14	William Ayoub	Canada	Tiga	Tiga	21	-	-	-	-	-	-	-	12	9
15	Hubert Phipps	United States	Conte Racing	Ralt	19	19	-	-	-	-	-	-	-	-
	Norm Hunter	United States	Team Tui	Ralt	19	-	19	-	-	-	-	-	-	-
	Carlos Bobeda	United States	?	Ralt	19	10	9	-	-	-	-	-	-	-
	Tommy Byrne	Ireland	Theodore Racing/Agapiou Racing	Ralt	19	-	-	19	-	-	-	-	-	-
	Jim Opperman	United States	Opperman Racing	Special-March	19	-	-	-	-	6	5	8	-	-
	Price Cobb	United States	Stuart Moore Racing	Ralt	19	-	-	-	-	-	-	-	19	-
	Ron Canizares	United States	Larkin's Race Shop	Ralt	19	-	-	-	-	-	6	7	1	5
22	Joe Sposato	United States	?	Tiga	17	5	12	-	-	-	-	-	-	-
	Peter Hastrup	United States	?	Tiga	17	6	5	6	-	-	-	-	-	-
24	Jason Holehouse	Canada	J&J Racing	Ralt	16	-	-	-	-	-	-	6	-	10
25	Charles O'Brien	Australia	Theodore Racing/Agapiou Racing	Ralt	15	-	-	-	-	-	-	-	15	-
	Andy Falbo	United States	?	March	15	-	-	-	-	7	-	-	8	-
	Jimmy Santos	United States	Santos Racing	Ralt	15	-	-	8	-	-	-	-	7	-
28	Riley Hopkins		?	Ralt	14	-	6	-	8	-	-	-	-	-
29	Peter Greenfield	United States	Greenfield Industries	Ralt	13	-	-	-	-	-	3	10	-	-
	Wayne G. Horst	United States	Horst Racing	March	13	-	-	-	-	4	-	-	3	6
31	Mauro Lanaro	Canada	?	Lanaro Special (March)	12	-	-	-	-	-	1	-	4	7
32	Nick Wrzesinski	United States	?	March	10	-	-	-	-	9	-	1	-	-
33	Ross Bentley	Canada	?	Johnston	9	-	-	-	9	-	-	-	-	-
	Howard Cherry	United States	Hansaloy Corp.	Ralt	9	-	-	-	-	-	-	9	-	-
	Gene Griesel	United States	?	March	9	-	-	-	-	-	-	-	9	-
	Michael Angus	United States	Eagle Racing	March	9	-	-	-	-	-	-	3	6	-
37	Peter Dragffy	Canada	T.R.T. Sports	Lola	8	-	-	-	-	-	-	-	-	8
38	Marco Akerstream		?	Ralt	7	-	-	-	7	-	-	-	-	-
39	Phil Simon	United States	?	March	6	-	-	-	6	-	-	-	-	-
40	Carl Bergren		?	March	5	-	-	-	-	-	-	5	-	-
41	Bob Noll		?	Ralt	4	4	-	-	-	-	-	-	-	-
	Jeff McPherson		?	Ralt	4	-	4	-	-	-	-	-	-	-
	Nancy James	United States	?	Ralt	4	-	-	4	-	-	-	-	-	-
	Scott Goodyear	Canada	Agapiou Racing	Ralt	4	-	-	-	-	-	4	-	-	-
	Carl Liebach	United States	?	March	4	-	-	-	-	-	-	4	-	-
	James King	United States	?	Ralt	4	-	-	-	-	-	-	2	2	-
47	Tom Blackaller		?	Ralt	3	3	-	-	-	-	-	-	-	-
	Rod Bennett	United States	?	Ralt	3	-	-	3	-	-	-	-	-	-
49	Mike Buckenham	United States	?	March	2	-	-	2	-	-	-	-	-	-
50	Ed Pimm	United States	Tiga/Brown Racing	Tiga	1	-	-	1	-	-	-	-	-	-
	Bill O'Connor		Comprep Racing	Ralt	1	-	-	-	-	1	-	-	-	-

Note:

Race 4 and 9 not all points were awarded (not enough competitors).

== See also ==
- Formula Mondial
