= Westwood Plateau =

- Neighbourhood of Coquitlam
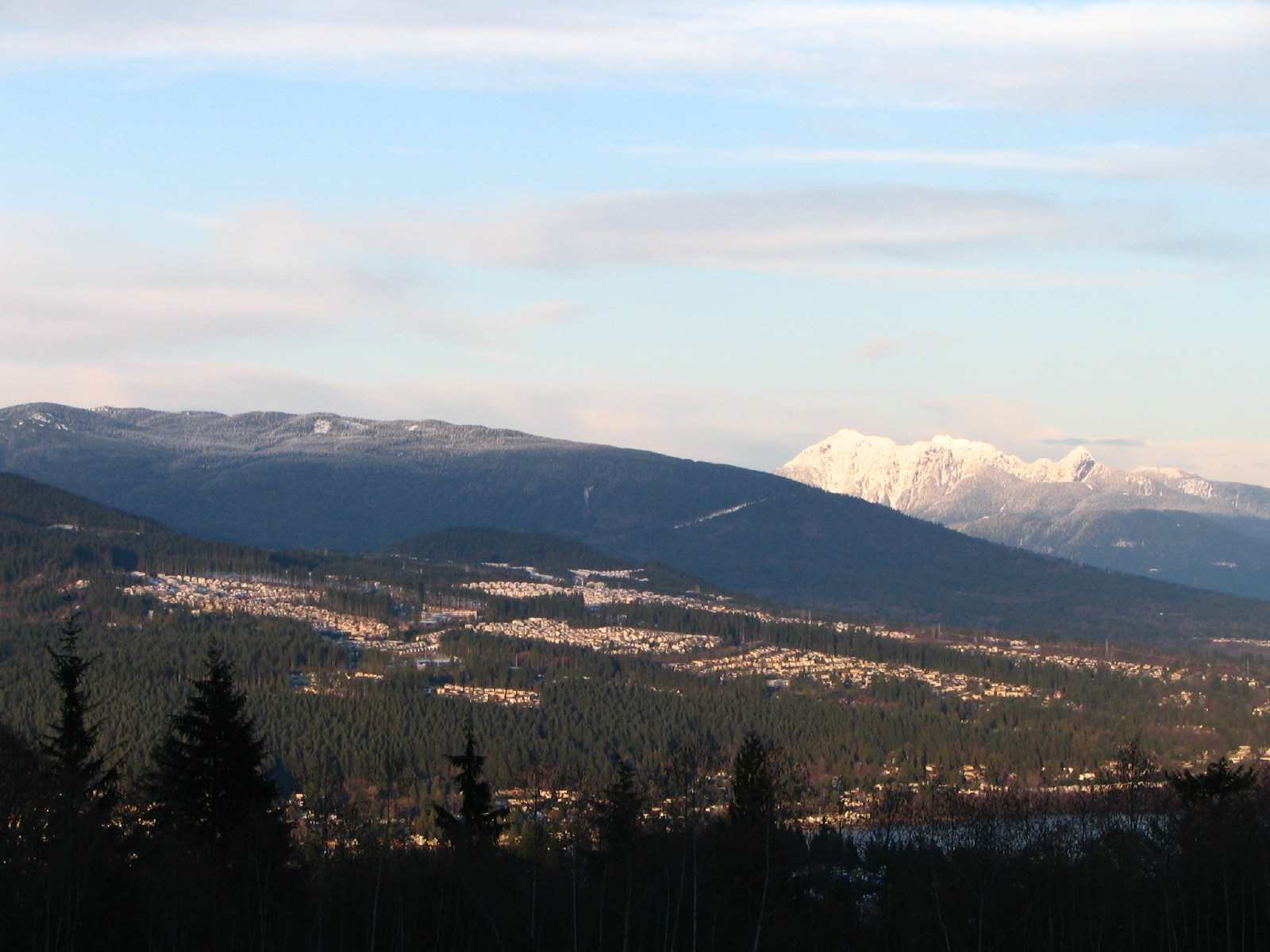
- Westwood Plateau, with Burke Mountain behind and Golden Ears Provincial Park in the distance

- Location of Westwood Plateau within Metro Vancouver
- Coordinates: 49°18′N 122°47′W
- Country: Canada
- Province: British Columbia
- Region: Lower Mainland
- Regional district: Metro Vancouver
- City: Coquitlam

Government
  - Mayor: Craig Hodge
  - MP (Fed.): Ron McKinnon (Liberal)
  - MLA (Prov.): Ryan Peterson (BC Conservative)

Area
  - Land: 570 ha (1,400 acres)
- Highest elevation: 400 m (1,300 ft)
- Lowest elevation: 60 m (200 ft)

Population (2021)
  - Total: 19,112
  - Density: 3,400/km^{2} (8,700/sq mi)
- Time zone: UTC−07:00 (Pacific Time)
- Postal code span: V3E−V3J
- Area codes: 604, 778, 236, 672

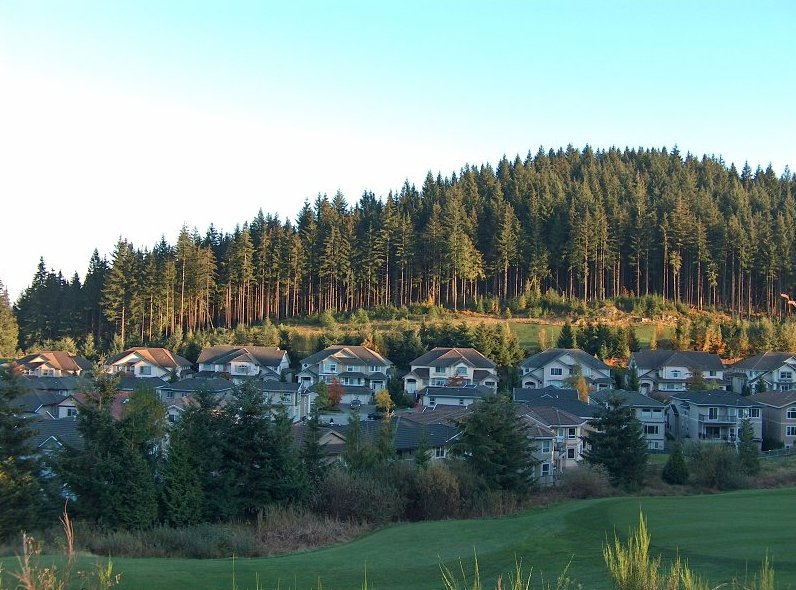
Homes on Westwood Plateau

Westwood Plateau is a neighbourhood in the northern region of Coquitlam, British Columbia.

It is named for Westwood Motorsport Park which existed on the plateau before the community was built, and was closed in 1990 to make way for real estate development. Hampton Park Elementary School was built on top of the actual raceway.

== History ==
The area currently known as Westwood Plateau was crown land purchased by Wesbild Corp. in 1989, and between then and 2005 transformed the area into a residential community of 4525 homes and in 2010 is home to about 15,000 residents.

== Geography ==
Westwood Plateau is bounded by the city boundary with Port Moody to the west, David Avenue to the south, and Pipeline Road to the east. It lies on 1,400 acres (6 km^{2}) on the southern portion of Eagle Mountain. Although touted as a plateau, the area is actually sloped rising from between 60 and 100 metres above sea level to almost 400 metres. Some roadways are quite steep, but mostly gently curving roads climb to the top where a golf course is located.

=== Urban planning ===
The area features extensive greenbelts that protect existing creeks. Almost half the area, or 285 hectares (700 acres) was retained as green space in this way, including a 400 metre high promontory at the centre of Ridge Park. 2349 detached single family style homes make up the majority of the buildings in the area. Lot sizes per home vary between 0.10 and 0.30 acres (400 and 1,210 m^{2}), with most being in the 0.10-to-0.15-acre (400 to 610 m^{2}) range. Townhomes, duplexes, and condominium style homes contribute another 2174 units. Due to the extensive preservation of natural areas, the effective population density is less than 12 people per acre making it a low density suburb. However, the built-up area itself, at 22 people per acre, would classify it as a compact neighbourhood.

== Demographics ==
Population history
Year	Pop.	±%
2006	17,032	—
2011	19,783	+16.2%
2016	19,776	−0.0%
2021	19,112	−3.4%
Source: Statistics Canada

Panethnic groups in Westwood Plateau (2006−2021)
Panethnic group	2021 Canadian census		2016 Canadian census		2011 Canadian census		2006 Canadian census	
Panethnic group	Pop.	%	Pop.	%	Pop.	%	Pop.	%
East Asian (Note: Statistic includes total responses of "Chinese", "Korean", and "Japanese" under visible minority section on census.)	7,600	39.77%	8,530	43.14%	8,350	42.38%	8,025	47.12%
European (Note: Statistic includes all persons that did not make up part of a visible minority or an indigenous identity.)	5,800	30.35%	6,670	33.73%	6,470	32.83%	5,470	32.12%
Middle Eastern (Note: Statistic includes total responses of "West Asian" and "Arab" under visible minority section on census.)	2,800	14.65%	2,190	11.07%	2,315	11.75%	1,325	7.78%
South Asian	825	4.32%	795	4.02%	890	4.52%	895	5.26%
Southeast Asian (Note: Statistic includes total responses of "Filipino" and "Southeast Asian" under visible minority section on census.)	620	3.24%	650	3.29%	760	3.86%	680	3.99%
Latin American	440	2.3%	240	1.21%	280	1.42%	250	1.47%
Indigenous	245	1.28%	205	1.04%	150	0.76%	55	0.32%
African	250	1.31%	55	0.28%	105	0.53%	75	0.44%
Other/multiracial (Note: Statistic includes total responses of "Visible minority, n.i.e." and "Multiple visible minorities" under visible minority section on census.)	530	2.77%	440	2.23%	385	1.95%	255	1.5%
Total responses	19,110	99.99%	19,775	99.99%	19,705	99.61%	17,030	99.99%
Total population	19,112	100%	19,776	100%	19,783	100%	17,032	100%
Note: Totals greater than 100% due to multiple origin responses.

Religious groups in Westwood Plateau (2011−2021)
Religious group	2021 Canadian census		2011 Canadian census	
Religious group	Pop.	%	Pop.	%
Irreligion	9,670	50.6%	8,590	43.59%
Christianity	6,325	33.1%	7,720	39.18%
Islam	1,810	9.47%	1,790	9.08%
Buddhism	615	3.22%	765	3.88%
Hinduism	210	1.1%	205	1.04%
Sikhism	135	0.71%	145	0.74%
Judaism	10	0.05%	95	0.48%
Indigenous spirituality	0	0%	0	0%
Other	320	1.67%	340	1.73%
Total responses	19,110	99.99%	19,705	99.61%
Total population	19,112	100%	19,783	100%

== Infrastructure ==
=== Transportation ===
Private automobile provides the fastest means of transport as Coquitlam and surrounding areas are amply provided with roads and free parking. The area is served by public transit buses at a minimum frequency of every thirty minutes most of the day. Service increases to every fifteen minutes during peak hours and reduces to once per hour late at night. Travel times on bus to Downtown Port Moody or Coquitlam Town Centre are 15–20 minutes. The West Coast Express commuter rail service to Downtown Vancouver leaves from Coquitlam and Port Moody during weekday peak, and frequent rapid transit on Vancouver's SkyTrain network can be accessed from Lafarge Lake–Douglas station, Lincoln station, and Coquitlam Central station.

=== Schools ===
- Elementary schools
  - Bramblewood Elementary
  - Panorama Heights Elementary
  - Pinetree Elementary
  - Hampton Park Elementary
- Middle schools
  - Summit Middle School

=== Retail ===
- Westwood Plateau Village

=== Recreation & Leisure ===
Westwood Plateau has approximately 23 km (14 mi) of hiking trails. There are many parks in the area such as Bramble Park, Ridge Park, Panorama Park, North Hoy Creek Park, and Hampton Park. There are also two golf courses, Westwood Plateau Golf & Country Club and Westwood Plateau Executive 12-Hole Course.
