= Westwood Plateau Golf & Country Club =

Golf club in Coquitlam, British Columbia

Coordinates: 49.305940°N 122.805898°W

- Interactive map of Westwood Plateau; Golf & Country Club

Club information
- Location: Coquitlam, B.C.
- Established: 1995; 31 years ago
- Type: Public
- Total holes: 27
- Website: westwoodplateaugolf.com

The Country Club (18 holes)
- Designed by: Michael Hurdzan
- Par: 72
- Length: 6770 yards Longest hole is #7 - 583 yards
- Course rating: 71.90

Executive 12-hole
- Designed by: Michael Hurdzan
- Par: 31
- Length: 1805 yards Longest hole is #5 - 310 yards

Westwood Plateau Golf & Country Club, located in the Canadian city of Coquitlam, British Columbia, comprises two golf courses set into the hillside of Eagle Mountain.

== Summary ==
Westwood Motorsport Park had occupied the Crown lands from 1957 to 1990, when the track's lease expired, the track was closed and the provincial government sold off the land to real estate developers. Built along with the surrounding Westwood Plateau neighborhood, WPGCC was designed by Michael Hurdzan and opened in 1995. The main course, the Country Club is a par-72 eighteen-hole course with a maximum length of 6770 yards. The executive course, the Golf Academy, is a par-31 nine-hole course that plays longer than typical learning courses. There is also a separate three-hole, par-3 course.

Golf Digest named WPGCC as the runner-up for 'Best New Course in Canada in 1995', while SCOREGolf Magazine named the club the 'Best New Course in Canada in 1996', and currently ranks it 90th in the country. The facility also features two distinct restaurants, a teaching academy and a 35,000-square-foot (3,300 m^{2}) clubhouse.

== See also ==
- List of golf courses in British Columbia
