= Sports Car Club of British Columbia =

Sports Car Club of British Columbia (SCCBC) is a motorsport club based in British Columbia, Canada. The club was founded in 1951 as a non-profit society and is currently active at Mission Raceway Park.

Early days saw the membership host races at airports in Cassidy and Abbotsford. In the late 1950s, the club built a new road racing circuit on the remote, rural hillside in Coquitlam, a suburb of Vancouver. The track became known as Westwood Motorsport Park and was the first permanent, purpose-built road circuit in Canada. Built through volunteer hours and money raised through the sale of debentures, the track was the focal point of the club for over thirty years until encroaching urban development forced it to permanently close in 1990. During the Westwood years, the club held successful events that attracted later well-known drivers such as Gilles Villeneuve, Keke Rosberg, and Bobby Rahal.

In the early years, the SCCBC also held hill climbs, rallies, and gymkhanas at various venues around BC. The club promoted the sport and their organisation through participation in car shows and other public events.

In 1994, the SCCBC opened a 2 km road circuit referred to as River's Edge Road Course, part of Mission Raceway Park. The club has operated at this venue since then, hosting events throughout the racing season.

The club publishes a monthly newsletter called Pit Pass.
