= Westwood Motorsport Park =

Race track in Coquitlam, British Columbia

Mountain High Racing
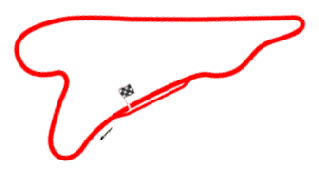
- Road Course (1959–1990)
- Location: Coquitlam, British Columbia
- Coordinates: 49°18′34.56″N 122°47′13.2″W
- Owner: Province of British Columbia
- Operator: Sports Car Club of British Columbia
- Broke ground: 1957
- Opened: 1959
- Closed: 1990
- Major events: Atlantic Championship (1971–1990); Trans-Am Series (1977–1980); NASCAR Winston West Series (1973–1974); Player's GM Challenge Series (1987–1990)

Road Course (1959–1990)
- Length: 2.897 km (1.800 mi)
- Turns: 8
- Race lap record: 0:59.705 ( (Japan) Hiro Matsushita, Swift DB4, 1989, Formula Atlantic)

Westwood Motorsport Park (or Westwood Racing Circuit) was a 2.897 km (1.800 mi) 8-turn motorsport race track located in Coquitlam, British Columbia on the southern slopes of Eagle Mountain (known locally as Eagle Ridge).

== History ==
The track was built and operated by the Sports Car Club of British Columbia (SCCBC). Construction of Westwood began in 1957, and the first race was held on July 26, 1959, making it the first purpose-built permanent road course in Canada.

Westwood hosted many different professional race series over the years, including long stints with the Formula Atlantic Series, Trans-Am Series, and Player's GM Challenge Series. Champion drivers to have raced professionally at Westwood include Formula One World Champion Keke Rosberg, Indianapolis 500 winners Bobby Rahal and Danny Sullivan, as well as other famous names including Gilles Villeneuve and Michael Andretti.

The December 12, 1988 episode of MacGyver, titled Collision Course, was primarily filmed at Westwood (where it was referred to as the Westwood Springs Race Course). The Player's GM Challenge Series served as the backdrop of the story.

The track, which was located on leased provincial crown land, eventually fell victim to urban development. The track finally closed in 1990 to make way for the Westwood Plateau housing development and the Westwood Plateau Golf & Country Club.

== Lap records ==
The fastest official race lap records at the Westwood Motorsport Park are listed as:

Category	Time	Driver	Vehicle	Event
Full Circuit (1959–1990): 2.897 km (1.800 mi)
Formula Atlantic	0:59.705	Hiro Matsushita	Swift DB4	1989 Westwood Atlantic Championship round
Trans-Am	1:06.960	Greg Pickett	Chevrolet Corvette	1978 Westwood Trans-Am round
Group 4	1:11.300	Eppie Wietzes	Ford GT40	1966 Westwood CSCC round
Group 3	1:18.000	Bob Stevens	Chevrolet Corvette Stingray	1970 Westwood 500

== Major race results ==
=== CASC / SCCA Atlantic Championship ===
Year	Date	Driver	Car
1971	Oct 3	(Canada) Craig Hill	Lotus 69B
1972	July 9	(Canada) Craig Hill	Lotus 69B
1973	May 27	(United States) Allan Lader	Brabham BT40
1974	May 26	(United States) Allan Lader	Chevron B27
1975	June 1	(Sweden) Bertil Roos	March 75B
1976	May 30	(United States) Marty Loft	March 76B
1977	July 17	(Finland) Keke Rosberg	Chevron B34
1978	April 23	(Finland) Keke Rosberg	Chevron B-45
1979	June 3	(United States) Kevin Cogan	Ralt RT-1
1980	June 1	(Canada) Jacques Villeneuve Sr.	March 80A
1981	Aug 23	(Mexico) Rogelio Rodriguez	Ralt RT4
1982	Aug 23	(United States) Tommy Phillips	Ralt RT4
1983	May 22	(United States) Michael Andretti	Ralt RT4
1984	July 22	(United States) Chris Bender	
1985	July 21	(United States) Dan Marvin	
1986	July 6	(United States) Ted Prappas	
1987	Aug 23	(United States) Johnny O'Connell	
1988	Aug 6	(United States) Dean Hall	
1988	Aug 7	(United States) Rod Granberry	
1988	Sept 11	(Japan) Hiro Matsushita	
1989	May 28	(Japan) Hiro Matsushita	Swift DB4
1989	Aug 5	(Japan) Hiro Matsushita	Swift DB4
1990	Aug 5	(United States) Mark Dismore	Swift DB4

=== SCCA Trans-Am Series ===
Year	Date	Driver	Car
1977	June 5	(United States) Peter Gregg	Porsche 934
1978	June 4	(Canada) Ludwig Heimrath	Porsche 935
1979	June 3	(United States) John Paul	Porsche 935
1980	Sept 7	(United States) John Bauer	Porsche 911SC

== See also ==
- List of auto racing tracks in Canada
