= Jaguar XJS =

Grand tourer manufactured by Jaguar Cars

Jaguar XJ-S Jaguar XJS
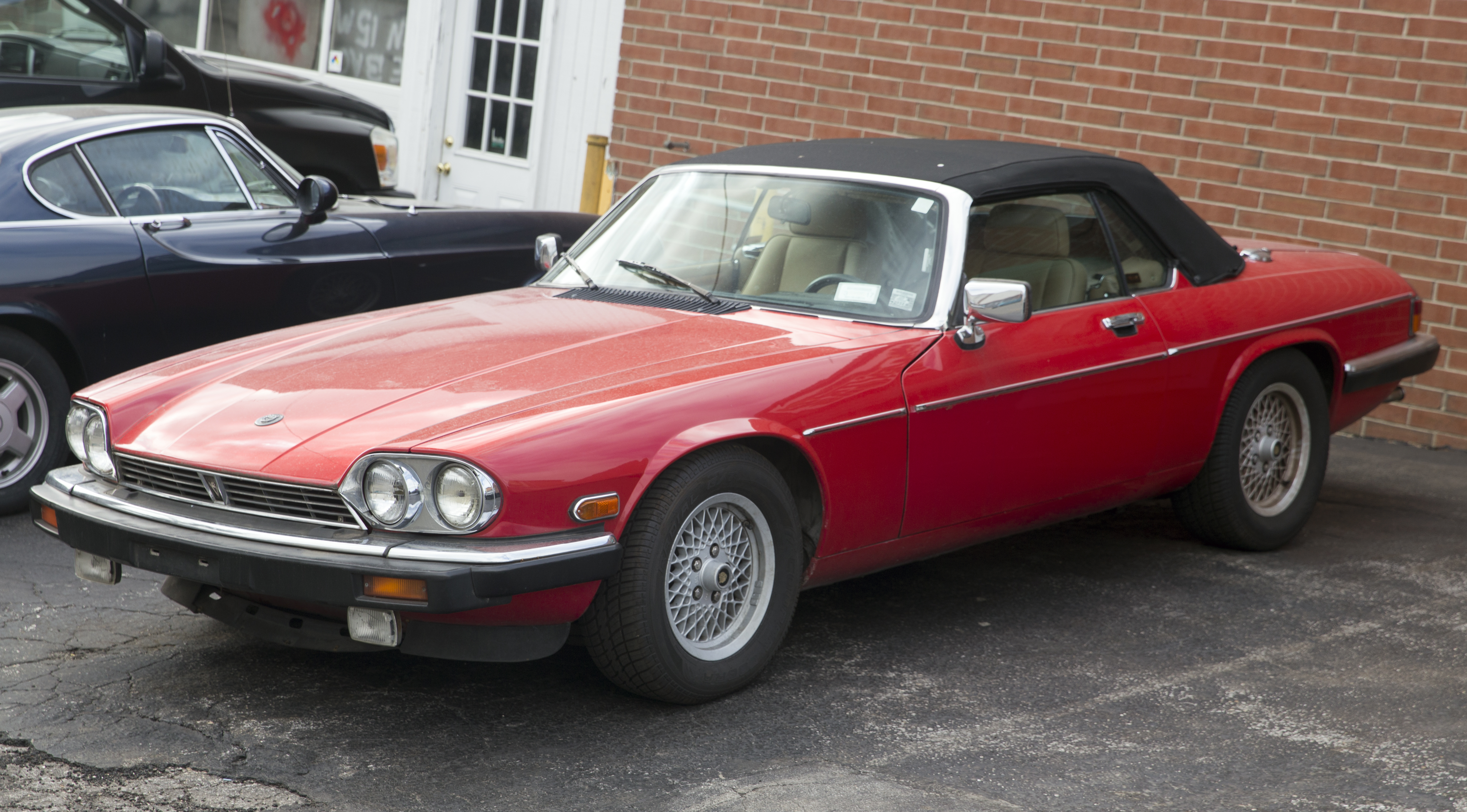

Overview
- Manufacturer: Jaguar Cars
- Model code: XJ27
- Production: September 1975 – April 1996
- Assembly: United Kingdom: Coventry
- Designer: Malcolm Sayer (early design); Geoff Lawson (facelift)

Body and chassis
- Class: Grand tourer
- Layout: Front-engine, rear-wheel-drive

Chronology
- Predecessor: Jaguar E-Type
- Successor: Jaguar XK8

The Jaguar XJ-S (later called XJS) is a luxury grand tourer manufactured and marketed by British car manufacturer Jaguar Cars from 1975 to 1996, in coupé, fixed-profile and full convertible bodystyles. There were three distinct iterations, with a total production of 115,413 units over 20 years and 7 months.

Originally developed by Chief Engineer William Heynes using the platform of the then-current XJ saloon, the XJ-S was noted for its prominent rear buttresses. The early styling was partially by Jaguar's aerodynamicist Malcolm Sayer—one of the first designers to apply advanced aerodynamic principles to cars; however, Sayer died in 1970, before the design was finalised.

Its final iteration, produced from 1991 to 1996, was manufactured after Jaguar was acquired by Ford, who introduced numerous modifications – and eliminated the hyphen in the name, marketing Jaguar's longest-running model simply as the XJS.

== Pre-HE (1975–1981) ==
XJ-S (Pre H.E.)
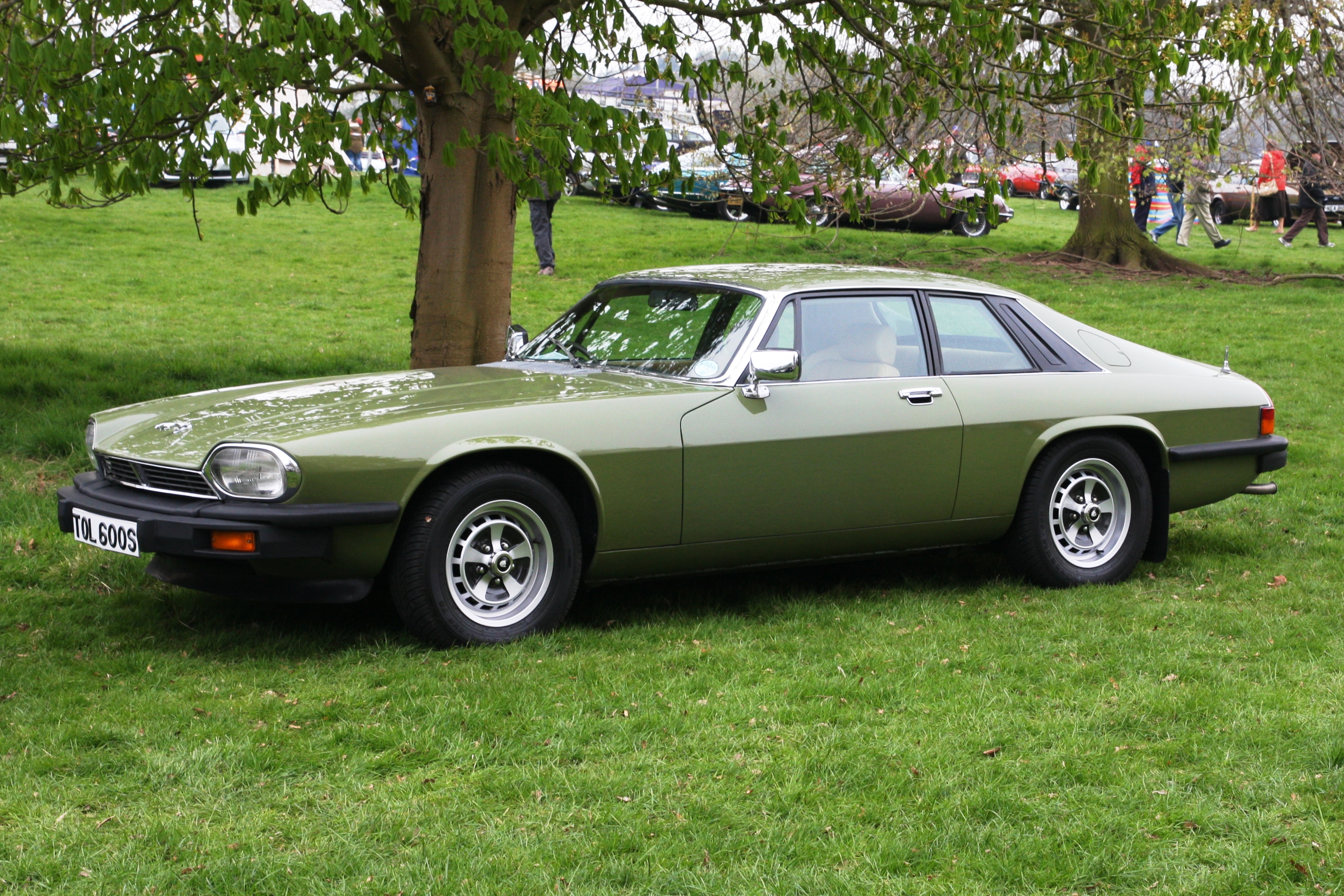

Overview
- Production: 1975–1981; 14,800 built

Body and chassis
- Body style: 2-door coupé

Powertrain
- Engine: 5.3 L Jaguar V12
- Transmission: 4-speed manual 3-speed BorgWarner automatic 3-speed GM TH400 automatic

Dimensions
- Wheelbase: 102 in (2,591 mm)
- Length: 191.72 in (4,870 mm)
- Width: 70.6 in (1,793 mm)
- Height: 50 in (1,270 mm)

The XJ-S was introduced on 10 September 1975. The design and development had begun in the late 1960s by the code name of project XJ27, with an initial shape penned by Malcolm Sayer, but after his death in 1970 it was completed by the in-house Jaguar design team, headed by Doug Thorpe. The design was radical for the time, with long overhangs and the 'flying buttresses' that swept down the rear of the roofline. A common misconception of these design details is that they were a leftover from a potential mid-engine layout, with the black plastic vents behind the rear windows being functional to that design. While a mid-engine layout was considered, it never made it past initial brainstorming. The buttresses were always meant to be merely a styling feature that improved aerodynamics.

Power came from the Jaguar V12 engine with a choice of a manual or an automatic transmission, but the manual was soon dropped as they were left over from V12 E Type production. V12 powered production automobiles were unusual at the time; Italian luxury sports car makers Lamborghini and Ferrari produced such models. The specifications of the XJ-S compared well with both Italian cars; it was able to accelerate to 97 km/h (60 mph) in 7.6 seconds (automatic models) and had a top speed of 230 km/h (143 mph). The first series of XJ-S cars had a BorgWarner Model 12 transmission with a cast-iron case and a bolt-on bell-housing. In 1977, General Motors' Turbo-Hydramatic 400 transmissions were fitted. The TH400 transmission was an all-aluminium alloy case with an integrated non-detachable bell-housing. The XJ-S was originally supplied with Dunlop SP Super E205/70VR15 tyres on 6K alloy wheels; British police upgraded their Jaguars to a higher-performance 205/70VR15 Michelin XWX tyres. At the end of the 1970s Jaguar started to fit the 205/70VR15 Pirelli P5. The Pirelli P5 was the tyre that Jaguar had asked Pirelli to produce to improve their luxury cars. European and Canadian spec XJ-S models were fitted with two molded headlights, while models for the US (until 1992) were fitted with four round sealed beam lights due to legislation. Early XJ-S models featured the lower section of the boot lid and taillamp trim pieces being painted black, although this option would be phased out by 1978 in favor of body-colour paint and chrome trim respectively.

Jaguar launched the XJ-S in the wake of a fuel crisis, when the market for a 5.3-litre V12 grand tourer was small. The XJ-S was a radical departure from the E-Type it replaced, having shifted from being a sports car to a GT and losing the option of a convertible roof. The buttresses behind the windows were criticised at the time as German authorities feared these would restrict rearward vision, and refused to give type approval to the XJ-S (and to the similarly designed Lancia Montecarlo) – requiring German XJ-S buyers to obtain road approval for each individual car upon registration. Sales remained stubbornly low, and production was halted for half of 1981, to allow unsold stock to be moved. Because of the slow sales, Leyland Cars had decided to discontinue the car but decided to give it another chance with a light facelift and engine revisions.

Italian styling house Pininfarina introduced a 1978 concept car based on the XJ-S, called the Jaguar XJSpider; which did not see production.

== HE (1981–1991) ==
XJ-S H.E., 3.6, XJ-SC
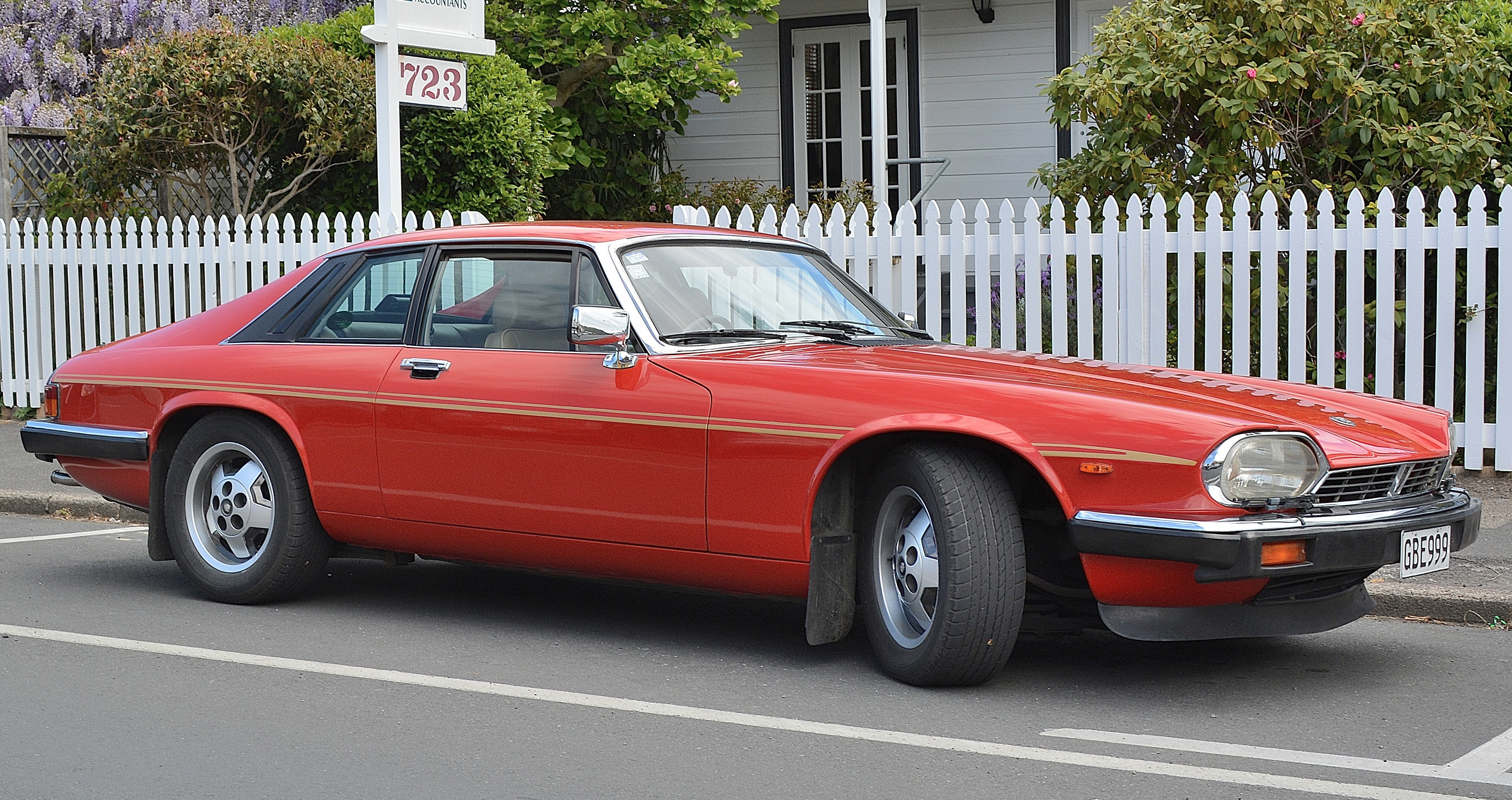

Overview
- Production: 1981–1991; 73,207 built

Body and chassis
- Body style: 2-door coupé; 2-door targa convertible (1983–1988, V12 from 1985); 2-door full convertible (from 1988)

Powertrain
- Engine: 3.6 L AJ6 I6; 5.3 L HE V12
- Transmission: 5-speed Getrag 265 manual (3.6 only); 4-speed ZF automatic; 3-speed GM TH400 automatic (V12)

Dimensions
- Wheelbase: 102.0 in (2,591 mm)
- Length: 191.7 in (4,869 mm)
- Width: 70.6 in (1,793 mm)
- Height: 47.8 in (1,214 mm)

From July 1981, the XJ-S was renamed the XJ-S HE and received the new High-Efficiency V12 engine for much better fuel economy. A positive side effect of the more efficient "Fire Ball" combustion chamber designed by Swiss Engineer Michael May was that power output was increased to 295 hp (220 kW; 299 PS) or 263 hp (196 kW) in North America. At the same time, the XJ-S HE received changes to its exterior and interior: new five-spoke "Starfish" alloy wheels fitted with 215/70R15 Pirelli Cinturato P5 tyres, chrome inserts on the upper part of the bumpers, and burled elm inserts on dashboard and door cappings.

=== Six-cylinder and convertible models ===
In 1983, the new 3.6-litre Jaguar AJ6 straight-six engine was introduced along with a new convertible model called the XJ-SC. The coupé's rather small rear seats were removed in order to make space for the removable soft top, making it a strict two-seater car. The XJ-SC was not a full convertible but was a fixed profile variant with a non-removable centre targa-type structure, fixed cant rails above the doors, and fixed rear quarter windows. The six-cylinder cars can be identified by a raised bonnet centre section.

Between 1983 and 1987, the six-cylinder-engined cars were only available with a five-speed manual transmission (Getrag 265), with a four-speed automatic (ZF 4HP22) offered from 1987 onwards (along with improved fuel injection as used on the XJ40). The V12 models continued to use the stronger Turbo-Hydramatic 400 transmission. The earlier manual models were not imported by Jaguar into the United States, which had to wait until the facelift manual 4-litre XJS coupé and convertible became available. A V12 powered XJ-SC was introduced in 1985.

The two-seat XJ-SC targa-type model, never a great success in the marketplace, was replaced by a two-seat full convertible in 1988 which proved to be a great hit.

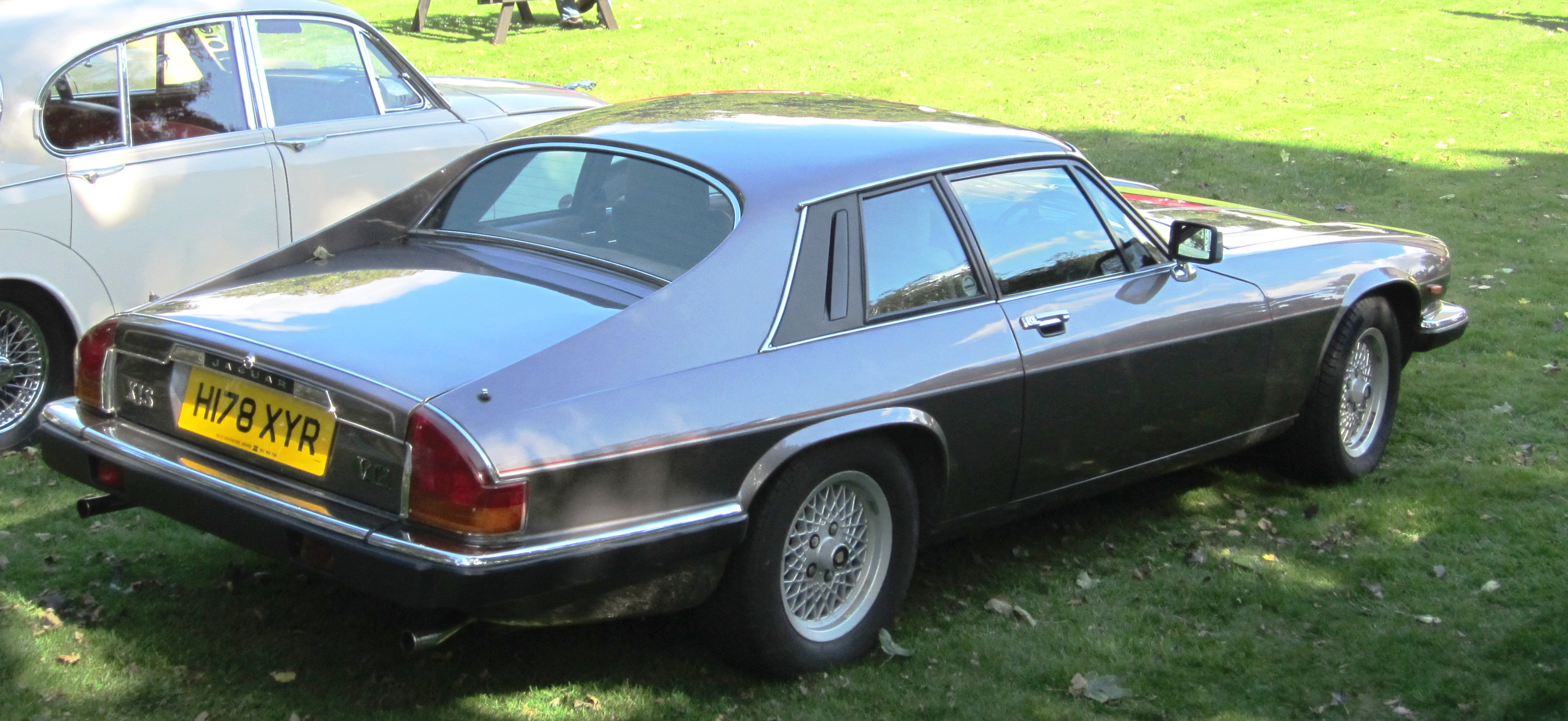
Rear view (V12 HE)

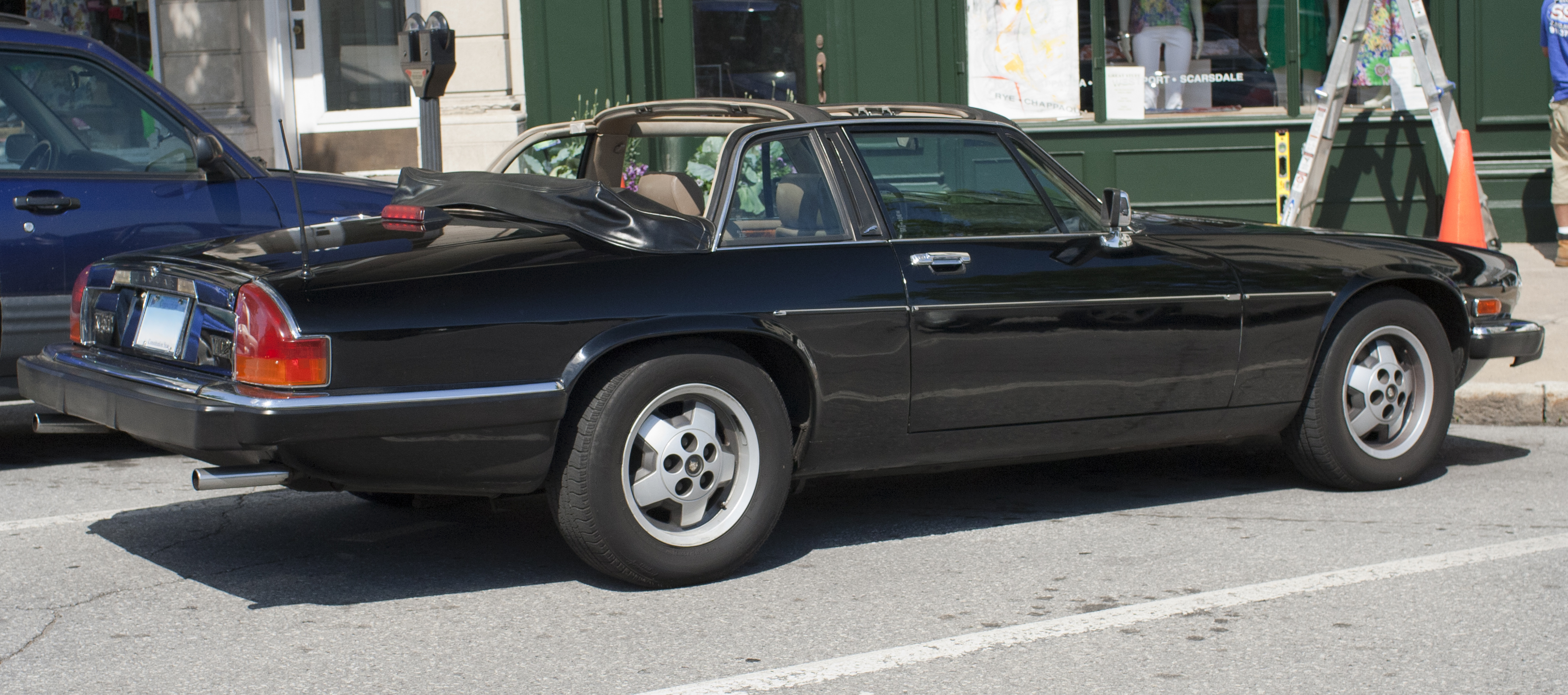
1986 Jaguar XJ-SC targa convertible (US spec)

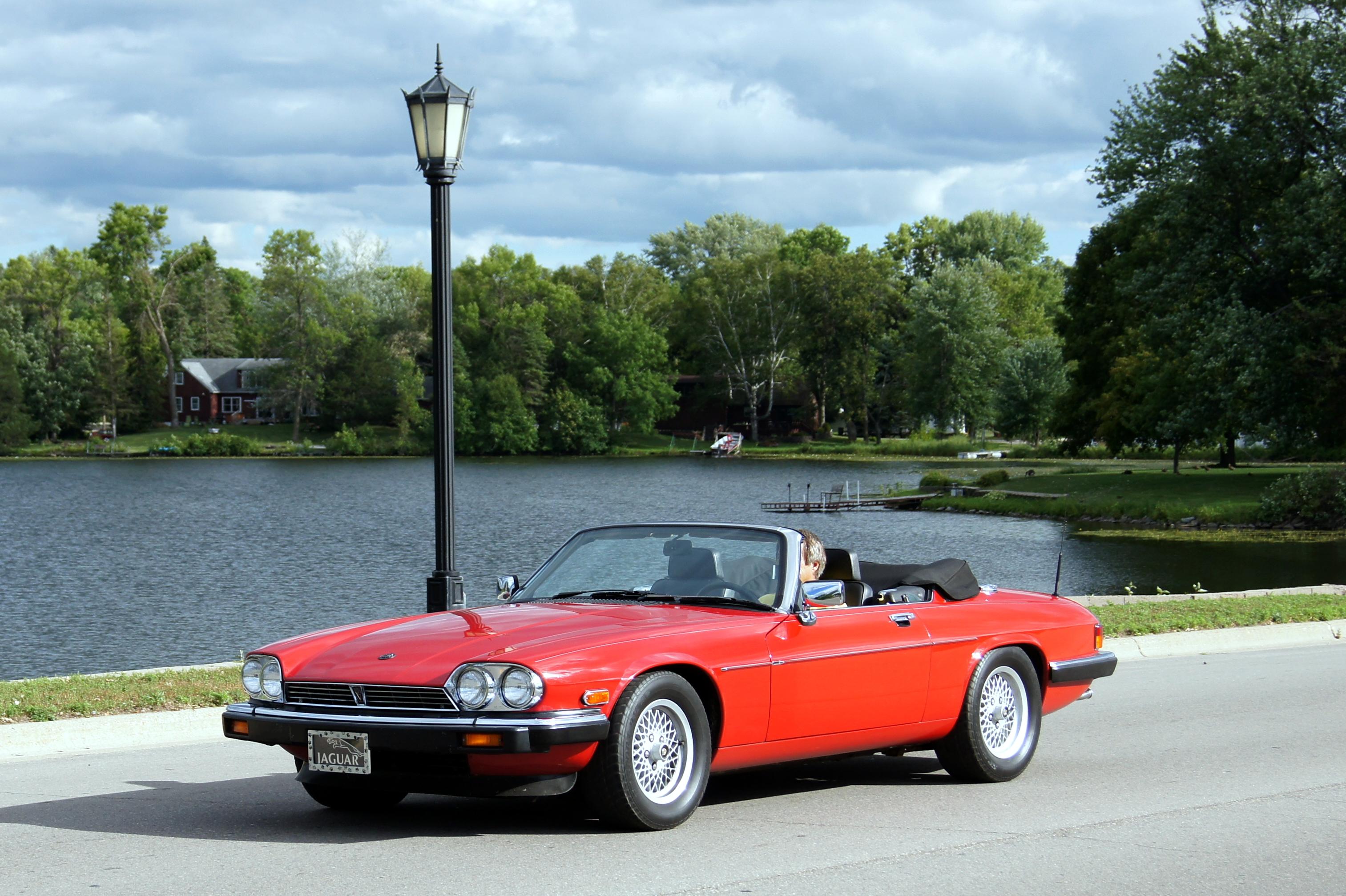
Pre-facelift XJ-S (full) convertible (US spec)

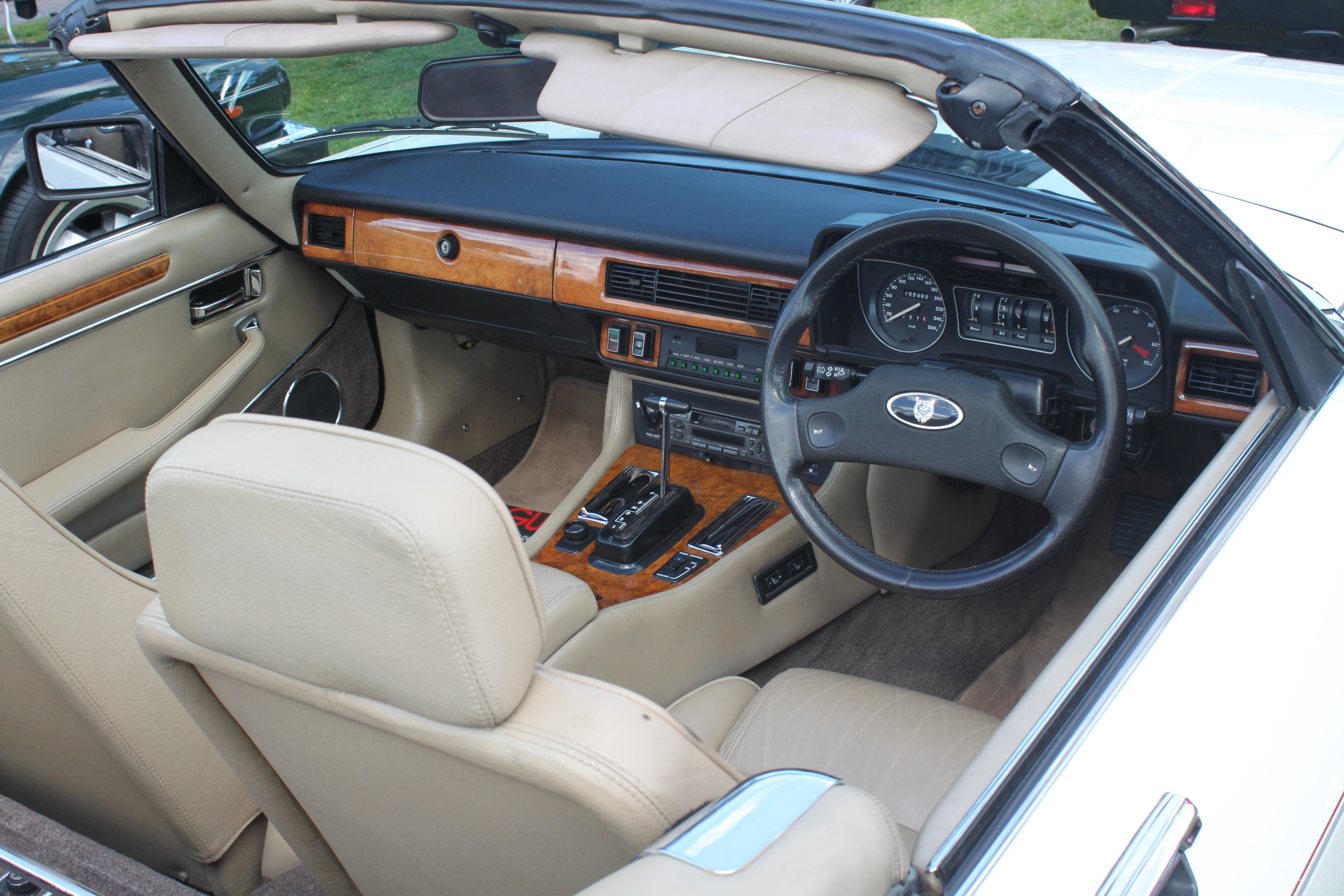
Interior (convertible)

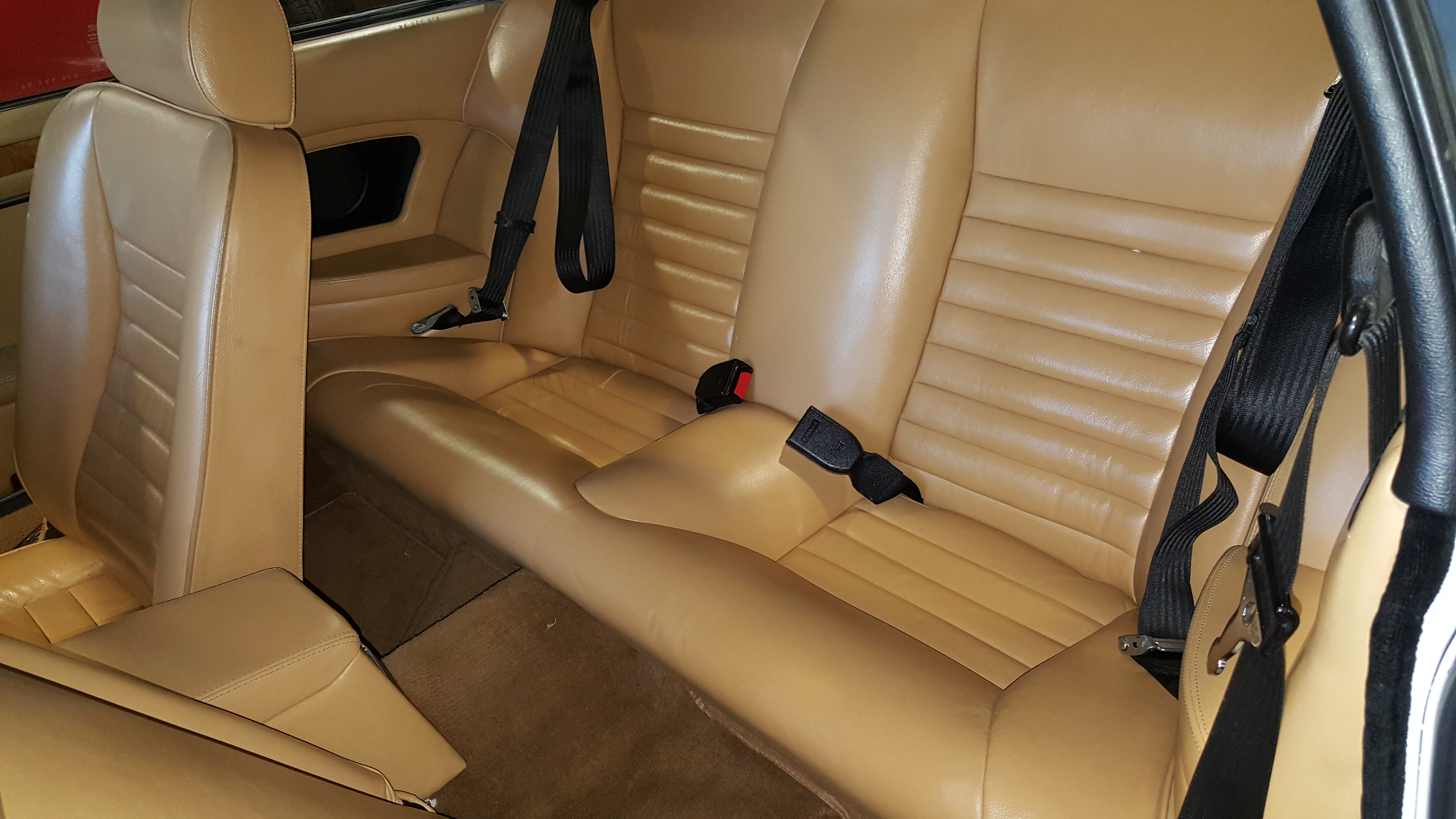
Rear seats of a 1982 XJ-S HE coupé, showing the 2+2 seating layout

XJ-SC

The first XJ-SC was produced on June 28, 1982, the last January 26, 1988. In all 5013 XJ-SC Cabriolets were built. These cars were different in that they had a Targa/Convertible body style with removable Targa panels over the two seater passenger compartment, similar to T-tops, plus a fabric rear section including the rear window; there was an optional hard top for the rear section. Approximately 1598 Right Hand Drive and 3416 Left Hand Drive cars built. Whilst there are a small number of the XJ-SC cars with the rear seat conversion, Jaguar Cars only produced one such car which was specially built for Princess Diana. The rear roof section on this car was fully secured in place and could not be removed. This conversion was later carried out by several aftermarket companies on owners cars, not with the approval of the works.

=== Hess & Eisenhardt convertible ===
From 1986, a full convertible version was available through some dealers, modified by Hess & Eisenhardt in the USA. The Hess & Eisenhardt coachbuilding firm was located in Ohio, USA, and built convertible modifications for the XJ-S under contract from Jaguar, before the official Jaguar-built XJ-S full convertible became available in 1988.

The Hess & Eisenhardt convertible differed from the later Jaguar-built XJS convertible as its un-padded top folded down deeper into the body structure of the car resulting in a cleaner rear profile when the roof was lowered. To accommodate this design element, the Hess & Eisenhardt convertibles have two separate fuel tanks, positioned to allow for the roof to fully retract. The process of converting the stock Jaguar XJS coupé into the H&E Convertible included the post-production removal of the roof, cutting the body in several sections, the addition of steel reinforcements behind the driver's seat, and 9.1 kg (20 lb) weights placed just behind the headlights to eliminate harmonic resonance caused by the significant modifications to the car. H&E XJS convertibles are easily identified by the lower folding top, as well as two small badges located just behind the front wheels. The later Jaguar full convertible had a heavier padded top that did not fold as low as the H&E convertible, but retained nearly all of the original components of the coupé.

The number of H&E Jaguar XJS produced is unknown, partly because a fire at the Hess & Eisenhardt factory destroyed most of the records pertaining to the Jaguar XJS conversions. According to some sources, a total of 2,100 cars were converted.

=== Police demonstrator ===
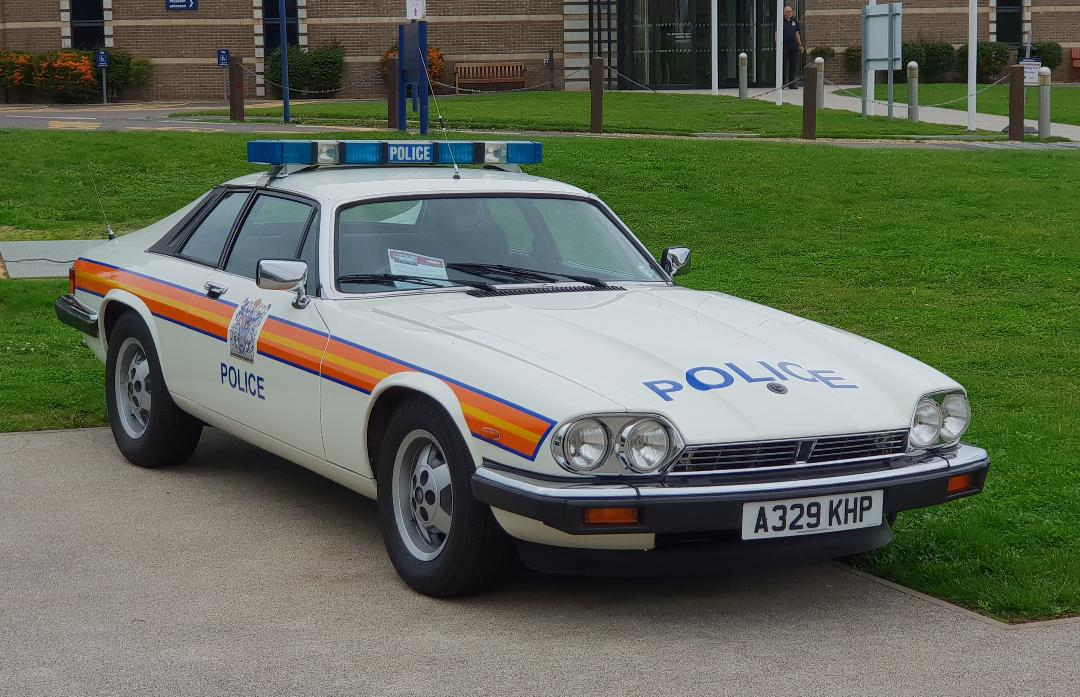
The Jaguar XJS Police Special demonstrator at the British Motor Museum, restored in the livery of the Metropolitan Police

In 1984, a Jaguar XJS with a 3.6l engine and manual transmission was converted by Jaguar Special Vehicle Operations into a Police Special demonstrator vehicle, fitted with a police lightbar on the roof, a police radio in the centre console and plastic interior trim including cloth seats to replace luxury furnishings. The Police Special XJS demonstrator was loaned by Jaguar to a number of police forces across the United Kingdom, including the Warwickshire Constabulary, Greater Manchester Police and the Metropolitan Police, however no orders resulted from the trials due to a lack of interior space for traffic police equipment or for passengers. After retirement from demonstration services, the XJS was first donated to the Greater Manchester Police Museum before later being handed to the Jaguar Daimler Heritage Trust, with whom it would become an exhibit vehicle at the British Motor Museum in Gaydon, Warwickshire.

=== XJR-S ===
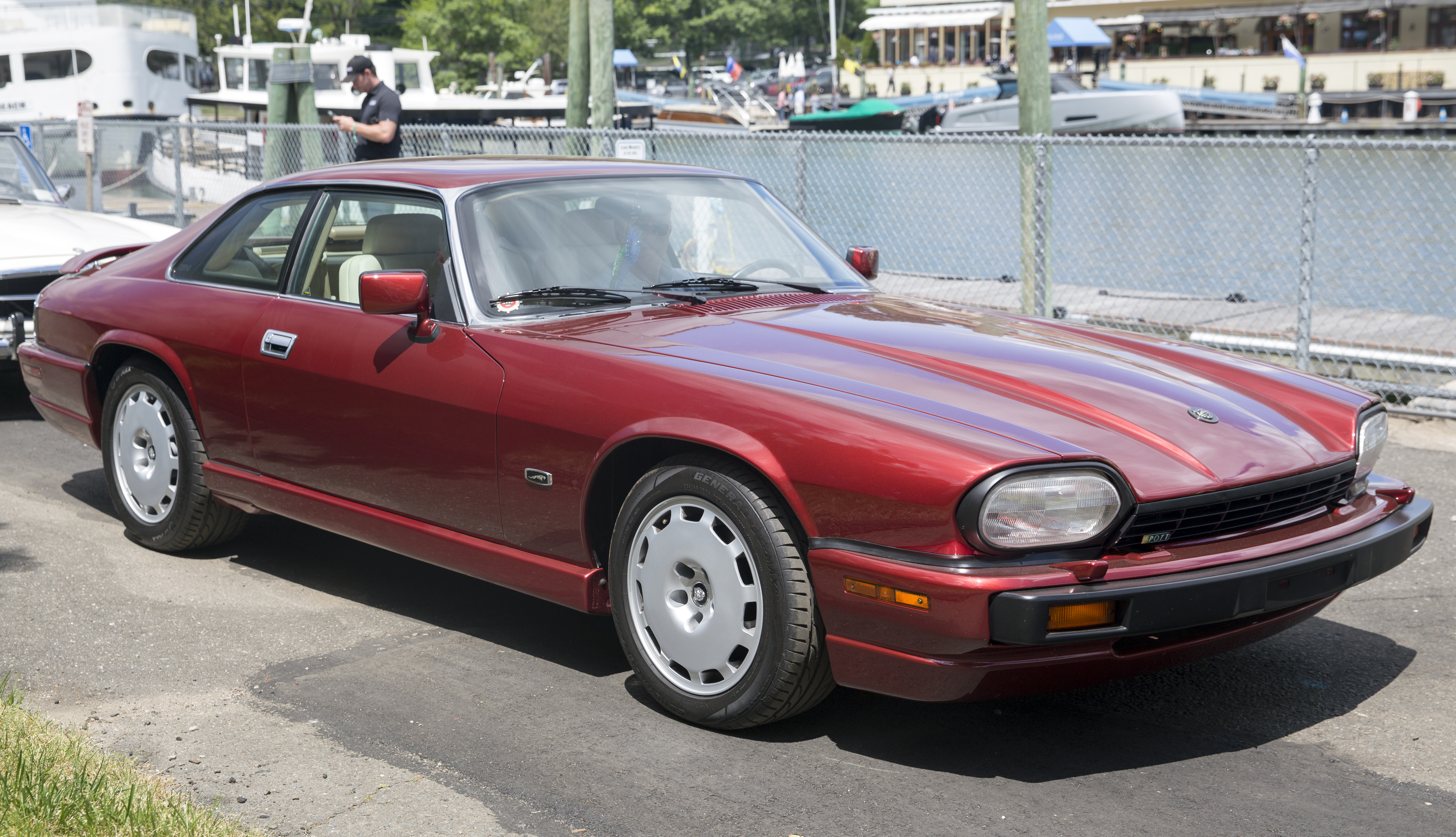
1993 JaguarSport XJR-S

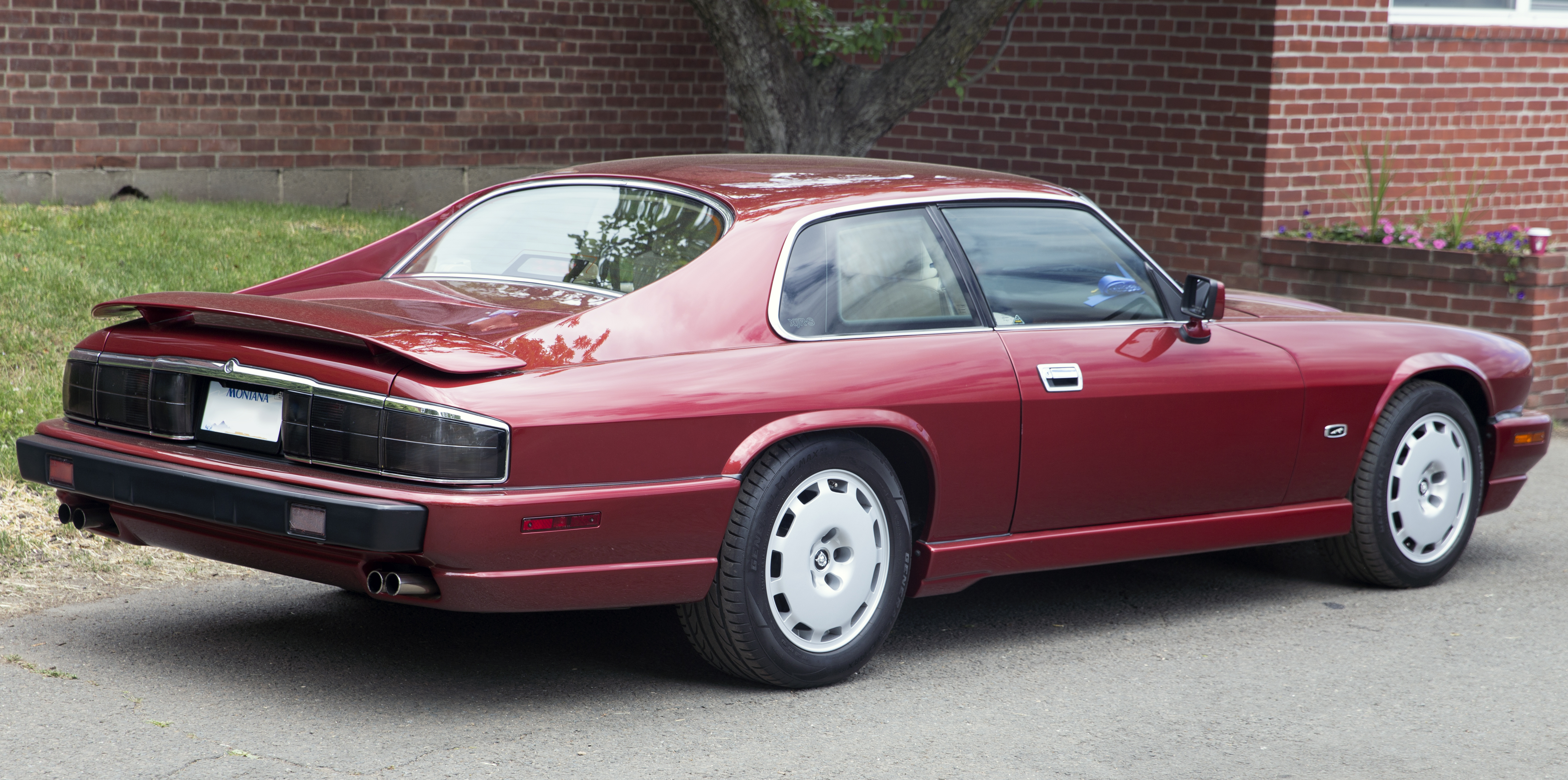
1993 JaguarSport XJR-S rear

From 1988 to 1993, a special high performance XJR-S version equipped with the 5.3 litres (5,344 cc) HE V12 engine was produced by the newly formed JaguarSport, a separate company owned in a ratio of 50:50 by Jaguar and TWR Group Limited specialising in developing high performance Jaguar sports cars. The car had a distinctive body kit, special 15" alloy wheels, 235/60R15 Pirelli P600 tyres, a unique suspension system utilising modified coil springs and Bilstein shocks, a luxurious interior with Connolly Autolux leather along with walnut wood trim, and handling improvements. The first 100 of these cars were named "Celebration Le Mans" to commemorate Jaguar's 1988 win at the 24 Hours of Le Mans and were only sold in the UK. Between 1988 and 1989, a total of 326 XJR-S cars were produced with the 5.3 litres (5,344 cc) engine which has a power output of 318 hp (237 kW). After September 1989, the displacement of the engine was increased to 5,993 cc (6.0 L) and it was now equipped with Zytek fuel injection and engine management system. This was different from the standard 6.0-litre engine used in the late XJS models and was unique to this model. The power output was raised to 333 PS (328 hp; 245 kW) at 5,250 rpm and 495 N⋅m (365 lb⋅ft) of torque at 3,650 rpm due to a higher compression ratio of 11.0:1, a new forged steel crankshaft, increased bore and forged alloy pistons. A modified air intake system and a low loss dual exhaust system was also standard on the model. The engine was mated to the 3-speed GM400 automatic transmission utilising a recalibrated valve body and had faster shift times. The car was equipped with 16" Dunlop D40 M2 tyres for better grip. These modifications resulted in a top speed of 260 km/h (160 mph). During a comparison test conducted by Motorsport magazine in 1997, the XJR-S outperformed the other competitors which included a BMW 850i, Porsche 928 GT and a Ferrari Mondial.

A total of 787 coupés and 50 convertible cars were built for the world market. In the United States, to commemorate the XJ220 launch in 1992, a limited number of 100 XJR-S coupés and convertibles were produced. Based on the facelift model, these were for the American market only. These included 22 Signal Red coupés, 22 Signal Red convertibles, 22 Jet Black coupés, 27 Jet Black convertibles, 2 Flamenco Red coupés, and the Silver Frost 'Press Cars' of 4 coupés and 1 convertible.

=== Daimler ===
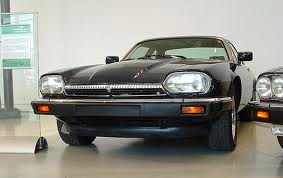
Daimler XJS prototype

Jaguar considered a luxury Daimler version to be marketed as the Daimler-S, notably without the buttresses and with only a single prototype built in 1986. Paul Banham did produce some custom notch back coupés without buttresses, larger rear side windows, and a narrow C-pillars. In the mid-90s, Banham also made a reworked version called the XJSS based on the XJS.

== Facelift (1991–1996) ==
XJS (Facelift)
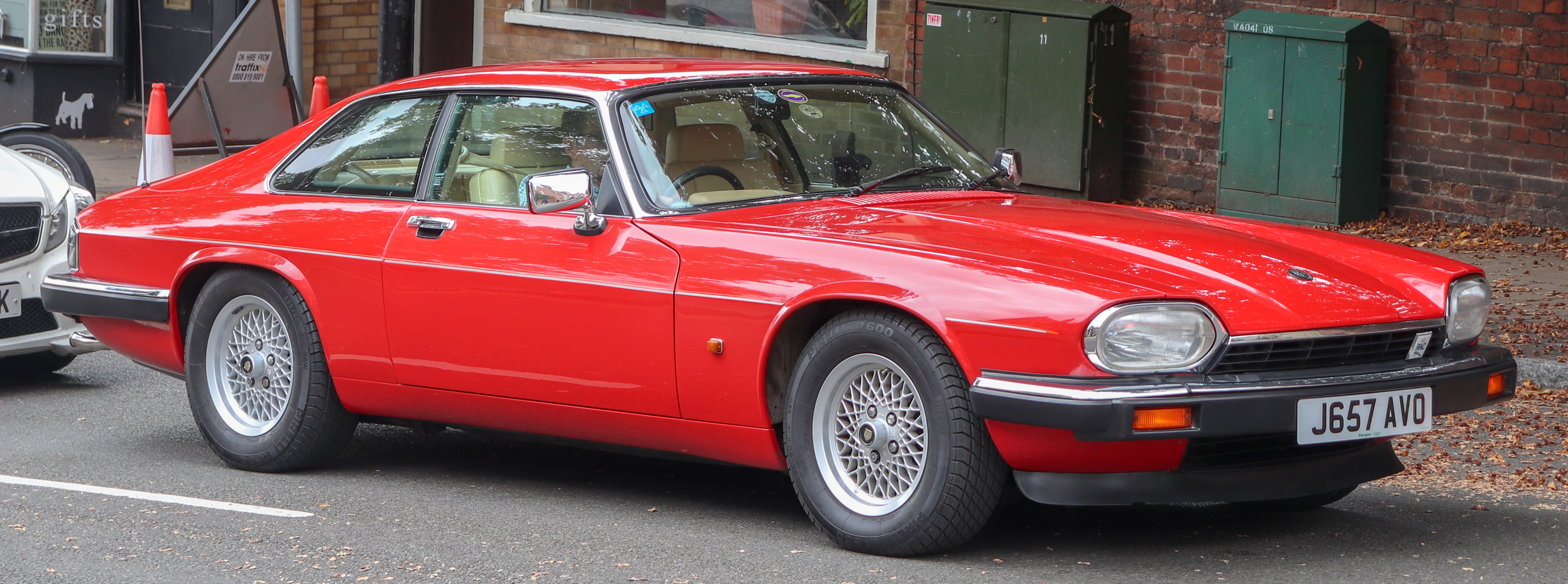
- Facelift (1991 model without revised bumpers)

Overview
- Also called: Jaguar XJS Classic; Jaguar XJR-S
- Production: 1991–1996; 27,406 built

Body and chassis
- Body style: 2-door coupé; 2-door convertible; 2-door 2+2 convertible

Powertrain
- Engine: 4.0 L AJ6 I6; 4.0 L AJ16 I6; 5.3 L HE V12; 6.0 L HE V12
- Transmission: 5-speed manual; 4-speed ZF 4HP24E automatic; 3-speed GM TH400 automatic (V12); 4-speed GM 4L80E automatic (V12)

Dimensions
- Wheelbase: 102.0 in (2,591 mm)
- Length: 191.2 in (4,856 mm)
- Width: 1991–1993: 70.6 in (1,793 mm); 1994–1996: 74.1 in (1,882 mm)
- Height: 48.7 in (1,237 mm)

The XJS was relaunched in its final form in May 1991 under Ford Motor Company's new ownership, as a division of its Premier Auto Group. Ford dropped the model name's hyphen, marketing it as the XJS. By removing the frames, the rear side windows appeared enlarged despite having identical glass apertures as the earlier cars, the windscreen was flush fitting, while the buttresses remained – somewhat minimised by the new side window trim. Designer Geoff Lawson noted the buttresses were part of the car's character. The rear fascia and trunk lid were redesigned, with new black tinted rear lights being fitted. The V12 engine was also upgraded with new injection and fuel system, new spark plugs, and a tidier engine bay. Power for the catalyzed, European-market version inched up from 273 to 280 PS (201 to 206 kW; 269 to 276 bhp).

The car received a new 4.0-litre version of the AJ6 straight-six engine. In 1992, a convertible model having the same engine was added to the range. The V12 engine's capacity was enlarged to 6.0 litres in May 1992 and it had a power output of 227 kW (304 hp). With the introduction of the 6.0-litre V12, the transmission was also updated to a GM 4L80E with a fourth-gear overdrive, whilst the automatic 4.0-litre models continued with the electronic ZF4HP24E transmission. A 2+2 convertible was also introduced, as was a customised insignia line. At the same time, the car received more aerodynamic front and rear bumpers that were now painted the same colour as the body. The main interior change was to the instrument pack; the original featured distinctive drum type ancillary gauges; this was replaced by a more conventional style binnacle similar to that found in the XJ40 saloon. Outboard rear brakes replaced the more complicated inboard brakes of previous models from May 1993.

In April 1994, substantial revisions were made to the 4.0-litre AJ6 engine, which was now equipped with coil-on-plug ignition and given the new code name AJ16. In 1995, the final specification changes were made and the car was referred to as the Celebration model, to celebrate the 60th year of Jaguar Cars. Celebration cars feature diamond turned wheels, Jaguar embossed seats, and a wooden steering wheel.

The XJS was discontinued in 1996, after 21 years in production, superseded by the XK8, which continued to use a modified version of the XJS platform until 2005.

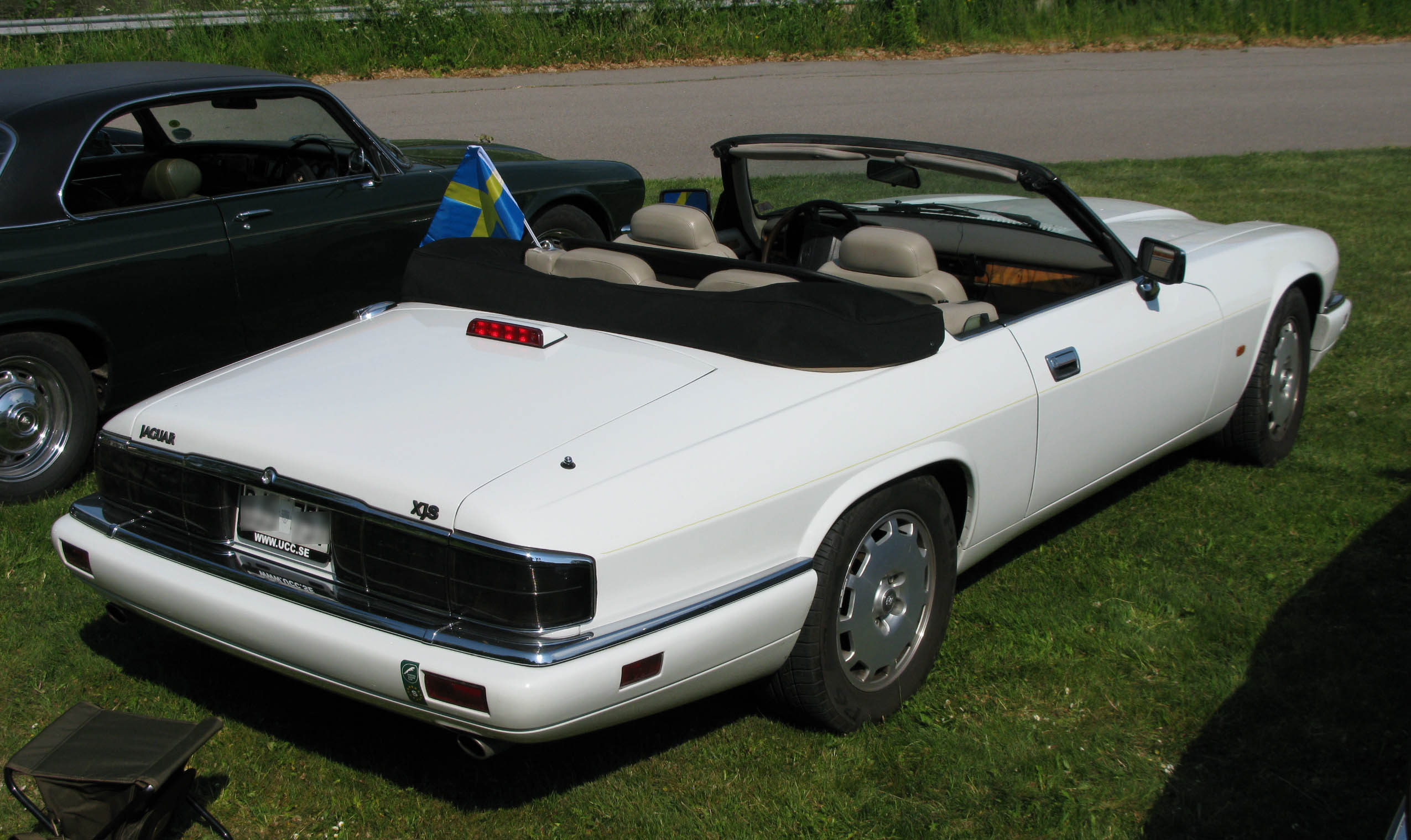
Facelift (post-1991) XJS convertible; note revised rear lights and bumpers

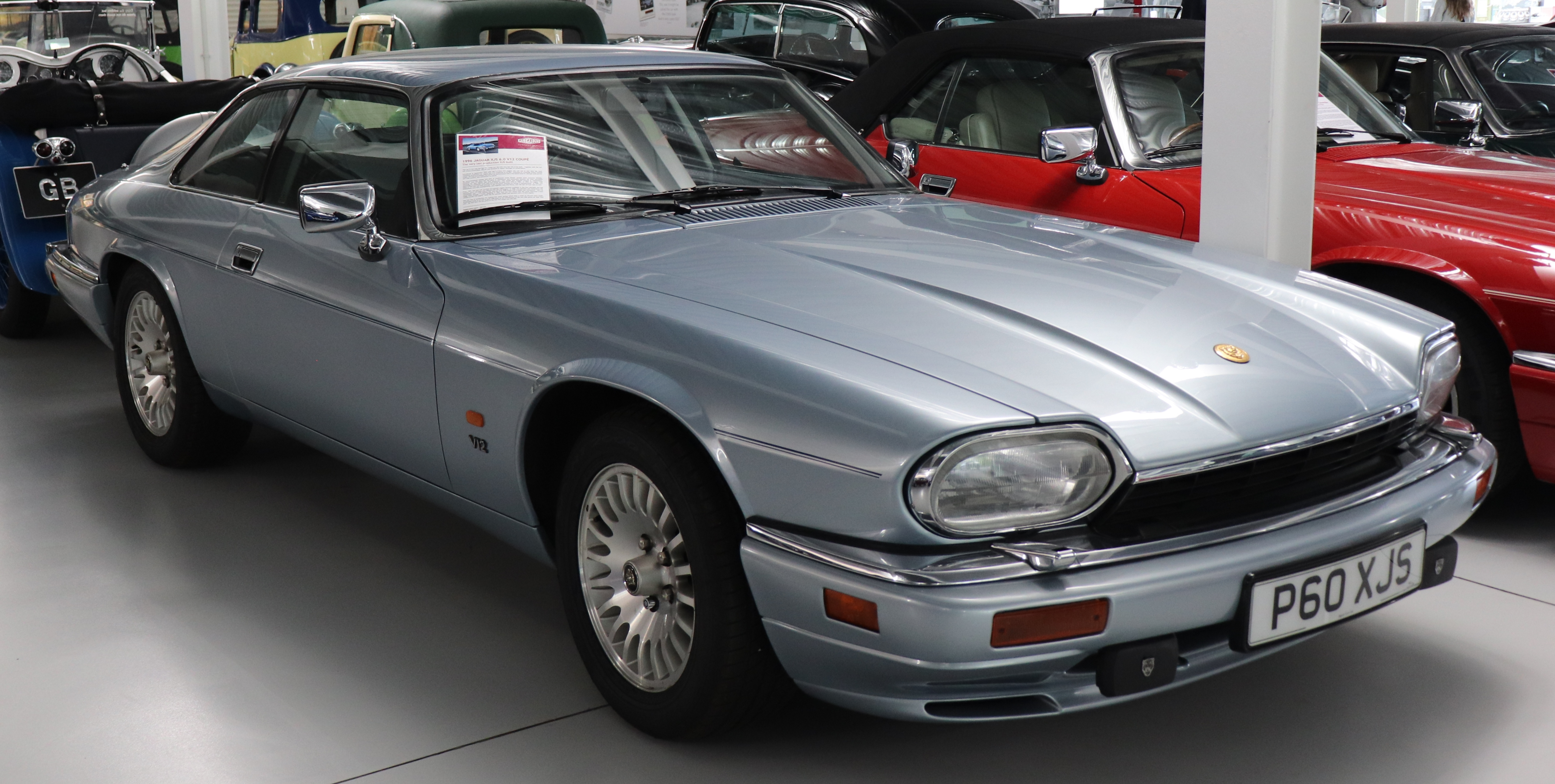
Facelift (post-1991) XJS 6.0 in profile view; note revised side windows and bumpers

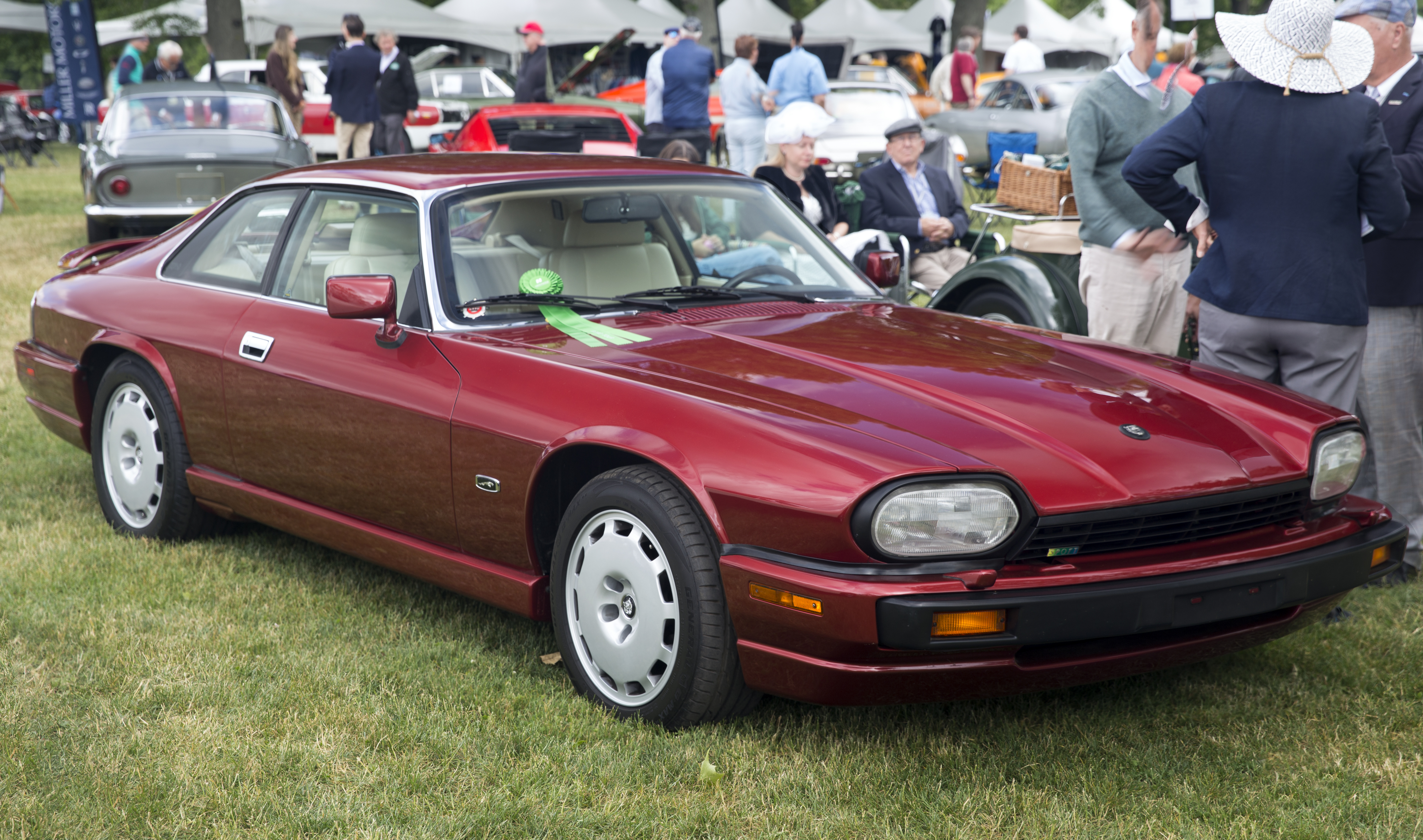
1993 JaguarSport XJR-S (US; facelift model)

== Aftermarket modifications ==
=== TWR XJS ===
Tom Walkinshaw Racing (TWR) formed JaguarSport in partnership with Jaguar in 1988. XJR-S was their first model. But prior to 1988, specifically between 1984 and 1988, TWR offered sporting versions of XJS coupe and cabriolet cars. Various bodywork, trim and engine upgrade options were available on both the 3.6 litre 6-cylinder and 5.3 litre V12 vehicles. These cars are particularly unique and rare, often misinterpreted and misunderstood due to the poor record keeping for the pre-1988 cars. Further confusion is caused by the production of later XJR-S "JaguarSport" cars to similar specifications.

Some of the known upgrades included engine and transmission, low drag body kit, special bumper kit (for North American market), 8"x16" low drag Speedline Italian made alloy wheels fitted with "TWR" centre cap (very similar to later XJR-S wheels fitted with "Sport" centre cap), TWR suspension kit, TWR brake kit, TWR steering wheel, manual gearbox (5-speed close ratio), automatic gearbox quick shift kit, automatic gearshift lever (screw on leather type as used on XJR-S), TWR power assisted steering valve and others.

TWR body kits included a rear spoiler with a distinctive hole for radio antenna on the right hand side. It was also shaped differently than later XJR-S spoilers as it stood higher and had more distinctive flaps on the sides.

The fibreglass side mouldings (side skirts) were equipped with rubber seams.

Front bumper modifications included removal of the chrome and reinforcing front air dam and rear bumper featured exhaust exit apertures and rear integrated fog lights.

=== Lynx Eventer ===
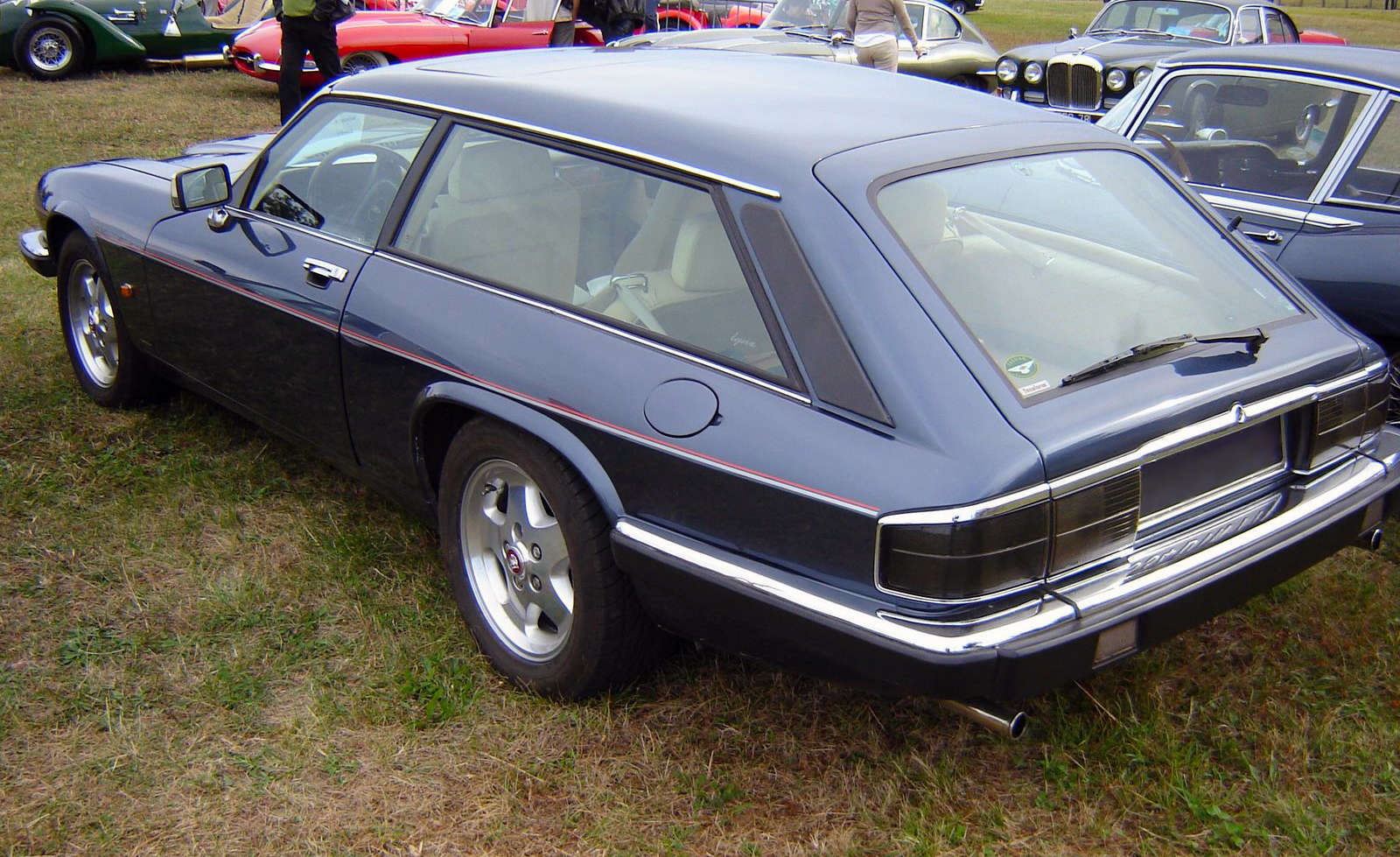
Lynx Eventer

A number of XJS's were modified by coachbuilders Lynx to create a three-door shooting brake, marketed as the Lynx Eventer. Records suggest that 52 pre-facelift XJ-S, and 15 post-facelift XJS, were adapted, with 18 being left hand drive and 49 being right hand drive.

=== Lister-Jaguar XJS ===
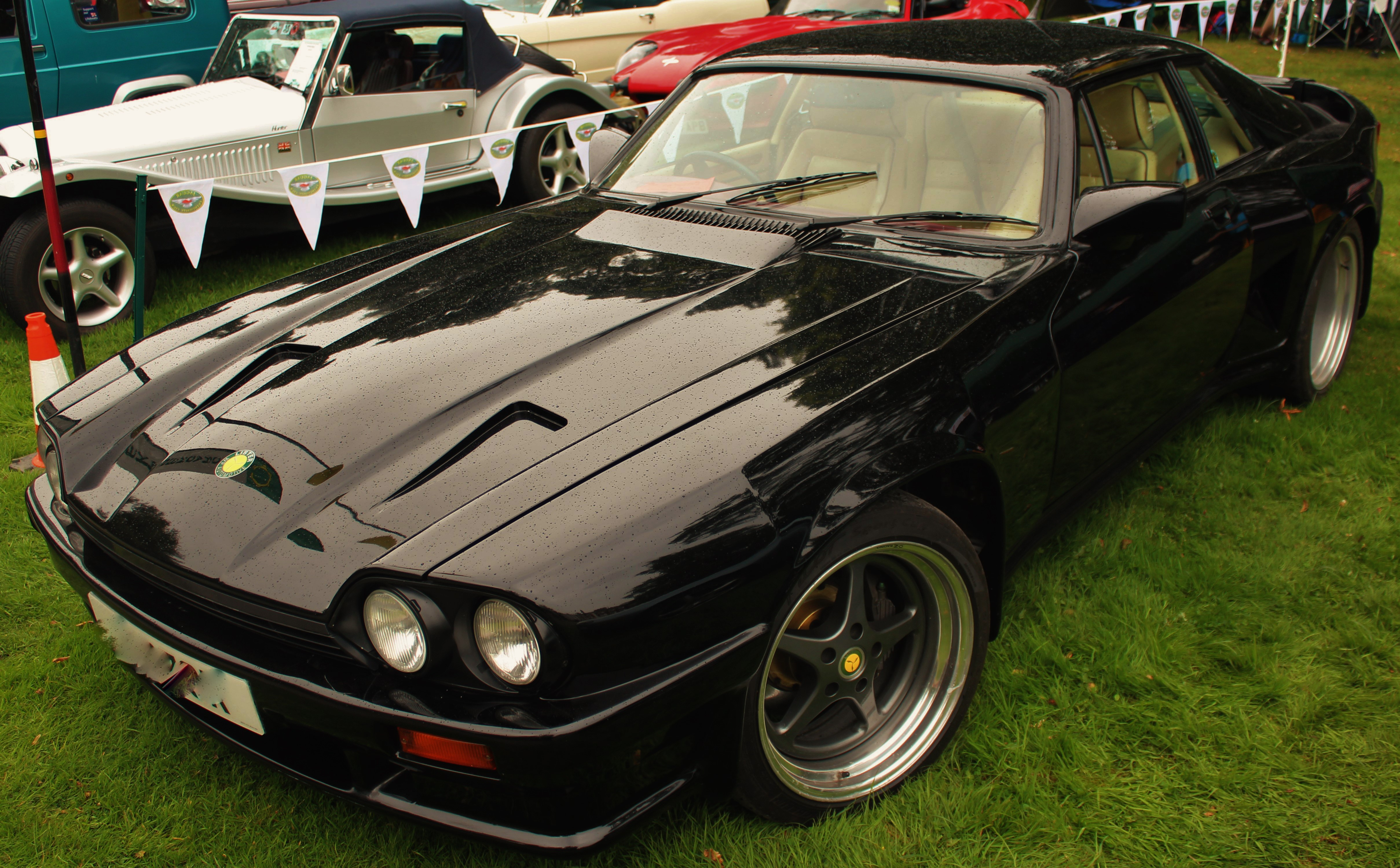
A Lister-Jaguar XJS

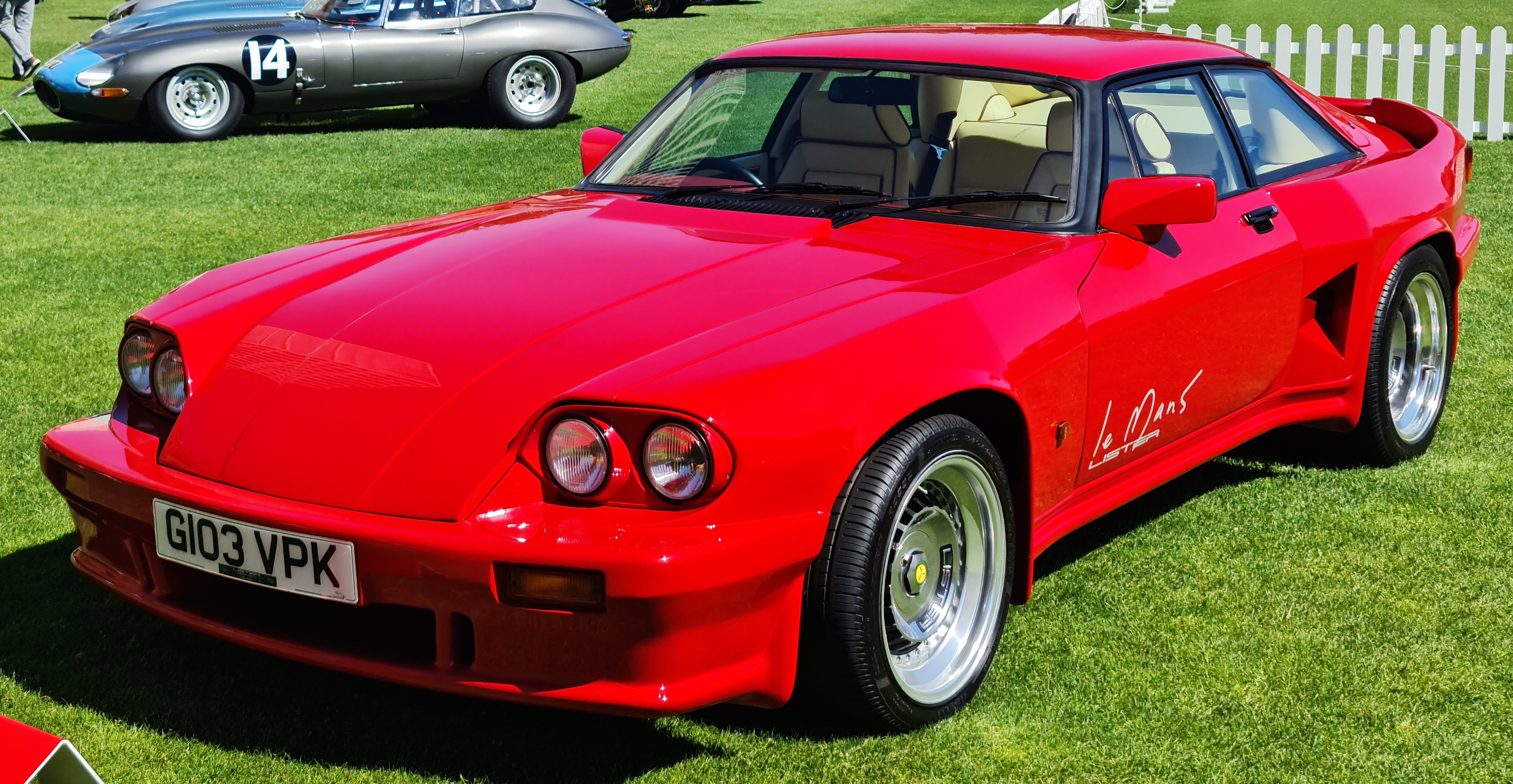
1990 Lister-Jaguar XJS Le Mans

In 1986, the newly-formed Lister Cars, under the leadership of engineer Laurence Pearce, began offering a high performance package for the Jaguar XJS. The cars were sold as Lister-Jaguar and 90 customer cars in total were converted. Lister teamed up with two manufacturers namely WP Automotive and BLE Automotive to carry out the conversion process. The standard package included increased engine displacement to 7.0-litres, a modified fuel injection system with four additional injectors and throttle bodies, larger engine valves along with connecting rods manufactured by Cosworth, a new crankshaft, new cylinder heads, new inlet and exhaust valves, new bearing caps, and a new body kit featuring a spoiler at the rear with a modified rear light clusters and flared wheel arches to accommodate the wide tyres. The modified suspension system featured Koni dampers having 30% stiffer rebound than the original and having a modified rear subframe arrangement with wishbones and radius arms relocated to provide greater triangulation and reduce axle tramp. The new shocks were 100% stiffer at the front and 50% stiffer at the rear. The braking system had ventilated brake discs and were moved outward for better cooling and stability. The interior was also modified and now had Recaro racing bucket seats and a new steering wheel with optimised feedback. The modified engine was rated at 496 bhp (370 kW) and 500 lb⋅ft (678 N⋅m) of torque. The engine was mated to a 5-speed Getrag manual transmission. The cars were fitted with 17-inch wheels with wide Pirelli tyres measuring 10 inches at the front and 13 inches at the rear. Performance figures include a 0-97 km/h (60 mph) acceleration time of 4.5 seconds and a top speed of 200 mph (322 km/h).

Some customers chose to have their cars further modified with the addition of the Le Mans package. The package included a 6-speed Getrag manual transmission, a new exhaust system, and twin-superchargers over the standard package applied in order to extract a power output of 604 bhp (450 kW) from the engine.

=== XJS Monaco ===
Under license from Jaguar build by Paul Bailey Design. The Sultan of Brunei is said to have purchased two of the 11 cars completed.

== Motorsport ==
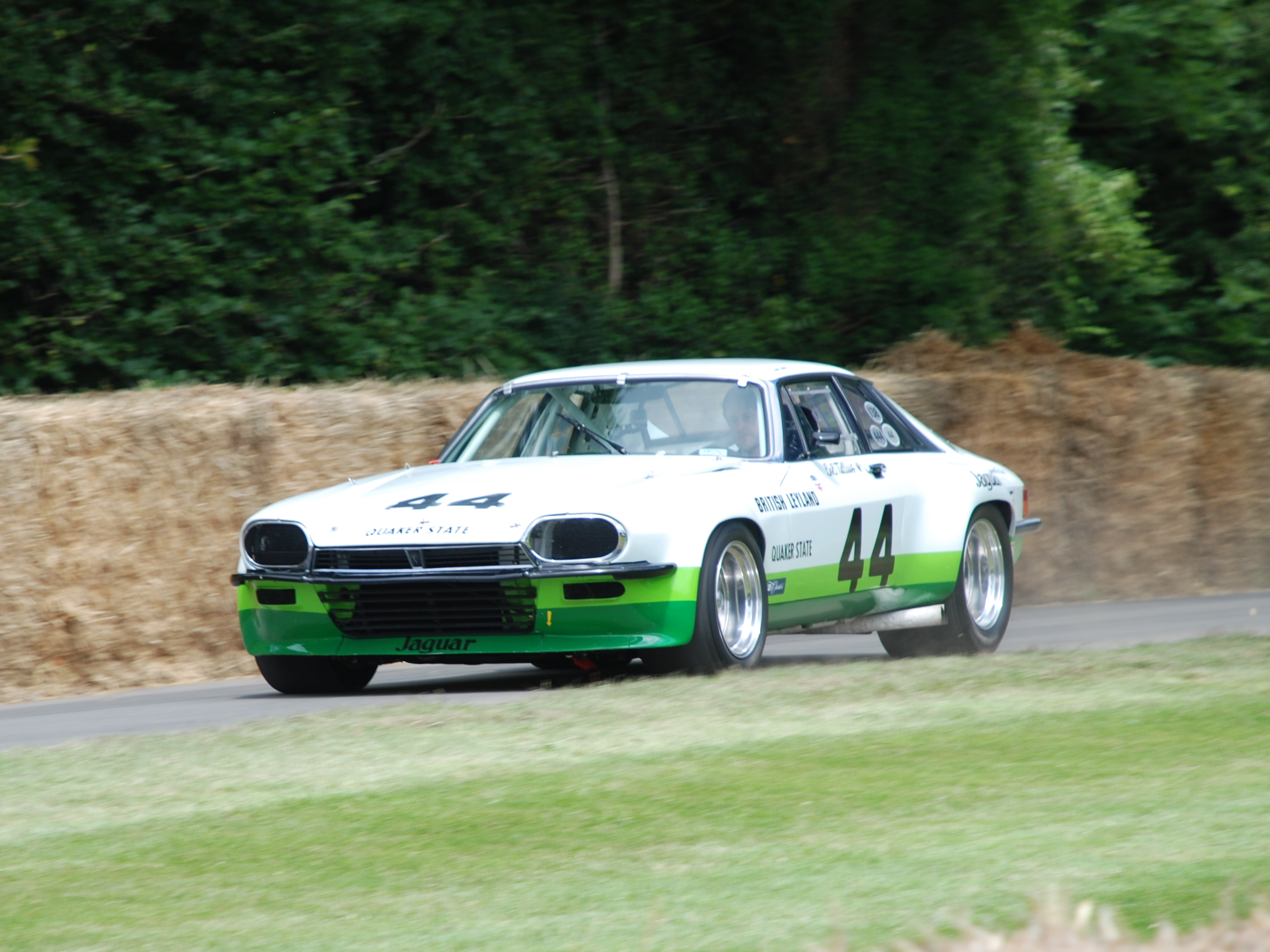
A Jaguar XJS competition car of Group 44 at the 2016 Goodwood Festival of Speed

For 1977, the "Group 44" racing team had a very successful season in Trans Am with a race car based on the actual production XJ-S chassis and running gear. The team won the series' 1977 drivers' championship cup for Bob Tullius but missed winning the manufacturer's title by two points (only one Jaguar was competing in the Trans-Am series compared to many more Porsche entrants). In 1978, a purpose-built tube-frame "silhouette" style XJS race car was constructed which greatly reduced the weight compared to the full production chassis car campaigned in 1977. This silhouette car had only the production car's roof panel as the sole piece of factory XJS sheetmetal on the car. Group 44 succeeded in again capturing the driver's championship for Bob Tullius and also captured the manufacturer's title as well, by entering Brian Fuerstenau driving the 1977 car at some venues to gain additional manufacturer's points for Jaguar. The silhouette car survived and has surfaced recently in the SVRA historic sports race series. The 1977 factory chassis race car is believed to still be in the hands of Group 44's Bob Tullius.

In April 1979 a Jaguar XJS driven by Dave Heinz and Dave Yarborough was entered into Cannonball Baker Sea-to-Shining-Sea Memorial Trophy Dash, widely known simply as the Cannonball Run. They completed the 4,608 kilometres (2,863 mi) from New York to Los Angeles in a record time of 32 hours and 51 minutes, a record that stood for 4 years, until it was beaten by David Diem and Doug Turner in a Ferrari 308. Diem and Turner covered the same distance in 32 hours and 7 minutes on the US Express, an unofficial successor to the Cannonball Run.

=== Tom Walkinshaw Racing ===
British Leyland had approached Tom Walkinshaw's TWR in 1981 with the goal of identifying the BL car which would be best suited to race under FIA's new, Group A touring car rules in the European Touring Car Championship. Walkinshaw hit upon the XJS, rather than the Rover 3500 that BL wanted to use, as its double wishbone suspension would allow it to fit the widest possible wheels under the Group A regulations. British Leyland was still smarting from the failure of the XJC racing programme in 1977 and opted not to provide factory backing for the new effort. TWR moved forward with the project, depending on outside sponsors like Akai and Motul instead, although Jaguar did provide some engineering support.

The XJS won its first race that season when Walkinshaw and Chuck Nicholson won the XIV Grand Prix Brno, the cars simply proving too fast for their rival BMW 530/530i and Alfa Romeo GTV6 opposition with Walkinshaw qualifying 5.37 seconds faster than anyone else on the 10.925 km (6.789 mi) Brno Circuit. After more victories for the team's Jaguars in 1983 (including lapping the 20.81 km (12.93 mi) Nürburgring Nordschleife circuit in 7:56.00), the TWR Jaguars were the cars to beat in the ETCC, with Walkinshaw claiming the 1984 ETCC Drivers' Championship. During the championship season the TWR Jaguar team also won the prestigious Spa 24 Hours race with an XJS driven by Walkinshaw, Hans Heyer and Win Percy, proving not only the speed of the cars but the reliability of the 5.3 litre V12 engine. By 1984 the TWR Jaguars had a new challenger in the ETCC. The turbocharged Volvo 240T run by Eggenberger Motorsport arrived on the scene and had the speed to match the V12, though with turbocharging new to touring car racing it took a number of races for reliability to match the cars' speed.

By the end of 1984 the TWR developed V12 engines in the XJS were rated at approximately 450 hp (340 kW).

By 1985 the XJS had been retired from European competition and TWR was committed to running the 3.5L V8 Rover Vitesse in the ETCC. Walkinshaw had been to the 1984 James Hardie 1000 at the Mount Panorama Circuit in Bathurst, Australia, to co-drive a locally developed Australian Group C XJS with Australian driver John Goss. Walkinshaw qualified in provisional 7th place with a 2:16.09 lap of the 6.172 km (3.835 mi) circuit, recording a top speed of 180 mph (290 km/h) on the 2 km long Conrod Straight, with the promise of more to come in the "Hardies Heroes" Top 10 runoff through the use of special tyres. However, the tyres failed to arrive at the circuit in time and Walkinshaw eventually qualified 10th having to use front wheels on the car as no suitable rubber was available. Clutch failure saw the car fail to get off the start line and a helpless Walkinshaw was hit from behind by a Chevrolet Camaro Z28, causing the car's instant retirement and the race's first ever restart after the track was blocked at the start/finish line.

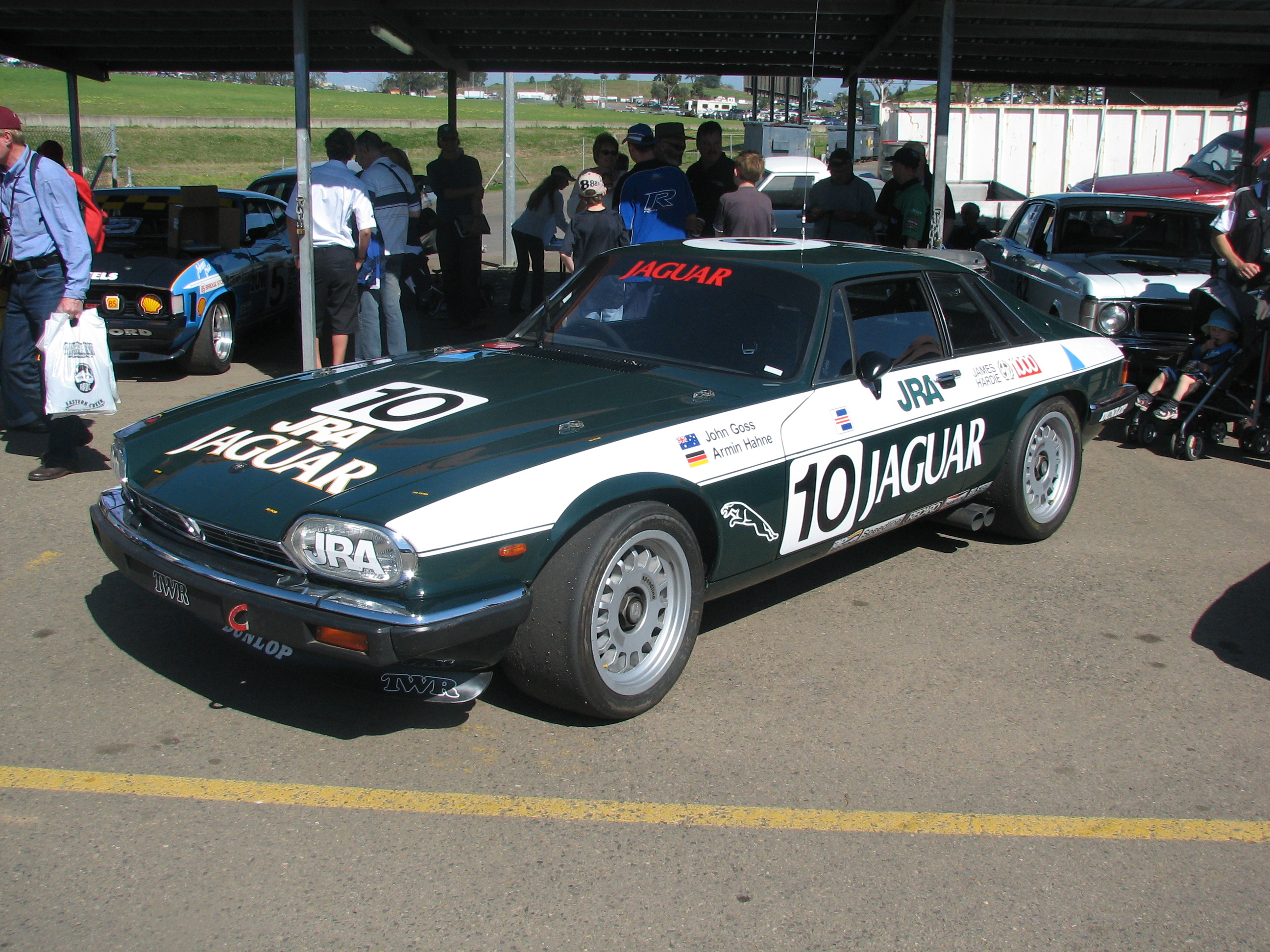
John Goss and Armin Hahne won the 1985 James Hardie 1000 at Bathurst driving a Jaguar XJ-S

The Scot was determined to come back in 1985 and win the race in the first season of Group A in Australia and in 1985 the three TWR XJS Jaguars were brought out of retirement for the James-Hardie 1000. The cars were clearly the class of the field, finishing Hardies Heroes in 1st (Walkinshaw/Percy in #8), 2nd (Jeff Allam/Ron Dickson in #9) and 6th (Goss/Armin Hahne in #10). This time the cars got off the start line and Walkinshaw and Percy dominated most of the race, only losing the lead to the Goss/Hahne car during pit stops (the Allam/Dickson car went out on lap 3 with engine failure). The drivers of the #10 car, who had to battle a broken seat which was held loosely in place by straps and cable ties for well over 100 laps, sat in second most of the way until a split oil line late in the race cost the Walkinshaw/Percy car 3 laps and any chance of victory. 1974 Bathurst 1000 winner Goss won his second "Great Race" while Hahne, who had won the Group A category in the 1984 race driving a TWR Rover, maintained his 100% record with his only Bathurst 1000 win. After having the oil line replaced, Walkinshaw resumed in 4th place but easily caught and passed the JPS Team BMW 635 CSi of 1985 Australian Touring Car Champion Jim Richards in the last laps to make it a Jaguar 1–3, with Walkinshaw following Goss across the finish line in a formation finish.

The TWR XJS Jaguars were next seen late in 1986 at the Fuji 500 in Japan in what was meant to be its Group A swansong as it ran out of FIA homologation in at the end of the year. Against old foes in the BMW 635 CSi and Volvo 240T, as well as newer Group A cars such as the Australian Holden VK Commodore SS Group A V8 and the turbocharged Nissan Skyline DR30 RS, Walkinshaw qualified the XJS on pole, proving how competitive the car could still be in Touring car racing (the cars had been entered in the 1986 Bathurst 1000 and had undergone testing and development which gave a reported an extra 37 kW (50 hp), though the car ultimately did not race due to a lack of funding from Jaguar Rover Australia to help with freight costs). The Fuji race saw the Walkinshaw/Percy car lead the race until retiring on lap 6 with no oil pressure after easily holding off the 313 kW (420 hp) Holden Commodore of Peter Brock on the circuit's 1.5 km (0.93 mi) main straight, while the Hahne/Denny Hulme/Walkinshaw car only lasted until half distance before retiring with a broken differential.

Despite not being eligible for Group A racing in 1987, TWR ran their two Jaguars in the 1987 (January) Nissan Mobil 500 in Wellington, New Zealand under special invitation from the race promoters. Neither car finished with Walkinshaw/Percy suffering diff failure and the Hahne/Hulme car cutting a tyre resulting in a race ending crash after fighting their way into the lead. The cars then raced at Pukekohe, with Percy/Hahne giving the big cat a second-place finish in its final race behind the Perkins Engineering Holden Commodore VK of Australian drivers Larry Perkins and David Parsons.

TWR built a total of 7 cars.

=== Non TWR ===
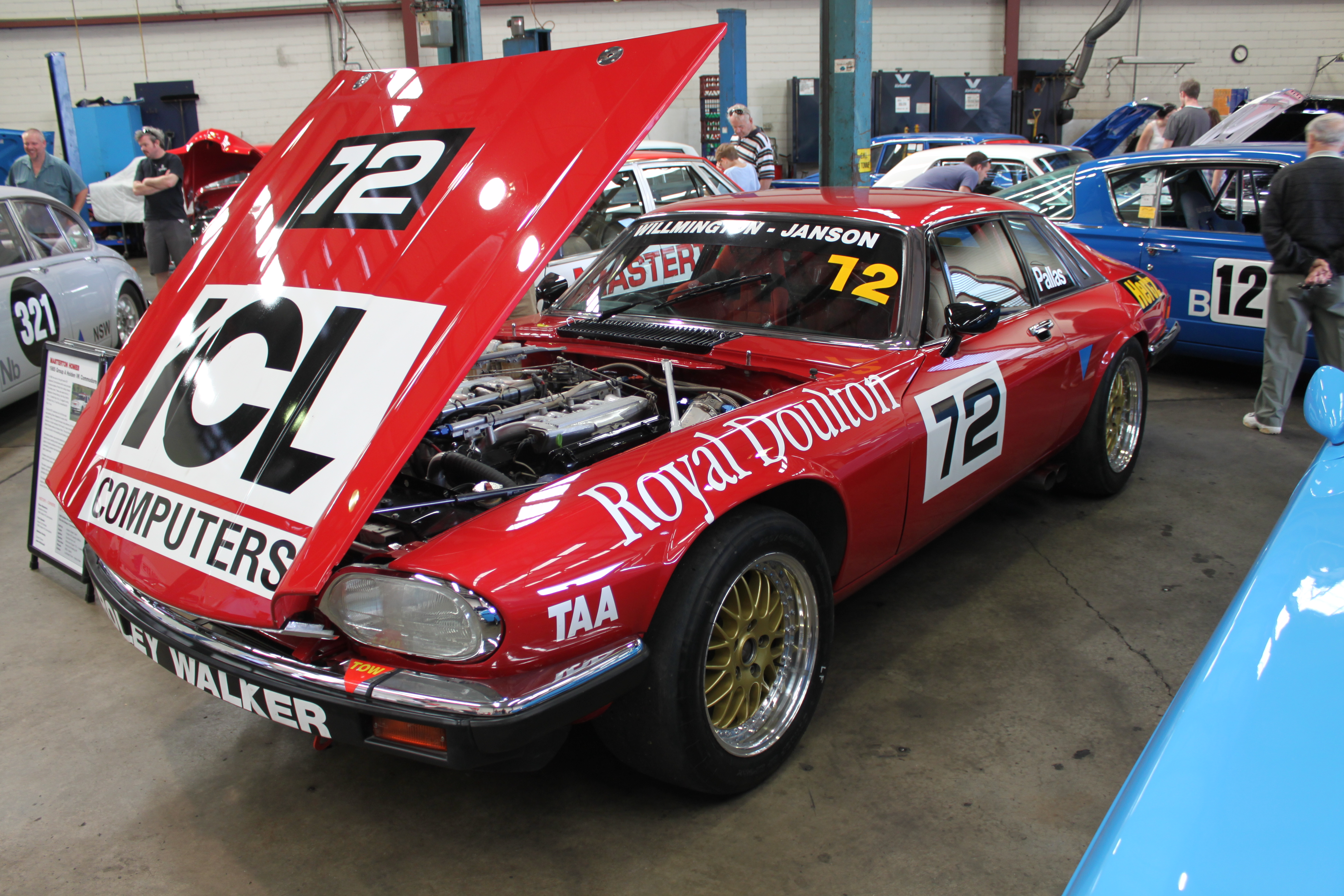
The Jaguar XJS of Gary Wilmington

Sydney based Australian privateer Garry Willmington ran an XJS (reportedly a second hand road car) in the 1985 and 1986 Australian Touring Car Championships, and also the late season endurance races. While he reportedly had obtained more power from the V12 than TWR, Willmington didn't have TWR's resources to develop either the car or engine reliability and results were not forthcoming, though on occasions where the track had a long enough straight (such as Sandown Raceway in Melbourne or the Adelaide International Raceway), the Willmington Jag was usually the fastest car in a straight line. John Goss also ran his own privately entered XJS in the 1986 James Hardie 1000 after Jaguar-Rover Australia pulled its backing of the proposed TWR return to Bathurst due to a severe downturn in the Australian car market forced him to defend his crown alone, though he did receive some technical assistance from TWR. Electrical problems in the race saw Goss finish 24th with veteran Australian driver Bob Muir. Goss's car was his former Group C Jaguar converted to Group A specification.

Willmington did produce some good results from his privateer effort with the V12 Jag. He took pole position and won the opening 5 lap heat of the 1986 AMSCAR series at his home track of Amaroo Park, a very tight, 1.93 km (1.20 mi) long circuit which was the shortest top level road racing circuit in Australia and one that was arguably the worst track in the country for a 500 bhp, 1,400 kg (3,086.5 lb) Jaguar with the longest straight on the circuit not even allowing Willmington to get into his top gears.

Today, the XJS continues to be extensively used in club level motorsport in the United Kingdom and elsewhere. The Jaguar Championship, launched in 2001 by the Jaguar Enthusiasts' Club, allows the XJS to be used, with different classes applicable based on a vehicle's level of modification.

== Diecast Models ==
- The original coupé was modelled by Corgi Toys.
- A 1/40 scale model of the convertible was made in China
- The Lynx Eventer was modelled by PRX/IXO
- A 1/18 scale 1975 XJ-S coupé was modelled by Yatming, as part of their 'Road Signature' series
- Autoart produced 1/18 versions of the coupé, convertible and Group A race car that won the 1984 Spa 24 Hour race.
- Oxford produce a 1/76 coupé in a number of colours, including a Return of the Saint and Police car version.
- A 1/64 scale model by Hot Wheels, portraying a US-spec version.
