= Chicago Motor Speedway =

Motorsport track in Cicero, Illinois, US

Chicago Motor Speedway at Sportsman's Park
- Oval (1999–2003)
- Location: Cicero, Illinois
- Coordinates: 41°49′50″N 87°44′55″W
- Capacity: 67,000
- Owner: Charles W. Bidwill III, Chip Ganassi and Dwayne Mcarthur
- Broke ground: 1997
- Opened: 1999
- Closed: 2003
- Construction cost: US$70 million
- Former names: Sportsman's Park
- Major events: CART (1999–2002); Atlantic Championship (1999, 2001–2002); NASCAR Craftsman Truck Series Sears Craftsman 175 (2000–2001); ASA National Tour (2000–2001); Barber Pro Series (2001); ARCA Truck Series (2001); Indy Lights (1999–2000); NASCAR Midwest Series (2000)

Oval (1999–2003)
- Length: 1.029 mi (1.656 km)
- Race lap record: 0:23.687 (156.390 mph (251.685 km/h)) ( (Brazil) Roberto Moreno, Swift 010.c, 1999, CART)

The Chicago Motor Speedway at Sportsman's Park was a motorsports race track, located in Cicero, Illinois, just outside Chicago. It was built in 1999 by a group including Chip Ganassi, owner of Chip Ganassi Racing. In 2002 the 1.029 mi (1.656 km) oval shaped track suspended operations due to financial conditions in the motorsports industry. The track was also the site of horse races, for which the track was called "Sportsman's Park".

== History ==
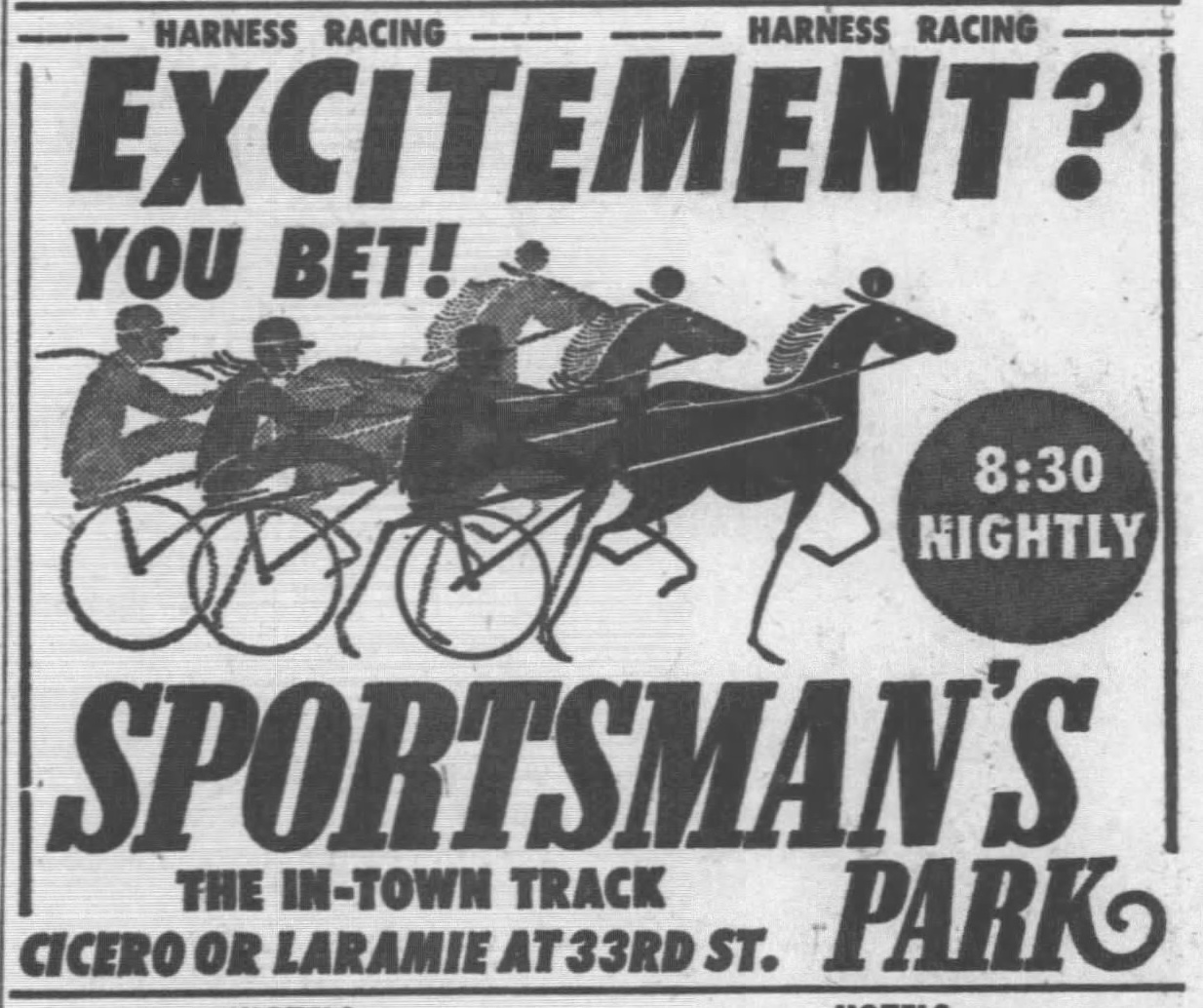
1967 advertisement for Sportsman's Park in the Chicago Tribune

Before 1999, Sportsman's Park was one of the premier locations for horse racing in the area. Hawthorne Race Course, located right across the street to the south from the track, is the current host of the Illinois Derby. The two tracks operated together for decades.

In 1999, after the final season of the old Sportsman's Park, the main grandstand and infield were completely demolished to make way for the massive grandstand that was to follow.

The track held CART races from 1999 to 2002, the Toyota Atlantic Series, and NASCAR Craftsman Truck Series races in 2000 and 2001. Chicago Motor Speedway also held American Speed Association (ASA) races as well as the Mid-Am Racing Series. Traditional horse races remained; this time as dirt was brought in over the racing surface. Problems with the hard surface led to several scratches by trainers and races being canceled.

In 2001, Chicagoland Speedway in Joliet was built in the hopes of attracting more racing fans and upper-level races; all Cicero races were subsequently moved to Joliet and the track closed the following year after the CART event. The few remaining horse races were transferred to Hawthorne.

Portions of the motion picture Driven were shot at Chicago Motor Speedway.

In 2003 the town of Cicero purchased the track for $18 million. During 2005 the main grandstands were torn down but the track itself remained.

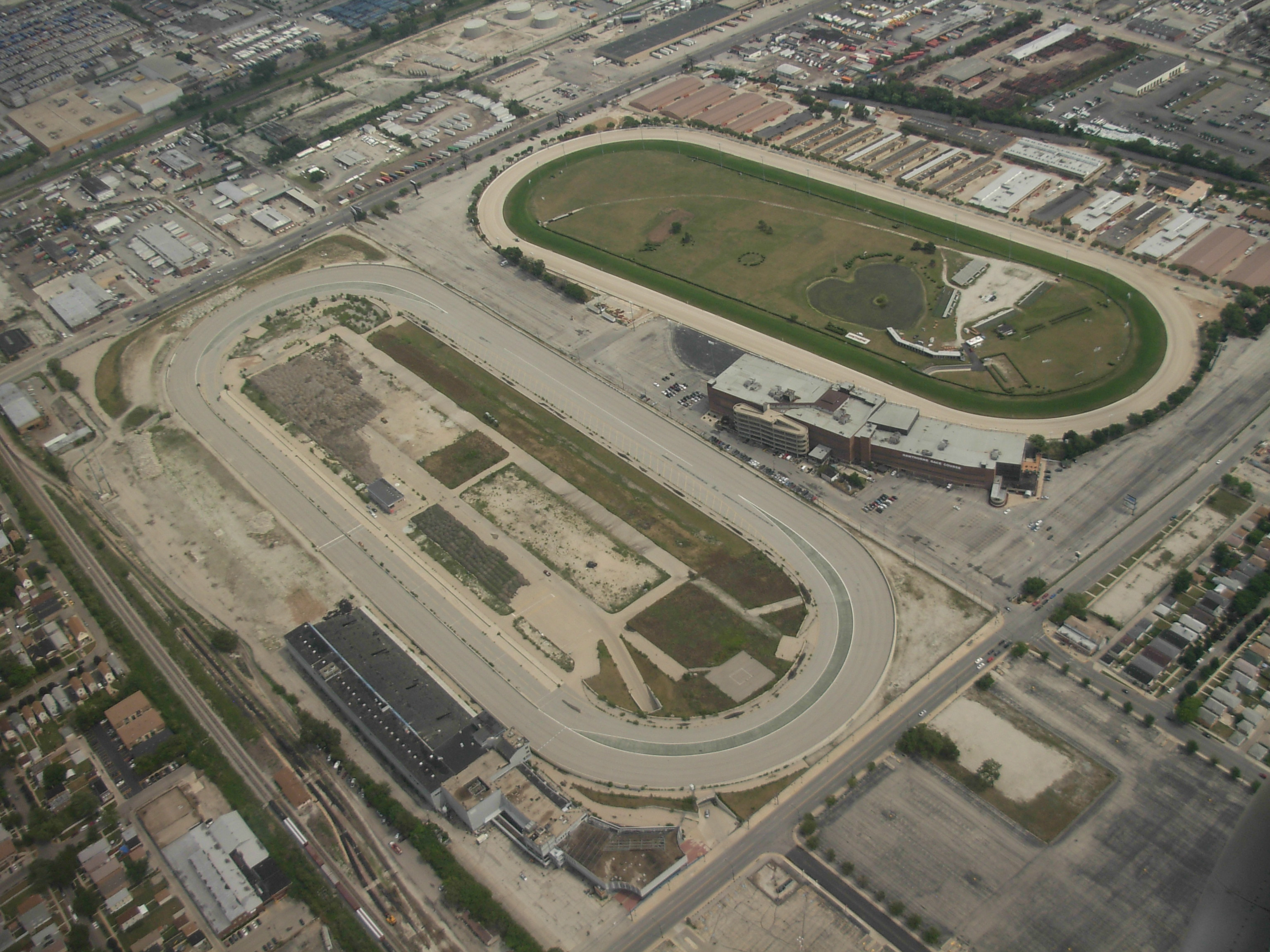
Aerial view of the speedway, after demolition of the grandstand, 2007.

On October 31, 2008, it was reported that contracts for the demolition of the remaining structures and track had been awarded.

Demolition of the remaining Sportsman's Park structures and the track itself began on January 5, 2009.

The western portion of the site is now a Wirtz Beverage Group distribution center, while the eastern portion is home to a Walmart supercenter, effectively removing any last remains of the track. Part of the parking lot to the west across Laramie Avenue has been converted into a public park.

== Past winners ==
=== ARCA Lincoln Welders Truck Series history ===
- 2001 Robbin Slaughter

=== NASCAR Craftsman Truck Series history ===
- 2000 Joe Ruttman
- 2001 Scott Riggs

=== Mid-American Stock Car Series ===
- 1999 Mike Monroe
- 2000 Nate Clatfelter

== Lap records ==
The fastest official race lap records at Chicago Motor Speedway are listed as:

Category	Time	Driver	Vehicle	Event
Oval (1999–2003): 1.029 mi (1.656 km)
CART	0:23.687	Roberto Moreno	Swift 010.c	1999 Target Grand Prix of Chicago
Indy Lights	0:25.723	Scott Dixon	Lola T97/20	2000 Chicago Indy Lights round
Formula Atlantic	0:26.607	Sam Hornish, Jr.	Swift 008.a	1999 Cicero Atlantic round
Barber Pro	0:30.968	Sepp Koster	Reynard 98E	2001 Cicero Barber Pro round
