= 2024 Atlantic Championship =

Motorsport racing series

2024 Atlantic Championship Series season

Season
- Races: 12
- Start date: March 23
- End date: August 18

Awards
- 016 Class Champion Open Class Champion: Matthew Butson; Nathan Byrd

The 2024 Atlantic Championship Series season was the eleventh season of the revived Atlantic Championship. The series was organized by Formula Race Promotions and sanctioned by SCCA Pro Racing.

The season was held over six weekends from March to August 2024. K-Hill Motorsports driver Matthew Butson won the 016 Class Championship during the penultimate weekend of the season, while Arrive Drive Motorsport's Nathan Byrd won the Open Class Championship after going unbeaten throughout the first eight races of the season.

== Drivers ==
Drivers competed in two classes, either in the 016 Class or in the Open Class. All teams were American-registered.

Team	No.	Driver	Car	Rounds
016 Class entries
K-Hill Motorsports	00	(United States) Bill Munholland	2006 Swift 016a	3–4
K-Hill Motorsports	21	(United States) Clay DellaCava	2006 Swift Formula Atlantic 016	1
K-Hill Motorsports	24	(United States) Matthew Butson	2006 Swift 016 Mazda	All
K-Hill Motorsports	63	(United States) Jim Booth	2006 Swift 016 Mazda	1
K-Hill Motorsports	74	(United States) Dudley Fleck	2006 Swift 016 Mazda	1–2, 4
K-Hill Motorsports	77	(United States) John McAleer	2006 Swift 016	1–4
K-Hill Motorsports	666	(Estonia) Tõnis Kasemets	2006 Swift 016a	4
Polestar	29	(United States) David Grant	2006 Swift 016	4–5
Polestar	40	(United States) Keith Grant	2006 Swift 016 Mazda	3–5
Alliance Racing	66	(United States) Richard Zober	2006 Swift 016a Mazda	3–5
Open Class entries
Puma	5	(United States) Robert Wright	2001 Swift 014/FA	3–4
K-Hill Motorsports	06	(United States) Bruce Hamilton	2001 Swift 014 MZR	6
Coopsport	7	(United States) Glenn Cooper	1998 Nova-Diemen F1000	1
Arrive Drive Motorsport	07	(United States) Austin Holtgraewe	2012 JDR F1000	1–2, 4
Arrive Drive Motorsport	33	(United States) Charles Livingston	2013 JDR 012	4, 6
Arrive Drive Motorsport	39	(United States) Nathan Byrd	2012 JDR F1000	1–4
Arrive Drive Motorsport	81	(United States) Tim Pierce	2018 JDR F1000	1–2, 6
Arrive Drive Motorsport	94	(United States) Joel Haas	2000 Piper F1000	1
Arrive Drive Motorsport	99	(United States) Paulie Gatto	2015 JDR F1000	1–4, 6
Slahor Racing	9	(United States) Jason Slahor	2008 Citation F1000	3, 6
Home Tech Consultants	41	(United States) Robert Albani	2004 Mazda PFM	3, 5 (Note: O'Connor and Albani shared the No. 41 car for round 5, with O'Connor driving race 1 and Albani driving race 2.)
Home Tech Consultants	41	(United States) Tyler O'Connor	2004 Mazda PFM	5
Hamilton Motorsports	93	(United States) Steve Hamilton	2020 JDR F1000	2, 4, 6

== Race calendar ==
The schedule of series organizer Formula Race Promotions was announced on October 12, 2023. The race weekends where races of the Atlantic Championship will be held were concretized in early January 2024. The series added a round at New Jersey Motorsports Park, bringing the total up to six events.

Round		Circuit	Date	Support bill	Map of circuit locations
1	R1	(Georgia (U.S. state)) Road Atlanta, Braselton	March 23	SVRA; Trans-Am Series	2024 Atlantic Championship is located in the United States
1	R2	(Georgia (U.S. state)) Road Atlanta, Braselton	March 24	SVRA; Trans-Am Series	2024 Atlantic Championship is located in the United States
2	R1	Mid-Ohio Sports Car Course, Lexington	April 27	FRP race weekend SVRA	2024 Atlantic Championship is located in the United States
2	R2	Mid-Ohio Sports Car Course, Lexington	April 28	FRP race weekend SVRA	2024 Atlantic Championship is located in the United States
3	R1	(Pennsylvania) Pittsburgh International Race Complex, Wampum	June 8	SVRA; Trans-Am Series	2024 Atlantic Championship is located in the United States
3	R2	(Pennsylvania) Pittsburgh International Race Complex, Wampum	June 9	SVRA; Trans-Am Series	2024 Atlantic Championship is located in the United States
4	R1	(Wisconsin) Road America, Elkhart Lake	June 29	International GT; Trans-Am Series	2024 Atlantic Championship is located in the United States
4	R2	(Wisconsin) Road America, Elkhart Lake	June 30	International GT; Trans-Am Series	2024 Atlantic Championship is located in the United States
5	R1	New Jersey Motorsports Park, Millville	July 27	Formula Regional Americas Championship; Formula 4 United States Championship	2024 Atlantic Championship is located in the United States
5	R2	New Jersey Motorsports Park, Millville	July 28	Formula Regional Americas Championship; Formula 4 United States Championship	2024 Atlantic Championship is located in the United States
6	R1	(West Virginia) Summit Point Motorsports Park, Summit Point	August 17	FRP race weekend SVRA	2024 Atlantic Championship is located in the United States
6	R2	(West Virginia) Summit Point Motorsports Park, Summit Point	August 18	FRP race weekend SVRA	2024 Atlantic Championship is located in the United States

== Race results ==
Round		Circuit	016 Class			Open Class		
Round		Circuit	Pole position	Fastest lap	Winning driver	Pole position	Fastest lap	Winning driver
1	R1	(Georgia (U.S. state)) Road Atlanta	(United States) Dudley Fleck	(United States) Matthew Butson	(United States) Dudley Fleck	(United States) Glenn Cooper	(United States) Nathan Byrd	(United States) Nathan Byrd
1	R2	(Georgia (U.S. state)) Road Atlanta		(United States) Matthew Butson	(United States) Matthew Butson		(United States) Nathan Byrd	(United States) Nathan Byrd
2	R1	Mid-Ohio Sports Car Course	(United States) Matthew Butson	(United States) Matthew Butson	(United States) Dudley Fleck	(United States) Nathan Byrd	(United States) Nathan Byrd	(United States) Nathan Byrd
2	R2	Mid-Ohio Sports Car Course	(United States) Matthew Butson	(United States) Matthew Butson	(United States) Matthew Butson	(United States) Nathan Byrd	(United States) Nathan Byrd	(United States) Nathan Byrd
3	R1	(Pennsylvania) Pittsburgh International Race Complex	(United States) Keith Grant	(United States) Matthew Butson	(United States) Matthew Butson	(United States) Nathan Byrd	(United States) Nathan Byrd	(United States) Nathan Byrd
3	R2	(Pennsylvania) Pittsburgh International Race Complex	(United States) Keith Grant	(United States) Keith Grant	(United States) Keith Grant	(United States) Nathan Byrd	(United States) Nathan Byrd	(United States) Nathan Byrd
4	R1	(Wisconsin) Road America	(United States) David Grant	(United States) David Grant	(United States) David Grant	(United States) Steve Hamilton	(United States) Charles Livingston	(United States) Nathan Byrd
4	R2	(Wisconsin) Road America	(United States) David Grant	(Estonia) Tõnis Kasemets	(Estonia) Tõnis Kasemets	(United States) Nathan Byrd	(United States) Charles Livingston	(United States) Nathan Byrd
5	R1	New Jersey Motorsports Park	(United States) Matthew Butson	(United States) David Grant	(United States) David Grant	(United States) Tyler O'Connor	(United States) Tyler O'Connor	(United States) Tyler O'Connor
5	R2	New Jersey Motorsports Park	(United States) David Grant	(United States) Keith Grant	(United States) Matthew Butson	(United States) Robert Albani	(United States) Robert Albani	no classified finishers
6	R1	(West Virginia) Summit Point Motorsports Park	(United States) Matthew Butson	(United States) Matthew Butson	(United States) Matthew Butson	(United States) Bruce Hamilton	(United States) Tim Pierce	(United States) Paulie Gatto
6	R2	(West Virginia) Summit Point Motorsports Park	(United States) Matthew Butson	(United States) Matthew Butson	(United States) Matthew Butson		(United States) Jason Slahor	(United States) Jason Slahor

== Season summary ==
The opening event of the 2024 season was held at Road Atlanta, with eleven cars entered across both classes. K-Hill’s Dudley Fleck and Coopsport’s Glenn Cooper took the pole positions for the 016 and Open Class respectively in the only qualifying session held. While Fleck was able to convert his pole position into a win ahead of his teammates Matthew Butson and John McAleer, Cooper dropped to fourth throughout the race, leaving an all-Arrive Drive Motorsport podium of Nathan Byrd, Tim Pierce and Paulie Gatto. Fleck had to concede race two to Butson, with his teammate Clay DellaCava in third this time, while the podium in the Open Class remained unchanged.

The second round at Mid-Ohio attracted only eight cars, with Butson and Byrd claiming both pole positions in their respective classes. The first race offered an exciting battle for the 016 Class win between Butson and Fleck, with the pair trading top spot before Butson had an engine issue, allowing McAleer into second place. The Open Class saw Byrd take an unrivaled victory ahead of Steve Hamilton (Hamilton Motorsport) and Austin Holtgraewe (Arrive Drive). Race two was a calmer affair as Butson was untroubled this time, leading Fleck and McAleer home. Byrd claimed his fourth win in a row, again ahead of Hamilton, with Gatto, who was unable to start the first race, in third.

Pittsburgh hosted round three for ten entrants, and Polestar’s Keith Grant and Nathan Byrd took double pole positions in their classes. 016 Class leader Butson was the fastest car on track throughout the first race as he overtook Grant to take the win, with Alliance’s Richard Zober in third. Butson tried to repeat this feat in the second race, but this time, Grant was able to hold on to first place. The Open Class saw no new winner once again as Byrd added two more to his win streak. Jason Slahor, racing for his eponymous team, was the only other starter in the first race and also took second in race two, with Gatto once again only starting the second race and coming third.

The second half of the season began at Road America, with entries reaching 14 cars. This time, it was Keith’s brother David Grant who secured two 016 Class pole positions, while privateer Steve Hamilton managed to take one Open Class pole position away from Byrd. David led Keith to a Polestar one-two in the first race, with Fleck in third. Byrd ironed out his qualifying mishap by winning the race, while Hamilton dropped to third behind Byrd’s teammate Charles Livingston. The second race was won by one-off entry Tõnis Kasemets, who beat David Grant, with Butson in third. In the Open Class, Livingston and Hamilton took second and third behind dominator Byrd, now on an eight-race winning streak.

Only six competitors traveled to New Jersey Motorsports Park for round five, where Butson and David Grant shared 016 Class pole positions. They each won a race, albeit not the one they started in first - David Grant took a new lap record en route to leading Butson and Zober home in race one, before he failed to start the second race. That left the podium to Butson, Keith Grant and McAleer, with Butson taking the title in the process. The Open class saw only one car entered, shared between Tyler O’Connor and Robert Albani. The former was unable to finish the first race and the latter won race two. That finally broke Byrd’s win streak while he won the title in absence.

The Open Class season ended in quiet fashion at Summit Point Motorsports Park as class champion Butson was the only entrant. Therefore he took both pole positions and won both races, but also managed to set a new track record during race one. The Open Class saw more of a fight, especially because Byrd was still absent. K-Hill's Bruce Hamilton, who was first in the sole qualifying session, dropped to fifth during the first race, with Gatto taking his first win ahead of Slahor and Pierce. After coming through the field to claim second in race one, Slahor went one better in race two, taking the win and demoting Gatto to second. Pierce came third once again in the final race of 2024.

== Standings ==
=== Scoring system ===
Three points were awarded for pole position in each class, as well as two more points for the fastest lap per race per class.

Position	1st	2nd	3rd	4th	5th	6th	7th	8th	9th	10th	11th	12th	13th	14th	15th	16th	17th	18th	19th	20th	21st	22nd	23rd	24th	25th+
Points	50	42	37	34	31	29	27	25	23	21	19	17	15	13	11	10	9	8	7	6	5	4	3	2	1

Each driver's two worst results were dropped.

=== Drivers' standings ===
Pos	Driver	(Georgia (U.S. state)) ATL		(Ohio) MOH		(Pennsylvania) PIT		(Wisconsin) ROA		(New Jersey) NJM		(West Virginia) SUM		Pts
Pos	Driver	R1	R2	R1	R2	R1	R2	R1	R2	R1	R2	R1	R2	Pts
016 Class standings
1	(United States) Matthew Butson	2	1	**3**†	**1**	1	2	(4)	(3)	**2**	1	**1**	**1**	492
2	(United States) John McAleer	3	4	2	3	4	4	6	6					276
3	(United States) Keith Grant					**2**	**1**	2	4	4	2			254
4	(United States) Dudley Fleck	**1**	2	1	2			3	8					249
5	(United States) Richard Zober					3	3	5	5	3	3			210
6	(United States) David Grant							**1**	**2**	1	**Ret**			155
7	(United States) Bill Munholland					5	5	7	7					116
8	(United States) Clay DellaCava	4	3											71
9	(Estonia) Tõnis Kasemets							Ret	1					53
—	(United States) Jim Booth	DNS	DNS											0
Open Class standings
1	(United States) Nathan Byrd	1	1	**1**	**1**	**1**	**1**	1	**1**					427
2	(United States) Paulie Gatto	3	3	DNS	3	DNS	3	4	4			1	2	308
3	(United States) Steve Hamilton			2	2			**3**	3			4	5	226
5	(United States) Jason Slahor					2	2					2	1	178
4	(United States) Austin Holtgraewe	5	4	3	4			5	DNS					167
6	(United States) Tim Pierce	2	2	DNS	DNS							3	3	160
7	(United States) Charles Livingston							2	2			6	4	151
8	(United States) Tyler O'Connor									**1**	DNS			55
9	(United States) Robert Albani					DNS	4			DNS	**Ret**			40
10	(United States) Glenn Cooper	**4**	DNS											37
11	(United States) Bruce Hamilton											**5**	DNS	34
—	(United States) Joel Haas	DNS	DNS											0
—	(United States) Robert Wright					DNS	DNS	DNS	DNS					0
Pos	Driver	R1	R2	R1	R2	R1	R2	R1	R2	R1	R2	R1	R2	Pts
Pos	Driver	(Georgia (U.S. state)) ATL		(Ohio) MOH		(Pennsylvania) PIT		(Wisconsin) ROA		(New Jersey) NJM		(West Virginia) SUM		Pts

Colour	Result
Gold	Winner
Silver	Second place
Bronze	Third place
Green	Points classification
Blue	Non-points classification
Blue	Non-classified finish (NC)
Purple	Retired, not classified (Ret)
Red	Did not qualify (DNQ)
Red	Did not pre-qualify (DNPQ)
Black	Disqualified (DSQ)
White	Did not start (DNS)
White	Withdrew (WD)
White	Race cancelled (C)
Blank	Did not practice (DNP)
Blank	Did not arrive (DNA)
Blank	Excluded (EX)

**Bold** – Pole

Italics – Fastest Lap

== See also ==
- 2024 F2000 Championship Series
- 2024 F1600 Championship Series
