= 1978 Formula Atlantic season =

Seasons
- ← 1977 1979 →

The 1978 Formula Atlantic Labatts Championship Series season was contested over 7 rounds. In this one-make engine formula all drivers had to utilize Ford engines.

== Calendar ==
| Race No | Track | State | Date | Laps | Distance | Time | Speed | Winner | Pole position | Fastest race lap |
|---|---|---|---|---|---|---|---|---|---|---|
| 1 | Long Beach | California | April 6, 1978 | 50 | 3.250786=162.5393 km | 1'14:18.682 | 131.236 km/h | Howdy Holmes | Bobby Rahal | ? |
| 2 | Westwood | Canada | April 23, 1978 | 56 | 2.89674=162.21744 km | 1'08:47.021 | 141.502 km/h | Keke Rosberg | Jeff Wood | ? |
| 3 | Québec City | Canada | June 11, 1978 | 80 | 2.0293273=162.346184 km | ? | ? km/h | Keke Rosberg | Bobby Rahal | ? |
| 4 | Lime Rock | Connecticut | July 4, 1978 | 65 | 2.462229=160.044885 km | 0'54:55.024 | 174.858 km/h | Bobby Rahal | Howdy Holmes | ? |
| 5 | Elkhart Lake | Wisconsin | July 23, 1978 | 25 | 6.4372=160.93 km | 0'56:05.360 | 172.150 km/h | Howdy Holmes | Bobby Rahal | ? |
| 6 | Hamilton | Canada | August 7, 1978 | 39 | 2.09209=81.59151 km | 0'47:24.585 | 103.259 km/h | Keke Rosberg | Bill Brack | Price Cobb (1:05.694) |
| | Trois-Rivières | Canada | September 3, 1978 | did not count for the championship | | | | | Bill Brack |
| 7 | Montréal | Canada | September 24, 1978 | 35 | 4.409482=154.33187 km | 1'02:08.582 | 149.010 km/h | Jeff Wood | Price Cobb | Price Cobb (1:44.650) |

== Final points standings ==
=== Driver ===
For every race the points were awarded: 30 points to the winner, 24 for runner-up, 19 for third place, 15 for fourth place, 12 for fifth place, 10 for sixth place, 9 seventh place, winding down to 1 point for 15th place. No additional points were awarded. All results count.

| Place | Name | Country | Team | Chassis | Total points | (United States) | (Canada) | (Canada) | (United States) | (United States) | (Canada) | (Canada) |
|---|---|---|---|---|---|---|---|---|---|---|---|---|
| 1 | Howdy Holmes | United States | Shierson Racing | March | 131 | 30 | 9 | 19 | 24 | 30 | - | 19 |
| 2 | Keke Rosberg | Finland | Fred Opert Racing | Chevron | 114 | - | 30 | 30 | 15 | 9 | 30 | - |
| 3 | Price Cobb | United States | Ecurie Canada | March | 103 | - | 19 | 24 | 12 | - | 24 | 24 |
| 4 | Jeff Wood | United States | Great Plains Racing | March | 88 | 15 | 24 | - | 19 | - | - | 30 |
| 5 | Bobby Rahal | United States | Pierre's Motors Racing | Ralt | 68 | - | - | - | 30 | 19 | 19 | - |
| 6 | Tom Gloy | United States | Lane Sports | March | 60 | 24 | 6 | - | 10 | 12 | - |
| 6 | Tom Gloy | United States | Shea Racing | Chevron | 60 | | | | | | | 8 |
| 7 | Bertil Roos | Sweden | AME Racing | March | 57 | 7 | 7 | 9 | 9 | 10 | - | 15 |
| 8 | Bill Brack | United States | Shierson Racing | March | 52 | 10 | - | 10 | 8 | 24 | - | - |
| | Danny Sullivan | United States | ? | March | 52 | - | 10 | - | - | 15 | 15 | 12 |
| 10 | Kevin Cogan | United States | Cogan Racing | Ralt | 49 | 19 | 15 | 15 | - | - | - | - |
| 11 | Chip Mead | United States | Pierre's Motors Racing | Ralt | 45 | - | 12 | 12 | 4 | 7 | 10 | - |
| 12 | Bobby Brown | United States | ? | March | 28 | - | - | 7 | 6 | 8 | - | 7 |
| 13 | Chris Gleason | United States | Gleason Racing | March | 23 | 6 | 5 | 2 | - | 4 | - | 6 |
| | John Mortensen | United States | Shierson Racing | March | 23 | - | - | 6 | 3 | - | 9 | 5 |
| 15 | Bob Earl | United States | Tourte Racing | Chevron | 19 | 12 | - | - | - | - | 7 | - |
| 16 | Mike Rocke | United States | ? | March | 18 | 9 | - | 5 | - | - | 4 | - |
| | Robert Nelkin | United States | Nelkin Racing | March | 18 | - | - | 8 | - | 6 | - | 4 |
| 18 | Rick Bell | United States | ? | Ralt | 16 | - | - | 4 | 2 | 3 | 6 | 1 |
| 19 | Divina Galica | United Kingdom | Fred Opert Racing | Chevron | 15 | 3 | - | - | - | - | 12 | - |
| 20 | Skeeter McKitterick | United States | ? | March | 14 | 4 | - | - | - | - | - |
| 20 | Skeeter McKitterick | United States | AME Racing | March | 14 | | | | | | | 10 |
| | Ken Duclos | United States | ? | Ralt | 14 | - | - | - | 5 | - | - | 9 |
| | Rick Koehler | United States | ? | Excalibur (March) | 14 | - | 3 | - | - | - | 8 | 3 |
| 23 | Dan Marvin | United States | Norman Racing | March | 10 | 2 | 8 | - | - | - | - | - |
| 24 | Carl Liebich | United States | Liebrau Racing | Lola | 9 | 8 | - | - | 1 | - | - | - |
| 25 | James Crawley | United States | Fred Opert Racing | Chevron | 7 | - | - | - | 7 | - | - | - |
| 26 | Bruce Jensen | Canada | ? | Ralt | 6 | - | - | 1 | - | 5 | - | - |
| | Gilles Léger | Canada | ? | Ralt | 6 | - | - | 3 | - | - | 3 | - |
| 28 | Terry Vidger | United States | ? | March | 5 | 5 | - | - | - | - | - | - |
| | Jean-Pierre Alamy | Canada | ? | March | 5 | - | - | - | - | - | 5 | - |
| 30 | Ken Briggs | United States | ? | March | 4 | - | 4 | - | - | - | - | - |
| 31 | Rick Shea | Canada | Shea Racing | Chevron | 2 | - | 2 | - | - | - | - | - |
| | Peter Robinson | United States | ? | Chevron | 2 | - | - | - | - | 2 | - | - |
| | Jeff Smith | Canada | Starr Racing | Chevron | 2 | - | - | - | - | - | 2 | - |
| | Jon Norman | United States | Norman Racing | March | 2 | - | 1 | - | - | - | 1 | - |
| | Giovanni Distasio | United States | ? | March | 2 | - | - | - | - | - | - | 2 |
| 36 | Willy T. Ribbs | United States | ? | March | 1 | 1 | - | - | - | - | - | - |
| | John Bauer | United States | ? | March | 1 | - | - | - | - | 1 | - | - |
