= Swift DB5 =

Prototype racecar

- Category: Sports 2000
- Constructor: Swift Engineering
- Predecessor: Swift DB4
- Successor: Swift DB6

Technical specifications
- Chassis: Carbon fiber monocoque covered in fiberglass body
- Suspension: Steel wishbones, push-rod-actuated coil springs over shock absorbers
- Engine: EAO 2.0 L (122.0 cu in) L4 mid-engined
- Transmission: Hewland 4-speed manual
- Power: 145 hp (108 kW)
- Weight: ~1,310 lb (590 kg)

Competition history
- Debut: 1990

The Swift DB5 is a purpose-built 2-liter prototype, designed, developed and built by Swift Engineering, specifically for Sports 2000 racing, in 1990. Like its predecessor, it is powered by a naturally aspirated 2.0 L (120 cu in) EAO four-cylinder engine, derived from the Ford Pinto, producing 145 hp (108 kW). This drives the rear wheels through a Hewland Mk.8 four-speed manual transmission. It is also very light, weighing only 1,310 lb (594 kg).
