= Race Hamilton =

Labatt's Hamilton Championship
Atlantic Championship
- Location: Hamilton, Ontario, Canada; 43°15′21″N 79°52′23″W
- Corporate sponsor: Labatt Brewing Company
- First race: 1978
- First Atlantic Championship race: 1978
- Last race: 1978
- Laps: 39
- Duration: 47m 24.585s
- Most wins (driver): (Finland) Keke Rosberg (1)
- Most wins (team): Excita/Fred Opert Racing (1)
- Most wins (manufacturer): Chevron B45 - Ford (1)

Circuit information
- Surface: Asphalt
- Length: 1.3 mi (2.1 km)
- Turns: 10
- Lap record: 1m05.964s (Price Cobb, March 78B - Ford, 1978, Formula Atlantic)

Race Hamilton, also known as the Labatt's Hamilton Championship, was a 1978 auto race held in Hamilton, Ontario, Canada featuring a round of the Formula Atlantic Labatt Championship Series. The event featured future driving stars Bobby Rahal, Keke Rosberg and Danny Sullivan competing for $10,000 in first-place prize money.

The race took place on August 7 on a 2.092 km (1.30 miles), 10 turn temporary street circuit in downtown Hamilton with the start/finish line located between the Hamilton City Hall and the Art Gallery of Hamilton.

The race attracted an estimated 60,000 fans, half of those watched for free from the roofs of surrounding buildings and by breaking down barriers. After a five-hour delay due to insurance issues with the safety barriers around the course, only 39 of the scheduled 73 laps took place due to darkness. Only 16 of the 29 cars entered, completed the race.

== Race results ==
Pos	No.	Driver	Team	Chassis/Engine	Laps	Time	Speed
1	4	(Finland) Keke Rosberg	Excita/Fred Opert Racing	Chevron B45 - Ford	39	47m 24.585s	68.113 mph
2	22	(United States) Price Cobb	Ecurie Canada	March 78B - Ford	39	47m 25.208s	68.098 mph
3	2	(United States) Bobby Rahal	Pierre's Motor Racing	Ralt RT1 - Ford	39		67.704 mph
4	34	(United States) Danny Sullivan	Bluebonnet Foods/Quaker State	March 78B - Ford	39		67.394 mph
5	6	(United Kingdom) Divina Galica	Fred Opert Racing/Olympus	Chevron B39 - Ford	39		66.255 mph
6	31	(United States) Chip Mead	Hanna Car Wash/Pierre's Motor Racing	Ralt RT1 - Ford	38		
7	9	(United States) John Mortensen	Doug Shierson Racing	March 78B - Ford	38		
8	51	(United States) Rick Koehler	Brooks Stevens	Excalibur EE2B - Ford	38		
9	19	(United States) Bob Earl	James Brolin	Chevron B-34 - Ford	38		
10	78	(United States) Rick Bell		Ralt RT1 - Ford	38		
11	13	(Canada) Jean-Pierre Alamy		March 78B - Ford	38		
12	15	(United States) Mike Rocke	BDN	March 77B - Ford	37		
13	72	(Canada) Gilles Leger		Ralt RT1 - Ford	37		
14	50	(Canada) Jeff Smith	Starr Racing	Chevron B34 - Ford	37		
15	58	(United States) Jon Norman	Norman Racing	March 78B - Ford	37		
16	71	(United States) John Connolly		Ralt RT1 - Ford	36		
17	20	(United States) Jeff Wood	Great Plains Racing	March 78B - Ford	35	Accident	
18	66	(United States) Peter Robinson		Chevron B39 - Ford	34	Accident	
19	33	(United States) Kevin Cogan	Brian Robertson/Ralt American	Ralt RT1 - Ford	29	Cross member	
20	38	(United States) Tom Gloy	Tom Gloy/Lane Sports	March 77B - Ford	26	Transmission	
21	7	(Canada) Bill Brack	STP Special/Ecurie Canada	March 78B - Ford	22	Accident	
22	8	(United States) Howdy Holmes	Jiffy Mixes/Doug Shierson Racing	March 78B - Ford	10	Mechanical	
23	67	(United States) R.J. Nelkin	Hunter Mountain	March 78B - Ford	10	Mechanical	
24	21	(United States) Michael Follett		Ralt RT1 - Ford	10	Spun	
25	63	(United States) Ralph Manaker	R.M. Racing	March 76B - Ford	3	Mechanical	
26	62	(United States) Cliff Hansen	Charles Gladding	March 78B - Ford	2	Suspension	
25	54	(United States) Carl Liebich	Liebrau Racing	Lola T-560 - Ford	0	Accident	
28	75	(United States) Chris Gleason	Whalley BMW Sales	March 77B - Ford	0	Accident	
29	79	(United States) Bobby Brown	Automatic Radios	March 78B - Ford	0	Accident	
30	24	(United States) Bertil Roos	Racetune/Acme	March 77B - Ford	0	Pulled off	
