= Ken Duclos =

Americas racing driver

Ken Duclos is a Americas former racing driver. Duclos competed in the Trans-Am Series, Atlantic Championship among other series.

== Career ==
Racing a Chevrolet Corvette, Duclos competed in regional SCCA competition. Duclos made his Trans-Am Series debut during the inaugural season. At Bryar Motorsports Park Duclos shared his Ford Mustang with Robert Arego. Competing in the 'Over 2 liter' class the duo failed to finish. He returned to the championship during the following year in the same race. This time he shared the Mustang with Ray Caldwell, but again failed to finish.

Duclos made his Formula B debut in 1969. Racing in an older Brabham BT21A, he finished third in the SCCA North East regional championship. He also made his SCCA National Championship Runoffs debut at Daytona. He qualified on pole position but retired after four laps. Upgrading to a Brabham BT29 for the 1970 championship, he beat Bob Welch to the regional division championship. In 1970 he finished sixth at the SCCA National Championship Runoffs. Running a partial season in 1971, he won the championship in 1972. Despite racing an older Brabham chassis, he kept the March chassis at a distance. Again qualifying on pole position for the SCCA Runoffs but retired after his Ford engine failed. He won the race twice, in 1973 and 1974.

In 1978, Duclos made his professional Atlantic Championship debut. The driver finished eleventh at Lime Rock Park in a Ralt RT1. In the non-championship Grand Prix de Trois-Rivieres, Duclos finished in fifth place. In the season ending race at Circuit Gilles Villeneuve Duclos finished seventh, again scoring championship points. Competing six out of ten races in the 1979 season, Duclos scored three top ten finishes. He placed his Ken Duclos Automotive Ralt RT1 in fourteenth place of the championship.

After finishing ninth in the 1969 Watkins Glen 6 Hours, part of the 1969 Can-Am season, Duclos disappeared from the pro racing scene.

== Motorsport results ==
=== SCCA National Championship Runoffs ===
Year	Track	Car	Engine	Class	Finish	Start	Status
1969	Daytona	Brabham BT23A	Ford	Formula B	15	1	Not running
1970	Road Atlanta	Brabham BT29	Ford	Formula B	6	7	Running
1972	Road Atlanta	Brabham BT29	Ford	Formula B	16	1	Not running
1973	Road Atlanta	Brabham BT40	Ford	Formula B	1	3	Running
1974	Road Atlanta	Brabham BT40	Ford	Formula B	1	1	Running
1975	Road Atlanta	Brabham BT40	Ford	Formula B	16	5	Not running
1976	Road Atlanta	Chevron B34	Ford	Formula B	3	2	Running
1977	Road Atlanta	Chevron B39	Ford	Formula B	3	4	Running
1978	Road Atlanta	Ralt RT1	Ford	Formula B	2	3	Running

=== American Open-Wheel racing results ===
(key) (Races in bold indicate pole position, races in italics indicate fastest race lap)

==== Atlantic Championship ====
Year	Team	1	2	3	4	5	6	7	8	9	10	Rank	Points
1978	New England Racing Partners	LBH	WMP	QUE	LRP; 11	HAM	MON; 7					21st	14
1979	Ken Duclos Automotive	LBH; 19	MEX	WMP	QUE; 7	HAL; 12	LRP	MOS; 12	TRO; 8	BRI	MON; 10	14th	31
