= Swift DB4 =

American open-wheel race car

- Category: Formula Atlantic
- Constructor: Swift Engineering
- Predecessor: Swift DB3
- Successor: Swift DB5

Technical specifications
- Chassis: Carbon fiber monocoque
- Suspension: Steel wishbones, push-rod-actuated coil springs over shock absorbers
- Engine: Toyota 4A-GE 1,600 cc (97.6 cu in) L4 mid-engined
- Transmission: Staffs 5-speed manual
- Power: 240 hp (180 kW)
- Weight: ~ 1,058 lb (479.9 kg)
- Fuel: VP Racing Fuels 102-RON Unleaded gasoline
- Tyres: Yokohama

Competition history
- Debut: 1987

The Swift DB4 is an open-wheel formula racing car chassis, designed, developed and built by American company Swift Engineering, for the Formula Atlantic spec-series, between 1987 and 1997. It won the championship five times, with four championships won four consecutive years in a row (1988, 1990–1993). It was powered by naturally aspirated 1.6 L (98 cu in) Toyota 4A-GE four-cylinder engine, producing about 240 hp (180 kW), which drove the rear wheels through a standard 5-speed manual transmission.

== Technical evolution ==
- Initially released with the Ford BDA, the Swift DB4 was modified to fit the Toyota 4AGE when the rules favored doing so.
- EFI became available in the early 90's by use of the "PLAYERS ATLANTIC CHAMPIONSHIP" ECU developed by EFI USA and the mechanical side was developed by TRD.
- Composites on the chassis originally utilised E Glass then later S Glass and lastly a Carbon/Glass sandwich for the upper chassis. The lower part of the chassis remained an aluminium honeycomb for all Swift DB4s produced.

== Early racing history ==
The first Swift DB4 Formula Atlantic cars were built in Anaheim, California. The first car was chassis number 017-87, being the 17th car built by Swift Cars in 1987. After the successful DB1, DB2 and DB3 models, this was a radical new car to take on the dominant Ralt RT4 from England.

Designer David Bruns built the first American Formula Atlantic car, a car with evolutions such as no air box on the side of the engine. It featured a narrow British Staffs five speed gearbox.

The car was tested at Willow Springs by designer David Bruns and Swift founder R.K.Smith before it was taken to Watkins Glen, for the debut race in the hands of Steve Shelton from Florida, who had ordered the first customer car.

At Watkins Glen, Shelton qualified the new car on pole for the July 5th race, led the race until he ran over a curb and broke a front suspension pushrod and was out the race.

The car was rebuilt and went to Portland International Raceway for the next race in the hands of R.K.Smith. He won a heat along with Jimmy Vasser, who was in the third DB4 built (021-87). In the final Smith beat Vasser to record the first win by a DB4. Vasser went on to win at Laguna Seca over a large Atlantic field in mid October.

The second car (020-87) was delivered to Stuart Moore Racing in Chicago for Steve Shelton, while the fourth car (022-87) went to Peter Greenfield of Long Island, New York.

Shelton finished second in his first outing, at Road America in Wisconsin while Greenfield also made his debut in his new car at the same race. The original car then went to Road Atlanta with R.K. Smith driving but had problems in qualifying and only managed eighth on the grid. With engine problem fixed, Smith drove through the field to win the race, taking the lead on lap 3 of the 24 lap race and comfortably winning, setting fastest race lap as he scored the second consecutive victory for a DB4. At that race, Shelton finished third which secured the HFC Formula Atlantic Championship for him.

At the November Memphis Shootout race with over 48 entries. R.K.Smith qualified on pole from Jimmy Vasser but Ralt RT4 driver Jeff Krosnoff held off Steve Shelton for third fastest. That is how they finished the Memphis race, in that order. Seven new Swift DB4's qualified against thirty nine Ralt RT4's and collected three of the top four results. This caused tremendous interest from new car buyers and fifteen new DB4's were delivered the following year. Swift DB4's dominated the 1988 season winning 18 of 20 races including both Championships with Steve Shelton winning in the East and Dean Hall the West. In 1989 Hiro Matsushita won the Toyota Atlantic championship driving a DB4.

== Chassis produced ==
DB4 chassis list attained from private Swift sales records. Chassis produced from 1992 onwards were not in the records so only those cars in the public domain have been listed 92+. N/C/N reflects no chassis number (spare tub). A total of 86 are known including 9 spare tubs, it can be assumed around 75 Swift DB4's existed.

| Year | Number Made | Chassis Numbers (NNN-YY) | Production Dates (Month-Year) | Notes |
|---|---|---|---|---|
| 1987 | 11 | 017-87, 020-87, 021-87, 022-87, 023-87, 024-87, 025-87, 026-87, 027-87, 030-87, 031-87 | 6-87, 8-87, 8-87, 9-87, 9-87, 10-87, 10-87, 11-87, 11-87, 12-87, 12-87 | |
| 1988 | 17 | 033-87, 034-87, 037-87, 038-87, 001-88, 003-88, 005-88, 008-88, 009-88, 010-88, N/C/N, 014-88, 015-88, 016-88, 017-88, N/C/N, 018-88 | 1-88, 2-88, 2-88, 2-88, 2-88, 3-88, 4-88, 4-88, 5-88, 6-88, 7-88, 8-88, 9-88, 10-88, 11-88, 12-88 | 2 Spare Tubs |
| 1989 | 21 | 019-88, 021-88, 004-89, 005-89, 007-89, 008-89, 012-89, 014-89, 016-89, 017-89, 018-89, 021-89, 024-89, 025-89, 028-89, 031-89, 032-89, 033-89, 034-89, 035-89, 036-89, 037-89 | 1-89, 3-89, 3-89, 3-89, 4-89, 4-89, 4-89, 4-89, 4-89, 5-89, 5-89, 5-89, 5-89, 5-89, 5-89, 10-89, 11-89, 11-89, 12-89, 12-89, 12-89, 1-90 | |
| 1990 | 19 | 006-90, 008-90, 012-90, 015-90, 016-90, 018-90, 019-90, 021-90, 024-90, N/C/N, N/C/N, 035-90, 039-90, 043-90, 045-90, 049-90, 050-90, 055-90 | 1-90, 2-90, 2-90, 3-90, 3-90, 3-90, 3-90, 4-90, 4-90, 4-90, 4-90, 7-90, 8-90, 10-90, 11-90, 11-90, 12-90, 12-90 | 2 Spare Tubs |
| 1991 | 16 | 003-91, 004-91, 007-91, 009-91, 010-91, N/C/N, 014-91, 015-91, N/C/N, N/C/N, 016-91, 019-91, 021-91, N/C/N, 022-91, N/C/N | 1-91, 1-91, 2-91, 2-91, 2-91, 2-91, 3-91, 4-91, 4-91, 4-91, 5-91, 5-91, 11-91, 9-91, 11-91, 11-91 | 5 Spare Tubs |
| 1992 | 1 | 006-92 | Unknown | |
| 1993 | 1 | 004-93 | Unknown | Last Chassis Made |

== Races won ==
The Swift DB4 was a successful chassis in both the SCCA Formula Atlantic and Formula Pacific championships, securing numerous victories between 1987 and 1994 in Formula Atlantic, and in the early 1990s in Formula Pacific. The driver with the most wins is Jimmy Vasser, with a total of 6 wins in the SCCA Toyota Atlantic Championship (5 in 1991 and 1 in 1990).

Swift DB4 Major Wins in Formula Atlantic and Formula Pacific
| Championship | Year | Wins | Location (Winning Driver) |
|---|---|---|---|
| SCCA HFC Formula Atlantic Championship | 1987 | 1 | Road Atlanta 2 (R. K. Smith) |
| SCCA HFC Formula Atlantic Championship | 1988 | 9 | Road Atlanta (Steve Shelton), Milwaukee (Jocko Cunningham), Mosport (Colin Trueman), Elkhart Lake (Colin Trueman), Lime Rock (Freddy Rhemrev), Mid-Ohio 1 (Steve Shelton), Mid-Ohio 2 (Steve Shelton), St. Petersburg (Jocko Cunningham), Sebring (Scott Harrington) |
| SCCA Toyota Atlantic Championship | 1989 | 12 | Long Beach (Hiro Matsushita), Lime Rock (Claude Bourbonnais), Mid-Ohio 1 (Jocko Cunningham), Montréal (Scott Goodyear), Mosport (Jocko Cunningham), Watkins Glen (Jocko Cunningham), Mid-Ohio 2 (Colin Trueman), Topeka 1 (Colin Trueman), Trois-Rivières (Jacques Villeneuve (I)), Elkhart Lake (Claude Bourbonnais), Topeka 2 (Claude Bourbonnais), St. Petersburg (Jocko Cunningham) |
| SCCA Toyota Atlantic Championship | 1990 | 6 | Long Beach (Mark Dismore), Montréal (Jocko Cunningham), Watkins Glen (Brian Till), Trois-Rivières (Brian Till), Elkhart Lake (Jimmy Vasser), St. Petersburg (Brian Till) |
| SCCA Toyota Atlantic Championship | 1991 | 13 | Long Beach (Jimmy Vasser), Phoenix (John Tanner), Lime Rock (Jovy Marcelo), Montréal (Jimmy Vasser), Watkins Glen (Jimmy Vasser), Des Moines (Jimmy Vasser), Toronto (Stuart Crow), Trois-Rivières (Jacques Villeneuve (I)), Vancouver (Stéphane Proulx), Mid-Ohio (Jimmy Vasser), Nazareth (Jovy Marcelo), Laguna Seca 1 (John Tanner), Laguna Seca 2 (Jimmy Vasser) |
| SCCA Toyota Atlantic Championship | 1992 | 9 | Long Beach (Mark Dismore), Lime Rock (Chris Smith), Montréal (Chris Smith), Toronto (David Empringham), Trois-Rivières (Chris Smith), Vancouver (Patrick Carpentier), Mosport (David Empringham), Laguna Seca 1 (Mark Dismore), Laguna Seca 2 (Mark Dismore) |
| SCCA Toyota Atlantic Championship | 1993 | 1 | Halifax (Trevor Seibert) |
| SCCA Toyota Atlantic Championship | 1994 | 1 | Nazareth (Mark Dismore) |
| Formula Pacific | 1991 | 9 | Timaru 1 (Craig Baird), Timaru 2 (Craig Baird), Timaru 1 (Craig Baird), Timaru 2 (Craig Baird), Ruapuna 1 (Craig Baird), Ruapuna 1 (Ken Smith), Bay Park 1 (Ken Smith), Pukekohe 1 (Craig Baird), Pukekohe 2 (Craig Baird) |
| Formula Pacific | 1992 | 1 | Bay Park 1 (Paul Radisich) |
| Formula Pacific | 1993 | 2 | Timaru 2 (Jos Verstappen), Teretonga 1 (Jos Verstappen) |
