= Michael Angus (racing driver) =

American racing driver

Michael Angus (born September 17, 1954) is an American former racing driver from Hinsdale, Illinois.

Angus won the 1985 Formula Atlantic East championship capturing wins at Brainerd International Raceway and Gateway International Raceway (then just a road course known as St. Louis International Raceway). Angus was one of only two drivers to compete in all six races of the championship, easing his path to victory. Angus also won the SCCA Runoffs in Formula Atlantic in 1984 and 1985. After 1986 Angus returned to amateur racing. He competed in a few semi-professional races in the Formula Enterprises National Championship in 2006 and 2007.

Angus also made one IMSA Camel GT start in 1983 in a GTP class Chevron-Buick.
