= Jiffy mix =

Brand of baking mixes

Jiffy
- Product type: Baking mixes
- Current owner: Chelsea Milling Company
- Introduced: 1930; 96 years ago
- Markets: United States
- Website: www.jiffymix.com

Jiffy is a brand of baking mixes marketed by the Chelsea Milling Company in Chelsea, Michigan, that has been producing mixes since 1930. The company was previously named Chelsea Roller Mill. They are known for their products being packaged in a recognizable, small box with the brand's logo in blue. Jiffy was created as the first prepared baking mix in the United States by Mabel White Holmes.

The company is now run and managed by her grandson, Howdy Holmes, a former Indianapolis 500 and CART driver. Holmes became the company's CEO in 1995. In March 2013, the company had around 350 employees, and in 2015 employs about 300 workers and produces 1.6 million boxes of its products each day. Its corn muffin mix accounts for 91 percent of the company's retail sales, and the company's retail market in October 2013 was $550 million.

== History ==
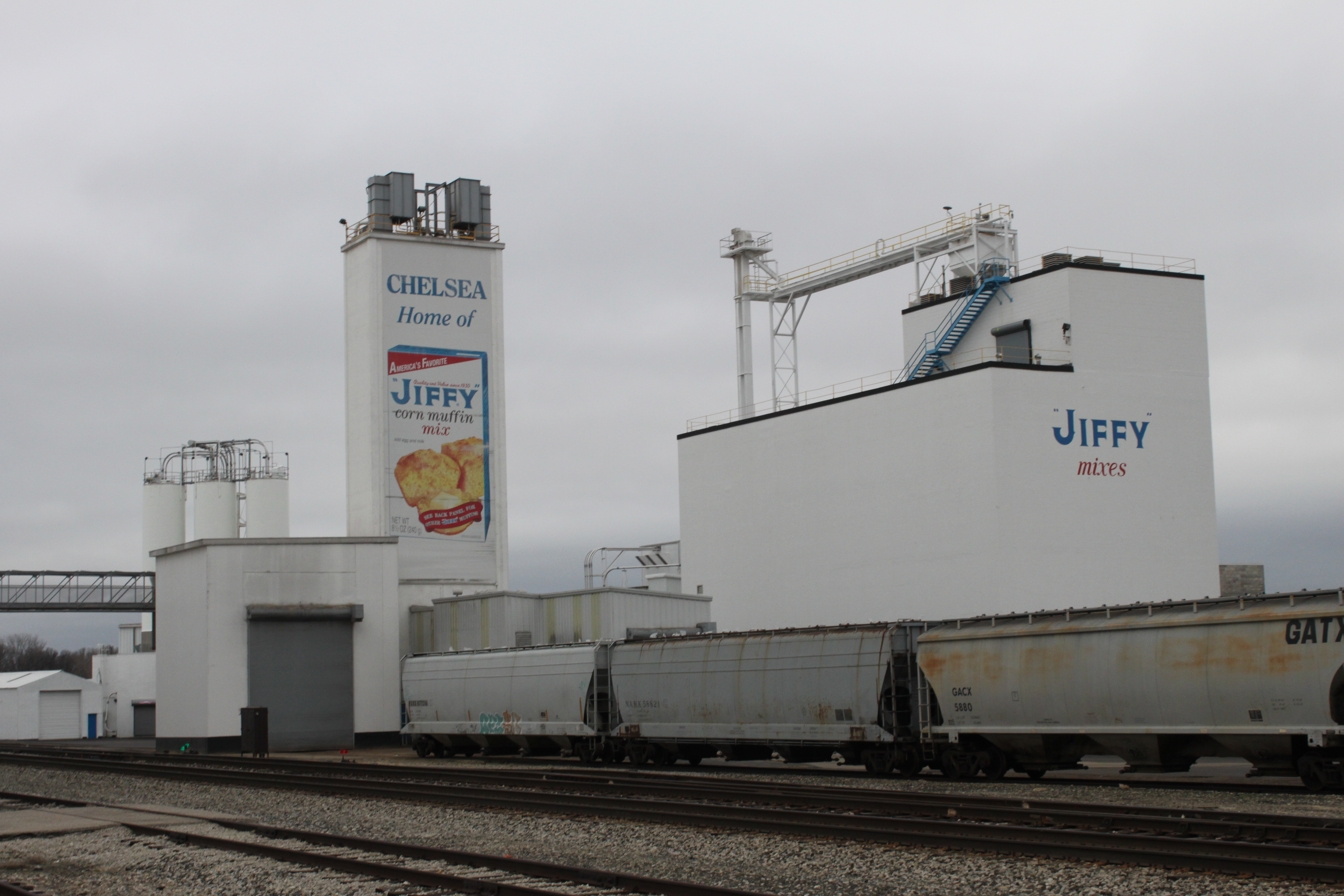
Chelsea Milling Co. grain elevators

Various Jiffy mix products, date unknown

Chelsea Milling Company is a family-operated company with roots in the flour milling business dating back to 1901. Originally a commercial operation that sold only to other businesses, its first baking mix designed for sale to consumers was developed in the spring of 1930 by owner Mabel White Holmes. Reportedly inspired by unappetizing biscuits made by the single father of a friend of her sons, it was marketed as a way to make biscuits that was "so easy even a man could do it."

== Operations ==
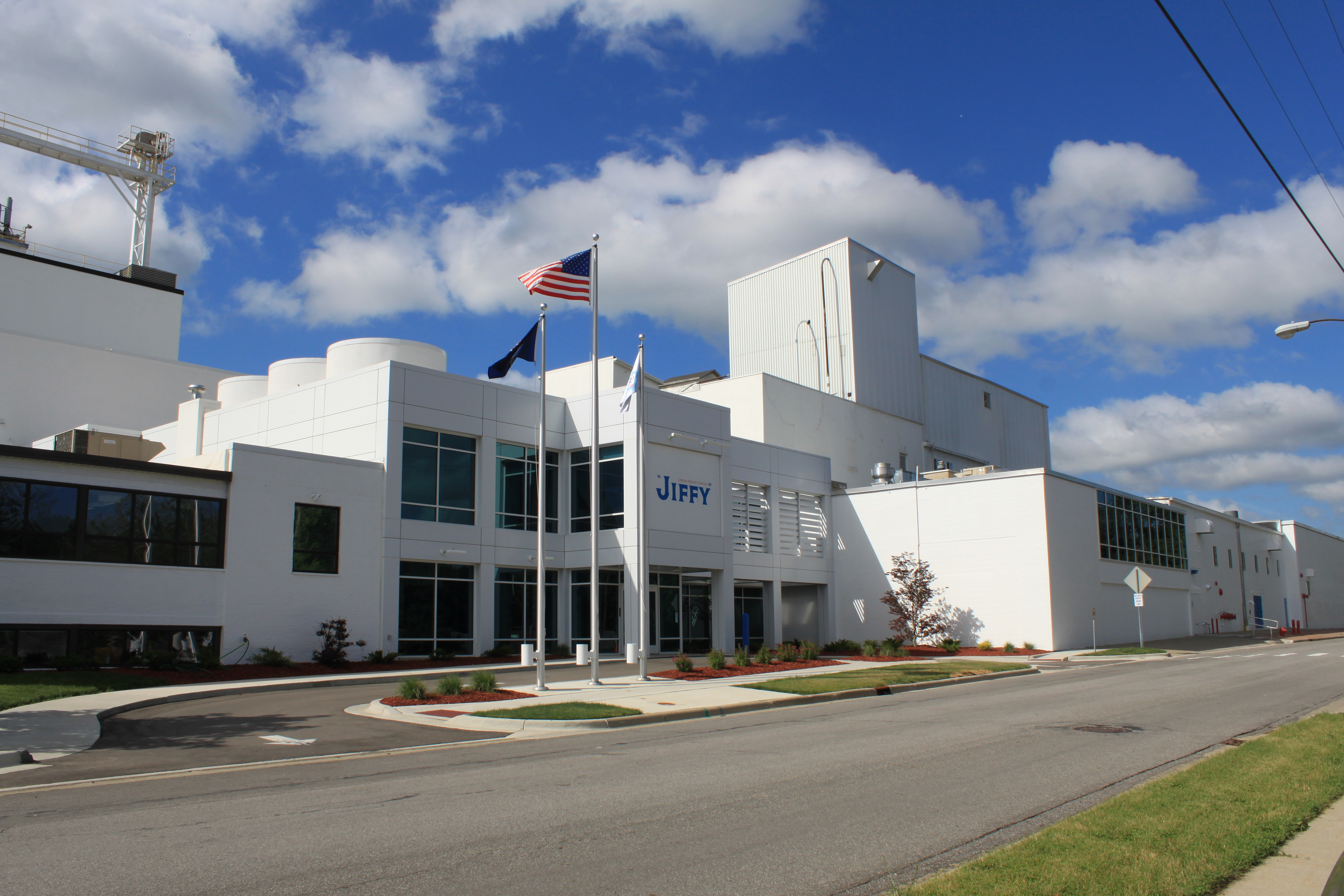
Jiffy Mix Headquarters in Chelsea, Michigan

Most of the company's products are handled, processed, and produced in-house, which includes grain storage, the grinding of grains into flour, product mixing, and box manufacturing. Equipment repair is typically performed by company personnel. A significant amount of product ingredients are sourced from Michigan-raised crops, including "most of the wheat and some of the sugar." Some sugar and shortening is imported from the states of Illinois and Indiana. The company began offering free tours of its facilities and operations to the public in the 1960s, which ceased in 2020 with the COVID-19 pandemic. The company has created three videos for "virtual tours" of the facility which are available for viewing on their website.

== Expansion ==
Boxes of Jiffy corn muffin mix

In 2008, the company began expansion into the food service and institutional industries due to a decline in the home-baking products market. In 2015, this expansion effort was significantly increased, in order to better-enable the company to fulfill the needs of these industries and markets. Expansion plans were in part based upon company projections predicting that many company employees would be retiring between 2006 and 2018. In 2015, 173 of the company's employees were qualified for retirement. Expansion plans include the introduction and implementation of more modern equipment, which requires fewer personnel to operate, and an increased capacity for storage. In 2013, as part of the plans to keep the company moving forward into the future, a new research and development facility was built that cost over $6 million. The company planned for the expansions to conclude by fall 2017. In 2013, Chelsea Milling Company produced 180 million boxes of Jiffy mix during their busy season, which runs from September through January.

== Today ==
As of 2017 Chelsea Milling Company produced and marketed 22 mixes. As of 2015, the company had around a 65 percent market share in the prepared muffin mix category in the United States, and a 90 percent share of the corn muffin mix market, per industry estimates and estimates by Howdy Holmes. The company avoids all advertising for its products, and spends no money on advertising. Holmes has stated that the company's employees earn more pay compared to the industry standard, and also enjoy better benefits compared to the average in the industry. In March 2013, production worker salaries averaged $47,000 annually. The company also offers various resources and classes for its employees. It has been reported that Holmes is on a first name basis with most of the company's employees, and that it is a friendly work environment.

Chelsea Milling Company has received offers from debt-financing companies and also from corporations that are interested in taking over the company. Holmes has stated that he prefers to maintain local control of the company, stating in an interview, "I didn't want a 28-year-old brat from Wall Street telling me how to run my company." Holmes also stated that the company's local nature contributes to their customer loyalty.

== Products ==
Jiffy corn muffin, baking and pie crust mixes

The company's main products are muffin mixes, including those for corn muffins (including vegetarian and honey varieties), banana, berry (blueberry and raspberry), and apple cinnamon. Additional products include brownie mix, cake mixes, pie and pizza crust mixes, and multi-purpose baking mixes. The vegetarian corn muffin mix uses a mixture of palm and soybean oil in place of lard. Multi-purpose mixes purveyed by the company are a pancake and waffle mix, buttermilk biscuit mix and a general "baking mix". The company's corn muffin mix is its most popular brand, and has around a 90 percent market share in the corn muffin mix category in the United States. In 2013, 14 of the company's products were also manufactured in institutional-sized packaging, which is sold to institutions such as hospitals and schools, among others under two brands. The "CMC" brand are products geared for institution use, while the '"Jiffy" Foodservice' brand is geared for the service and restaurant industries.

== Publications ==
- Reynolds, C.F. (2008). "Jiffy": A Family Tradition: Mixing Business and Old-fashioned Values. Chelsea Milling Company. ISBN 978-0-9802326-0-8. 248 pages.
