= Swift 008.a =

- Category: Formula Atlantic
- Constructor: Swift Engineering
- Predecessor: Swift 007.i
- Successor: Swift 009.c

Technical specifications
- Chassis: Carbon fiber monocoque
- Suspension: Steel wishbones, push-rod-actuated coil springs over shock absorbers
- Axle track: 1,676 mm (66.0 in) (front); 1,549 mm (61.0 in) (rear)
- Wheelbase: 2,642 mm (104.0 in)
- Engine: Toyota 4A-GE 1.6 L (97.6 cu in) L4 mid-engined
- Transmission: Hewland 5-speed sequential manual
- Power: 240 hp (180 kW)
- Weight: ~ 1,100 lb (499.0 kg)
- Fuel: VP Racing Fuels 102-RON Unleaded gasoline
- Tyres: Yokohama

Competition history
- Debut: 1998

The Swift 008.a is an open-wheel formula racing car, designed, developed and built by American company Swift Engineering, for use in the Formula Atlantic spec-series, between 1998 and 2001. It was powered by a naturally aspirated 1.6 L (98 cu in) Toyota 4A-GE four-cylinder engine, producing 240 hp (180 kW), which drove the rear wheels through a 5-speed Hewland NST sequential gearbox. It was succeeded by the 014.a in 2002.
