= Swift 009.c =

- Category: CART
- Constructor: Swift Engineering
- Designer: David Bruns
- Predecessor: Swift 008.a
- Successor: Swift 010.c

Technical specifications
- Chassis: carbon fiber monocoque
- Engine: Ford-XD 2,650 cc (161.7 cu in) V8 Turbo
- Weight: 1,500 lb (680.4 kg)
- Fuel: Methanol
- Tyres: Goodyear Eagle; Firestone Firehawk

Competition history
- Notable entrants: Newman-Haas Racing; Della Penna Motorsports
- Notable drivers: (United States) Michael Andretti (Brazil) Christian Fittipaldi (Brazil) Roberto Moreno (United States) Richie Hearn
- Debut: 1998 Marlboro Grand Prix of Miami
- First win: 1998 Marlboro Grand Prix of Miami
- Last win: 1998 Marlboro Grand Prix of Miami
- Last event: 1998 Marlboro 500 Presented by Toyota
Races	Wins	Podiums
19	1	7
Poles	F/Laps	Titles
1	0	0
- Constructors' Championships: 2nd
- Drivers' Championships: 7th

The Swift 009.c was the second CART chassis designed and built by Swift Engineering. Newman-Haas Racing and Della Penna Motorsports entered the chassis during the 1998 CART season.

== History ==
After a successful campaign in 1997, in which the Swift 007.i, won the season opener, successor for the car was designed for 1998. The car was designed by David Bruns in cooperation with Haas CNC. Swift Engineering planned to build six chassis each billing around $425,000.

The Swift 009.c made a stunning debut with Michael Andretti winning the season opener and Christian Fittipaldi finishing fourth. All four entered Swift chassis finished the race. The American built chassis proved to be fast when Andretti also noted the fastest time in the Goodyear tire test at Gateway International Raceway. Andretti finished second in the race at the St. Louis circuit. The best result for Fittipaldi were two third places at Road America and Surfers Paradise. The Brazilian had a heavy crash in opening practice at the Milwaukee Mile. Fittipaldi was knocked unconscious but had no serious injuries despite his chassis being split in half. For the race Fittipaldi was replaced by Team Penske test driver Roberto Moreno.

A third Swift 009.c chassis was entered by Della Penna Motorsports for Richie Hearn. Hearn's best result was a fifth-place finish at Michigan International Speedway. Hearn beat both Newman-Haas Racing entries.

Swift secured the second place in the constructors championship. Second to only the dominant Reynard 98i chassis.

=== Complete CART results ===
(key) (results in bold indicate pole position) (results in italics indicate fastest lap)

Year	Team	Engine	Tyres	Drivers	No.	1	2	3	4	5	6	7	8	9	10	11	12	13	14	15	16	17	18	19	Points	D.C.
1998	Newman-Haas Racing	Ford XD V8t	**G**			MIA	MOT	LBH	NAZ	RIO	GAT	MIL	DET	POR	CLE	TOR	MCH	MDO	ROA	VAN	LAG	HOU	SFR	FON		
1998	Newman-Haas Racing	Ford XD V8t	**G**	(United States) Michael Andretti	6	1*	14	21	18*	5	2*	26	10	17	2	2	6	21	**15**	2	10	28	20	18	**112**	**7th**
1998	Newman-Haas Racing	Ford XD V8t	**G**	(Brazil) Christian Fittipaldi	11	4	25	26	11	21	11	DNS	17	26	11	16	25	13	3	14	9	27	3	7	**56**	**14th**
1998	Newman-Haas Racing	Ford XD V8t	**G**	(Brazil) Roberto Moreno	11							24													**0**	**31st**
1998	Della Penna Motorsports	Ford XD V8t	**F**	(United States) Richie Hearn	10	13	27	23	10	7	28	6	23	10	18	7	5	24	13	16	11	9	18	8	**47**	**16th**
