= Mabel White Holmes =

American inventor and business executive

Mabel White Holmes (December 1, 1890 – November 1977) was the inventor of Jiffy baking mixes, and president of the Chelsea Milling Company.

== Early life ==
Born December 1, 1890, in Mattoon, Illinois, to mill owner E. K. White, Holmes was involved in the mill and flour industry from a young age. She graduated Chelsea High School in 1907 and then went on to pursue higher education at Eastern Michigan University, then known as Ypsilanti Normal College. Prior to her marriage to Howard S. Holmes and subsequent development of Jiffy Mix, Holmes was a school teacher in Illinois.

Holmes' father, E. K. White, had founded a flour mill in 1887, which was incorporated as the Chelsea Milling Company in 1901. In 1908, White sold the company to Mabel's father-in-law, Harmon Holmes. Mabel's husband, Howard Holmes, ran the company until his death in 1936, after which she became company president. Holmes was active in the business until the early 1940s.

== Baking mixes ==
Holmes first had the idea for a prepared, all-purpose baking mix in the late 1920s when she saw the poor quality of a biscuit made by the widowed father of her twin sons' friend. According to family legend she wanted to develop a product that would save time in the kitchen and be so easy "even a man" could make it. Jiffy Biscuit Mix was introduced in 1930 as America's first prepared, all-purpose baking mix, named "Jiffy" because it was quick prepare. Although Bisquick is widely accredited as being the first baking mix on the market due to its notoriety, Jiffy Mix was released first, thus holding the title of first all-purpose baking mix in America.

In the twenty-first century Jiffy has branched out to include mixes for many baked goods, from biscuits to pizza dough, although their staple item is still the corn muffin mix.

Holmes was inducted into the Michigan Women's Hall of Fame in 2015.

Her grandson, Howdy Holmes, a former Indianapolis 500 and CART driver, became the current CEO of the Chelsea Milling Company in 1995.
