= Swift DB1 =

- Category: Formula Ford
- Designer(s): David Bruns
- Production: 125 made
- Successor: Swift DB2 (Direct); Swift DB3 (Formula Ford)

Technical specifications
- Length: 145 inches (3,700 mm)
- Width: 72 inches (1,800 mm)
- Height: 38 inches (970 mm)
- Wheelbase: 85 inches (2,200 mm)
- Engine: Ford Kent 1,599 cubic centimetres (97.6 cu in) Inline 4 Mid-Engine, RWD
- Torque: 146.7 newton-metres (108.2 lbf⋅ft) @ 4,600 rpm
- Transmission: 5-Speed Manual
- Power: 112.9 brake horsepower (84.2 kW) @ 6,300 rpm
- Weight: 900.0 pounds (408.2 kg)

Competition history
Races	Wins	Podiums	Titles
192	49	82	10

The Swift DB1 was the first car built by Swift Engineering. It was produced from 1983 to 1989, though it raced from 1983 to 1996.
