= Swift Engineering =

American spacecraft engineering company

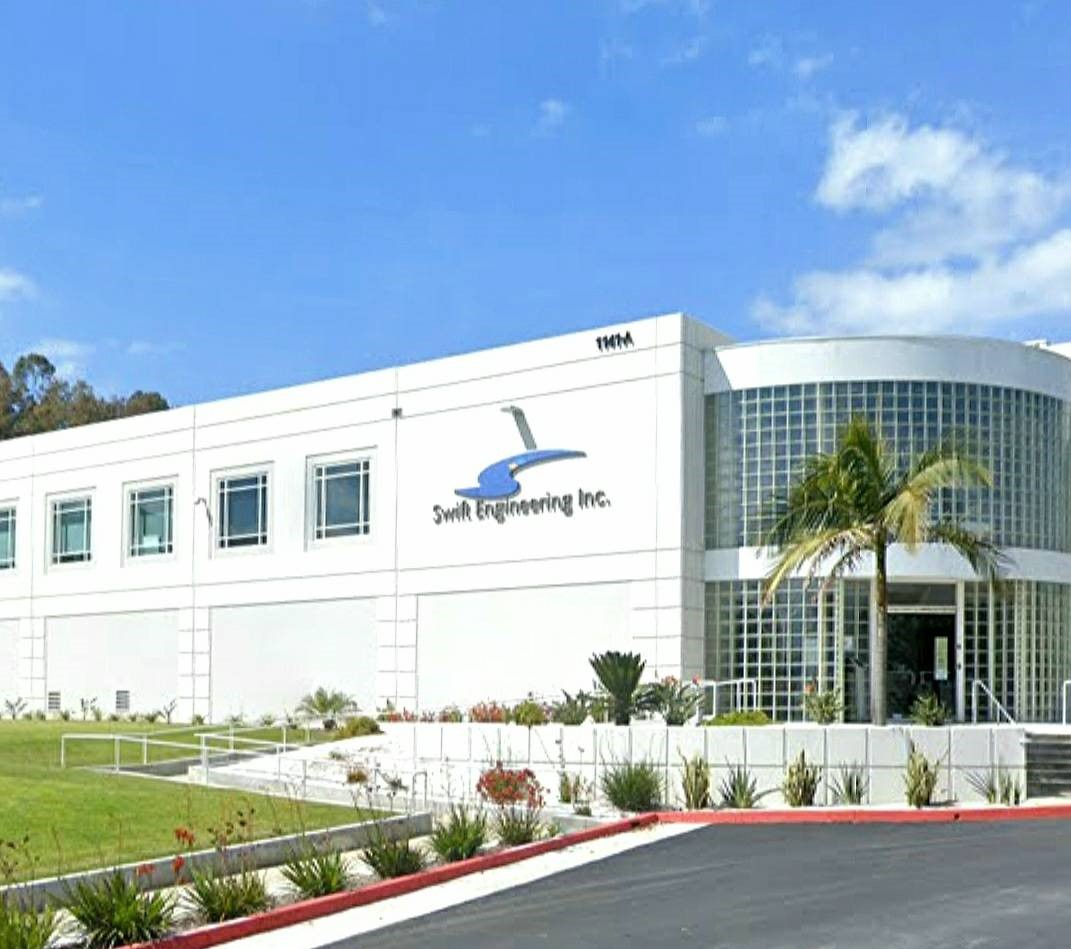
- Swift Engineering headquarters in San Clemente
- Formerly: Swift Racing Cars
- Type: Private, Aerospace manufacturer
- Industry: Aerospace engineering, Aerospace manufacturer, UAS
- Genre: Aerospace engineering
- Founded: 1983; 43 years ago California, USA
- Headquarters: San Clemente, California, United States
- Area served: Worldwide
- Key people: Hiro Matsushita (CEO and Chairman)
- Products: UAS; UAV; Advance electronic sensors & systems
- Brands: Swift Crane, Swift Ultra Long Endurance (SULE)
- Owner: Matsushita International Corp (100%)
- Number of employees: <500
- Parent: Matsushita International Corp
- Divisions: Aeronautics Systems; Defense Systems; Mission Systems; Space Systems
- Subsidiaries: Swift Xi Inc. (60% ownership); Swift Autonomy; Swift Global Communications inc.
- Website: swiftengineering.com

Swift Engineering is an American engineering firm that builds autonomous systems, helicopters, submarines, spacecraft, ground vehicles, robotics, and composite parts. The chairman and CEO is Hiro Matsushita, a former racecar driver and grandson of the founder of Panasonic, Konosuke Matsushita.

Swift used to produce racing cars for open-wheel racing series including Formula Ford, Formula Atlantic, the Champ Car World Series and Formula Nippon. They company has designed and manufactured over 500 race cars.

Swift is certified to AS9100, ISO 14001 and ISO 27000.

== History ==
Swift Engineering was founded in 1983 by David Bruns, Alex Cross, R. K. Smith, and Paul White under the name Swift Racing Cars. Their first car, the DB-1, was a Formula Ford which won the SCCA National Championship in its debut race. The company later built cars for Sports 2000, Formula Ford 2000, Formula Atlantic, and CART. Swift chassis won the Atlantic Championship from 1989 to 1992 and British Formula Renault in 1990.

In 1991, Swift was purchased by Panasonic executive and former Indycar racing driver Hiro Matsushita, grandson of Panasonic founder Konosuke Matsushita, who renamed the firm Swift Engineering. Under his direction, Swift moved up to the CART World Series for 1997, with two cars entered by Newman/Haas Racing and driven by Michael Andretti and Christian Fittipaldi. In CART, Swift cars had four wins and 24 podiums from 182 race entries. Tarso Marques was the last driver to race a Swift chassis in CART in the 2000 season.

In 2000, Swift Engineering started to provide vertically integrated, multi-disciplined product development services including design, development, engineering, testing, and rapid manufacturing of prototypes, demonstrators, and pre-production articles.

In 2018, Swift Engineering formed a joint venture, Swift Xi Inc., with the Kobe Institute of Computing to open its first office abroad in Kobe, Japan. Since 2018, Yale physicist and executive Nick Barua has overseen management.

== Racing cars ==
The first Swift racecar was the DB-1 Formula Ford. The car won its debut race, the 1983 SCCA Runoffs at Road Atlanta. The DB-1 was the third car designed by Bruns and was considered to be a design simplification of Burns's previous design, the Automotive Development ADF. The car was considered a landmark design that rendered prior Formula Ford models obsolete. The DB-1 had the lowest aerodynamic drag of any Formula Ford at its release. Over 100 DB-1s were sold in the 18 months following the car's release. The car won 10 Formula Ford championships over the next 13 years. The closely related DB6 won an additional six championships with the last one in 2008. The success of the car was considered one of the factors that resulted in the slow decline of Formula Ford in the US after 1984.

In 1998, Swift became the sole supplier for the new spec regulation Toyota Atlantic Championship. In 2006, the Atlantic race series became a part of the Champ Car (formerly CART) organization and was renamed the Champ Car Atlantic Championship Powered by Mazda. Swift built a new car for the series, using 016.a as a chassis code. Swift became the sole supplier of chassis for the Japanese Formula Nippon championship in 2009 with the 017.n chassis (also known as the FN09). An updated model called SF13 was used in 2013. The company proposed a derivative of the 017.n, the 020.I, in response to Indy Lights' requirement for a new chassis for the 2014 season.

=== Race cars designed and built by Swift ===
Year	Car	Racing Series	Image	Title
1983	Swift DB1	Formula Ford 1600		
1984	Swift DB2	Sports 2000		Michael Ringström driving a Swift DB2 at the qualification of Suttgarter Rössle's AvD 100 Meilen race
1988	Swift DB3	Formula Ford 2000		
1989	Swift DB4	Formula Atlantic		Hiro Matsushita in Toyota Atlantic Championship 1989 with Swift DB4
1990	Swift DB5	Sports 2000		"1990 Swift".
1991	Swift DB6	Formula Ford 2000 1600/2000		
1997	Swift 007.i	CART		Mario Andretti at 1998 Goodwood Festival of Speed with Swift 007.I
1998	Swift 008.a	Formula Atlantic		
1998	Swift 009.c	CART		
1999	Swift 010.c	CART		
2000	Swift 011.c	CART		
2002	Swift 014.a	Formula Atlantic		Jason Byers holds his arm up to the crowd after winning the Formula Atlantic class at the 2012 SCCA National Championship Runoffs
2006	Swift 016.a	Formula Atlantic		Raphael Matos celebrating a victory in his Swift 016.a Atlantic Championship car in 2007
2007	Swift 016.a	Formula Atlantic		Giacomo Ricci (foreground) passing Frankie Muniz in their Swift 016.a machines during the 2007 Houston race.
2007	Swift 016.a	Formula Atlantic		Robert Wickens driving at the Grand Prix of Houston Champ Car Atlantic support race in 2007.
2009	Swift 017.n	Formula Nippon		Heamin Choi celebrating in his Swift 017.n
2010	Swift 017.n	Formula Nippon	Formula Nippon car in 2010	Formula Nippon 2010 Rd.2 Motegi: André Lotterer(Team Petronas Team TOM'S) during the Sunday free practice session.
2010	Swift FN09	Formula Nippon		Motorsport Japan 2010: Swift FN09's front wing.
2011	Swift 014.a	Formula Atlantic		Formula Atlantic winner Michael Mallinen racing in rain at the 2011 SCCA National Runoffs.
2012	Swift 014.a (Toyota)	SCCA National Championship Runoffs		Jason Byers holds his arm up to the crowd after winning the Formula Atlantic class at the 2012 SCCA National Championship Runoffs
2013	Swift 014.a (Toyota)	SCCA National Championship Runoffs		James French racing to a third-place finish in C Sport Racer at Road America during the 2013 SCCA National Championship Runoffs

== Aviation ==
Beginning in 1997, Swift diversified into aerospace/aviation markets, working with major companies including Northrop Grumman, Boeing, Lockheed Martin, SpaceX, Sikorsky, and others. Swift has also worked for governmental agencies such as NASA.

=== Notable Aviation products of Swift ===
Year	Name	Type	Image	Title	Role
2001	Northrop Grumman Bat	Reconnaissance UAV		During experimentation conducted by U.S. Fourth Fleet and Navy Warfare Development Command (NWDC), the Northrop Grumman Bat unmanned aircraft system flies over the joint high-speed vessel USNS Spearhead (JHSV-1) during its maiden flight off of a U.S. Navy vessel in the Straits of Florida.	Engineering, Analysis & Manufacturing
2007	Eclipse ECJ / 400	Civil utility aircraft		Eclipse ECJ at Airventure 2007.	Engineering, Analysis & Manufacturing
2013	Northrop Grumman MQ-4C Triton	Maritime unmanned surveillance and reconnaissance aerial vehicle and patrol aircraft		MQ-4C Triton Test Flight with Multi-Intelligence Upgrade	Supporting Northrop Grumman in the design and manufacturing of composite structures.
2015	Sikorsky S-97 Raider	Reconnaissance and attack compound helicopter		S-97 Raider in flight	Engineering, manufacturing, etc.
2017	Echo Voyager	Autonomous underwater vehicle(AUV)			Engineering & Manufacturing (Details are confidential)
2017	Swift020/021	VTOL type UAV		Swift020 flying over Kobe 2018	Design, manufacturing
2019	Sikorsky–Boeing SB-1 Defiant	Compound helicopter		A Boeing-Sikorsky flight demo of the SB-1 Defiant, the SARA, and the S-97 Raider at the William P. Gwinn airport in West Palm Beach, FL, Feb. 20, 2020.	A major portion of the airframe structure was designed and manufactured at Swift’s facility in San Clemente, California by an integrated team of Swift and Boeing employees.
2019	Sikorsky Raider X	Reconnaissance and attack compound helicopter			Swift Engineering worked with Sikorsky on FARA Raider-X helicopter. A major portion of the airframe structure is designed and manufactured at Swift’s facility in San Clemente, California.
2021	Lockheed Martin X-59 Quesst	Experimental supersonic aircraft		NASA’s X-59 quiet supersonic research aircraft sits on the ramp at Lockheed Martin Skunk Works in Palmdale, California during sunrise, shortly after completion of painting. With its unique design, including a 38-foot-long nose, the X-59 was built to demonstrate the ability to fly supersonic, or faster than the speed of sound, while reducing the typically loud sonic boom produced by aircraft at such speeds to a quieter sonic “thump”. The X-59 is the centrepiece of NASA’s Quesst mission, which seeks to solve one of the major barriers to supersonic flight over land, currently banned in the United States, by making sonic booms quieter.	Engineering, Analysis & Manufacturing
2021	Swift Crane	VTOL type UAV		Swift Crane flying over Awaji Island, Hyogo 2023	Design, manufacturing
2021	Swift Ultra Long Endurance (SULE)	High-altitude platform station		First test flight at Spaceport America in New Mexico, USA in July 2020	Design, manufacturing

=== Killer Bee ===
Swift Engineering designed, built, and delivered the runway-independent Killer Bee blended wing UAV and its mobile launch/retrieval system in 2002. Northrop Grumman bought the Killer Bee UAV product line from Swift Engineering, and renamed it as the Northrop Grumman Bat in April 2009. It has been used primarily as an ISR gathering tool, and features a 10-ft wingspan with 30-lb payload capacity. In 2009, Raytheon Co. bought Killer Bee's name and technology.

=== Eclipse 400 ===
In 2007 Swift Engineering produced the prototype Eclipse 400 single-engine jet aircraft under contract to Eclipse Aviation. The aircraft was built in secrecy at NASA's Wallops Flight Facility in Virginia and first flown on 2 July 2007. Swift supplies high-strength, low-weight composite parts and assemblies to several aerospace industry customers. Engineering consultancy and designing and producing tooling for composite parts are further aspects of the business.

=== Sikorsky–Boeing SB-1 Defiant ===
Swift Engineering Inc. joined the Sikorsky-Boeing team in 2015 to support the development of the Sikorsky–Boeing SB-1 Defiant Multi-Role Technology Demonstrator (JMR TD), with the design and manufacturing of a significant portion of the airframe structure.

=== Swift020/021 ===
In 2014, Swift started developing the Swift020 fully electric, fully autonomous VTOL UAS. This aircraft is runway-independent and transitions to horizontal flight through its autopilot software. the first UAS featuring X-blade technology, made its first fully autonomous flight demonstration in the city of Kobe, Japan on July 21, 2018. It takes off and lands like a quadrotor but transitions to efficient fixed-wing forward flight without additional launch and recovery equipment, vastly reducing operational time and cost. It has a 4-meter wingspan, 2–3 hours of endurance, and a 1.5-kg payload.

=== Swift Crane ===
The Swift Crane is a VTOL unmanned aerial vehicle designed and developed by Swift Engineering. It is a fixed-wing design and can take off and land vertically. This drone features a large wing and four propellers. Swift Engineering initially released the Swift020 model, which was primarily used for research and development purposes, and later upgraded it to the Swift021. The latest version of the drone, the Swift Crane, is a commercialized variant.

=== Swift Ultra Long Endurance (SULE) ===
In 2018 Swift proposed to design, fabricate, and fly a Swift Ultra Long Endurance (SULE) 30-day mission high-altitude long endurance (HALE) UAS with flight tests including 24-hrs, 48-hrs, and 7-days during the Phase 2 timeline for NASA. All operations, ground control, safety, reviews, and payload will be included in these test flights and within the proposed 2-year timeframe. Swift HALE completed its first test flight from Spaceport America in New Mexico in 2020.

Swift achieved a milestone with its SULE (Swift Ultra Long Endurance) aircraft, soaring to an altitude of 55,904 feet above Mean Sea Level (MSL) during a flight on September 29–30, 2024. Taking off from and landing at Spaceport America in New Mexico, the flight more than doubled the aircraft's previous altitude record of 25,000 feet.

== Naval technology ==
=== XLUUV submarine ===
In 2017, Swift Engineering designed, fabricated, and delivered QTY 10, 10-ft Iridium NEXT payload adapter cylinders, and structures for a 50 ft. XLUUV unmanned submarine.

== Structure ==
Swift Engineering is the parent of a diverse set of subsidiaries.

Subsidiary	Business	Executive Leader
Swift Xi Inc.	Engineering Company	Nick Barua - COO

== Recognitions ==
- 2012: Swift Engineering received the JEC Americas Innovation Award for its out-of-autoclave process
- 2012: Northrop Grumman Small Business Supplier of the Year, awarded from 1500 suppliers
- 2013: Swift Engineering has been chosen as a "Best in Class" A&D Company to Watch by Aviation Week
- 2018: Swift proposed to design, fabricate, and fly a Swift Ultra Long Endurance (SULE) 30-day mission HALE UAS with flight tests including 24-hrs, 48-hrs, and 7-days during the Phase 2 timeline for NASA. All operations, ground control, safety, reviews, and payload will be included in these test flights and within the proposed 2-year timeframe.
- 2019: Swift Engineering has been selected out of 25 companies around the world to install a UAS academy for the Ministry of National Security (Bahamas), to deploy a suite of drones to support the country's command, control, communication, and ISR efforts.
- 2019: Swift is delivering a pair of low-cost (90% reduction), low-weight (50% reduction) telepresence robotic arm replacements to NASA for their Valkyrie humanoid robotic assembly.
- 2019: Swift Engineering has been selected for the design and construction of Future Attack Reconnaissance Aircraft (FARA) Airframe for Sikorsky.
- 2025: Swift Engineering wins Nasa's Small Business Innovation Research (SBIR) award for their Swift Ultra Long Endurance UAS.
