= Swift 010.c =

- Category: CART IndyCar
- Constructor: Swift Engineering
- Designer: David Bruns
- Predecessor: Swift 009.c
- Successor: Swift 011.c

Technical specifications
- Chassis: carbon fiber monocoque
- Engine: Ford-XD; Toyota RV8D 2,650 cc (161.7 cu in) V8 Turbo
- Weight: 1,500 lb (680.4 kg)
- Fuel: Methanol
- Tyres: Goodyear Eagle; Firestone Firehawk

Competition history
- Notable entrants: Newman-Haas Racing; Della Penna Motorsports; Patrick Racing; Team Gordon
- Notable drivers: (United States) Michael Andretti (Brazil) Christian Fittipaldi (Brazil) Roberto Moreno (United States) Richie Hearn (United States) Robby Gordon (Denmark) Jan Magnussen (United States) P. J. Jones
- Debut: 1999 Marlboro Grand Prix of Miami
- First win: 1999 Motorola 300
- Last win: 1999 Texaco/Havoline 200
- Last event: 1999 Marlboro 500
| Races | Wins | Poles | F/Laps | Titles |
|---|---|---|---|---|
| 19 | 2 | 1 | 0 | 0 |
- Constructors' Championships: 2nd

The Swift 010.c was the third CART chassis designed and built by Swift Engineering. Newman-Haas Racing, Patrick Racing, Team Gordon, and Della Penna Motorsports entered the chassis during the 1999 CART season.
