= Swift DB2 =

Prototype racecar

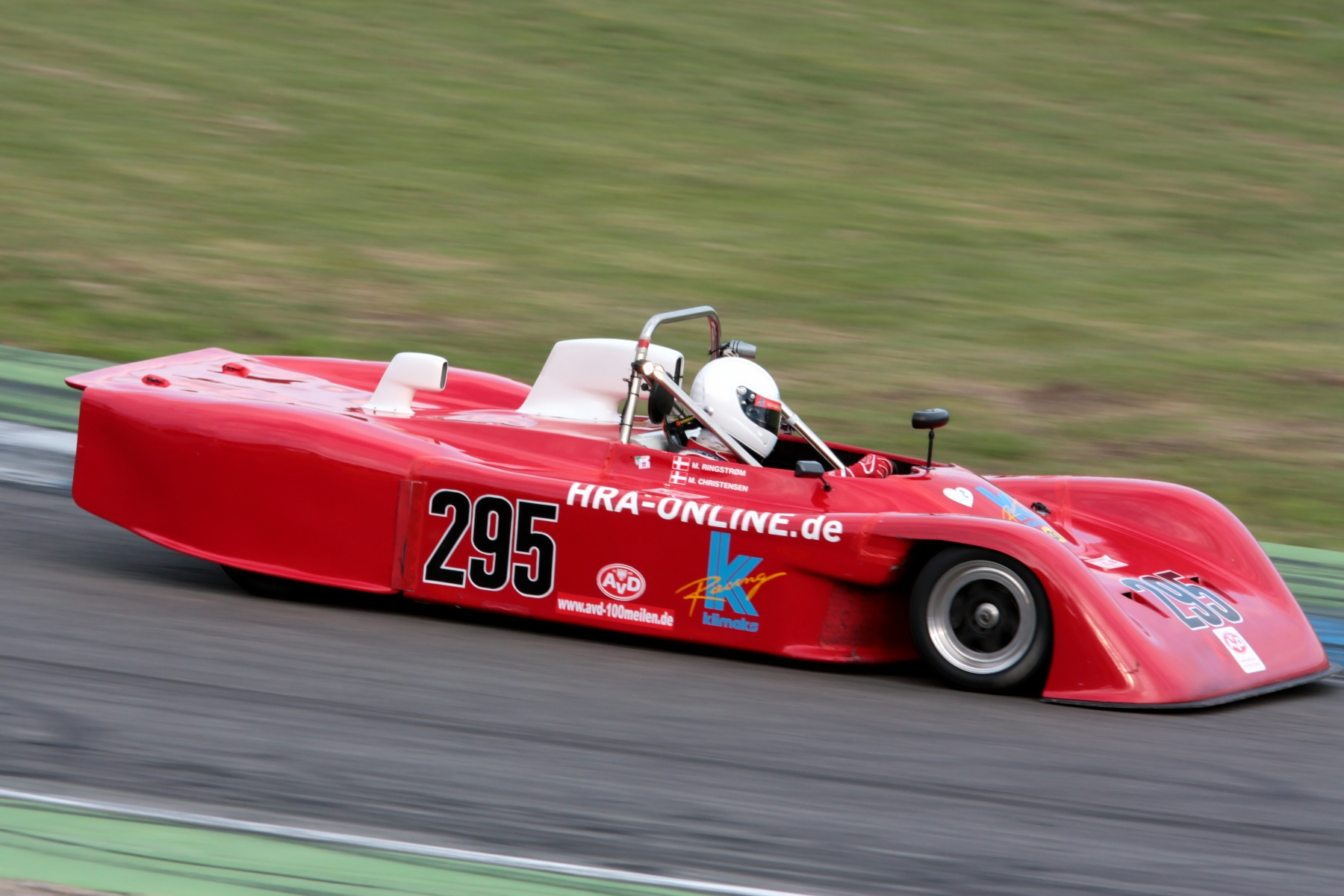
- Category: Sports 2000
- Constructor: Swift Engineering
- Predecessor: Swift DB1
- Successor: Swift DB3

Technical specifications
- Chassis: Carbon fiber monocoque covered in fiberglass body
- Suspension: Steel wishbones, push-rod-actuated coil springs over shock absorbers
- Length: 3,021 mm (118.9 in)
- Width: 1,861 mm (73.3 in)
- Height: 686 mm (27 in); 762 mm (30 in) (with roll cage)
- Axle track: 1,750 mm (68.9 in) (front); 1,728 mm (68.0 in) (rear)
- Wheelbase: 2,226 mm (87.6 in)
- Engine: EAO 2.0 L (122.0 cu in) L4 mid-engined
- Transmission: Hewland Mk.8/Mk.9 4-speed manual
- Power: 145 PS (143 hp; 107 kW) @ 6,000 rpm 160 N⋅m (118 lb⋅ft) @ 3,500 rpm
- Weight: 1,280–1,390 lb (581–630 kg)

Competition history
- Debut: 1985
Entries	Races	Wins	Podiums
80	72	43	61
Poles	F/Laps	Titles	
18	14	2	

The Swift DB2 is a purpose-built 2-liter prototype, designed, developed and built by American company Swift Engineering, for Sports 2000 racing, in 1985. As per the rules and regulations, it is powered by a naturally aspirated 2.0 L (120 cu in) EAO four-cylinder engine, derived from the Ford Pinto, producing 143 hp (107 kW). This drives the rear wheels through a Hewland Mk.8 four-speed manual transmission. It is also very light, weighing only 1,310 lb (590 kg).
