= Swift 016.a =

American open-wheel race car

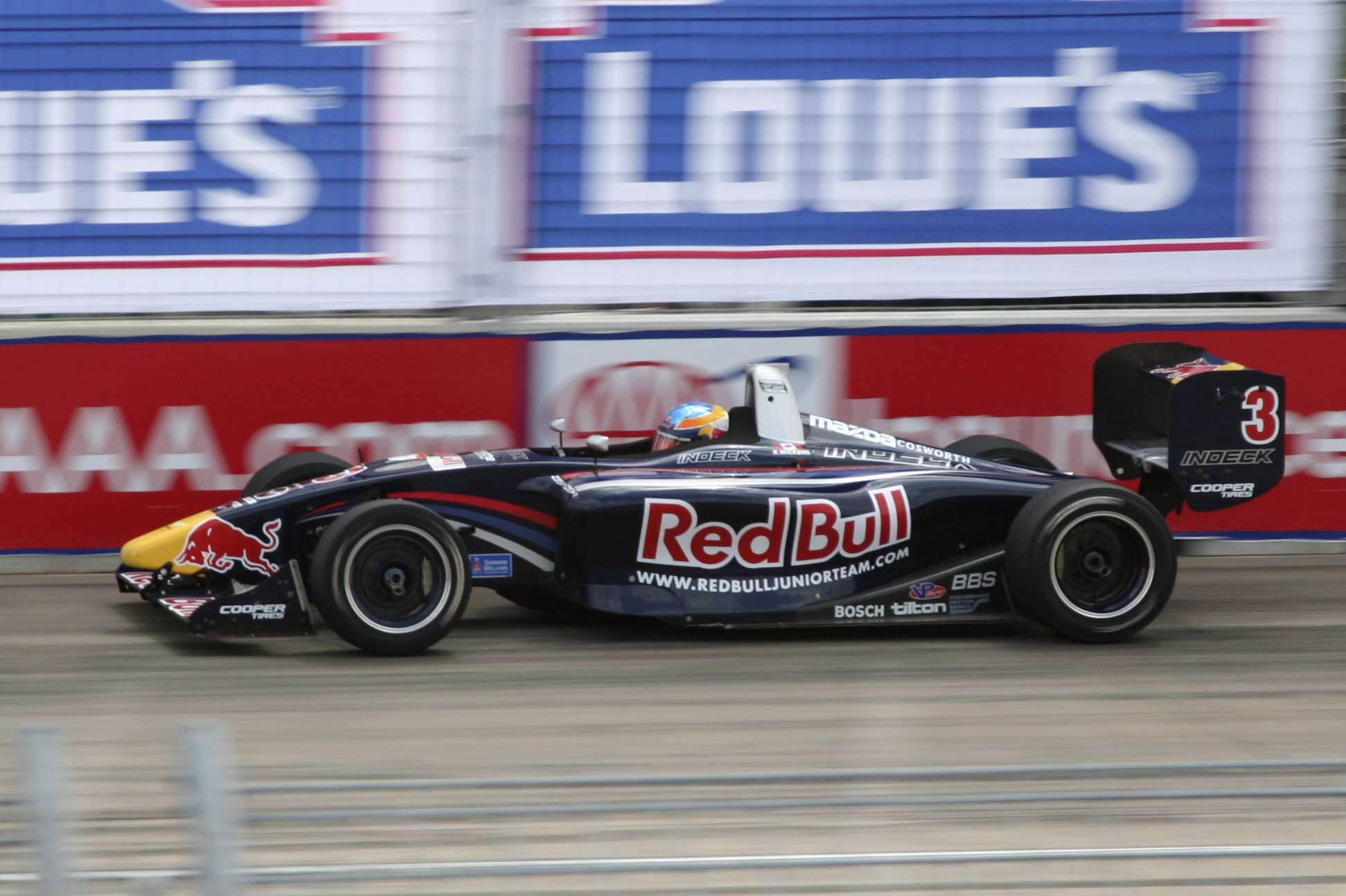
- Category: Formula Atlantic
- Constructor: Swift Engineering
- Predecessor: Swift 014.a
- Successor: Swift 017.n

Technical specifications
- Chassis: Carbon fiber/Epoxy prepreg monocoque with honeycomb core
- Suspension: Steel wishbones and cast-aluminum uprights
- Length: 177 in (4,500 mm)
- Width: 77 in (2,000 mm)
- Axle track: 66 in (1,700 mm) (front); 61 mm (2.4 in) (rear)
- Wheelbase: 109 in (2,800 mm)
- Engine: Mazda-Cosworth MZR 2,300 cc (140.4 cu in) L4 mid-engined
- Transmission: Swift/Hewland 5-speed sequential manual
- Weight: 1,418 lb (643.2 kg)
- Fuel: VP Racing Fuels 102-RON Unleaded gasoline
- Tyres: Cooper

Competition history

The Swift 016.a is an open-wheel formula racing car, designed, developed and manufactured by American company Swift Engineering, for the Formula Atlantic spec-series, and has been the sole car used in the series since 2006. They are powered by naturally aspirated 2.3 L (140 cu in) Mazda four-cylinder MZR engines, which has been specially tuned by Cosworth, to produce 300 hp (220 kW). This drives the rear wheels through a 5-speed sequential manual transmission. The monocoque chassis itself is very strong, rigid and durable; able to withstand 13,490 lbf (60,000 N) of vertical force, 10,120 lbf (45,000 N) of longitudinal force, and 2,700 lbf (12,000 N) of lateral (side) force.
