= Howdy Holmes =

American racing driver (born 1947)

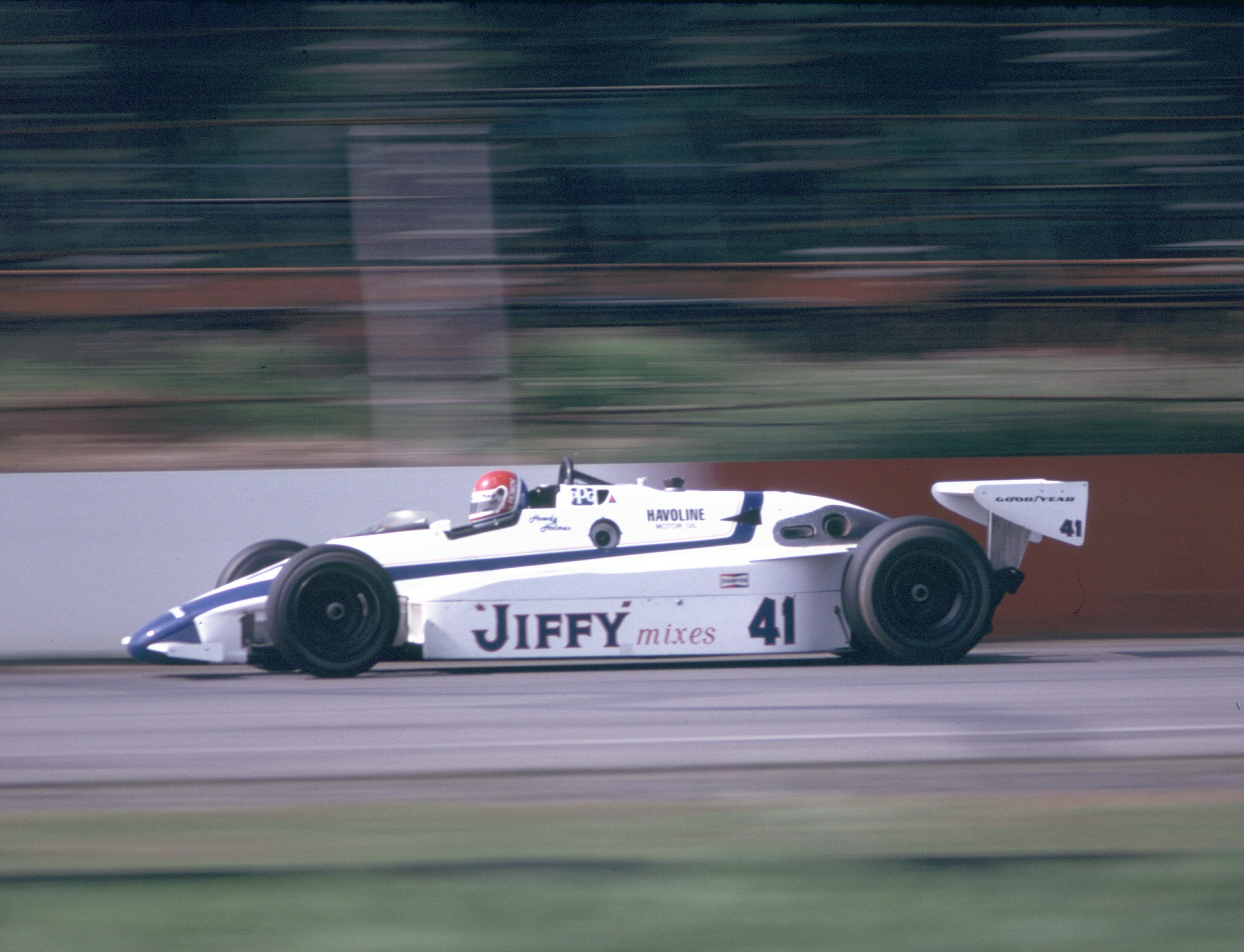
- Holmes driving a March 84C-Cosworth DFX during the 1984 Domino's Pizza 500 at Pocono International Raceway
- Born: Ann Arbor, Michigan, U.S.
- Achievements: 1978 North American Formula Atlantic champion
- Awards: 1979 Indianapolis 500 Rookie of the Year

Champ Car career
- 74 races run over 7 years
- Years active: 1979-1980, 1982-1985, 1988
- Team(s): AMI Racing (1979-1980); Doug Shierson Racing (1982-1983); Mayer Racing (1984); Forsythe Racing (1985); Morales Motorsports (1988)
- Best finish: 12th - 1984
- First race: 1979 Indianapolis 500 (Indianapolis)
- Last race: 1988 Nissan Indy Challenge (Tamiami Park)
| Wins | Podiums | Poles |
|---|---|---|
| 0 | 1 | 0 |

Howard "Howdy" Samuel Holmes III (born December 14, 1947) is an American former auto racing driver. He began racing in the early 1970s and was based in Stockbridge, Michigan, about 36 miles (58 km) southeast from downtown Lansing and 15 miles (24 km) northwest of Chelsea, where his family owned a milling company. In 1978, he became the Formula Atlantic champion.

Holmes primarily drove in the USAC and CART Championship Car series. He competed during the 1979–1980, 1982–1985 and 1988 seasons, with 74 combined career starts, including six in the Indianapolis 500. He was the race's Rookie of the Year with a seventh-place finish in 1979. Holmes had 28 top-ten finishes in total, with a best of second place at Phoenix in 1984. He also made occasional sports car starts and participated in the 1980 Macau Grand Prix.

Holmes is currently the President of Chelsea Milling Company, his family's firm that was founded in 1901. His grandmother Mabel White Holmes became famous for inventing the Jiffy line of baking mixes in 1930, and the family brand served as a sponsor for his cars.

== Indy car career (USAC and CART) ==
Holmes was born in Ann Arbor, Michigan. He would make his IndyCar debut in the USAC National Championship during 1979 for AMI Racing in the No. 46 Jiffy Mixes/Armstrong Mould Wildcat Mk. 2-Drake Goosen Sparks at the Indianapolis 500. In the race Holmes qualified in 13th place and was the only rookie to qualify, meaning he won the Rookie of the Year by default. Holmes finished the race in seventh place. Holmes drove a second race, the Music 500 Presented by Musicland & Sam Goody at Pocono International Raceway, starting and finishing seventh. Holmes finished 12th in the USAC points while going unranked in the rival SCCA/CART PPG World Series due to that championship not awarding points to drivers who did not compete in any events sanctioned by them.

In 1980, USAC and CART merged to form the Championship Racing League while also counting for points in the CART championship. Holmes returned with AMI Racing to drive the No. 43 Jiffy Mixes/Armstrong Mould Orbitor-Cosworth DFX. While Holmes was attempting to qualify the car at Indianapolis he spun out. Holmes then tried to qualify AMI's No. 45 Armstrong Mould Lola T6000-Cosworth DFX, failing to qualify in that car also and missing the race as a result. During the season, the Orbitor showed some promise, such as qualifying sixth at the Kent Oil 150 at Watkins Glen Grand Prix Circuit and recording an eighth-place finish at the True Value 500 at Pocono International Raceway. Holmes finished 12th in the CRL/USAC standings and 22nd in the CART standings. Holmes did not compete in any races in 1981.

In 1982, Holmes drove for Doug Shierson Racing in the No. 30 Domino's Pizza March 82C-Cosworth DFX. During the season Holmes got best finishes of fourth at the Provimi Veal Tony Bettenhausen 200 at Wisconsin State Fairgrounds Park Speedway and fifth at the Detroit News Grand Prix at Michigan International Speedway to finish 13th in points. During this year, Holmes qualified for the Indianapolis 500 (counted towards the USAC Gold Crown Championship) to finish tenth in the race and 26th in the USAC standings.

For 1983, Holmes returned with Doug Shierson Racing to drive the No. 30 Domino's Pizza March 83C-Cosworth. During the year Holmes got a best finish of fifth at the Cribari Wines 300K at Laguna Seca Raceway. Holmes also competed in the Indianapolis 500 (sanctioned by USAC, but counted for points by CART), starting 12th and finishing sixth. Holmes finished 13th in the CART standings and ninth in the USAC standings.

In 1984, Holmes joined Mayer Racing to drive the No. 41 Jiffy Mixes March 84C-Cosworth DFX. The season started off well as Holmes finished second to teammate Tom Sneva at the Dana Jimmy Bryan 150 at Phoenix International Raceway. Holmes then qualified second to Sneva at the Indianapolis 500. Holmes' car suffered mechanical problems throughout the race and Holmes finished 13th, 15 laps down. The rest of the season brought some more points finishes, although none were as good as Holmes' early-season form. Holmes finished the season 12th in the CART points and unranked in the USAC points due to scoring no points at Indianapolis.

For 1985, Holmes joined Forsythe Racing to drive the No. 33 Jiffy Mixes Lola T85/00-Cosworth DFX. Holmes got a best finish of ninth at the Michigan 500 at Michigan International Speedway. Holmes also finished 10th at the Indianapolis 500, despite a collision with Rich Vogler that caused Vogler and Tom Sneva to crash. Following the Detroit News 200 at Michigan International Speedway Holmes was replaced by Jan Lammers. Holmes finished the season 25th in the CART standings and tenth in the USAC standings. Holmes did not compete in any races in 1986 or 1987.

In 1988, Holmes drove for Morales Motorsports in the No. 21 Jiffy Mixes March 88C-Cosworth DFX. During the season Holmes got a best finish of seventh at the Quaker State 500 at Pocono International Raceway. Holmes also had a good run at the Indianapolis 500, starting 33rd (last) and finishing 12th. Holmes finished the season with an eighth-place finish at the Nissan Indy Challenge at Tamiami Park in what was Holmes' final Indy car race. Holmes finished 18th in the CART standings and 12th in the USAC standings.

== Post-racing career ==
After retiring from racing, Holmes became the president of Chelsea Milling Company, the manufacturer of Jiffy Mixes, which was invented by Holmes' grandmother Mabel White Holmes. Holmes has also made appearances at the Indianapolis Motor Speedway on Legends Day (a day that honors past drivers of the Indianapolis 500) and other times simply as a spectator or guest of Chip Ganassi Racing, of which Jiffy has been an associate sponsor since 2023.

== American open–wheel racing results ==
=== SCCA National Championship Runoffs ===
| Year | Track | Car | Engine | Class | Finish | Start | Status |
|---|---|---|---|---|---|---|---|
| 1972 | Road Atlanta | Lola T252 | Volkswagen | Formula Super Vee | 13 | 2 | Retired |
| 1973 | Road Atlanta | Lola T252 | Volkswagen | Formula Super Vee | 3 | 5 | Running |

(key)

=== Complete USAC Mini-Indy Series results ===
| Year | Entrant | 1 | 2 | 3 | 4 | 5 | 6 | 7 | 8 | 9 | 10 | Pos | Points |
|---|---|---|---|---|---|---|---|---|---|---|---|---|---|
| 1977 | Wilbur Bunce Racing | TRE; 2 | MIL; 3 | MOS; 9 | PIR; 23 | | | | | | | **3rd** | **340** |
| 1978 | | PIR1 | TRE1 | MOS | MIL1; 27 | TEX | MIL2 | OMS1 | OMS2 | TRE2 | PIR2 | **69th** | **2** |

=== CART/Champ Car World Series ===
(key) (Races in bold indicate pole position)

| Year | Team | 1 | 2 | 3 | 4 | 5 | 6 | 7 | 8 | 9 | 10 | 11 | 12 | 13 | 14 | 15 | 16 | Rank | Points | Ref |
|---|---|---|---|---|---|---|---|---|---|---|---|---|---|---|---|---|---|---|---|---|
| 1979 | AMI Racing | PHX | ATL | ATL | INDY; 7 | TRE | TRE | MCH | MCH | WGL | TRE | ONT | MCH | ATL | PHX | | | NC | - | |
| 1980 | AMI Racing | ONT | INDY; DNQ | MIL; 15 | POC; 8 | MDO; 14 | MCH; 11 | WGL; 13 | MIL | ONT; Rpl^{1} | MCH | MEX | PHX | | | | | **22nd** | **314** | |
| 1982 | Doug Shierson Racing | PHX; 16 | ATL; DNS^{2} | MIL; 10 | CLE; 16 | MCH; 12 | MIL; 4 | POC; 27 | RIV; 16 | ROA; 10 | MCH; 5 | PHX; 10 | | | | | | **13th** | **56** | |
| 1983 | Doug Shierson Racing | ATL; 9 | INDY; 6 | MIL; 7 | CLE; 12 | MCH; 32 | ROA; 16 | POC; 13 | RIV; 13 | MDO; 8 | MCH; 8 | CPL; 17 | LAG; 5 | PHX; 21 | | | | **13th** | **39** | |
| 1984 | Mayer Racing | LBH; 13 | PHX; 2 | INDY; 13 | MIL; 7 | POR; 17 | MEA; 17 | CLE; 12 | MCH; 21 | ROA; 14 | POC; 9 | MDO; 6 | SAN; 9 | MCH; 8 | PHX; 19 | LAG; 20 | CPL; 16 | **12th** | **44** | |
| 1985 | Forsythe Racing | LBH; 14 | INDY; 10 | MIL; 11 | POR; 17 | MEA; 13 | CLE; 22 | MCH; 9 | ROA; 10 | POC; 21 | MDO; 16 | SAN; 21 | MCH; 18 | LAG; DNS | PHX | MIA | | **25th** | **12** | |
| 1988 | Alex Morales Motorsports | PHX; 10 | LBH; 17 | INDY; 12 | MIL; 8 | POR; 16 | CLE; 13 | TOR; 11 | MEA; 23 | MCH; 23 | POC; 7 | MDO; 14 | ROA; 11 | NAZ; 14 | LAG; 23 | MIA; 8 | | **18th** | **24** | |

^{1} Replaced by Jerry Sneva
^{2} Race was delayed six days due to rain in the area. The qualified cars of Holmes, Johnny Rutherford, Dick Ferguson, and Chip Ganassi did not return to the rescheduled race.

=== Indianapolis 500 results ===
| Year | Chassis | Engine | Start | Finish |
|---|---|---|---|---|
| 1979 | Wildcat | Drake Goosen Sparks | 13th | 7th |
| 1980 | Orbitor | Cosworth | Did not Qualify | |
| 1982 | March | Cosworth | 18th | 10th |
| 1983 | March | Cosworth | 12th | 6th |
| 1984 | March | Cosworth | 2nd | 13th |
| 1985 | Lola | Cosworth | 21st | 10th |
| 1988 | March | Cosworth | 33rd | 12th |

Sporting positions
| Preceded by Gilles Villeneuve; 1977 Canadian Champion | North American Formula Atlantic; Champion; 1978 | Succeeded by Tom Gloy |
| Preceded by Gilles Villeneuve; 1976 American Champion | North American Formula Atlantic; Champion; 1978 | Succeeded by Tom Gloy |
| Preceded by Larry Rice; Rick Mears | Indianapolis 500; Rookie of the Year; 1979 | Succeeded by Tim Richmond |
