= Swift 014.a =

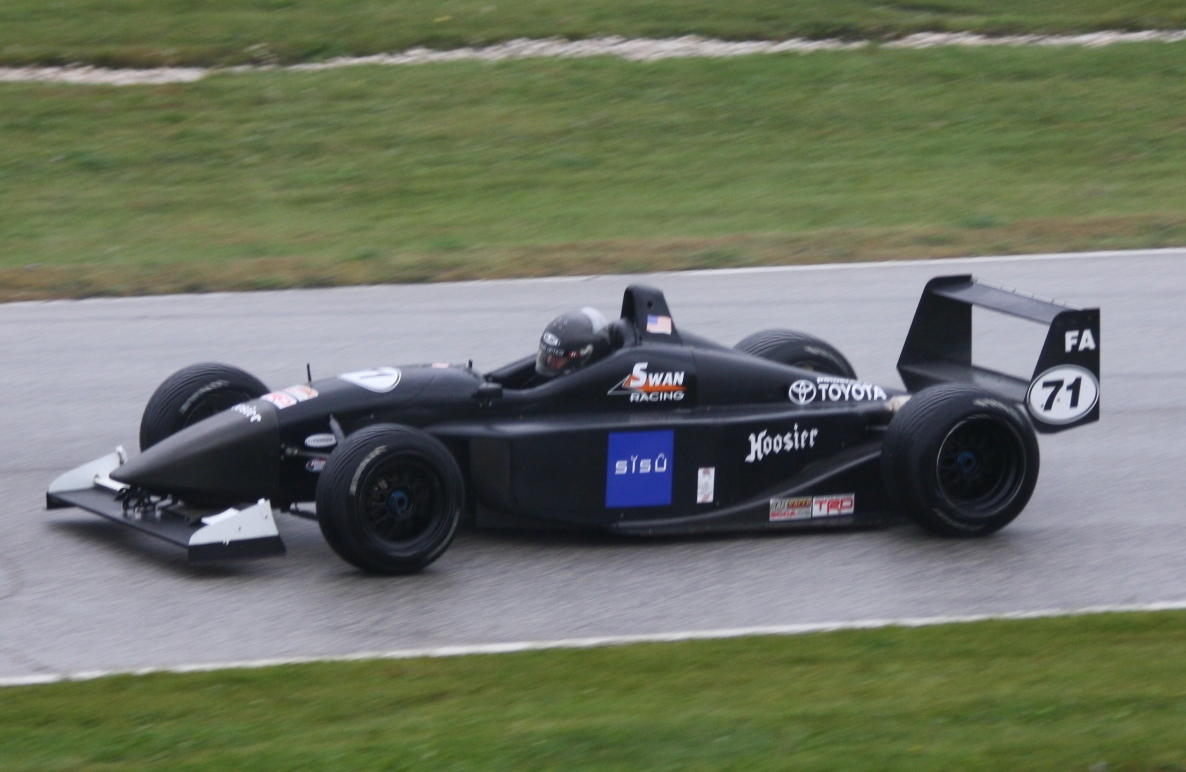
- Category: Formula Atlantic
- Constructor: Swift Engineering
- Predecessor: Swift 011.c
- Successor: Swift 016.a

Technical specifications
- Chassis: Carbon fiber/Epoxy prepreg monocoque with honeycomb core
- Suspension: Steel wishbones and cast-aluminum uprights
- Engine: Toyota 4A-GE or Mazda MZR 1,600–2,000 cc (97.6–122.0 cu in) L4 mid-engined
- Transmission: Hewland 5-speed sequential manual
- Weight: ~ 1,275 lb (578.3 kg)
- Fuel: VP Racing Fuels 102-RON Unleaded gasoline
- Tyres: Cooper

Competition history
- Debut: 2002

The Swift 014.a is an open-wheel formula racing car, designed, developed and built by American company Swift Engineering, for the Formula Atlantic spec-series, between 2002 and 2005. It was powered by a naturally aspirated 1.6 L (98 cu in) Toyota 4A-GE, but also used a 2.0 L (120 cu in) Mazda MZR. This drove the rear wheels through a 5-speed Hewland sequential gearbox. It was eventually succeeded by the 016.a in 2006.
