= Formula Atlantic =

Open-wheel racing specification

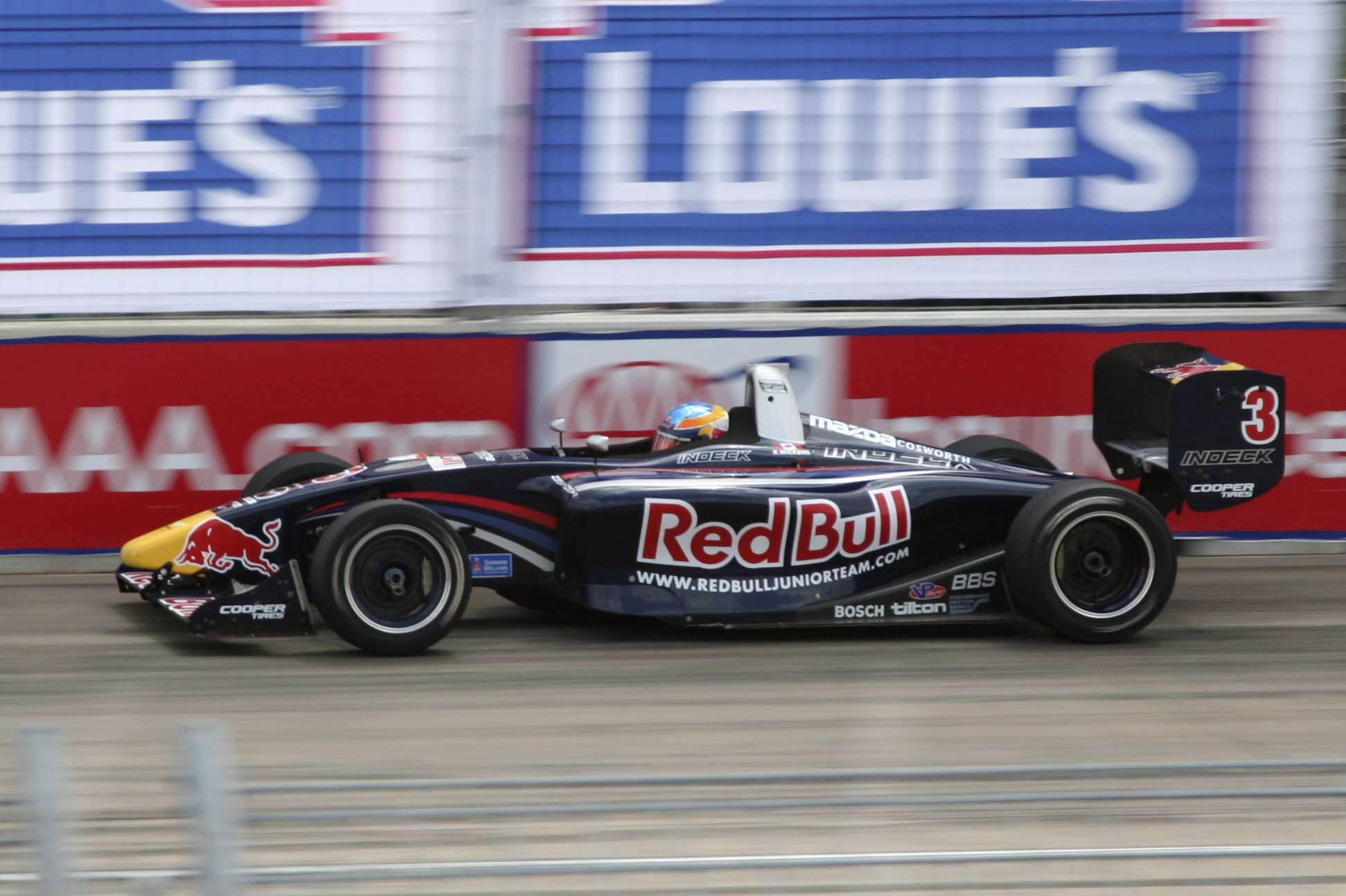
2007 Formula Atlantic car

Formula Atlantic is a specification of open-wheel racing car developed in the 1970s. It was used in professional racing through the IMSA Atlantic Championship until 2009 and is currently primarily used in amateur racing through Sports Car Club of America Formula Atlantic.

== History ==
The history of Formula Atlantic begins with the SCCA Formula B class, created in 1965 for single-seat formula cars with engines not exceeding 1600cc in capacity. Prior to Formula Atlantic, professional Formula B races were held in the United States from 1965 to 1972, firstly with the SCCA's poorly supported Formula A, then as part of the SCCA Grand Prix Championship in 1967 and 1968, which Roger Barr won in a Twin-Cam powered Crosslé, and then in their own independent series from 1969 to 1972.

Formula Atlantic as a class evolved in the United Kingdom in 1971 from the US Formula B rules, with 1600cc production-based twin-cam engines (initially Cosworth Mk.XIII based on Lotus-Ford Twin Cam and then Cosworth BDD; however, other engines like Alfa Romeo were also eligible). Conceived by John Webb of Brands Hatch (who would later also develop the Sports 2000 class) as a category for national competitors with the performance near a Formula Two car but running costs at or below that of a contemporary Formula Three car. A single Yellow Pages championship ran in 1971-2, with a rival BP backed series appearing in 1973. 1974 saw the BP series changing sponsor to John Player and the Yellow Pages series becoming backed by John Webb's MCD organisation and Southern Organs; in practice, most top drivers competed in both series, and there were no date clashes. Only one series ran in 1975-6, in the final year taking the title Indylantic and adopting Indianapolis-style single-car qualifying. But the formula was under threat from Formula Three, and no series ran in 1977-78. A BRSCC-organized club racing series returned in 1979 with initial backing from Hitachi and continued to 1983, with diminishing grids and few new cars appearing.

As a result of its similarity to Formula Two and Formula Three in terms of chassis regulations, Formula Atlantic typically used chassis closely related to these cars—with performance somewhere in between the two—so most of the manufacturers were familiar with those classes, particularly the likes of Brabham, Lotus, March, and Chevron early on, with Ralt and then Reynard later. US manufacturer Swift came to displace the British imports and dominate in North America. Several smaller marques also appeared.

The first professional races run under Formula Atlantic rules in North America were conducted in 1974 by the CASC in Canada (now ASN Canada), drawing much attention and large fields due to its national CTV television coverage. IMSA in the United States took advantage of the large number of teams and organized their own series in 1976.

During these years, the series attracted guest drivers from Europe, including Formula One, particularly at the Trois-Rivières street race in Quebec, Canada. Guest drivers included James Hunt, Jean-Pierre Jarier, Riccardo Patrese, Patrick Depailler, Jacques Laffite, Didier Pironi, and Vittorio Brambilla.

In 1977, the SCCA sanctioned the US events, and in 1978 the CASC and SCCA series merged, and conducted the series jointly until 1983, when it ran as the Formula Mondial North American Cup and was won by Michael Andretti. The series could not sustain the success of earlier seasons and was cancelled for 1984. Formula Mondial was an international category introduced by the FIA in 1983 with the intention of replacing both Formula Atlantic and Formula Pacific, the latter being a variant of Formula Atlantic that had been introduced in a number of Pacific Basin countries in the late 1970s.

== Current FA SCCA Club Racing ==
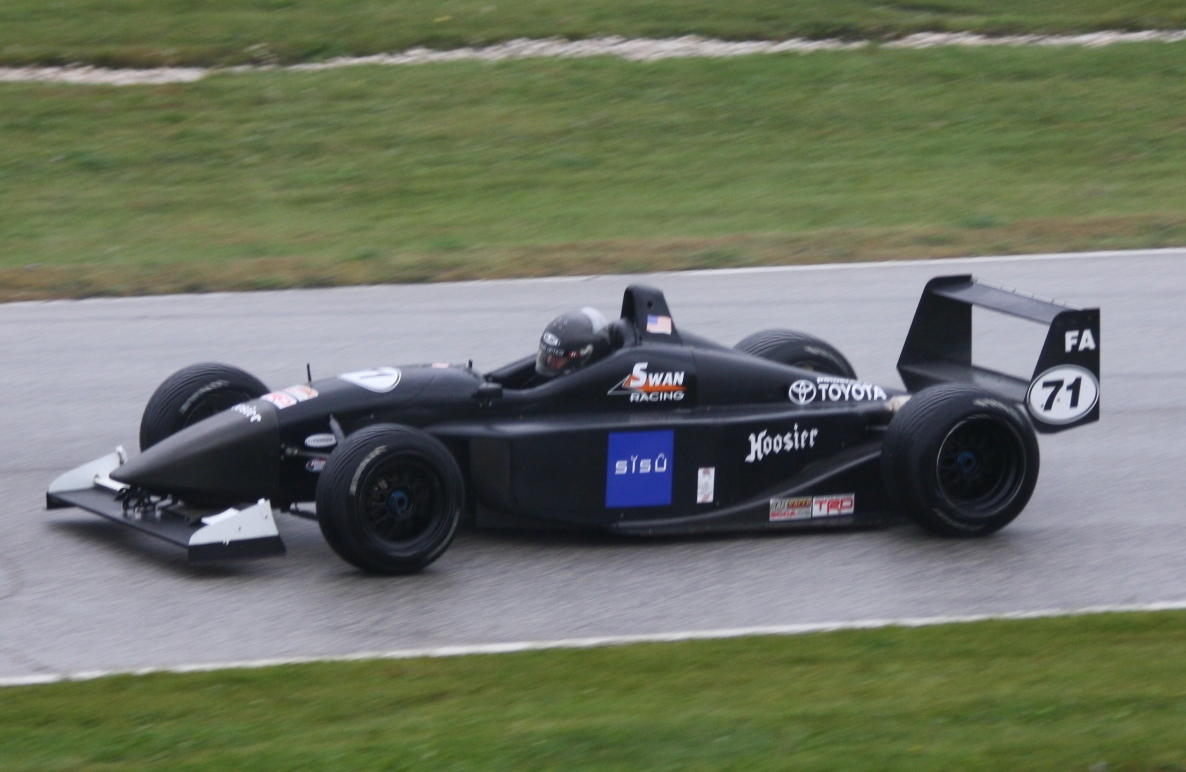
2011 SCCA National Championship Runoffs winner Michael Mällinen

SCCA Formula Atlantic cars are allowed wings and ground effects. They use either the Toyota 4AGE engine or the Cosworth BDD. Cars meeting Super Vee specifications were also allowed but are now rarely seen. Prior to 2006, these rules were also largely used in the professional series, except that all cars had to run a Fuel Injected 4AGE. This meant that competitive amateur teams could also participate in professional races and that old pro series equipment could be raced at the amateur level. However, in 2006 the pro series introduced a spec chassis, the Swift Engineering 016.a, and a new spec engine, the Mazda-Cosworth MZR. The result was that the cars used in the pro series were drastically different from the amateur cars. In 2009, to shore up small race fields, the pro series introduced a "C2 class" for amateur-level cars, primarily the Swift 014.a, the dominant chassis in amateur competition at the time. However, the C2 class saw few entries and was abandoned in the middle of the season.

Since 2011, SCCA Club Racing has allowed the Swift 016.a and Mazda-Cosworth MZR, albeit with an inlet restrictor, to maintain parity with the older Toyota-powered cars. As of 2017, most nationals competitors were running the 016.a-Mazda combination. Also eligible for the class are Mazda rotary powered cars made for the Pro Mazda Championship. In 2018, the professional series will switch to a new car, and all of the rotary cars will be available for club racing use, although they appear to not be competitive with cars built to the FA specification, even older ones. Additionally, in 2019, the SCCA will allow sealed Mazda MZR engines to be used in older chassis, such as the Swift 014.a, as parts availability for the Toyota engines has become an issue.

The minimum weight of a Toyota or BDD powered Atlantic car is 1230 lbs. (558 kg) with driver. The SCCA considers it its fastest club racing class. Prior to gaining its own class, the Formula SCCA car raced in Formula Atlantic, where it was uncompetitive.

== Tribute ==
In 2012 and 2014, the Rolex Monterey Motorsports Reunion historic automobile racing event at Mazda Raceway Laguna Seca in Monterey, California, had a tribute to Formula Atlantic as a part of its scheduled groups.

== Formula Atlantic at the SCCA National Championship Runoffs ==
Year	Winner	Car	Engine
Formula B
1965	(United States) Earl Jones	LeGrand	Alfa Romeo
1966	(United States) Don Morin	Brabham	Ford
1967	(United States) Chuck Dietrich	McLaren	Ford
1968	(United States) Roger Barr	Crosslé	Ford
1969	(United States) Bill Monson	Brabham	Ford
1970	(United States) Skip Barber	Tecno	Ford
1971	(United States) Bob Lazier	March 71B	Ford
1972	(United States) Chuck Sarich	March 722	Ford
1973	(United States) Ken Duclos	Brabham BT40	Ford
1974	(United States) Ken Duclos	Brabham BT40	Ford
1975	(United States) Bobby Rahal	March 75B	Ford
1976	(United States) Bobby Brown	March	Ford
1977	(United States) Kevin Cogan	Ralt RT1	Ford
1978	(United States) Jerry Hansen	Lola T460	Ford
Formula Atlantic
1979	(Canada) Tim Coconis	Ralt RT1	Ford
1980	(United States) Ken Dunn	Ralt RT1	Ford
1981	(United States) Hubert Phipps	Ralt RT4	Ford
1982	(United States) James King	Ralt RT4	Ford
1983	(United States) Riley Hopkins	Ralt RT4	Ford
1984	(United States) Michael Angus	Ralt RT4	Ford
1985	(United States) Michael Angus	Ralt RT4	Ford
1986	(United States) Chris Clark	Ralt RT4	Ford
1987	(United States) Russell Newman	Ralt RT4	Ford
1988	(United States) John Thompson	Swift DB4	Ford
1989	(United States) Wayne Cerbo	Ralt RT4	Ford
1990	(United States) Joseph Hamilton	Swift DB4	Ford
1991	(United States) Jordan Harris	Swift DB4	Ford
1992	(United States) Christopher Fahan	Swift DB4	Ford
1993	(United States) Greg Ray	Swift DB4	Ford
1994	(United States) Stan Wattles	Ralt RT40	Ford
1995	(United States) Dan Carmichael	Ralt RT40	Ford
1996	(United States) Steve Forrer	Ralt RT40	Ford
1997	(United States) Steve Forrer	Ralt RT40	Ford
1998	(United States) B.J. Zacharias	Ralt RT41	Ford
1999	(United States) Brian French	Ralt RT41	Ford
2000	(United States) Larry Connor	Ralt RT41	Ford
2001	(United States) Larry Connor	Ralt RT41	Ford
2002	(United States) Mike Biangardi	Ralt RT41	Ford
2003	(United States) Rennie Clayton	Ralt RT41	Ford
2004	(United States) Bob Stallings	Swift 014.a	Toyota
2005	(United States) Graham Rahal	Swift 014.a	Toyota
2006	(United States) Mirl Swan	Swift 008.a	Toyota
2007	(United States) Hans Peter	Swift 014.a	Toyota
2008	(United States) David Grant	Swift 014.a	Toyota
2009	(United States) Mirl Swan	Swift 014.a	Toyota
2010	(United States) David Wilcox	Swift DB4	Toyota
2011	(United States) Michael Mallinen	Swift 014.a	Toyota
2012	(United States) Jason Byers	Swift 014.a	Toyota
2013	(Turkey) Sedat Yelkin	Swift 014.a	Toyota
2014	(United States) Connor Kearby	Swift 016.a	Mazda-Cosworth
2015	(United States) Tyler Hunter	Swift 014.a	Toyota
2016	(United States) Ryan Norman	Swift 016.a	Mazda-Cosworth
2017	(United States) Keith Grant	Swift 016.a	Mazda-Cosworth
2018	(United States) Mirl Swan	Swift 016.a	Mazda-Cosworth
2019	(United States) Flinn Lazier	Swift 016.a	Mazda
2020	(United States) Spencer Brockman	Swift 014.a	Mazda
2021	(United States) James French	Ralt RT41	Toyota
2022	(United States) Alex Mayer	JDR	Ford
2023	No race held		
2024	(United States) Dudley Fleck	Swift 016a	Mazda
2025	(United States) Hans Peter	Swift 016a	Mazda
2026	(United States) Dudley Fleck	Swift 016a	Mazda

== See also ==
- Formula Pacific
- Formula Mondial
