= Dick Baker =

Dick Baker may refer to:

- Dick Baker (colonial administrator) (1933–2023), British businessman
- Dick Baker (racing driver) (1938–2001), Canadian racecar driver
- Two Ton Baker (Dick Baker, 1916–1975), American singer

== See also ==
- Dick Barker (1897–1964), American athlete and coach
- Richard Baker (disambiguation)
