= Richard Baker =

Richard Baker or Richie Baker may refer to:

== Arts and entertainment ==
- Richard Baker (broadcaster) (1925–2018), British broadcaster
- Richard Baker (composer) (born 1972), British composer and conductor
- Richard A. Baker (makeup artist) (born 1950), known as Rick, American special makeup effects artist
- Richard Baker (game designer), American author and game designer
- Richard Anthony Baker (1946–2016), British radio producer and author
- Richard Foster Baker (1857–1921), American director and actor
- Machine Gun Kelly (rapper) (Richard Colson Baker, born 1990), American rapper and actor
- Two Ton Baker (Dick Baker, 1916–1975), American singer

== Business ==
- Richard Baker (merchant) (1819–1875), American merchant
- Richard C. Baker (1858–1937), UK/US businessman, President of Pacific Coast Borax and Tonopah and Tidewater Railroad
- Richard Baker (American businessman, born 1946) (1946–2009), American businessman and surf apparel executive for Ocean Pacific
- Richard Baker (British businessman, born 1962), former chief operating officer of Asda Stores Ltd. and CEO of Boots Group
- Richard A. Baker (businessman) (born 1965), American chairman and CEO of the Hudson's Bay Trading Company in Canada

== Politics ==
- Richard Baker (English politician, died 1594), Member of Parliament for Lancaster, Horsham, New Shoreham and New Romney
- Richard Baker (American politician) (born 1948), American politician from Louisiana
- Richard Baker (Scottish politician) (born 1974), Scottish politician
- Richard Baker (Victorian politician) (1830–1915), Victorian state politician
- Richard Chaffey Baker (1842–1911), South Australian politician, first President of the Senate
- Richard Langton Baker (1870–1951), Canadian politician
- Richard Wingfield-Baker (1802–1881), British Liberal Party politician, MP for South Essex, 1868–1874

== Religion ==
- Richard Baker (theologian) (1741–1818), English theological writer
- Richard H. Baker (bishop) (1897–1981), Episcopal bishop of North Carolina
- Richard Baker (Zen teacher) (born 1936), American Zen Buddhist teacher

== Sports ==
- Richard Baker (cricketer) (born 1952), English cricketer
- Richie Baker (Irish footballer) (born 1980), former Irish footballer
- Richie Baker (English footballer) (born 1987), English footballer

== Other ==
- Richard Baker (chronicler) (1568–1645), English chronicler
- Richard A. Baker (historian) (born 1940), historian of the United States Senate
- Richard Thomas Baker (1854–1941), Australian economic botanist
- Richard H. Baker, inventor of an electronic circuit called the "Baker clamp"
- Richard R. Baker (1909–1993), pronouncer of the Scripps National Spelling Bee

== See also ==
- Dick Baker (disambiguation)
- Rick Baker (disambiguation)
