= De Gruchy =

de Gruchy is a surname. Notable people with the surname include:

- Bill de Gruchy (born 1930), Australian sprinter
- Bill de Gruchy (footballer) (1877–1958), Australian rules footballer
- Geoffrey de Gruchy Barkas (1896–1979), British filmmaker and camoufleur
- Henry De Gruchy (1898–1952), Australian cricketer
- Jeanelle de Gruchy, British public health official
- John De Gruchy (born c. 1935), Canadian motorcycle racer
- John W. de Gruchy (born 1939), South African theologian
- Nigel de Gruchy (born 1943), British trade unionist
- Ray De Gruchy (1932–2025), British footballer from Jersey
