= Greedy =

Someone who is greedy is consumed with selfish desires. Greedy may also refer to:

== Music ==
- Greedy (album), an album by Headless Chickens, 1997
- Greedy, an album by Mekdes, 2022
- "Greedy" (Ariana Grande song), 2016
- "Greedy" (Tate McRae song), 2023
- "Greedy", a song by All from Mass Nerder, 1998
- "Greedy", a song by The Away Team from Training Day, 2007
- "Greedy", a song by Lyfe Jennings from Lyfe 268‒192, 2004
- "Greedy", a song by Pure, 1993
- "Greedy", a song by Rich the Kid from Keep Flexin, 2016
- "Greedy", a song by PartyNextDoor and Drake from Some Sexy Songs 4 U, 2025

== People ==
- Greedy Smith (1956–2019), pseudonym of Andrew McArthur Smith, singer, musician and songwriter with the Australian pop/new wave band Mental As Anything
- Greedy Vance Jr. (born 2001), American football player
- Greedy Williams (born 1997), American football player nicknamed "Greedy"
- Jack Greedy (1929–1988), Canadian racing driver, member of the Canadian Motorsport Hall of Fame

== Fictional characters ==
- Greedy Gretchen, a character who appeared in episodes of the American TV sitcoms Three's Company and Three's a Crowd
- Greedy Smurf, a character in The Smurfs franchise
- Mr. Greedy, title character of a book in the Mr. Men series
- Little Miss Greedy, title character of a book in the Little Miss series (related to the Mr. Men series)

== Other uses ==
- Greedy algorithm, any algorithm that follows the problem-solving heuristic of making the locally optimal choice at each stage
- Greedy (film), a 1994 comedy

== See also ==
- Greed (disambiguation)
