= Canadian Grand Prix (disambiguation) =

The Canadian Grand Prix is a Formula One motor race. It can also refer to:

- Canadian motorcycle Grand Prix
- ISU Junior Grand Prix in Canada, for junior figure skating
- Skate Canada International, a senior figure skating international grand prix

== See also ==
- Grand Prix of Mosport
- Grand Prix of Montreal
- Mont-Tremblant Champ Car Grand Prix
- Motorsport in Canada
