= Ron Farmer =

Ron Farmer is the name of:

- Ron Farmer (footballer) (1936–2022), Guernsey professional footballer
- Ron Farmer (motorsport), Canadian motorsport manager
