= Ross de St. Croix =

Canadian sports car racing driver

Ross de St. Croix is a Canadian sports car racing driver. He is known for winning the 1967 Canadian Can-Am Championship in a McLaren and for being president of the Canadian Automobile Sports Club and the Montreal Motor Racing Club. Along with Bruce McLaren and Jim Hall, he is cited as the creator of the hugely successful Can-Am series in North America. He raced all disciplines of motorsport including National Rally's and Ice Racing in his native Quebec. He was inducted into the Canadian Motorsport Hall of Fame in 1994.

A native of Montreal, Quebec, de St. Croix competed in a Trans-Am Series race in 1966 driving a McLaren M1B purchased directly from Bruce McLaren.
