= Supertest (disambiguation) =

Supertest Petroleum was a Canadian oil and gas company.

Supertest may also refer to:

- In World Series Cricket, a series of unofficial Test matches in 1977 and 1978
- In the 2005 ICC Super Series, a one-off Test match

== See also ==
- Supertest Ladies Open, an LPGA Tour event
- Miss Supertest III, a hydroplane owned by the owner of Supertest Petroleum
