= ACHS =

ACHS may refer to:

== American schools ==
- Adolfo Camarillo High School, Camarillo, California
- Alexandria City High School, Alexandria, Virginia
- Allen Central High School, Eastern, Kentucky
- American Canyon High School, American Canyon, California
- American College of Healthcare Sciences, Portland, Oregon
- Antioch Community High School, Antioch, Illinois
- Archbishop Carroll High School (Washington, D.C.)
- Argo Community High School, Summit, Illinois
- Arlington Catholic High School, Arlington, Massachusetts
- Atlantic City High School, Atlantic City, New Jersey
- Almeta Crawford High School, Fort Bend County, Texas

== People with the surname ==
- Ken Achs, former Canadian drag racer

== Other uses ==
- Association of College Honor Societies
- Asociación Chilena de Seguridad (Chilean Safety Association)
