= Bob Atchison =

Canadian drag racer

Bob Atchison (born 1941) is a Canadian drag racer. He was inducted into the Canadian Motorsport Hall of Fame in 2006.

== See also ==
- Motorsport in Canada
