= Terry Capp =

Canadian drag racer

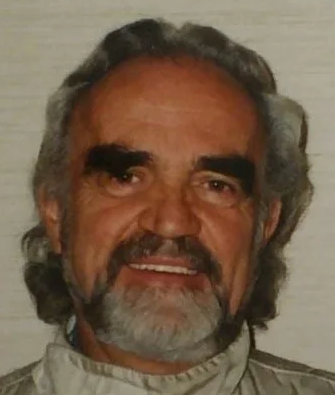
- Terry Capp
- Full name: Terry Capp

Awards
- 2001: Canadian Motorsport Hall of Fame

Terry Capp is a Canadian drag racer best known for his achievements in Top Fuel drag racing during the 1970s and 1980s. He gained international recognition after winning the prestigious Top Fuel championship at the 1980 NHRA U.S. Nationals in Indianapolis Indiana, one of the most significant victories in Canadian drag racing history.

== Early career ==
Capp’s drag racing career began in 1967 in Edmonton, Alberta, when he teamed up with Bernie Fedderly, a partnership that would become one of the most successful in Canadian motorsport. Their first car, a 1951 Anglia B/Gasser, quickly made an impression by winning the Western Canadian Championship Series in its debut season.

Over the next few years, Capp and Fedderly progressed through increasingly competitive classes, including C/Gas and A/Gas, before stepping into the A/Fuel Dragster category in 1970. This move introduced them to the world of nitromethane-fueled engines and open-wheel dragsters. Their technical prowess and competitive spirit were evident when they partnered with Wes Van Dusen and acquired a Top Fuel dragster. At Saskatchewan International Raceway, Capp set a Canadian Top Fuel record with a 6.42-second pass at 225 mph.

In 1972, encouraged by fellow drag racer Gary Beck, Capp’s team adopted the then-novel rear-engine dragster design, which offered improved safety and performance. That same year, Capp became the first Canadian to finish in the Top Ten of the NHRA World Championship Series, a groundbreaking achievement that elevated Canada’s profile in the international drag racing community. At the end of the 1972 campaign, they finished in the top-ten of the NHRA World Championship Series—an unprecedented feat for a Canadian team at the time.

Throughout the 1970s, Capp’s cars were frequently featured in National Dragster magazine, and he became a respected figure at major NHRA events across North America. His early success laid the foundation for what would become a legendary career in Top Fuel drag racing.

== 1980 US Nationals Victory ==
Capp’s crowning achievement came at the 1980 NHRA U.S. Nationals. After qualifying second with a 5.80-second elapsed time at 243.24 mph, he defeated Jeb Allen in the final round with a 5.82-second run at 241.93 mph. The race was hailed as the quickest side-by-side Top Fuel final in history at the time.

== Later career and legacy ==
Though he entered semi-retirement after 1980, Capp returned to Top Fuel racing in 1988 with a new team including Ron Hodgson, Gordon Jenner, and Dale Adams. That year, he won the AHRA World Finals in Spokane and returned to the U.S. Nationals, qualifying ninth. He continued to compete in match races across North America into the 1990s and 2000s, maintaining his Top Fuel and Funny Car licenses.

In 2004, Capp set a Canadian quarter-mile speed record of 319.78 mph in 4.72 seconds while driving the Royal Canadian dragster, further cementing his status as one of Canada’s fastest racers.
