= NMCA =

NMCA may refer to:

- National Mapping and Cadastral Agency, an organisation that produces topographic maps and geographic information of a country
- National Marine Conservation Areas, marine areas in Canada
- National Michael Chekhov Association, a dancing association; see Mala Powers § National Michael Chekhov Association (NMCA)
- National Muscle Car Association, a car association; see Ford Modular engine § World records
- National Museum of Ceramic Art, a former museum in Maryland
- National Museum of Commercial Aviation, a former museum in the U.S. state of Georgia
- Nikolaev military-civilian administration
