= Jim Thompson (powerboat racing) =

Canadian engineer (1926–2021)

James "Jim" G. Thompson
- Born: December 18, 1926; London, Ontario, Canada
- Died: May 13, 2021 (aged 94) London, Ontario, Canada
- Allegiance: Canada
- Branch: Canadian Forces
- Service years: 1940–1944, 1979–1999
- Rank: Colonel
- Commands: 1st Hussars Regiment (RCAC)
- Other work: Businessman, philanthropist, and sportsman

James G. Thompson (December 18, 1926 – May 13, 2021) was a Canadian businessman, philanthropist, and sportsman. He was best known for designing and building the Miss Supertest hydroplanes.

Thompson was born in London, Ontario, to "Colonel" J. Gordon Thompson and Essie McCreery. The couple also had two daughters named Catherine and Essie. Thompson's father was a businessman involved in the manufacturing of gasoline pumps and, subsequently, the selling of gasoline, a sportsman and a golfer, who founded the Sunningdale Golf and Country Club. The Thompson Recreation and Athletic Centre at Western in London, Ontario, was named in his honour.

Thompson attended primary school in London and secondary school in St. Catharines, Ontario at Ridley College. In 1944, he graduated as a naval officer from the Royal Canadian Naval College/Royal Roads Military College. Thompson also spent two years studying engineering at the University of Toronto, and one year studying business at the University of Western Ontario. While attending the University of Toronto (Engineering) and the University of Western Ontario (Business), he continued to serve with the Naval Reserve on HMCS York and HMCS Prevost.

In the late 1950s and early 1960s, he competed in unlimited hydroplane racing. In 1950, Thompson and his father bought a hydroplane named Miss Canada IV from a retired racer named Harold Wilson. The Thompsons later renamed the boat Miss Supertest I and refurbished it. However, mechanical problems would lead Thompson to abandon Miss Supertest I and set his sights on designing and building a new boat. In 1954, he and his team built Miss Supertest II. She was 31 feet (9.4 m) long, 12 feet (3.7 m) wide, and equipped with a 2,000 horsepower (1,500 kW) Rolls-Royce Griffon motor. On November 1, 1957, Miss Supertest II set a world Canadian and British Empire speed record for propeller-driven craft straightaway speed record of 184.494 miles per hour (296.914 km/h) in Picton, Ontario. Miss Supertest II was retired the following year, and Thompson began designing his next boat.

Miss Supertest III, which also featured a 2,000 horsepower (1,500 kW) Rolls-Royce Griffon engine, was designed specifically to compete for the Harmsworth Cup. Miss Supertest III was christened in 1959 and went on to win the 1959 Detroit Memorial Regatta and the Harmsworth Cup in 1959, 1960 and 1961. When Miss Supertest III won the 1959 Harmsworth Trophy for Canada it ended 39 years of American domination. When Miss Supertest III's pilot, Bob Hayward, was killed in 1961 while driving Miss Supertest II in the Detroit River Silver Cup races in 1961, Thompson retired from racing. He said: "With the untimely death of Bob Hayward, the members of our racing team would derive little satisfaction from further success."

In 1959, Thompson was elected into Canada's Sports Hall of Fame and inducted in 1960. During the same year he received the Medal of Honour from the Union of International Motorboating. He also became the president of Supertest Petroleum, a position he held until the company was purchased by BP in 1971.

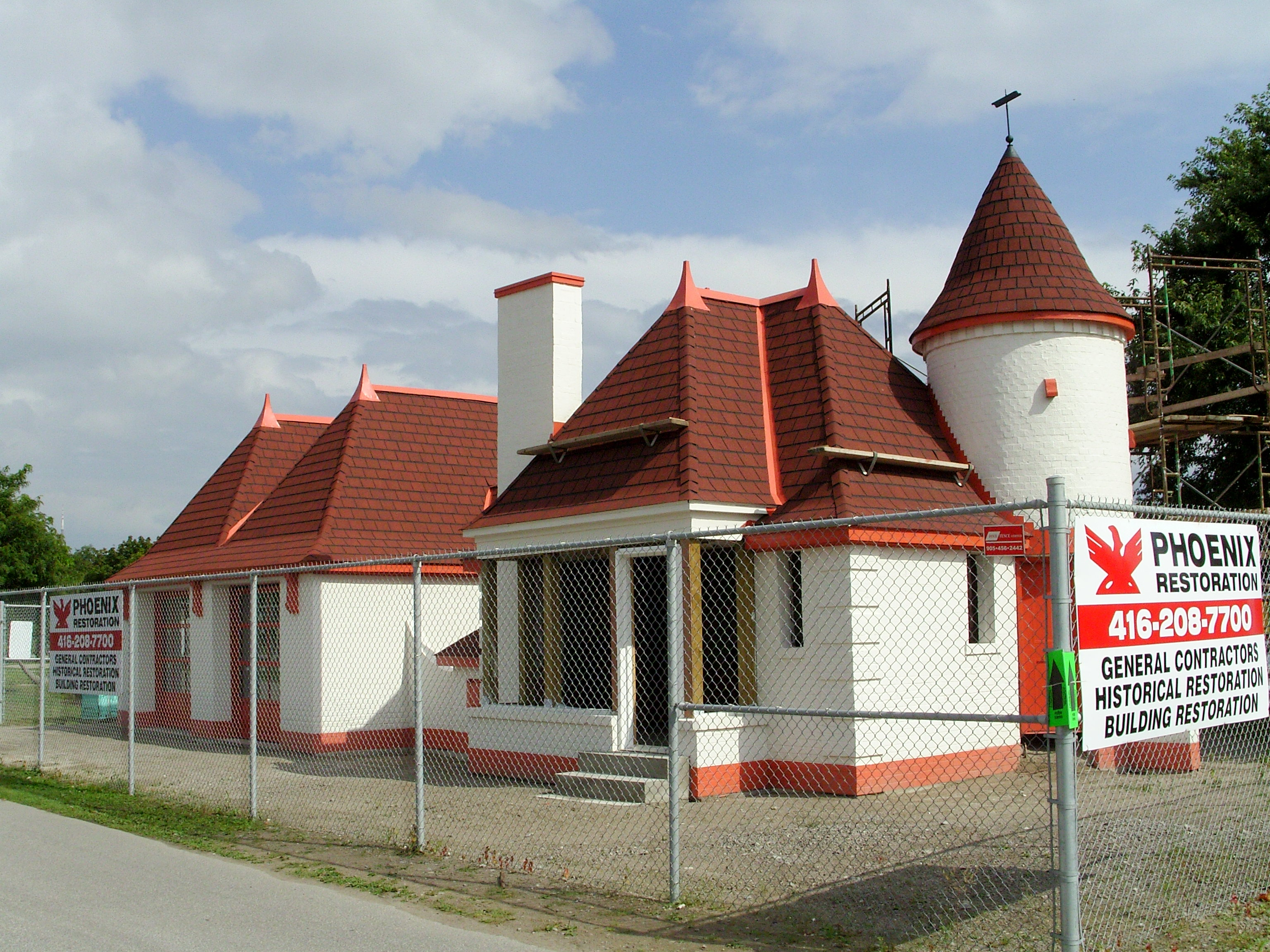
Lakeshore Toronto; Joy Gas Station, not Supertest

Thompson was inducted into the Canadian Boating Federation Hall of Fame in 1995. In 2005, he was inducted into the Canadian Motorsport Hall of Fame, along with the London Sports Hall of Fame.

Thompson served as honorary Colonel of the 1st Hussars Regiment (RCAC) from 1979 to 1999.

Thompson was also involved in the operations of the golf course that his father co-founded in London, Ontario, during the Great Depression. He was appointed Chairman of the Building and Construction Committee at Sunningdale Golf and Country Club in 1972. He initiated and completed a study on water requirements and clubhouse expansion needs for future years. In 1983 he was elected President of the Club. Later, he served as chair of the Greens Committee.

After retiring, Thompson lived in London, Ontario, with his wife Beverly. The couple supported a number of local charities. They had five children and 15 grandchildren. Jim Thompson died in London, Ontario on May 13, 2021, at the age of 94.

Canada Post issued a commemorative stamp in August 2011 honouring the hydroplane Miss Supertest III, her driver Bob Hayward and businessman Jim Thompson, who designed and built her.
