= Warren Coniam =

Canadian motorsport racer

Warren Coniam is a Canadian Super Modified racer who was inducted into the Canadian Motorsport Hall of Fame in 1996.

== See also ==
- Motorsport in Canada
