= Jack Christie =

Jack Christie may refer to:

- Jack Christie (racing driver)
- Jack Christie (bowls)
- Jack Christie (musician)
