= Groupe de Développement Sportif =

Pagali Neelu

- Abbreviation: GDS
- Formation: 2020
- Type: Sports federation
- Purpose: Motorsports
- Headquarters: 200, circuit Gilles-Villeneuve; Montreal, Quebec; H3C 1A9
- Region served: Canada
- Members: 6
- President: François Dumontier
- Affiliations: FIA; CACC; WCMA; CASC-OR; ASQ; ARMS; CARS
- Website: www.asncanada.ca

Groupe de Développement Sportif (GDS; "Sports Development Group") is Canada's national motorsport authority, as delegated by the FIA.

In April 2020, the FIA (Fédération Internationale de l’Automobile) announced the appointment of GDS (Groupe de Développement Sportif) as the new National Sporting Authority in Canada. The organization took over from ASN Canada FIA, which resigned in December 2019.

== Regional Territories ==
There are five territories and one national rally group to administer amateur motor sport in Canada:

- Canadian Association of Car Clubs (CACC) – British Columbia
- Western Canada Motorsport Association (WCMA) – Western Canada
- Canadian Automobile Sport Clubs Ontario Region (CASC-OR) – Ontario
- Auto Sport Québec (ASQ) – Québec
- Atlantic Region Motor Sports Inc. (ARMS) – Atlantic Canada
- Canadian Association of Rally Sport (CARS) – National Rally organization
