= Bob Hayward =

Bob Hayward.

Robert D. Hayward (October 28, 1927 - September 10, 1961) was a Canadian powerboat racer who was a three-time winner of the Harmsworth Cup as the pilot of Miss Supertest III.

From Embro, Ontario, Hayward was raised on his family's chicken farm and joined the Supertest racing team as a mechanic in 1957. Piloting Miss Supertest III, Hayward won the Harmsworth Cup in 1959, 1960, and 1961. A month after winning his third Harmsworth Cup, Hayward was killed while racing Miss Supertest II at the Silver Cup regatta on the Detroit River. The boat flipped over at 175 mph, breaking Hayward's neck. He was 33 years old. After his death, the Supertest team retired from racing.

Hayward was inducted in the Canadian Motorsport Hall of Fame in 2000. A YMCA in London, Ontario, where he lived at the time of his death, is named after him. A stretch of water at the Bay of Quinte near Deseronto, Ontario is known as Hayward Long Reach. Hayward was inducted into Canada's Sports Hall of Fame in 1960.

Canada Post issued a commemorative stamp in 2011 honouring the hydroplane racingboat Miss Supertest III, her driver Bob Hayward and businessman Jim Thompson, who designed and built her.

Thistle Theatre, a community theatre company, in Hayward's home town of Embro, ON, put on an original play about his life, racing and death. Shows occurred in March 2024.
