= Rick Baker (disambiguation) =

Rick Baker (born 1950) is an American special makeup effects artist.

Rick Baker may also refer to:

- Rick Baker (mayor) (born 1956), former mayor of St. Petersburg, Florida
- "The Righteous Maker" Rick Baker (born 1982), American professional wrestler also known as D-Ray 3000

== See also ==
- Richard Baker (disambiguation)
