= Greed (disambiguation) =

Greed is an excessive desire to possess wealth or goods with the intention to keep it for one's self.

Greed may also refer to:

== Books ==
- Greed (Jelinek novel), a 2000 novel by Elfriede Jelinek
- Greed, a novel by Robin Wasserman
- Greed Magazine, a 1990s American music, comics, and culture periodical

== Film and television ==
- Greed (1924 film), a film by Erich von Stroheim
- Greed (2006 film), a film featuring Jason London
- Greed (2019 film), a satirical film by Michael Winterbottom
- Greed (game show), a 1999 American TV quiz show
  - Greed (UK game show), a British television quiz show
- WCW Greed, a professional wrestling pay-per-view TV show
- "Greed", a 1995 episode of 2point4 children

=== Characters ===
- Greed (Fullmetal Alchemist), a character in the Fullmetal Alchemist series
- Greed, a character in the allegorical poem Psychomachia by Prudentius
- Greeed, the villains from the Tokusatsu series Kamen Rider OOO

== Music ==
- Greed (Swans album), 1986
- Greed (Ambitious Lovers album), 1988
- Greed (Pulkas album), 1998
- "Greed" (song), a 2001 song by Godsmack
- "Greed", by Amorphis from Tuonela, 1999
- "Greed", by Laurent Garnier from Unreasonable Behaviour, 2000
- "Greed", by Meshuggah from Contradictions Collapse, 1991
- "Greed", by War of Ages from Void, 2019

== Other uses ==
- Greed in Christianity, one of the seven deadly sins
- Greed (dice game)
- Greedy algorithm

== See also ==
- Greedy (disambiguation)
