= Edward Mackay Edgar =

Canadian-British banker

Sir Edward Mackay Edgar Bt
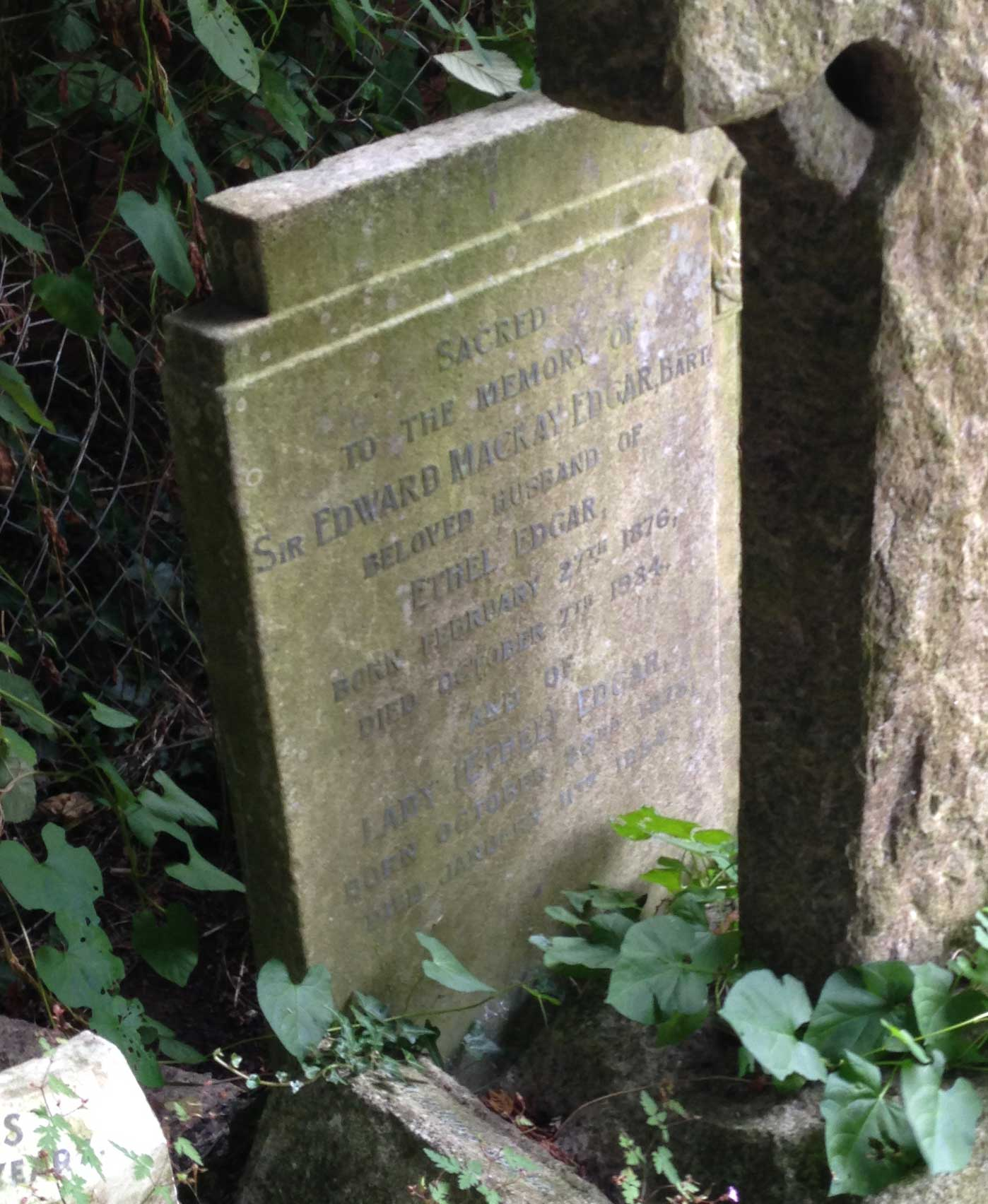
- Mackay Edgar's tombstone in Chalfont St Peter churchyard
- Born: 27 February 1876; Montreal, Canada
- Died: 7 October 1934 (aged 58); England
- Occupation: Banker

Sir Edward Mackay Edgar, 1st Baronet (27 February 1876 – 7 October 1934) was a Canadian-British banker.

Mackay Edgar was born in Montreal and educated at McGill University. He became a member of the Montreal Stock Exchange. In 1907 he went to Britain on business and stayed, joining Sperling & Co Ltd, merchant bankers, of Moorgate Street, London, in 1908 and later becoming a senior partner. In 1917, he became chairman of British Controlled Oilfields Ltd, remaining in the post until 1925. He was created a baronet in the 1920 New Year Honours, largely due to his services to British-Canadian trade.

His financial affairs ran into trouble in 1925 and he went into receivership, although this was rescinded the following year. He left Sperlings at this time and organised his own company, E. Mackay Edgar Ltd, with offices in London, Montreal and New York City. This ended when he retired due to ill-health, but in 1928 he returned with a new company, Beeston's Trust Ltd, which folded during the Depression and in 1931 he again went into receivership.

Mackay Edgar was also a notable figure in powerboat racing, owning a number of winning boats. He won the Harmsworth Trophy for two consecutive years (1912 and 1913) with his boat Maple Leaf IV.

Mackay Edgar's only son, John, was killed in a car accident in July 1925 and the baronetcy therefore became extinct upon his death.

Mackay Edgar and his wife, Ethel Beatrice (née Pinder), a fellow native of Montreal whom he married in 1902, are buried in the cemetery in Chalfont St Peter, Buckinghamshire.

== Footnotes ==
Baronetage of the United Kingdom
New creation	Baronet (of Chalfont); 1920–1934	Extinct
