= David Greenblatt =

Canadian racecar builder

- Born: May 16, 1938
- Died: August 16, 2009 (aged 71)

David Greenblatt (May 16, 1938 – August 16, 2009) was a Canadian race car driver and builder of sports cars who was inducted into the Canadian Motorsport Hall of Fame in 1998.

He is the father of Melissa Richard-Greenblatt, Liane Greenblatt, and Samantha Burns. He is the uncle of Simon Baron Cohen and Sacha Baron Cohen.
