= Bob McLean (racing driver) =

Robert Lewis McLean (September 24, 1933, in Australia – March 26, 1966) was a Canadian racing driver. McLean's driving career culminated in 1965 with the Canadian Driving Championship title. McLean died in 1966 at the Sebring International Raceway during an endurance race while driving a Ford GT40.

== Early years ==
Bob McLean started his driving career in 1957 with an MGA, racing frequently at his home track, the very new Westwood Racing Circuit in Coquitlam, located close to his hometown of Vancouver, British Columbia, Canada. By all measures, McLean was well liked and respected on the road racing circuits. Bob first met Stirling Moss at Sebring in 1959 when Jack Brabham won the world championship.

In March 1961 McLean attended Rob Walker's Motor Racing Stables at Finmere Aerodrome circuit in England. He did the first three stages on his first trip and made a second trip to England where he completed the last three stages. At the completion of the seventeen-day training course, McLean turned the fastest ever student lap time. Students must progress from class six through to class one by meeting a steadily decreasing lap time requirement at each level.

When he first started racing, his mechanic was Colin Wilson, a fellow Australian, who also worked at the "Royalite" gas station that Bob ran at 24th and Oak St. in Vancouver, British Columbia, Canada. When Colin returned to Australia, Brian Dunlop was Bob's mechanic and remained so until Bob was killed. Bob also worked part-time at a tire store, which was a sponsor of his.

In 1962 moved to his BMC A-series-engined number "101" Cooper Formula Junior. Through 1962–63 McLean managed nineteen wins out of twenty-two starts, racing the Cooper at venues from Westwood to Monterey, California. In 1964 McLean moved to a 1.6 litre twin-cam powered Lotus 23B, with which he competed in the under two-litre class.

In 1965, McLean set out with his Lotus to conquer the Canadian Driving Championships, a venture which would see him travel extensively. By air and by ground he travelled to every national event that year, covering nearly 100,000 kilometres. After a season of dominant performances, he was successful at winning the Championship, a remarkable accomplishment considering the eastern Canadian "establishment" drivers and their bigger and faster cars. It was in April of this same year that he met Stirling Moss during Moss's trip to Vancouver.

== Final year ==
Early in 1966, Bob McLean earned a spot with the Comstock Racing Team, a Canadian endurance-racing team. Sharing the driving with fellow Canadian driver Jean Oulette, they piloted one of the team's two Ford GT40s in the 16th Annual Sebring 12 Hour Grand Prix of Endurance for the Alitalia Cup race at Sebring International Raceway in Sebring, Florida, United States of America. This was a showdown battle between Ford and Ferrari. Shortly after McLean took over driving duties in the fourth hour of the race, his Ford GT40 crashed into a utility power pole and exploded into flames, killing McLean.

Bob McLean left behind his wife Kathie and their two young children. McLean's death was a huge blow to the motorsport community. The funeral procession to his final resting place in Burnaby included a line of cars that reportedly stretched out some two miles, a testament to the fact that he was well admired. McLean was inducted into the Canadian Motorsport Hall of Fame in Toronto in 1993. Despite references to the contrary, Bob McLean has never been inducted into the BC Sports Hall of Fame. In more recent years, McLean was featured in a Peter Lipskis documentary entitled King of Westwood.

== Sources ==
- Johnston, Tom (2006) Sports Car Road Racing in Western Canada, Granville Island Publishing, ISBN 1-894694-19-8
- Bob McLean, Canada, , Retrieved November 12, 2006.
- Bob McLean, Pioneer – Sports Car and Road Racing – Inducted 2003, Greater Vancouver Motorsport Pioneers Society, 2006. Excerpts from Canada Track & Traffic January 1966 and May 1966, edited by Tom Johnston, 2004
- Bob McLean, Canadian Motorsport Hall of Fame inductee, 1993.
- Langton-Adams, John E., Canadian Track & Traffic, September, 1961
- Bone, Peter, "Racing School Report", Canada Track & Traffic, Volume 3, Number 7, March, 1962: 32
