= Bastedo =

Bastedo is a surname. Notable people with the surname include:

- Alexandra Bastedo (1946–2014), British actress
- Frank Lindsay Bastedo (1886–1973), Lieutenant Governor of Saskatchewan
- Larry Bastedo (fl. 1950s–2010s), Canadian motorcycle racer
