= Hugh E. Scully =

Canadian surgeon

Dr. Hugh E. Scully is a Canadian surgeon who is involved with motorsport medical care. He was inducted into the Canadian Motorsport Hall of Fame in 1991 for his contributions to motorsport worldwide.

Scully earned his medical degree at Queen's University in Kingston, Ontario. He trained in cardiac surgery at hospitals affiliated with the University of Toronto and Harvard University.

Scully founded the Ontario Race Physicians and the Professional Association of Internes and Residents of Ontario, performed surgery at Toronto General Hospital, and was professor of surgery at the University of Toronto. Scully served as a president of the Ontario Medical Association, the Canadian Medical Association and the International Council of Motorsport Sciences.
