= Wallie Branston =

Canadian racing driver (1923–2013)

Wallie Branston (October 11, 1923 – November 7, 2013) was a Canadian race car driver from Scarborough, Ontario, who was inducted into the Canadian Motorsport Hall of Fame in 1997. Branston was a pioneering stock car driver and later became the official starter at Mosport Park. He also competed in one NASCAR Cup Series race in 1954.
