= National Museum of Ceramic Art =

Art museum in Baltimore, Maryland, US

Coordinates: 39°17′11″N 76°37′7″W

The National Museum of Ceramic Art (N.M.C.A.) was a non-profit arts institution active in downtown Baltimore, Maryland, in operation from 1989 until 1993.

== About ==
Located at 250 West Pratt Street near Baltimore's Inner Harbor, the art museum displayed a variety of earthenware, stoneware, porcelain and glass. Although most of its exhibits were American and contemporary (with an emphasis sometimes on the Atlantic coast), it also displayed ancient and medieval ceramic arts from Europe, Asia, Africa and the Americas. Occasionally, the museum sponsored judged competitions of artists from around the U.S. Eastern coast.

The street-level, glass-walled museum opened its doors in 1989, and was active until late 1993. It closed after the 1992 opening of the Baltimore Orioles baseball stadium across the street at Camden Yards. A drop in public revenue from the city and state and a decline in donations and visitors were the cause of its closure.

The institution's very first exhibition was "Surface and Form" in 1989. Many photographs of the ceramics shown then have been publicly posted. One of the ceramic museum's early exhibits was "Ceramic Sculptures" (September 1990). A display of glass objects was provided in "Personal Vision / Diverse Images: An Exhibition of Recent Sculptural Glass" (February 1991). Among the artists represented was glass sculpturist Dale Chihuly. A "Regional Juried Exhibition" was held in August 1991. The jurors included William Daley and curator Frederick Brandt. A subsequent exhibition was "Maryland Collects" (November 1991) which featured clay artists such as Gertrud and Otto Natzler. The exhibit "Three in Clay" (March 1992) included works by potter Paula Winokur. In May 1992, the pottery museum displayed "18th and 19th Century Utilitarian Porcelain and Pottery," one of its more geographically diverse exhibitions. Artists of Norway were featured in "Contemporary Norwegian Ceramics" (October 1992). In January 1993 various daylong workshops were provided to students of varying ages. A show of wildly artistic teapots was highlighted as "The Tea Party" in February 1993. One of the museum's final exhibits was "Jack Lenor Larsen: Designer / Collector -- A Retrospective" (June 1993), an exhibit featuring both terracotta and textiles.

The director of this institution, sometimes later called the National Museum of Ceramic Art and Glass, was Shirley B. Brown, while the full-time administrator was Dr. Ralph W. Bastedo, and the president of the board of trustees was J. Richard N. Tyler.
