= Gerald Donaldson =

Canadian biographer (1938–2025)

- Born: July 18, 1938; Almonte, Ontario, Canada
- Died: December 14, 2025 (aged 87); Toronto, Ontario, Canada
- Education: Ontario College of Art
- Occupations: Journalist, biographer
- Spouse(s): Betty Stewart; Diane Fine
- Parent(s): David Donaldson; Mary Purdon

Gerald Donaldson (July 18, 1938 – December 14, 2025) was a Canadian sports journalist and biographer who specialized in covering Formula One. He authored over 20 books, some republished multiple times.

Born in Almonte, Ontario, Canada to David Alexander Donaldson and Mary Enid Donaldson (née Purdon), he dropped out of high school and later attended the Ontario College of Art as a mature student between years of independent travel in Canada, Mexico and France. Donaldson did three of four races of racing in Canada, driving a Sprite, a Honda S600 and a Lotus 51 Formula Ford car. He began his career as an advertising copywriter and later became a sports journalist, writing for such publications as The Globe and Mail and the Toronto Star. From 1977, he focused on Formula One. Donaldson was the author of more than 20 books, including biographies of individuals such as drivers Gilles Villeneuve, James Hunt and Juan Manuel Fangio, and entries of world champions on Formula One's official website. He appeared on the Canadian television networks TSN, CTV and CBC. He was a member of the Writers' Union of Canada, and inducted into the Canadian Motorsport Hall of Fame in 2018, and in the Formula 1 Paddock Hall of Fame. Later in life, he lived in Chipping Campden, England with his second wife, Diane Fine, a Canadian artist. He died at the age of 87.

== Works ==
- Donaldson, Gerald (1989). Gilles Villeneuve: The Life of the Legendary Racing Driver. Motor Racing Publications.
- Donaldson, Gerald (1990). Grand Prix People: Revelations from Inside the Formula 1 Circus. Motor Racing Publications. ISBN 978-0947981532.
- Donaldson, Gerald (1994). James Hunt: The Biography. London, U.K.: Virgin Books. ISBN 978-0-7535-1823-6.
- Donadson, Gerald (2003). Fangio: The Life Behind the Legend. London, U.K.: Virgin Books. ISBN 978-1852270834.
