= Norris McDonald (journalist) =

Canadian journalist (1942–2023)

Norris A. McDonald
- Born: November 19, 1942; Toronto
- Died: November 26, 2023 (aged 81); Toronto
- Occupation: Journalist
- Years active: 54
- Children: 3

Norris McDonald (November 19, 1942 – November 26, 2023) was a Canadian journalist and member of the Canadian Motorsport Hall of Fame.

McDonald was automotive editor of the Toronto Star, Canada's largest-circulation newspaper, where he was responsible for the Saturday Wheels section and the newspaper's automotive website. He was also the Star's motorsport reporter and columnist. He was previously news editor and entertainment editor of the Star, news editor and assistant foreign editor of the Globe and Mail, and editorial page editor and associate editor of the Kingston Whig-Standard, where he also wrote a humour column. Early in his career, he wrote sports for the Pembroke Daily Observer and was a general assignment reporter on the Orillia Packet & Times.

== Biography ==
=== Early life ===
Born in Toronto, McDonald flunked out of Stamford Collegiate in Niagara Falls, Ontario, in 1962 after spending seven years there and never getting past Grade 11. In 1969, he graduated from Sir George Williams University (now Concordia University) in Montreal where he'd been admitted as a mature student. Named to the Honour Roll in his graduating year, his thesis in sociology, "Prostitutes are Human Beings—An Organized Counter-Institution," written with Clive L. Copeland, was subsequently published by Random House in the 1971 textbook Deviance, Reality and Change, edited by H. Taylor Buckner.

=== Career ===
His first newspaper job, beginning at age 19 at the Orillia Packet & Times, saw him cover his first auto race, on the ice of Lake Couchiching during the 1962 Orillia Winter Carnival. He covered his first Indianapolis 500 in 1969 and his first Formula One Canadian Grand Prix in 1970, both for the Globe and Mail. He joined the Toronto Star in 1973. In 1974, he covered Evel Knievel’s attempted jump of a 1,780-foot wide Idaho canyon.

In 1982, believing strongly that journalists should know everything about who and what they cover and finding himself writing more and more about auto racing, McDonald went racing himself in a high-speed, high-expense class of open-wheel, open-cockpit car and competition called supermodified racing. Freely admitting he wasn't very good but noting that he was never black-flagged, McDonald went racing one night, only to be asked to fill in for an absent trackside announcer at Oswego Speedway on the shores of Lake Ontario in northern New York state. Putting his journalistic skills to work in interviewing drivers and reporting from "the pits," McDonald proved to be successful and popular and did the infield announcing job at the "Home of the Supermodifieds" for close to 15 years.

Although he was always employed by newspapers, he also appeared on radio and television. His racing program, Motorsport Radio, co-hosted by Jim Martyn, was carried by Toronto all-sports station The Fan 590 in the early 2000s. While in Kingston, Ontario, he hosted a television program, Feedback Live, that won critical acclaim from Canadian broadcasting legend Peter Trueman. Writing in his column in the Toronto Star's Star Week TV magazine, Trueman said: “McDonald—an old-time newshound with Runyonesque overtones—is a natural on television.”

=== Personal life and death ===
McDonald was the father of three children, Cameron, Carolina and Duncan, and lived with his partner, Susan Greene, in Mississauga, Ontario.

In 1968, McDonald co-wrote, co-record and co-produced a campaign song for federal Progressive Conservative leader Robert Stanfield called "The Man From Nova Scotia." The song was banned by the CRTC for violating election laws.

Norris McDonald died on November 26, 2023, at the age of 81.

== Honours and awards ==
For his stories and columns on amateur/non-professional racing and racers, many of whom would never expect to be profiled in the country's biggest newspaper, McDonald was honoured in 2006 by being presented with the Canadian Automobile Sport Club's Media Award.

For his efforts at the "Steel Palace," he was inducted into the Oswego Speedway Hall of Fame in 2010.

The highlight of his motorsport career came in 2014 when he became the first journalist to be inducted into the Canadian Motorsport Hall of Fame in a class that included woman racing pioneer Diana Carter, administrator John Magill, road-racing champion Scott Maxwell, Indy racing star Paul Tracy and international inductee Nigel Mansell.
