= Bernie Fedderly =

Canadian drag racing crew chief (1942–2025)

Bernie Fedderly (February 20, 1942 – March 15, 2025) was a Canadian drag racing crew chief who was the crew chief for John Force's Funny Car. Bernie was inducted into the Canadian Motorsport Hall of Fame in 1996. Fedderly was born on February 20, 1942, and died on March 15, 2025, at the age of 83.
