= Henry De Gruchy =

Australian cricketer (1898–1952)

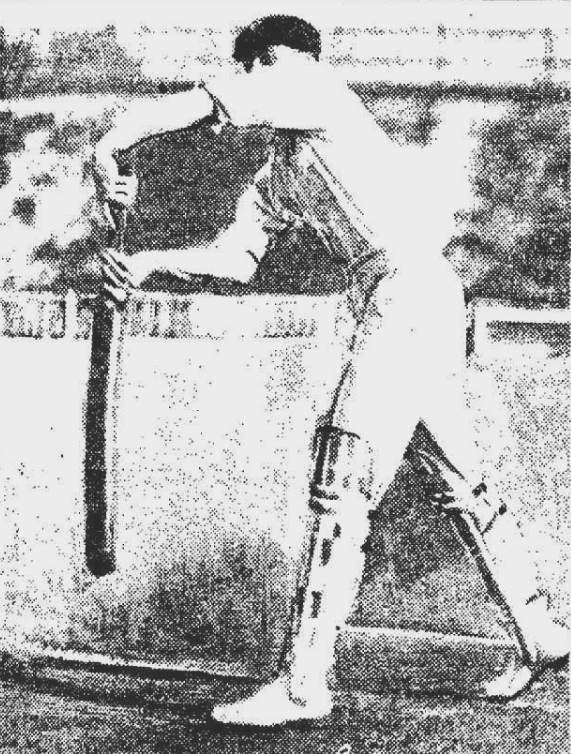

Personal information
- Born: 15 May 1898; Sydney, Australia
- Died: 2 May 1952 (aged 53); Melbourne, Australia

Domestic team information
- Years: Team
- 1924: Victoria
- Source: Cricinfo, 20 November 2015

Henry De Gruchy (15 May 1898 – 2 May 1952) was an Australian cricketer. He played one first-class cricket match for Victoria in 1924. He was a batting all-rounder, regarded as a useful change bowler but not a wicket taker.

In district cricket he played for Carlton, first representing the club in the Metropolitan League when he was just eleven and he was a regular in the district team from the 1917–18 season. In 1924, he was selected as captain of a Victorian youth side which played against a South Australian youth side, and in February 1924 he represented Victoria in a first-class game against Tasmania. His Carlton career lasted twenty years, during which he often opening the batting with Bill Woodfull, and he became a life member of the club. He also played baseball for Carlton and Victoria.

== See also ==
- List of Victoria first-class cricketers
