= John De Gruchy =

Canadian motorcycle racer

De Gruchy, John
- Born: 1935 est Canada
- Current team: Unsigned
- Bike number: -

John De Gruchy is a Canadian motorcycle racer who was active from 1957 until his retirement in 1974. De Gruchy was inducted into the Canadian Motorsport Hall of Fame in 2005.
