= Motorsport in Canada =

Motorsports are a popular physically demanding sport competed in many countries worldwide, including in Canada. One of the most internationally significant Canadian events is the Canadian Grand Prix, a race for the Formula One World Championship. Ongoing since 1967. Lance Stroll is the only Canadian competing in the series in 2026.

Other prominent national competitions of today include the NASCAR Canada Series, which began in 2007 and is a remake of the 1981 stock-car racing CASCAR Super Series, and the IMSA GT3 Cup Challenge, which started in 2011 for semi-professional drivers to race their Porsche 911 GT3s. Aside from this, series such as the Indy NXT and USF Pro 2000 Championship have also previously held races in Canada.

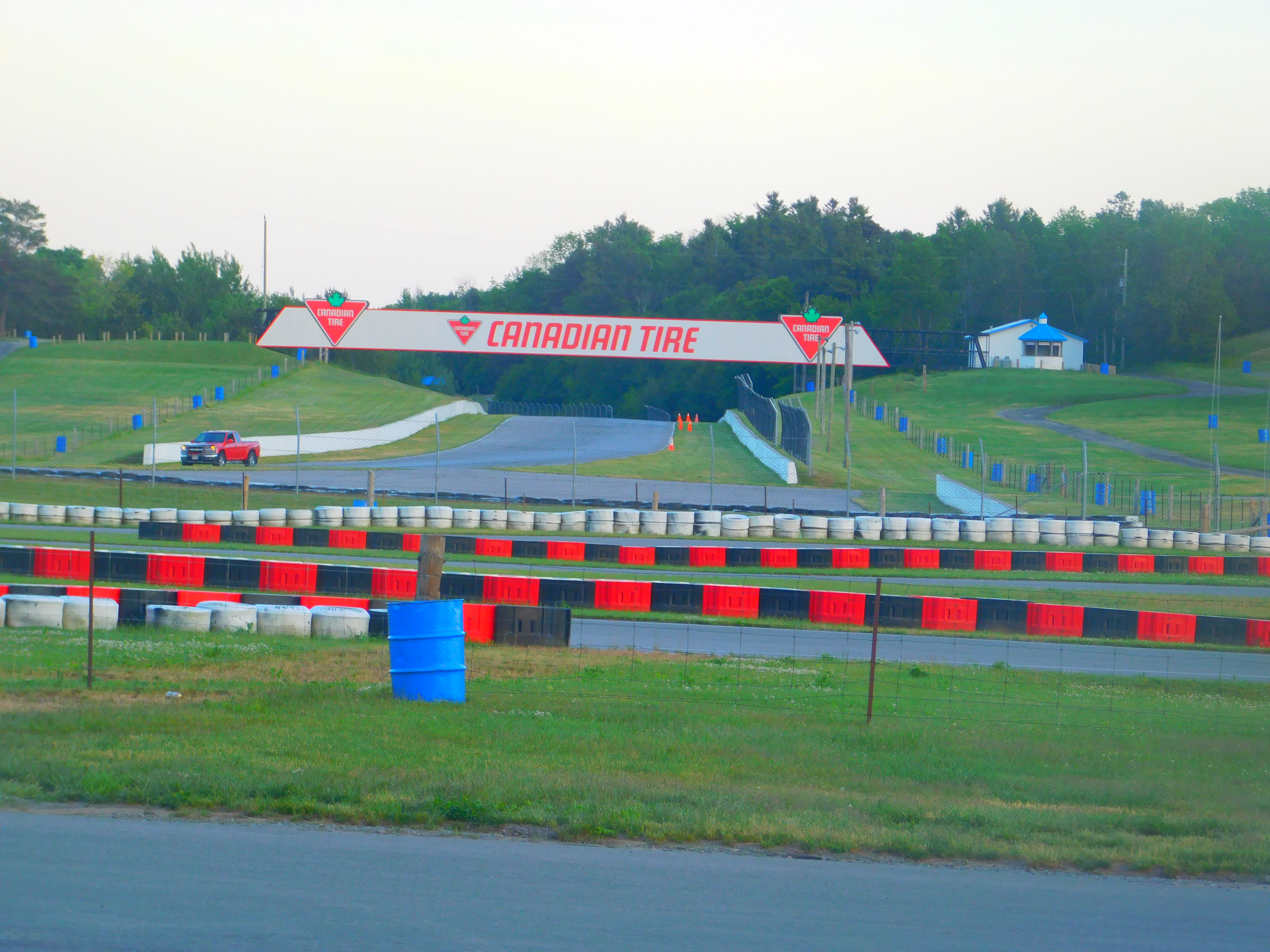
Mosport Park (Now the Canadian Tire Motorsport Park), home of the first Canadian Formula One Grand Prix

== History ==
Since the invention of the contemporary automobile, the first recorded instance of motorsport in Canada was a sixty-kilometre race dubbed as a ‘speed trial’ from the cities of Toronto to Hamilton in 1900. The first official race was held in Fort Erie, by the American Buffalo Auto Club. Other smaller races would be held throughout the early twentieth century, such as the Canadian National Exhibition championships in the 1920s. During this period, smaller, unofficial clubs were formed by locals who were interested in the auto racing industry that was developing in Canada.

In the post-war economy present at the time, activities of leisure came to be and people utilized their technical skills learned from the war in regard to this. Individual vehicle ownership rose within the middle-class population, so self-repairs on one's car for the purpose of improving performance whilst saving costs became the norm, which eventually evolved to a hobby for many. With the various amounts of auto tinkering done, the act of racing of cars naturally occurred, leading to amateur racing events to become a growing sport within communities of enthusiasts.

In hopes of being more internationally recognized and running an event of a larger scale than what currently existed, several members of indie automobile clubs, the St Lawrence Automobile Club, Sports Car Club, and Sport Motor Car Club gathered to form the Canadian Automobile Sport Committee (CASC) in 1951. It grew to be a larger and more professional club that catered toward motorsports throughout the country, where other smaller clubs amalgamated to it. By the 1970s, its membership had grown to over five thousand, from the hundreds of other independent clubs who had decided to follow in the footsteps of the club's founders' joining.

Jim Gunn, one of the CASC's founders, played a vital role in its early development, through promoting the club and working to have it involved in the first Trans-Canada Rally. Within the next few years, more motorsport events debut, and the CASC was eventually acknowledged by the Fédération Internationale de l'Automobile (FIA) as a national authority of Canada's motorsports. Through this official approval, Canada was able to host its first international motorsport event, the Formula One World Championship.

With the notion of motorsport becoming mainstream after this large addition to the roster of auto races within the country, by the end of the twentieth century, the defining characteristics of Canada's motorsports became one of professional competition and commercialization. Rather than the constant of amateur, small races that were once held, large competitions with sponsors and payments came to be. Due to this change, members of the CASC came into conflict regarding the club's ideals, and eventually, it lost its influence and position of leadership.

== Formula One ==
After several years of contingency, Canada was finally recognized by the FIA in 1967. From its involvement in founding the Can-Am series to continuous years of hosting professional races and the like, it was decided that Canada would become the home of the newest Formula One Grand Prix. Its debut location would be at the Mosport Park circuit (now renamed the Canadian Tire Motorsport Park), with a portion of the costs required covered by Imperial Tobacco as a first-time sponsor of the event. Over the next few years, the Grand Prix locations would switch between Mosport Park and Circuit Mont-Tremblant until in 1977, the grand prix would be held at Mosport Park for the last time due to track safety concerns of dangerous turns.

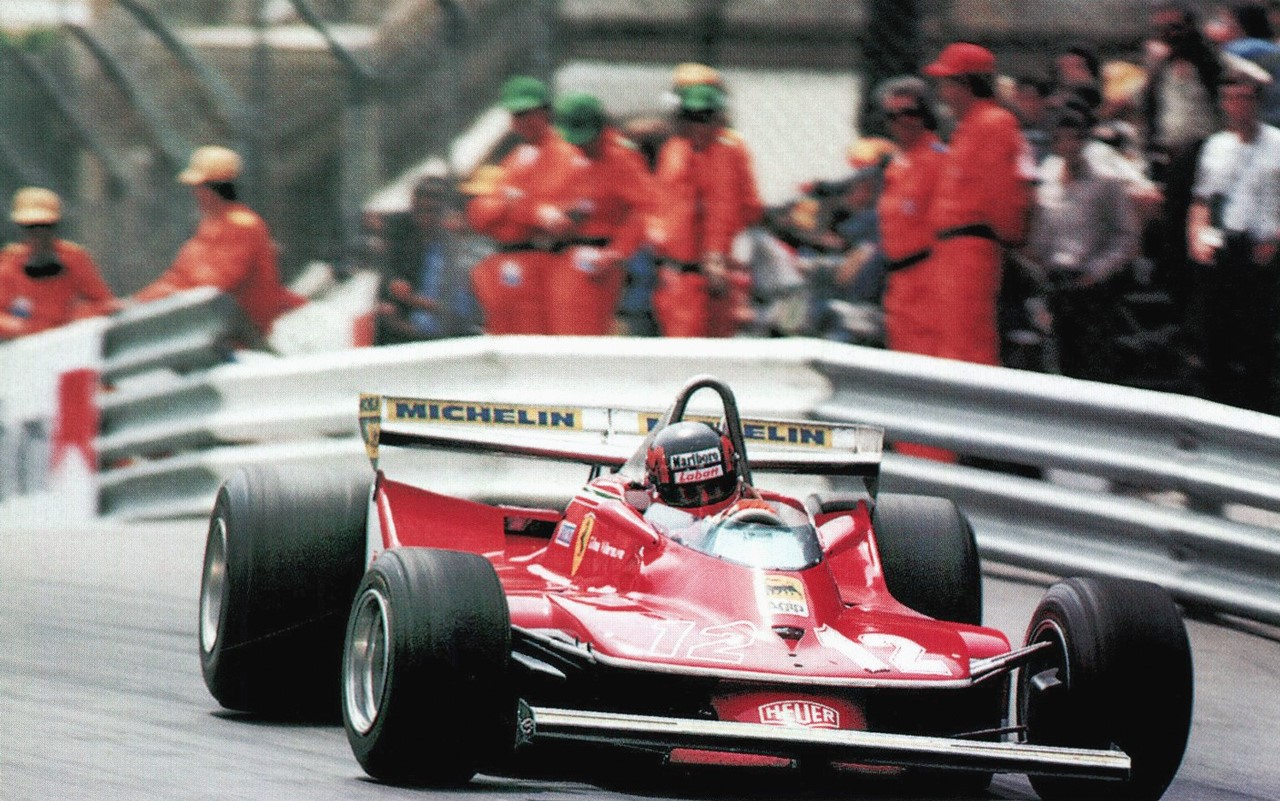
Gilles Villeneuve driving a Ferrari 312T in the 1979 Monaco Grand Prix

The following year, the 1978 Canadian Grand Prix was held at the Circuit Île Notre-Dame in Montreal, a newly constructed track built that year where Canadian driver Gilles Villeneuve became its first victor. Although he did not win again, Villeneuve continued to be a participant in the following Canadian Grand Prix races and Formula One World Championships, until his death in 1982, after a qualifying accident for the Belgium Grand Prix. In response, the Circuit Île Notre-Dame was renamed to the Circuit Gilles Villeneuve, in honour of his participance and impact on the Canadian Formula One scene.

Although the Canadian Grand Prix takes place each year, there have been five recorded instances where it did not occur.

- 1975 – reason(s) unconfirmed
- 1987 – legal issues of sponsors
- 2009 – dispute between the circuit officials and commercial holders of Formula One
- 2020/2021 - COVID-19 pandemic

As of today, the Montreal Grand Prix remains active at the same location. As of the 2023 Formula One World Championship, the Canadian driver who currently participates in the Formula One World Championship is Lance Stroll of the Aston Martin team, although there are also other less prominent Canadian test drivers.

== NASCAR ==
Beginning in 1981, the Canadian Association for Stock Car Auto Racing (CASCAR) started the CASCAR EMCO Western Series, the CASCAR CARQUEST Sportsman Series, and its more prominent championship, the CASCAR Super Series, where stock cars would race across a mix of twelve different tracks and speedways across various regions of Canada each year. In 2004, the American-based National Association for Stock Car Auto Racing (NASCAR) and CASCAR collaborated, in an effort to increase interest of the sport. The agreement between the two groups would span for the next few years, leading to the revival and remake of the CASCAR Super Series.

As a result, the NASCAR Canadian Tire Series (NCATS) was formed and debut in 2007, with the Canadian Tire company as the primary sponsor. However, after nine years of partnership, Canadian Tire eventually pulled out in 2015, with the reason due to the little change and low coverage of the event. The series continued the proceeding year in 2016, and the Pinty's Delicious Foods company became the top sponsor, leading to the series’ name change to the NASCAR Pinty's Series. After being held on different tracks in Canada only, in 2018 the series added a race at the New Hampshire Motor Speedway in the United States, the first location to host a race outside of Canada.

== IndyCar ==
Another form of popular motorsport in Canada is IndyCar racing. In the past, single, one-time events relating to American-based competitions have taken place in the country, such as races for the Indy Lights Series, or the Indy Pro 2000 Championships. However, event locations tend to vary from each year, with most races being held in the U.S. on a permanent basis. In 1985, after decades of protest from locals and some city councillors, the proposal for a major, more significant IndyCar race was approved, with the condition that certain noise and crowd-control restrictions were met. They included a traffic plan, noise control, an authorization of event overseers, as well as a maximum of sixty-thousand guests who could attend. With the Molson brewing company as the largest sponsor, the event was titled the Molson Indy Toronto, which later changed to the Honda Indy Toronto when the Honda Racing Corporation replaced Molson as the primary sponsor.

== Other Competitions ==
Aside from the main international motorsport competitions that occur each year, Canada also hosts other motorsport races and events.

=== IMSA GT3 Cup Challenge ===
The IMSA GT3 Cup began in 2011 for the first time in Canada, as a result of a collaboration between Porsche Motorsports North America, Porsche Cars Canada and regulator of the event, the International Motor Sports Association (IMSA). As stated by a representative of the FIA, Canada was officially the 20th country to host this championship. A roster of approximately 30 rookie drivers raced on the Calabogie Motorsports Park track using their Porsche 911 GT3 race cars. Other side events were hosted in addition to the main performance, including races, live music, and a range of other activities. Besides the purpose of appealing to motorsport enthusiasts, the challenge is used to train amateur drivers for more difficult competitions. Most participants of this challenge are noted to be Canadians, with all but one of the current Platinum and Gold Class Champions being of the host country's nationality.

== Motorsport Culture ==
Motorsport has maintained a noticeable presence in Canada, from the various events and tracks that are ongoing or have previously existed.

=== Clubs ===
Such as how the CASC aided in founding Canada's motorsport industry, many nationally recognized clubs relating to auto racing still exist today.

- Canadian Automobile Association (CAA) – The CAA acts as a road service and insurance company today. Its roots trace back to the early twentieth century, where a small group of motorists formed the Toronto Automobile Club, before eventually changing its name to the Canadian Automobile Association. Aside from road services, CAA also offers travel and road insurance, auto-related publishings, and other collaborations involving new auto technologies.
- Canadian Automobile Sport Committee (CASC) – Founded in the mid twentieth century, this club is one of the oldest ongoing clubs. Previously a large contributor of Canada's motorsport developments, it was one of leading influences behind the approval of the Canadian Formula One Grand Prix in the 1960s.
- ASN Canada FIA (Former) – A former officially recognized club of the FIA based in Ontario, this Canadian motorsport regulator resigned due to its deauthorization in December 2019 from conflict within its leadership and operations. Despite this, current events related to it, such as the Montreal Grand Prix, have not been affected publicly.

=== Museums ===
- Canadian Automotive Museum – Started in 1962 by the Oshawa Chamber of Commerce as a project to promote tourism and motorsports, this museum is hosted inside former car dealership Jackson Motor Company. From various transitions within 1921 to 1962, the Canadian Automotive Museum was officially opened in 1963, and has been operating ever since. Today, it shares the story behind Canada's automotive manufacturing and consists of many European cars on display. A gift shop, event lot, and reference library are also noted commodities.
- Canadian Motorsport Hall of Fame – Originating to a section made within the Canadian Sports Hall of Fame, a provincially recognized museum dedicated to the dozens of motorsport events of Canada was opened in 1993, with various articles relating to auto racing are displayed. After debate regarding its permanent location, it now resides in Halton Hills, Ontario.
- Gilles Villeneuve Museum – Founded in Montreal, the birth province of past Formula One driver Gilles Villeneuve, Villeneuve's race cars, contracts, and other personal paraphernalia are displayed in this museum. From a former post office display, this entire building is dedicated to Villeneuve's life, and belongings, along with the motorsport achievements of his son, Jacques Villeneuve.
