= Jack Greedy =

Canadian racing driver (1929–1988)

Jack Greedy (1929 – 1 May 1988) was a Canadian racing driver who was inducted into the Canadian Motorsport Hall of Fame in 2004. Nicknamed "Smilin' Jack", he was the founder of the Ontario Stock Car Racing Association in 1976.
