= Ken Achs =

Canadian drag racer

Ken Achs is a Canadian drag racer. He was inducted into the Canadian Motorsport Hall of Fame in 2003 in Toronto, the Canadian Drag Racing Hall of Fame in 2016 in Montreal, the Western Canadian Motorsport Hall of Fame in Edmonton in 2022 and Saskatchewan Sports Hall of Fame in 2022. As founder and CEO of the Mid-West Group of Companies, the real estate magnate is listed in the Who's Who of Canadian business and named as a Canadian business leader in Peter Newman's book "Titans, The New Canadian Business Establishment". He is the recipient of numerous business awards throughout his career including his induction into the SABEX Business Hall of Fame and the Junior Achievement Saskatchewan Business Hall of Fame, The President's Award for his lifetime contributions to planning and development of real estate, The Raj Manek Mentorship Award, for his contributions in mentoring young entrepreneurs, and numerous awards for his re-developments of heritage properties including the nationally designated CP Railway Station located in his home town of Saskatoon, Canada. He has developed commercial and residential award-winning real estate throughout western Canada and the western USA. The Mid-West Group also has an automotive division keeping Achs true to his roots in car racing.

Achs paid tributes in Saskatoon, Canada, to Joni Mitchell , who started her career in music at a coffee shop located across the street from Achs’ first business on Broadway in Saskatoon.

The son of a Hungarian immigrant, Achs is married to lawyer, former model, and long time Canadian television personality on the Global network, Colleen Wilson, who has worked with him in the Mid-West Group since the mid 1990s.
