= Ron Farmer (motorsport) =

Canadian motorsport administrator

Ron Farmer was involved in the building of the Mission Raceway Park, a racetrack in Mission, British Columbia, Canada. He was the manager of the raceway until 1995. He was inducted into the Canadian Motorsport Hall of Fame in 1998.
