= Richard Baker (theologian) =

- Born: 1741
- Died: 1818 (aged 76–77)
- Occupation: Writer

Richard Baker, D.D. (1741–1818) was an English theological writer.

== Life ==
Baker was educated at Pembroke College, Cambridge, where he graduated B.A. (as seventh senior optime) in 1762, M.A. in 1765, and D.D. in 1788. He was elected to a fellowship in his college, and in 1772 was presented to the rectory of Cawston-with-Portland in Norfolk, which he held till his death in 1818.

== Works ==
Baker's works are:

- How the Knowledge of Salvation is attainable, a sermon on John vii. 17, 1782, 4to.
- The Harmony or Agreement of the Four Evangelists, in four parts, London, 1783–87, 8vo.
- The Psalms of David Evangelized, wherein are seen the Unity of Divine Truth, the Harmony of the Old and New Testament, and the peculiar Doctrines of Christianity, in agreement with the Experience of Believers in all Ages, London, 1811, 8vo.
