= Dick Baker (racing driver) =

Canadian racecar driver (1938–2001)

Dick Baker (1938 – August 1, 2001) was a Canadian racecar driver who was inducted into the Canadian Motorsport Hall of Fame in 2002 for his accomplishments in vintage racing. He was the founder of Can-Truck, a trucking company, and had been Chairman of the Board of the Canadian Motorsport Hall of Fame.
