= Miss Supertest III =

Canadian hydroplane

Miss Supertest III was a hydroplane designed and built by Canadians that won the 1959 Detroit Memorial Regatta and the 1959, 1960 and 1961 Harmsworth Cup races—the only four races she ever entered. She was the only three-time Harmsworth Cup winner and the first non-U.S. winner in 39 years.

Racing out of Sarnia, Ontario, Miss Supertest III was owned by J. Gordon Thompson, owner of Supertest Petroleum (later acquired by BP). The team was managed by his son, Jim Thompson, and the boat piloted by Bob Hayward. Miss Supertest III was inducted into Canada's Sports Hall of Fame. She is currently owned by Murray Walker. Her predecessor, Miss Supertest II, was briefly the fastest propeller-driven motorboat in the world, setting a water speed record of 296.96 km/h (184.494 mph) on November 1, 1957, at Picton, Ontario, with Art Asbury at the wheel. She broke a record that had stood for five years, but a new record was set only a few weeks later. The Harmsworth Cup races near Picton were broadcast on CJBQ radio by Jack Devine.

The first Miss Supertest was originally known as Miss Canada IV and competed in hydroplane races from 1949 to the mid-1950s.

The Miss Supertest boats were retired following the death of Bob Hayward. He was killed while racing Miss Supertest II about a month after winning the 1961 Harmsworth Cup with Miss Supertest III.

Canada Post issued a commemorative stamp in 2011 honouring Miss Supertest III, her driver Bob Hayward and businessman Jim Thompson, who designed and built her.
