= Canadian Motorsport Hall of Fame =

Hall of fame in Toronto

The Canadian Motorsport Hall of Fame (CMHF) is a hall of fame run by the Canadian Motorsport Heritage Foundation as a not-for-profit charitable institution that "honours and recognizes the achievements of individuals and institutions that have made outstanding contributions to Canadian motorsport as drivers, owners, team members, motorsport builders, sponsors and significant contributors, as well as those who have distinguished themselves in the new Media category." It was established in 1992 by Gary Magwood and Lee Abrahamson, with assistance by Automobile Journalists Association of Canada founding president and motorsport reporter Len Coates, to celebrate the accomplishments and contributions of the various Canadian motorsports communities. The CMHF has moved location six times over the course of its history due to difficulties garnering sponsorship and community support creating financial trouble, and has been housed at The Canadian Motorsport Heritage Museum, in Toronto's Downsview Park since 2010.

Inductees are received by a panel of motorsport experts from the CMHF Nomination Committee. Normally, all inductees have to be retired from competition for at least three years or have been active in motorsports for about a quarter of a century. The long, public nomination process allows submissions to be sent to the nomination committee of the CMHF's legal administrators, the Canadian Automotive Collection (CAC), which passes the successful nominees to its independent, expert Selection Committee. A subsequent ballot determining the submissions list by an independent scoring process system for nomination evaluation by each Selection Committee member is presented to the CAC and the CMHF for ratification following the conclusion of the public nomination procedure. The board subsequently determines a cut-off score when it opts to identify all candidates in a given year and then the inductees' names are presented to them. Each successful inductee is contacted by the chair of the board before their names are publicly released. Before that, Abrahamson and Magwood wrote to associations and senior Canadian motorsports clubs asking for nominees, with an eight or ten-person experienced journalist standing committee choosing the inductees.

There are five main types of category of which inductees are placed into: Competitors, Motorsport Builders, Team Members, Significant Contributors and the Media. The CMHF established an additional international category in 2009 to recognize "significant contributions to motorsports in Canada" and "prominent international figures". Each inductee receives a personal plaque bearing the CMHF logo and one on the mezzanine inside the CMHF for listing purposes. Articles and photographs detailing the inductees' achievements are put on display in the hall of fame and there are various displays inside it. The inaugural induction gala dinner ceremony to honour inductees took place at the Four Seasons Hotel Yorkville, in Toronto, Ontario, August 19, 1993, and since 2019 has been held annually as part of the Canadian International AutoShow in Toronto after it was staged as a late-year unincorporated ceremony for most of its history. There was no induction in 2009 as a result of the economic constraints caused by the Great Recession in North America forcing the CMHF's board of directors opting to postpone the ceremony to the following year.

Since 1993, a total of 294 individuals from the world of motorsport have been inducted, with between five and fifteen auto racing figures added each year. The vast majority are men; there have been eight women who have been elected to the CMHF. Kay Petre became the first woman racing driver to be named an inductee in 1995, and the two most recent women to be added to the CMHF were Nathalie Richard and Anne Roy in 2020. The first inducted physician was Hugh E. Scully in 2000. Hydroplane drivers Robert Theoret and Jean Theoret are the only two brothers to have been inducted individually in 2006 and 2010 respectively. The 2018 class was the first to composed wholly of print and broadcast motorsport journalists. The CMHF contains nine organizations and on seven occasions there have been two or more inductees grouped for their combined work. Of the international inductees, they include Carroll Shelby (2009), Bobby Rahal (2010), Sid Watkins (2010), Michael Andretti (2011), Mario Andretti (2012), Nigel Mansell (2013), Jackie Stewart (2014), Multimatic Motorsports (2015), Legendary Motorcar (2016), Honda (2017) and McLaren (2019).

== Inductees ==
Key
†	Indicates posthumous induction
*	Denotes international inductee

Inductees of the Canadian Motorsport Hall of Fame
Year	Inductee	Occupation	Category	Refs
1993	Bill Brack	Competitor	Road racing	
1993	John Cannon	Competitor	Road racing	
1993	Billy Foster†	Competitor	Stock car racing	
1993	Imperial Tobacco	Significant contributor	—N/a	
1993	Bob McLean†	Competitor	Road racing	
1993	Chuck Ratheb	Motorsport builder	Road racing	
1993	Peter Ryan†	Competitor	Road racing	
1993	Bill Sadler	Motorsport builder	Road racing	
1993	Gilles Villeneuve†	Competitor	Road racing	
1993	Eppie Wietzes	Competitor	Road racing	
1994	Dave Billes	Motorsport builder	Road racing	
1994	George Chapman	Competitor	Road racing	
1994	Ross de St. Croix	Competitor	Road racing	
1994	Mike Duff (Note: Duff is now known as Michelle due to gender transitioning in 1982.)	Competitor	Motorcycle racing	
1994	George Eaton	Competitor	Road racing	
1994	Bob Hanna	Motorsport builder	Road racing	
1994	Jimmy Howard	Competitor	Stock car racing	
1994	Horst Kroll	Competitor	Road racing	
1994	Norm Namerow	Competitor	Road racing	
1994	John Ross	Motorsport builder	Road racing	
1995	Dale Armstrong	Competitor	Drag racing	
1995	Francis Bradley	—N/a	Road racing	
1995	Trevor Deeley	Competitor	Motorcycle racing	
1995	Brad Francis	Motorsport builder	—N/a	
1995	Frank Hawley	Competitor	Road racing	
1995	Ted Hogan†	Competitor	Stock car racing	
1995	Norm Lelliott†	Competitor	Stock car racing	
1995	Harvey Lennox	Competitor	Stock car racing	
1995	Dean Murray	Motorsport builder	Stock car racing	
1995	Derek Oland	Competitor; Motorsport builder	Grand Prix	
1995	Kay Petre†	Competitor	Road racing	
1995	Ron and Eve White	Motorsport builder	Motorcycle racing	
1996	Warren Coniam	Competitor	Stock car racing	
1996	Doug Duncan†	Motorsport builder	Stock car racing	
1996	Bernie Fedderly	Motorsport builder	Drag racing	
1996	Craig Hill	Competitor	Road racing	
1996	Harvey Hudes†	Significant contributor	—N/a	
1996	Graham Light	Competitor	Drag racing	
1996	Molson Brewery	Significant contributor	—N/a	
1996	Ted Strugess	Competitor	Motorcycle racing	
1996	John Williams	Competitor	Motorcycle racing	
1996	Walter Wolf	Motorsport builder	Road racing	
1997	Wallie Branston	Competitor	Stock car racing	
1997	Craig Fisher	Competitor	Road racing	
1997	Jim Gunn	Motorsport builder	Rally racing	
1997	Billy Kydd	Competitor	Drag racing	
1997	Ed Leavens	Competitor	Road racing	
1997	Roger McCaig	Competitor	Road racing	
1997	The Mehlenbacher Family	Significant contributor	Drag racing	
1997	David Wildman	Competitor	Motorcycle racing	
1997	Scott Wilson	Competitor	Drag racing	
1998	Tom Burgess	Competitor	Rally racing	
1998	Sandy Elliot	Motorsport builder	Drag racing	
1998	Ron Farmer	Significant contributor	—N/a	
1998	David Greenblatt	Motorsport builder	Road racing	
1998	Tom Johnston	Competitor	Road racing	
1998	Tom Jones	Competitor	Rally racing	
1998	Jim Kelly	Competitor	Motorcycle racing	
1998	David T. Morris	Competitor	Road racing	
1998	Al Pease	Competitor	Road racing	
1998	Ross Pederson	Competitor	Motorcycle racing	
1999	Gary Beck	Competitor	Drag racing	
1999	Maurice Carter	Competitor	Road racing	
1999	Castrol North America	Significant contributor	—N/a	
1999	Yvon Duhamel	Competitor	Motorcycle racing	
1999	Grant King	Motorsport builder	Stock car racing	
1999	Ray Peets	Motorsport builder	Drag racing	
2000	Gordie Bonin	Competitor	Drag racing	
2000	Jacques Couture	Competitor	Road racing	
2000	Junior Hanley	Competitor	Stock car racing	
2000	Bob Hayward†	Competitor	Powerboat racing	
2000	Ludwig Heimrath	Competitor	Road racing	
2000	Ron Hodgson	—N/a	Drag racing	
2000	Gordon Jenner	Motorsport builder	Drag racing	
2000	Ernie McLean	Significant contributor	Stock car racing	
2000	Greg Moore†	Competitor	Road racing	
2000	Earl Ross	Competitor	Stock car racing	
2000	Hugh E. Scully	Significant contributor	—N/a	
2001	Art Asbury	Competitor	Powerboat racing	
2001	Don Biederman†	Competitor	Stock car racing	
2001	Jean-Paul Cabana	Competitor	Stock car racing	
2001	Terry Capp	Competitor	Drag racing	
2001	Eldon Rasmussen	Competitor	Stock car racing	
2001	David Sehl	Competitor	Motorcycle racing	
2001	Bill Sharpless	Competitor	Motorcycle racing	
2001	Richard Spenard	Competitor	Road racing	
2001	Jacques Villeneuve	Competitor	Snowmobile racing	
2002	Ken Achs	Competitor	Drag racing	
2002	Dick Baker	Competitor/Significant contributor	Road racing	
2002	Pete Bicknell	Competitor	Stock car racing	
2002	Jake DeRosier†	Competitor	Motorcycle racing	
2002	Scott Goodyear	Competitor	Road racing	
2002	Jim Hallahan	Competitor	Stock car racing	
2002	Guy Lombardo	Competitor	Powerboat racing	
2002	Barry Paton	Competitor	Drag racing	
2002	Bob & Leone Stack	Significant contributor	Stock car racing	
2002	Roy Smith	Competitor	Stock car racing	
2003	Walter Boyce	Competitor	Rally racing	
2003	British Empire Motor Club	Significant contributor	Motorcycle racing	
2003	Jack Canfield†	Competitor	Motorcycle racing/Road racing	
2003	John Cordts	Competitor	Road racing	
2003	Harry Greening †	Significant contributor	Powerboat racing	
2003	Taisto Heinonen	Competitor	Rally racing	
2003	Bert Straus	Competitor	Drag racing	
2004	Larry Bastedo	Competitor/Significant contributor	Motorcycle racing	
2004	Alice and Jim Fergusson†	Competitor/Significant contributor	Motorcycle racing/Rally racing/Road racing	
2004	Jack Greedy†	Competitor	Stock car racing	
2004	Bob and Helen Harvey†	Significant contributor	Drag racing	
2004	Doug Kennington	Competitor	Drag racing	
2004	George LeMay†	Competitor	Stock car racing	
2004	Rollie McDonald	Competitor	Stock car racing	
2004	Jean-Paul Perusse	Competitor	Rally racing	
2004	Gordon Reelie†	Motorsport builder	Stock car racing	
2004	Mark Rothmarel	Competitor	Powerboat racing	
2004	Brian Stewart	Motorsport builder	Road racing	
2005	Bill Adam	Competitor	Road racing	
2005	Frank Allers	Competitor	Road racing	
2005	John De Gruchy	Competitor/Significant contributor	Motorcycle racing	
2005	Pete Henderson†	Competitor	Stock car racing	
2005	Brian Robertson	Competitor/Motorsport builder	Road racing	
2005	Jack Smith†	Competitor/Motorsport builder	Stock car racing	
2005	Jim Thompson	Motorsport builder	Powerboat racing	
2005	Harold Wilson	Competitor	Powerboat racing/Rally racing/Road racing	
2006	Bob Atchison	Competitor/Motorsport builder	Drag racing	
2006	Alec Bennett†	Competitor	Motorcycle racing	
2006	John Bird	Competitor	Rally racing	
2006	Jacques Dallaire	Significant contributor	—N/a	
2006	John Duff†	Competitor	Road racing	
2006	Lorne Leibel	Competitor	Powerboat racing/Road racing	
2006	Dan Marisi†	Significant contributor	—N/a	
2006	Ted Powell	Competitor	Road racing	
2006	Lloyd Shaw†	Competitor	Stock car racing	
2006	Bruce Simpson	Competitor	Rally racing	
2006	Robert Theoret	Competitor	Powerboat racing	
2007	Jack Christie	Motorsport builder	Road racing	
2007	Scott Fraser†	Competitor	Stock car racing	
2007	Geoff Goodwin	Competitor/Motorsport builder/Significant contributor	Drag racing	
2007	Ted Gryguc	Competitor	Power boat racing	
2007	Alan Labrosse	Significant contributor	Road racing/Stock car racing	
2007	Bill Mathews†	Competitor	Motorcycle racing	
2007	Tony Novotny	Significant contributor	Stock car racing	
2009	Carl Bastedo	Competitor	Motorcycle racing	
2009	C. Alan Bunting†	Significant contributor	—N/a	
2009	Canadian Race Communications Association	Significant contributor	—N/a	
2009	Doug Fairchild†	Significant contributor	—N/a	
2009	Wayne Kelly†	Competitor/Motorsport builder	Road racing	
2009	Bill Lefeuvre	Competitor	Rally racing	
2009	Norm Mackereth	Competitor	Stock car racing	
2009	Michel Mercier	Competitor	Motorcycle racing	
2009	Jim O'Donnell	Significant contributor	Road racing	
2009	F.J. Smith	Competitor	Drag racing	
2009	Bruce Vessair	Competitor	Snowmobile racing	
2009	Gary Vessair	Competitor	Snowmobile racing	
2009	Carroll Shelby*	Significant contributor	International	
2010	Paul Cooke	Competitor/Significant contributor	—N/a	
2010	Jacques Duval	Competitor	Road racing	
2010	Bob Elliott	Competitor	Drag racing	
2010	Roger Peart	Competitor/Significant contributor	Road racing	
2010	Bobby Rahal*	Competitor/Motorsport builder	Road Racing	
2010	Herbie Rodgers	Competitor	Drag racing	
2010	Jean Theoret	Competitor	Power boat racing	
2010	Sid Watkins*	Significant contributor	International/Road racing	
2010	John Webster	Competitor/Significant contributor	Power boat racing	
2010	Norm Woods	Competitor	Power boat racing	
2011	Michael Andretti*	Competitor	Significant contributor	
2011	Rudy Bartling	Competitor	Road racing	
2011	Ben Docktor	Competitor/Significant contributor	Road racing	
2011	Robin Edwardes	Competitor/Significant contributor	Rally racing	
2011	Norm Ellefson	Competitor	Stock car racing	
2011	Dick Foley	Competitor	Stock car racing	
2011	Paul Manson	Competitor	Rally racing	
2011	Greg Sewart	Competitor	Stock car racing	
2012	Mario Andretti*	—N/a	—N/a	
2012	Bob Armstrong†	Competitor/Significant contributor	Road racing	
2012	Jimmy Carr	Motorsport builder/Significant contributor	Stock car racing	
2012	John and Sharon Fletcher	Significant contributor	Drag racing	
2012	Ron Fellows	Competitor	Road racing	
2012	Tom Walters	Competitor	Stock car racing	
2013	Diana Carter	Competitor	Road racing	
2013	John Magill	Competitor	Road racing	
2013	Nigel Mansell*	—N/a	—N/a	
2013	Scott Maxwell	Competitor	Road racing	
2013	Norris McDonald	Competitor/Journalist	Stock car racing	
2013	Paul Tracy	Competitor	Road racing	
2014	John Chisholm†	Competitor/Significant contributor	Stock car racing	
2014	Ralph Luciw	Competitor/Significant contributor	—N/a	
2014	Jackie Stewart*	—N/a	—N/a	
2014	Alex Tagliani	Competitor	—N/a	
2014	Don Thomson Jr.	Competitor/Motorsport builder	—N/a	
2015	Peter Gibbons	Competitor	Stock car racing	
2015	Antoine L'Estage	Competitor	Rally racing	
2015	Multimatic Motorsports*	—N/a	—N/a	
2015	John Edgar Petrie	Competitor	Drag racing	
2015	Jordan Szoke	Competitor	Motorcycle racing	
2015	David Whitlock	Competitor	Stock car racing	
2016	Jacques Bouchard and Ronald Denis	Significant contributor	—N/a	
2016	Terry Dale	Significant contributor	—N/a	
2016	Peter Lockhart	Significant contributor/Competitor	Road Racing	
2016	David Mathers	Significant contributor	—N/a	
2016	Lewis MacKenzie	Competitor	Drag racing	
2016	Legendary Motorcar*	—N/a	—N/a	
2016	Chris Pfaff	Significant contributor	—N/a	
2016	John Powell†	Significant contributor	—N/a	
2016	Sid Priddle	Significant contributor	—N/a	
2017	Doug Crosty	Formula Atlantic Championship winning engineer		
2017	François Dumontier	Canadian Grand Prix promoter		
2017	Honda*	—N/a	—N/a	
2017	D. J. Kennington	Double NASCAR Pinty's Series champion		
2017	Jim Robinson	Television filmmaker and producer		
2017	John Sambrook	Championship driver	Race association official	
2017	Scott Steckly	Quadruple NASCAR Pinty's Series champion		
2017	Jim Tario	Official at the Grand Prix of Toronto		
2017	Jacques Villeneuve	Formula One World Champion and Indianapolis 500 winner		
2018	Len Coates†	Canada's first motorsport reporter		
2018	Gerald Donaldson	Motorsports journalist and writer		
2018	Dave Franks	Motorsports photographer		
2018	Graham Jones	Motorsports writer and columnist		
2018	Pierre Lecours	Motorsports journalist		
2018	Dean McNulty	Motorsports journalist		
2018	Tim Miller	Motorsports reporter		
2018	Jeff Pappone	Motorsports reporter		
2018	Dan Proudfoot	First motorsport beat reporter		
2018	Erik Tomas	Raceline radio host and producer		
2019	Allen Berg	—N/a	—N/a	
2019	Robin Buck	—N/a	—N/a	
2019	Larry Caruso	—N/a	—N/a	
2019	Ed Hakonson	—N/a	—N/a	
2019	Normand Legualt	—N/a	—N/a	
2019	Gary Magwood	—N/a	—N/a	
2019	McLaren*	—N/a	—N/a	
2019	Bruno Spengler	—N/a	—N/a	
2020	Myles Brandt	Builder	—N/a	
2020	Jim Bray	Competitor	—N/a	
2020	Danny Burritt	Competitor/Team builder	—N/a	
2020	Kevin Dowler	Competitor/Builder	—N/a	
2020	Louis-Philippe Dumoulin	Competitor	—N/a	
2020	Mike Miller	Builder	—N/a	
2020	Alex Nagy	Competitor/Builder	—N/a	
2020	Lawrence Partington	Media	—N/a	
2020	Nathalie Richard	Competitor	—N/a	
2020	Anne Roy	Builder/Contributor	—N/a	
2020	Steve Robblee	Competitor	—N/a	
2020	Robert F. Seal	Builder	—N/a	
2020	Ron St. Clair	Builder/Contributor	—N/a	
2020	Kenny Wilden	Competitor	—N/a	
2020	Doug Woods	Builder/Competitor	—N/a	
2021	John Bondar	Builder	—N/a	
2021	Patrick Carpentier	Competitor	—N/a	
2021	Wally Dallenbach Sr.	Competitor/Significant Contributor	—N/a	
2021	Bertrand Godin	Competitor	—N/a	
2021	Brian Graham	Competitor/Builder/Team Member/Significant Contributor	—N/a	
2021	John Graham	Competitor/Builder	—N/a	
2021	Colin Hine	Builder/Team Member	—N/a	
2021	Kandy Mitton	Competitor/Media	—N/a	
2021	Howie Scanell	Competitor	—N/a	
2021	Glenn Styres	Competitor/Builder/Team Member/Significant Contributor	—N/a	
2021	Bill Zardo Sr.	Competitor/Builder/Team Member/Significant Contributor	—N/a	
2021	Philippe Brasseur	Media	—N/a	
2021	Clare Dear	Media	—N/a	
2021	Gerry Frechette	Media	—N/a	
2021	James Martyn†	Media	—N/a	
2021	Frank Orr†	Media	—N/a	
2021	Allan de la Plante	Media	—N/a	
2022	AIM Autosport	Competitor	—N/a	
2022	Uli Bieri	Competitor/Significant Contributor	—N/a	
2022	Chris Bye	Competitor/Significant Contributor	—N/a	
2022	Gary Elliott	Competitor	—N/a	
2022	Terry Epp	Significant Contributor	—N/a	
2022	Robert Giannou	Competitor	—N/a	
2022	Carl Harr	Competitor	—N/a	
2022	Dave Lloyd	Significant Contributor	—N/a	
2022	Derek Lynch	Competitor	—N/a	
2022	Bob MacDonald	Competitor/Team Member	—N/a	
2022	Dick Midgley	Team Builder	—N/a	
2022	Scott Spencer	Team Member/Significant Contributor	—N/a	
2022	Russ Urlin	Competitor/Special Contributor	—N/a	
2022	Bruce Biegler	Media	—N/a	
2023	Claude Aubin†	Competitor	—N/a	
2023	Jeremy Dale	Competitor	—N/a	
2023	Mark Dilley	Competitor	—N/a	
2023	James Hinchcliffe	Competitor	—N/a	
2023	Ernie Jakubowski	Competitor	—N/a	
2023	Norman Jennings	Significant Contributor	—N/a	
2023	Brad Moran	Significant Contributor	—N/a	
2023	Patrick Richard	Competitor	—N/a	
2023	Didier Schraenen	Competitor	—N/a	
2023	Dan Sprongl	Competitor/Team Builder	—N/a	
2023	Frank Sprongl	Competitor/Team Builder	—N/a	
2023	Bill Vallis	Builder	—N/a	
2023	Jordan Waldie	Competitor	—N/a	
2023	Kuno Wittmer	Competitor	—N/a	
2023	John Massingberd†	Media	—N/a	
2023	J. Wally Nesbitt	Media	—N/a	
