= Harmsworth Cup =

The Harmsworth Cup, popularly known as the Harmsworth Trophy, is a historically important British international trophy for motorboats.

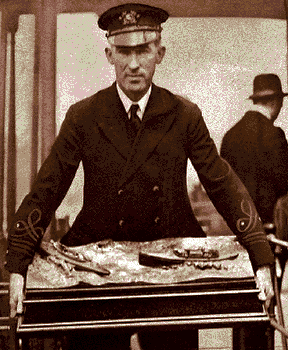
Garfield Wood holding the Harmsworth Trophy

== History ==
The Harmsworth was the first annual international award for motorboat racing. Officially, it is a contest not between boats or individuals but between nations. The boats were originally to be designed and built entirely by residents of the country represented, using materials and units built wholly within that country. The rules were somewhat relaxed in 1949 and may have been relaxed further since.

It was founded by the newspaper publisher Alfred Charles William Harmsworth (later Lord Northcliffe) in 1903.

In 1903, the course was from Cobh (Queenstown) to the marina in Cork, Ireland. It was a poorly organised affair, with many boats failing even to start due to the British organisers claiming the French boats were not completely built in France, and thus they were excluded from the race. Thus there were three entries, but the organisers insisted in running heats before the final race. Mr F Beadel was excluded from competing in the final despite putting in a better time over the 8 1/2-mile course than Thornycroft England won the trophy in 1903 with Dorothy Levitt driving a Napier-powered, 40-foot steel-hulled boat at 19.53 mph at Queenstown in Cork harbour. It was owned and entered by Selwyn Edge a director of Napier Motors. France won in 1904. In 1907, it was won by Americans for the first time. The US and England traded it back and forth until 1920. From 1920 to 1933, Americans had an unbroken winning streak. Gar Wood won this race eight times as a driver and nine times as an owner between 1920 and 1933.

Time magazine said of the 1920 race: "Many a race between shadowy contraband-carrying rumrunners and swift, searchlight playing patrol boats has been run on the narrow Detroit river. Last week 400,000 persons lined the river's edge to watch millionaires race millionaires."

The Harmsworth was reinstated in 1949 and remained in American hands until 1959. In 1959, Canadians won the award. The driver, Bob Hayward, won the Harmsworth again in 1960 and 1961. He died in another race in 1961. The Harmsworth was not run again until 1977, and continued to be run until 1986.

In 1989 it was awarded to Stefano Casiraghi, husband of Princess Caroline of Monaco.

The trophy has been awarded sporadically from 1986 through to 2018, with a total of eleven earned in that time.

== Trophy winners ==
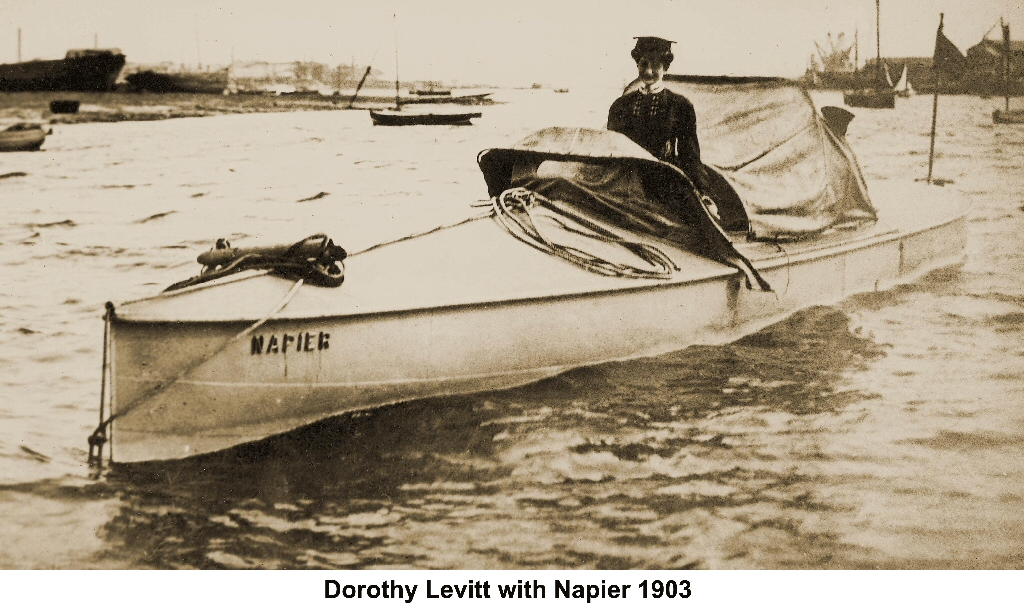
Napier motor yacht, 1903

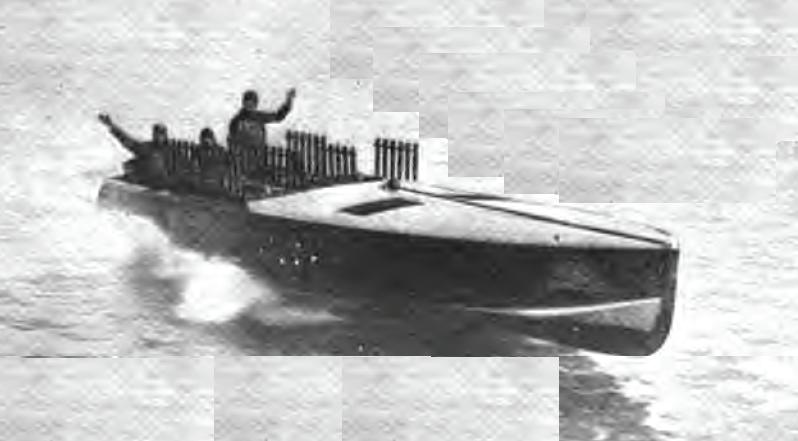
Miss America II

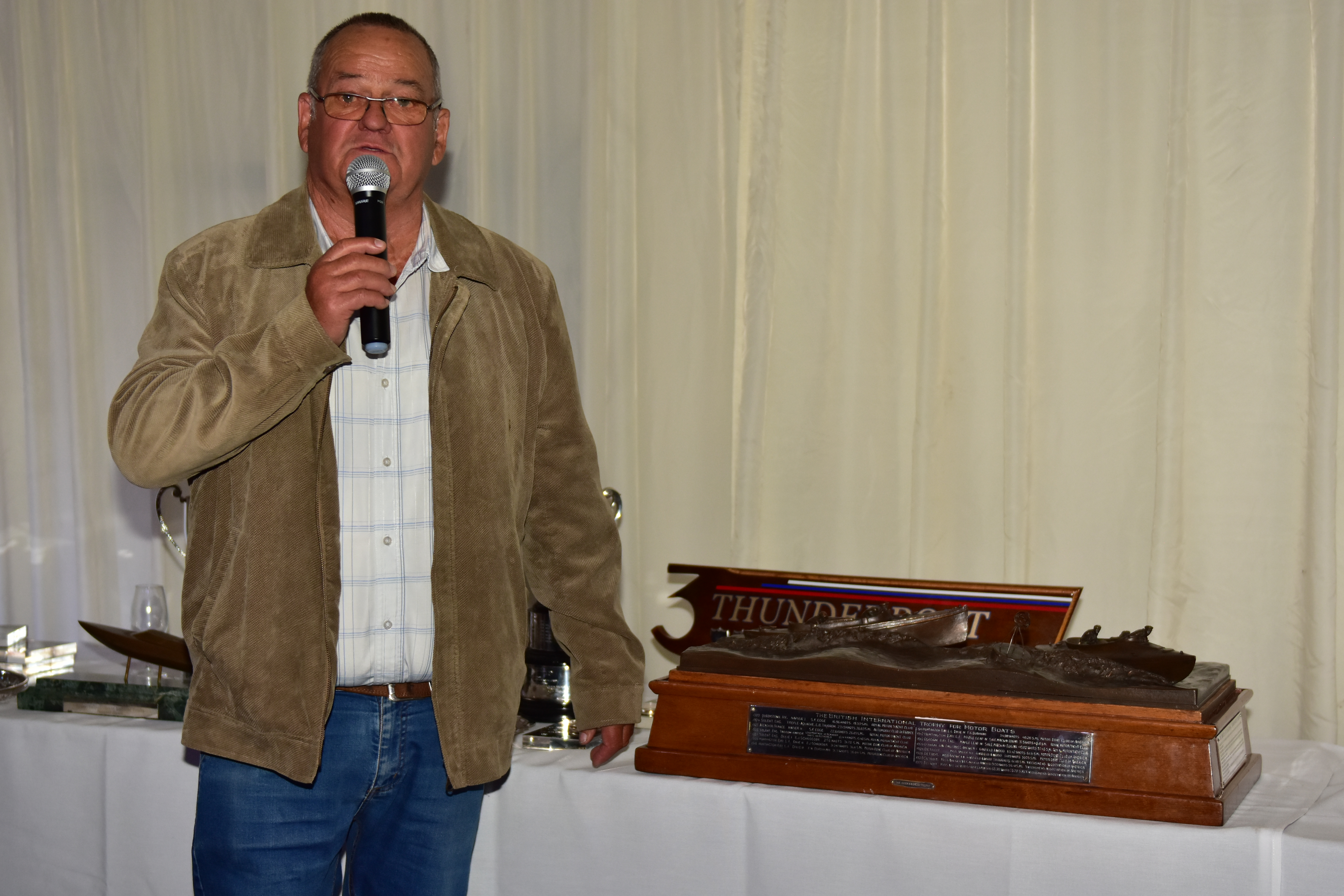
Doug Bricker

Year	Venue	Boat	Owner	Country	Driver(s)	Ave. speed (mph)
1903	Queenstown (now Cobh), Ireland	Napier I	Selwyn Edge	UK	E. Campbell Muir/Dorothy Levitt	19.53
1904	Solent, UK	Trefle-à-Quatre	Emile Thubron	France	Charles-Henri ("Hemri") Brasier	26.63
1905	Arcachon, France	Napier II	Selwyn Edge	UK	Lord Montagu	26.03
1906	Solent, UK	Yarrow-Napier	Lord Montagu	UK	Lord Montagu	15.48
1907	Solent, UK	Dixie I	Edward J. Schroeder	US	Barkley Pearce	31.78
1908	Huntington Bay, United States	Dixie II	Edward J. Schroeder	United States	Barkley Pearce	31.35
1910	Huntington Bay, US	Dixie III	Frederick K. Burnham	US	Frederick K. Burnham	36.04
1911	Huntington Bay, US	Dixie IV	Frederick K. Burnham	US	Frederick K. Burnham	40.28
1912	Huntington Bay, US	Maple Leaf IV	Sir E. Mackay Edgar	UK	Thomas Sopwith Sr	43.18
1913	Osborne Bay, UK	Maple Leaf IV	Sir E. Mackay Edgar	UK	Thomas Sopwith Sr	57.45
1920	Osborne Bay, UK	Miss America I	Garfield Wood	US	Garfield Wood	61.51
1921	Detroit, US	Miss America II	Garfield Wood	US	Garfield Wood	59.75
1926	Detroit, US	Miss America V	Garfield Wood	US	Garfield Wood	61.12
1928	Detroit, US	Miss America VII	Garfield Wood	US	Garfield Wood	59.33
1929	Detroit, US	Miss America VIII	Garfield Wood	US	Garfield Wood	75.29
1930	Detroit, US	Miss America IX	Garfield Wood	US	Garfield Wood	77.23
1931	Detroit, US	Miss America VIII	Garfield Wood	US	George Wood	85.86
1932	Detroit, US	Miss America X	Garfield Wood	US	Garfield Wood	78.49
1933	Detroit, US	Miss America X	Garfield Wood	US	Garfield Wood	86.94
1949	Detroit, US	Skip-a-long		US	Stan Dollar	94.1
1950	Detroit, US	Slo-Mo-Shun IV		US	Lou Fageol	100.6
1956	Detroit, US	Shanty I		US	Russ Schleeh	90.2
1959	Detroit, US	Miss Supertest III	J. Gordon Thompson	Canada	Bob Hayward	104.0
1960	Picton, Canada	Miss Supertest III	J. Gordon Thompson	Canada	Bob Hayward	116.3
1961	Picton, Canada	Miss Supertest III	J. Gordon Thompson	Canada	Bob Hayward	100.2
1977		Limit Up		UK	Michael Doxford	
1978		Taurus		Australia	Doug Bricker	
1979		Uno Mint		UK	Derek Pobjoy	
1980		Long Shot		US	Bill Elswick	
1981	Dania, FL	Satisfaction		US	Paul Clauser & Errol Lanier	78.6
1982		Popeyes		US	Al Copeland	
1983		Fayva Shoes		US	George Morales	
1984	UK/Bahamas			UK	Hill, Jones & Wilson	
1985	UK/Bahamas			UK	Hill, Jones, Wilson & Williams	
1986	St. Louis, US/UK			US	Seebold/ Seebold, Thornton	
1989	Atlantic City, US	Gancia Dei Gancia		Monaco	Stefano Casiraghi	
1993	Cowes, UK	La Nueva		Argentina	Daniel Scioli	91.6
1994	Cowes, UK	BP Marine		Norway	Andreas Ugland	51.3
1995	Cowes, UK	Admiral Casino Tivoli		Austria	Hannes Bohinc	86.56
2002	Cowes, UK	Super Classic 40		Italy	Buonomo/De Simone	52.40
2003	Cowes, UK	Wettpunkt.com		Austria	Hannes Bohinc	78.00
2004	Cowes, UK	Grand Argentina Sony		Italy	Fabio Buzzi/Lord Beaverbrook	75.93
2010	Cowes, UK	Red FPT		Italy	Fabio Buzzi	59.58
2011	Cowes, UK	Cinzano		Germany	Markus Hendricks	65.26

== See also ==
- Henry Segrave
- Hubert Scott-Paine
- Betty Carstairs
