= Jack Christie (racing driver) =

Jack Christie is a former Formula car racer and manager and adviser to drivers including Paul Tracy, Scott Goodyear, and Ron Fellows. He founded the Canadian Formula 2000 series in 1981 and the Rothmans Porsche Challenge in 1986. Canadian F2000 became the basis of all other F2000 series and Rothmans Porsche Challenge became the basis for the incredibly successful Porsche Supercup series around the world, although the Canadian series only lasted five years. He was inducted into the Canadian Motorsport Hall of Fame in 2008.
