= ASN Canada FIA =

- Abbreviation: ASN
- Formation: 1990
- Dissolved: 2019
- Type: Sports federation
- Purpose: Motorsports
- Location: Oakville, Ontario
- Region served: Canada
- Members: 5
- Official language: English
- President: Paul Cooke
- Affiliations: FIA; CACC; WCMA; CASC-OR; ASQ; ARMS; CARS
- Website: http://www.asncanada.com

ASN Canada FIA was founded in 1990, after Canada's original National Sporting Authority, Canadian Automobile Sport Clubs (CASC), was expelled from the FIA. In a then-unprecedented motion, the country's sporting authority was entrusted completely to a single person, Benoit Mailloux.

The expulsion ensued after legal battles between the nation's top breweries over sponsorship rights to the Formula One Canadian Grand Prix. The 1987 Canadian Grand Prix was cancelled as part of this dispute, which stemmed from FOCA's demands for increased fees for Formula One teams.

Circumstances surrounding the process were detailed in Terry Lovell's 1999 biography of Bernie Ecclestone, Bernie's Game: Inside the Formula One World of Bernie Ecclestone (ISBN 1-84358-086-1); and in CASC historian David A. Charters' book, The Chequered Past: Sports Car Racing and Rallying in Canada 1951-1991 (ISBN 0-80209-093-1).

ASN Canada FIA's national-level motorsport championships featured the National Karting Championship, Porsche GT3 Cup Challenge Canada, Canadian Touring Car Championship, Canadian AutoSlalom Championship and the Canadian Rally Championship.

In December 2019, ASN Canada FIA resigned as the Canadian national sporting authority in Canada.

In April 2020 the FIA (Fédération Internationale de l’Automobile) announced the appointment of GDS (Groupe de Développement Sportif) as the new National Sporting Authority in Canada.

== Regional Territories ==
ASN Canada FIA has appointed five territories to administer amateur motor sport in Canada:

- Canadian Association of Car Clubs (CACC) – British Columbia
- Western Canada Motorsport Association (WCMA) – Western Canada
- Canadian Automobile Sport Clubs Ontario Region (CASC-OR) – Ontario
- Auto Sport Quebec (ASQ) – Quebec
- Atlantic Region Motor Sports Inc. (ARMS) – Atlantic Canada
