= Larry Bastedo =

Canadian motorcycle racer

Lawrence (Larry) Bastedo is a Canadian motorcycle racer who was inducted into the Canadian Motorsport Hall of Fame in 2004.

Bastedo has competed in almost every discipline in motorcycling. His first major win came in 1957 winning the 500 Expert class at the CMA Ontario Championship Spring Scrambles (now known as Motocross), the Eastern Canadian Championships held at Copetown, ON and the 500 Expert class National Ice Racing Championship at St-Agathe, QC.

A road racing injury led Bastedo to Enduros and he was a member and later Manager and Official with Team Canada at the FIM World Championship for Enduro National Teams (ISDE).

As a rider, Bastedo was a member of the first Canadian Team to participate in the ISDE –

Poland 1967, a centennial project. He acted as Team Manager for a few years and after obtaining his FIM Sporting Steward's licence represented the team as the Canadian delegate on the International Jury.

For many years, Bastedo enjoyed a reputation as an outstanding race announcer.

Bastedo served on the Provincial and National Boards of the Canadian Motorcycle Association holding various positions – President, Vice President and Director, and also was accredited with National Referee status, officiating at CMA events for many years.

== Milestones ==
- 1957 500 cc Expert National Ice Racing Champion
- 1970 300 cc Expert National Enduro Champion
- 1987 Super Veteran National Enduro Champion
- 1988 Super Veteran National Enduro Champion
- 1980 CMA Ambassadors Award
- 1981 CMA Award of Merit
- 1985 CMA Fulvio Callimaci Supporters Award
- 2004 Inducted into the Canadian Motorsports Hall of Fame
- 2011 Inducted into the Canadian Motorcycle Hall of Fame
- 2014 Elected to the Hamilton Sports Hall of Fame
