= Two Ton Baker =

American singer

Dick "Two Ton" Baker
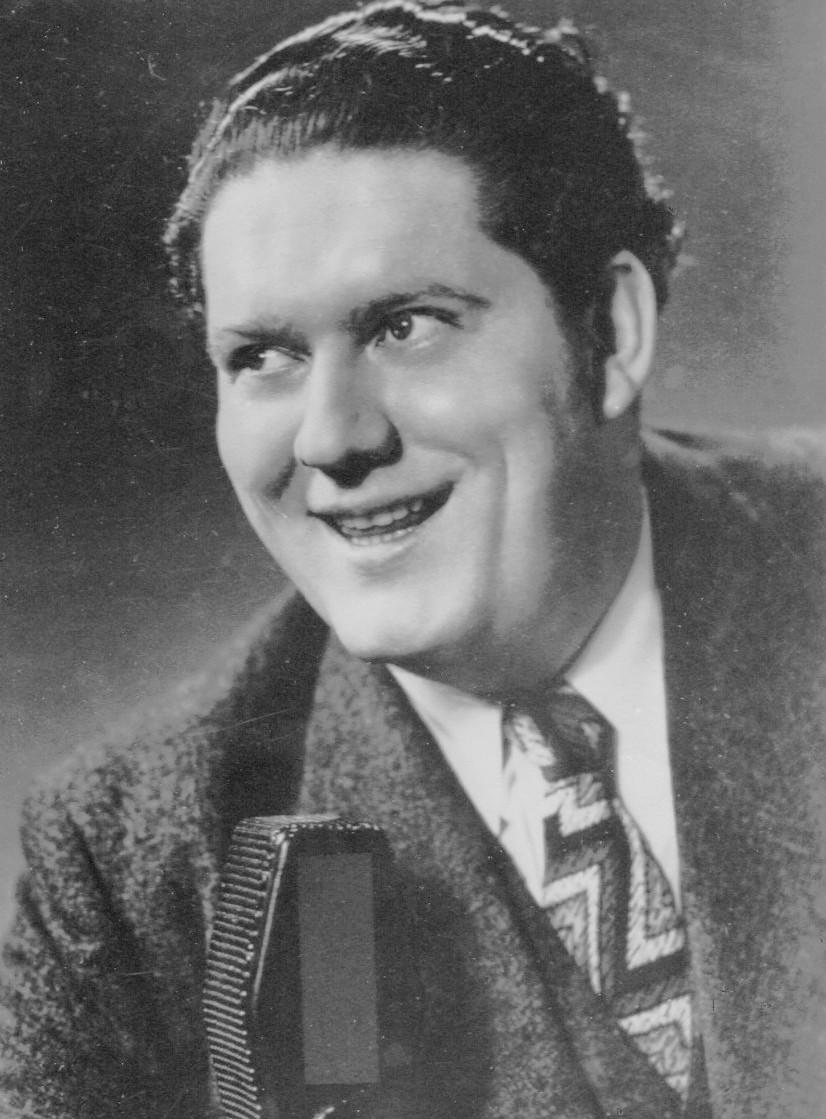
- Two Ton Baker publicity photo, 1949
- Born: Richard Baker; May 2, 1916; Chicago, Illinois
- Died: May 4, 1975 (aged 59); Hazel Crest, Illinois
- Occupations: Singer; pianist; entertainer
- Years active: 1938–1973
- Website: twotonbaker.com

Richard Evans "Two Ton" Baker (May 2, 1916 – May 4, 1975) was an American singer and entertainer who was a prominent Chicago radio and television personality for three decades; the 1940s to the 1960s. He gained some national exposure in the United States through his recordings for Mercury Records and his Mutual Broadcasting System radio show.

== Biography ==
Richard Evans Baker was born in Chicago on May 2, 1916.^{[a]} He began playing piano at two-and-a-half years of age By age four he was playing piano for his mother at musical engagements. He attended high school at Morton and Fenger in Chicago, where he was known to cut classes for musical opportunities. He joined a local 12-piece band, and had occasional gigs as a pianist, master of ceremonies, and singer. He met his wife when he was 20 years old, and married her shortly afterwards.

Baker's full-time professional entertaining career began in 1938, playing for night clubs with notable dates at the Chicago Theatre and the Riverside in Milwaukee. In 1939 he began a job as a disc jockey at radio station WJJD with a two-hour show entitled Sunday Morning Party, while also performing at the 1111 Club. It was early in his radio career that he was given the entertainment name "Two Ton" by a fellow radio-station employee. He quit WJJD in 1943 and concentrated on his nightclub work, but he was given his own radio show, One Man Show, on station WGN in 1944. For the next several years Baker was closely associated with that station, and vice versa. Baker could not pass a physical to enter the armed forces during World War II, but as he gained fame he began entertaining troops at Soldier Field. He was particularly active at Gardiner General Hospital, where he spent more than 200 hours with the wounded. Baker began recording for Mercury Records in 1946. Mercury Records and had a double-sided hit in 1947 when "Near You" reached #12, and "I'm a Lonely Little Petunia (In An Onion Patch)" peaked at #21. In total Baker had twenty-five recording sessions with Mercury between 1946 and 1951.

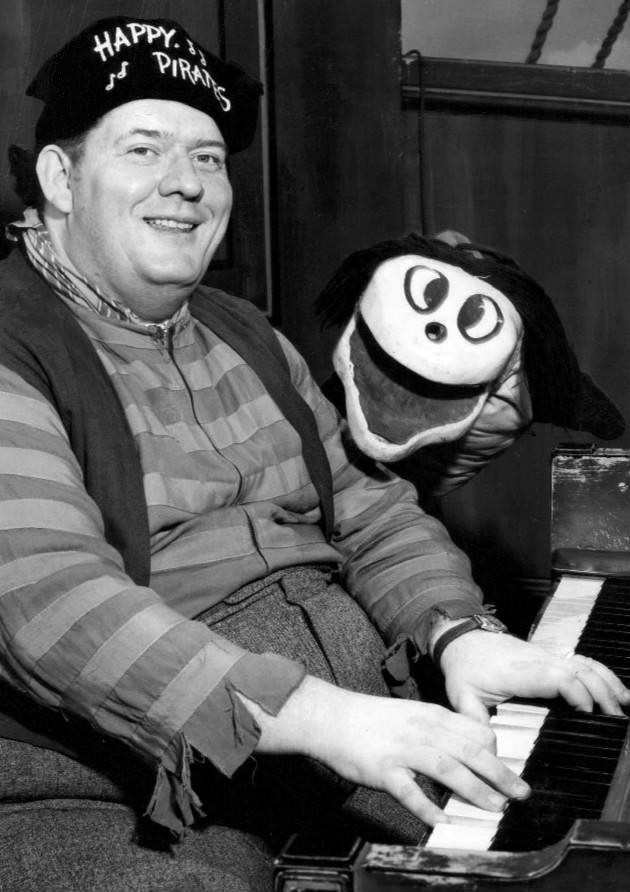
"Two Ton" Baker performing with Bubbles the porpoise from the Chicago children's television show The Happy Pirates

Baker was part of WGN-TV's grand opening show on April 5, 1948. The next day was WGN's first full day of programming which included Baker's show Wonder House, a puppet program hosted in conjunction with Art Nelson. Wonder House was aired five days a week at 7:30PM. The program featured a marionette made to look like Baker, named "Half-Ton". The show was one of the most popular early television shows in Chicago, and it was stated that Baker was "made for TV". The show was praised for Baker's performances and a well-placed set, but it suffered from poor script writing and microphone placement. Although drawing an adult audience as well as the children it was aimed at, Wonder House was cancelled after five months because of the excessive production costs. Baker gained national radio exposure when The Two Ton Baker Show, originating from WGN, was carried across the Mutual network. Baker was featured on cover of Billboard magazine in February 1949, noting his release "Roll the Patrol Closer to the Curb". That year he was appearing in fifteen 15-minute radio shows each week. Baker left Mercury, and signed to Coral Records in 1952.

From 1952 to 1956 he was host of a children's television show for WBKB entitled The Happy Pirates. Pirates featured Baker's entertainment, "Squawky the Parrot",^{[b]} and old theatrical cartoons. From 1957 to 1962 he was the spokesperson for Riverview Amusement Park. Television commercials for Riverview had Two Ton riding one of the Park Rides and him saying, "Laugh your troubles away at Riverview!" These commercials lasted until the Park closed. After that he managed to get a part in Mickey One starring Warren Beatty, which was Baker's only movie role. In 1964 he hosted Corral 26 on WCIU-TV, a Western movie presentation featuring Baker's introductions, guest interviews, singing, and promoting chocolate milk made from Bosco Chocolate Syrup. This show ended in 1966.

Later in life he returned to entertaining at Chicago night clubs. He was a mainstay at the Ivanhoe from 1965 until 1970. In 1972 Baker was selected by Duke Ellington to play piano at a symposium honoring Ellington and the history of jazz, as Ellington no longer felt he could play effectively. His recordings on Heartbeat were released as late as 1973. Baker's final employment was at Mangam's Chateau where he was engaged for five nights each week.

Baker collapsed at his Hazel Crest, Illinois home on May 4, 1975. He was taken to Ingalls Memorial Hospital and was pronounced dead upon arrival.

== Style and legacy ==
The only thing I've ever wanted to do in this world is play piano and sing on the radio. This isn't work, it's play – and I'm getting paid for it!

— Two Ton Baker

Having never received formal music training, Baker could not read music well but instead played by ear. He considered his biggest influence to be Duke Ellington. He was well-regarded for his improvisational ability. Baker was a very large man, and his outgoing personality fit his size. Billboard reviewed one of his radio shows as "zany" but humorless. However, they stated that the only reason to listen to Baker's Spotlight was Baker's piano playing and singing. Regarding his recordings, Billboard on more than one occasion noted his infectious ebullience while performing less-than-serious material.

Baker held the top two spots for in the children's category in Billboard's 1948 poll of disk-jockey's favorite records. Baker loved performing for children. In addition to his kiddie records, and children's television shows, he made numerous personal appearances at orphanages, beginning in 1945. For several years he played both piano and Santa Claus at The Blue Note (Chicago). Although known for his children's and novelty work, he also shared billing with Count Basie, Dave Brubeck, Gene Krupa, and George Shearing in a non-Christmas concert at the Blue Note.

Baker was called most commonly "Two Ton Baker, the Music Maker". Other monikers included "The One Man Show" and "Behemoth of the Keyboards".

== Recordings ==
Baker's first commercial record was a collaboration with the Hoosier Hot Shots on Decca Records. In 1946 Baker began recording for Mercury Records. The bulk of this work was novelty or children's material., but it also included "straight" material and some instrumentals. In addition to his hits, some of his better-known songs include "I Like Stinky Cheese", and "The Soup Song". At Mercury he was paired with bandleader Tiny Hill ("I'm a Bigger Man than You") and, in his last recording for Mercury, Jerry Murad's Harmonicats. He made no further recordings for Mercury after 1951. When he switched to Coral Records in 1952 he continued issuing novelty recordings aimed at the pop market. His next recordings were for Seymour Schwartz, a Chicago record store owner whose Heartbeat label was primarily for the juke box trade. He recorded for Heartbeat and successor Sunny until late in his life. The late material was more pop-oriented, although some of Baker's novelty recordings were re-recorded.

== Personal life ==
Baker and his wife, Ruth Fisher, had one son and one daughter.

== Notes ==
Two Ton Baker's biographer, also named Dick Baker, is no relation. "Squawky"'s back-story was that the bird had an absolutely filthy vocabulary acquired from time spent on a Danish vessel. However, the parrot swore only in Danish, so nobody minded.
