= Canadian Automobile Sport Clubs =

Governing body for auto racing in Canada

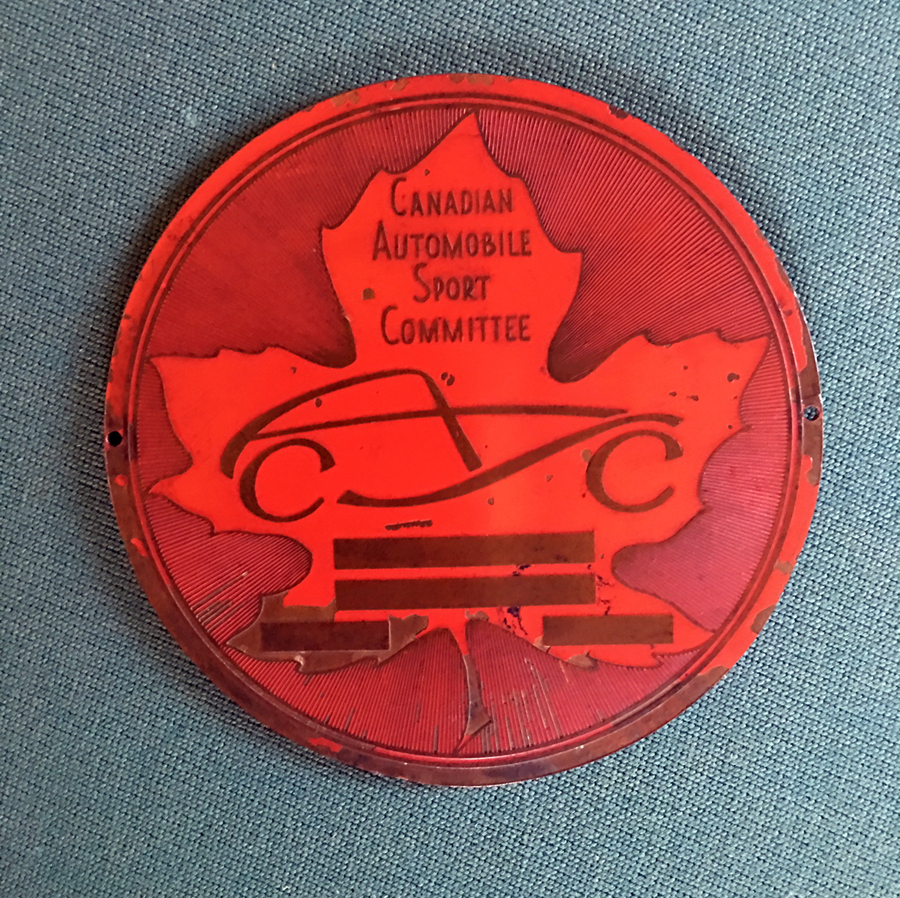
- Logo designed by Jack Luck in 1951 for Marshall Green
- Sport: Auto racing
- Jurisdiction: National
- Abbreviation: CASC
- Founded: 1958
- Affiliation: Royal Automobile Club
- Replaced: Canadian Auto Sport Committee
- (founded): 1951
- Closure date: 1988
- (Canada)

Canadian Automobile Sport Clubs (CASC) was the national governing body for auto racing in Canada from 1958 to 1988.

Its origins stretched back to 1951, when three independent car clubs met in Kingston, Ontario to found the Canadian Auto Sport Committee (CASC). In 1951, inventor, engineer and MG race driver Marshall Smith Green came from Montreal to meet in Kingston with designer Jack Luck. Green asked Luck to design the Club's logo.

The name was changed to the Canadian Automobile Sport Clubs (CASC) in 1958, when Regions across the country were developed. To get permits for International Races, CASC was affiliated with the Royal Automobile Club (RAC plc) of Great Britain until 1967, when it was recognized as a full member by the FIA as Canada's governing body of auto racing. The nation's motoring interests, meanwhile were represented to the FIA by the CASC's roadgoing counterpart, the CAA.

During its lifetime, CASC developed strong national series', such as the Canada Class; the original Honda Michelin series, the Players/GM Motorsport Series, and the Rothmans Porsche Cup series'. It also worked closely with its US counterpart, the SCCA, to develop and co-sanction the Can-Am, and Formula Atlantic series'.

As Canada's national governing body, CASC sanctioned such major events as the Player's 200 sports car races, the Shell 4000 rally, the 24 Hours of Mosport, and the Canadian Grand Prix, which alternated between Mosport and Circuit Mont-Tremblant.

The organization's demise came as a result of a boycott by Bernie Ecclestone's FOCA of the Canadian Grand Prix in 1987, as detailed in Terry Lovell's Ecclestone biography, Bernie's Game. CASC's FIA accreditation was revoked at the international body's next General Assembly, and its powers were instilled upon a single associate of Ecclestone's, Benoit Mailloux, the president of the Federation de l’Automobile Quebec, until handed over to a new body, ASN Canada FIA, in 1990. Many of CASC's records were handed over to its Ontario Region, which re-affiliated as a territory to the new ASN, while other CASC regions were disbanded and replaced by re-formed territorial organizations.

Details of the CASC history can be found in the book The Chequered Past: Sports Car Racing & Rallying in Canada 1951 - 1991 by David A Charters. CASC history can be found at the archives of the Canadian Motorsport Hall of Fame.

== See also ==
- Canadian Association for Stock Car Auto Racing (CASCAR)
- Automobile Racing Club of America (U.S.A.)
- Sports Car Club of America (U.S.A.)
- United States Auto Club (U.S.A.)
