= Joe Plazek =

Canadian racing driver (born 1961)

- Born: January 25, 1961 (age 65) Caistor Centre, Ontario, Canada
- Retired: 2002
- Debut season: 1973

Modified racing
- Years active: 1982-2000
- Car number: 1
- Championships: 4
- Wins: 80

Previous series
- 1980-1982 1977-1979 1973-1976: Late model Sport compact Motocross

Championship titles
- 1995, 1996, 1997 New York State Fair Champion

Awards
- 2002 CASCAR Rookie of the Year

NASCAR Canada Series career
- 12 races run over 1 year
- Car no., team: No. 0, Playstation 2
- Best finish: 5th (2002 Race City Motorsport Park)
- First race: 2002 MOPAR Parts 250
- Last race: 2002 Great Canadian 300
| Wins | Top tens | Poles |
|---|---|---|
| 0 | 4 | 0 |

Joe Plazek (born January 25, 1961) is a retired Canadian stock car racing driver. He was a three-time New York State Fair Champion and also won Rookie of the Year honors while competing in the Canadian premier touring stock car series.

== Racing career ==
Plazek started his racing career in 1973 motocross racing for the Canadian Motorcycle Association, then in 1977 started racing an asphalt compact car at Cayuga and Flamboro Speedways in Ontario. Within a few years, he started racing a Sportsman on clay ovals and then moved to a modified in 1983.

Plazek competed successfully on both sides of the Niagara Frontier sharing his 1996 track title at Ransomville Speedway, New York, in a tie with Danny Johnson. In Central New York he captured the 1995 track championship at Cayuga County Fair Speedway (Weedsport) along with back-to-back track championships in 1996 and 1997 at Canandaigua Speedway.

Plazek was inducted into the New York State Stock Car Association Hall of Fame in 2024, into the Land of Legends Wall of Fame in 2023, into the FOAR SCORE Hall of Fame in 2012, and into the Northeast Dirt Modified Hall of Fame in 2009.

== CASCAR ==
=== Castrol Super Series ===
Castrol Super Series results
| Year | Team | No. | Make | 1 | 2 | 3 | 4 | 5 | 6 | 7 | 8 | 9 | 10 | 11 | 12 | Rank | Points | Ref |
|---|---|---|---|---|---|---|---|---|---|---|---|---|---|---|---|---|---|---|
| 2002 | PlayStation 2 | 0 | Chevy | DEL; 21 | PET; 16 | ASE; 14 | MSP; 10 | MOS; 7 | HAM; 43 | TOR; 36 | RCS; 5 | PAC; 21 | MN; 10 | KWA; 25 | DEL; 30 | 18th | 1614 | |
