= Donald Theetge =

Canadian racing driver (born 1966)

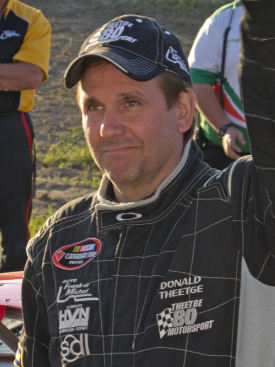
- Theetge at Autodrome Chaudière in 2012
- Born: October 3, 1966 (age 60); Quebec, Canada

NASCAR O'Reilly Auto Parts Series career
- 6 races run over 3 years
- 2020 position: 66th
- Best finish: 66th (2020)
- First race: 2018 Lakes Region 200 (Loudon)
- Last race: 2020 Desert Diamond Casino West Valley 200 (Phoenix)
Wins	Top tens	Poles
0	0	0

NASCAR Canada Series career
- 90 races run over 12 years
- 2026 position: 10th
- Best finish: 5th (2020)
- First race: 2011 GP3R 100 (Trois-Rivières)
- Last race: 2026 NTN BCA 200 (Delaware)
- First win: 2018 Velocity Prairie Thunder Twin 125s Race 1 (Saskatoon)
- Last win: 2026 NTN BCA 200 (Delaware)
Wins	Top tens	Poles
4	62	9

ARCA Menards Series East career
- 3 races run over 1 year
- Best finish: 18th (2022)
- First race: 2022 Race to Stop Suicide 200 (New Smyrna)
- Last race: 2022 Music City 200 (Nashville Fairgrounds)
Wins	Top tens	Poles
0	3	0

ARCA Menards Series West career
- 1 race run over 1 year
- First race: 2026 Kyle Busch Classic (LVMS Bullring)
Wins	Top tens	Poles
0	0	0
- Statistics up to date as of October 2, 2026.

Donald Theetge (born October 3, 1966) is a Canadian professional stock car racing driver. He last competed part-time in the NASCAR Canada Series, driving the Nos. 73/80 Chevrolet for his own team, Theetge Motorsports, and part-time in the ARCA Menards Series West, driving the No. 70 Toyota for Nitro Motorsports. He has previously competed in the NASCAR Xfinity Series and the ARCA Menards Series East.

== Racing career ==
=== Xfinity Series ===
In July 2018, Theetge made his NASCAR Xfinity Series debut at New Hampshire. He finished 33rd, driving the No. 90 for fellow Canadian Mario Gosselin's DGM Racing team. He returned to make another start for them in the race at ISM Raceway (Phoenix) in November, scoring a 25th-place finish. In 2019, Theetge would again run two races that year for DGM, which came at Las Vegas in the No. 90 and Richmond in the No. 36. In 2020, Theetge would return to the team and the Xfinity Series for the third straight year, although not until the very end of the season. He was announced to be running the final two races of the year, Martinsville and Phoenix, in the No. 90.

=== Other racing ===
Theetge competes in the NASCAR Canada Series, where he has won four times and has scored over sixty top-ten finishes.

Theetge won the Série IMAX LMS Québec in 2004, followed by the Série nationale Castrol LMS Québec in 2006 and Quebec's ACT Series in 2009. He won 19 races in the ACT Series and Série nationale Castrol LMS Québec. Theetge also won two races in the US-based ACT Tour Series, both at Circuit Riverside Speedway Ste-Croix in 2006 and 2007.

Theetge also made some road racing starts with his brother Benoit, including in the Grand-Am Continental Tire Sports Car Challenge, where they finished third at the Daytona International Speedway in 2010.

== Motorsports career results ==
=== NASCAR ===
(key) (Bold – Pole position awarded by qualifying time. Italics – Pole position earned by points standings or practice time. * – Most laps led.)

==== Xfinity Series ====
NASCAR Xfinity Series results
Year	Team	No.	Make	1	2	3	4	5	6	7	8	9	10	11	12	13	14	15	16	17	18	19	20	21	22	23	24	25	26	27	28	29	30	31	32	33	NXSC	Pts	Ref
2018	DGM Racing	90	Chevy	DAY	ATL	LVS	PHO	CAL	TEX	BRI	RCH	TAL	DOV	CLT	POC	MCH	IOW	CHI	DAY	KEN	NHA; 33	IOW	GLN	MOH	BRI	ROA	DAR	IND	LVS	RCH	CLT	DOV	KAN	TEX	PHO; 25	HOM	67th	16	
2019	DGM Racing	90	Chevy	DAY	ATL	LVS; 37	PHO	CAL	TEX	BRI																											72nd	13	
2019	DGM Racing	36	Chevy								RCH; 25	TAL	DOV	CLT	POC	MCH	IOW	CHI	DAY	KEN	NHA	IOW	GLN	MOH	BRI	ROA	DAR	IND	LVS	RCH	CLT	DOV	KAN	TEX	PHO	HOM	72nd	13	
2020	DGM Racing	90	Chevy	DAY	LVS	CAL	PHO	DAR	CLT	BRI	ATL	HOM	HOM	TAL	POC	IND	KEN	KEN	TEX	KAN	ROA	DAY	DOV	DOV	DAY	DAR	RCH	RCH	BRI	LVS	TAL	CLT	KAN	TEX	MAR; 31	PHO; 36	66th	7	

==== Canada Series ====
NASCAR Canada Series results
Year	Team	No.	Make	1	2	3	4	5	6	7	8	9	10	11	12	13	14	NCSC	Pts	Ref
2011	Donald Theetge	80	Chevy	MSP	ICAR	DEL	MSP	TOR	MPS	SAS	CTR; 33	CGV; 17	BAR	RIS	KWA			45th	176	
2016	22 Racing	22	Dodge	MSP	SSS	ACD; 4	ICAR	TOR	EIR	SAS	CTR	RIS	MSP	ASE	**KWA**; 13			32nd	72	
2017	22 Racing	22	Dodge	MSP	DEL; 18	**ACD**; 5	ICAR	TOR	SAS; 4	SAS; 6	EIR; 2	CTR	RIS; 10	MSP	ASE; 2	JUK; 2*		11th	308	
2018	22 Racing	24	Chevy	MSP; 13	JUK; 16	ACD; 3	TOR; 9	SAS; 1*	SAS; 4	EIR; 15	CTR; 7	RIS; 7	MSP; 10	ASE; 5	NHA; 3	JUK; 2		7th	483	
2019	22 Racing	24	Chevy	MSP; 13	JUK; 10	ACD; 10	TOR; 11	SAS; 7	SAS; 7	EIR; 5	CTR; 10	RIS; 13	MSP; 12	ASE; 5	NHA; 20	JUK; 3		6th	447	
2020	Wight Motorsports Inc.	80	Chevy	SUN; 6	SUN; 5	FLA; 8	FLA; 12	JUK; 8	JUK; 2									5th	225	
2021	Wight Motorsports Inc.	80	Chevy	SUN	SUN	CTR	ICAR	MSP	MSP	FLA; 10	DEL; 13	DEL; 9	DEL; 11					20th	133	
2022	Group Theetge	80	Chevy	SUN; Wth	MSP	ACD; 21	AVE; 21	TOR; Wth	EDM; 5	SAS; 22	**SAS**; 10	CTR	OSK	ICAR	MSP	DEL; 2		21st	184	
2023	Group Theetge	80	Chevy	SUN; 5	MSP	ACD; 19	AVE; 20	TOR	EIR; 6	SAS; 2	SAS; 11	CTR; 20	OSK	OSK	ICAR	MSP	DEL; 2	15th	269	
2024	Group Theetge	80	Chevy	MSP	ACD; 5	AVE; 4	RIS; 12	RIS; 12	OSK; 10	SAS; 7	EIR; 4				DEL; 15	AMS; 5		9th	358	
2024	Group Theetge	73	Chevy									CTR; 8	ICAR	MSP				9th	358	
2025	Group Theetge	80	Chevy	MSP	RIS; 14	**EDM**; 2*	SAS; 9	CMP	**ACD**; 2*				DEL; 1	**DEL**; 1*	AMS; 4			7th	305	
2025	Group Theetge	73	Chevy							CTR; 28	ICAR	MSP						7th	305	
2026	Theetge Motorsports	80	Chevy	MSP	ACD; 2	ACD; 2	RIS; 2	AMS; 5	AMS; 5	CMP	EIR; 4	EIR; 2					DEL; 1*	10th	408	
2026	Theetge Motorsports	73	Chevy										CTR; 7	MAR; 11	ICAR	MSP		10th	408	

=== ARCA Menards Series East ===
(key) (Bold – Pole position awarded by qualifying time. Italics – Pole position earned by points standings or practice time. * – Most laps led. ** – All laps led.)

ARCA Menards Series East results
Year	Team	No.	Make	1	2	3	4	5	6	7	AMSEC	Pts	Ref
2022	Visconti Motorsports	74	Toyota	NSM; 5	FIF; 9	DOV	NSV; 8	IOW	MLW	BRI	18th	110	

==== ARCA Menards Series West ====
ARCA Menards Series West results
Year	Team	No.	Make	1	2	3	4	5	6	7	8	9	10	11	12	13	AMSWC	Pts	Ref
2026	Nitro Motorsports	70	Toyota	KER	PHO	TUC	SHA	CNS	TRI	SON	PIR	AAS	MAD	LVS; 13	PHO	KER	64th	31	

=== CASCAR ===
(key) (Bold – Pole position awarded by qualifying time. Italics – Pole position earned by points standings or practice time. * – Most laps led.)

==== CASCAR Super Series ====
CASCAR Super Series results
Year	Car owner	No.	Make	1	2	3	4	5	6	7	8	9	10	11	12	CSSC	Pts	Ref
2001	Donald Theetge	80	Chevy	DEL; 15	PET; 18	MSP; 23	MSP; 19	KWA; 26	TOR; 8	ASE; 20	CTR; 17	HAM	CAL	VAN	DEL; 38	21st	1116	
2002	Donald Theetge	80	Chevy	DEL	PET	ASE	MSP	MSP	HAM	TOR	CAL	VAN	MNT; 22	KWA	DEL	65th	108	
2003	Donald Theetge	80	Chevy	DEL	PET	MSP; 19	HAM	TOR; 4	CAL	VAN	ASE	MSP	DEL	PET	HAM	23rd	650	

^{*} Season still in progress
^{1} Ineligible for series points
