= Cole Pearn =

NASCAR crew chief (born 1982)

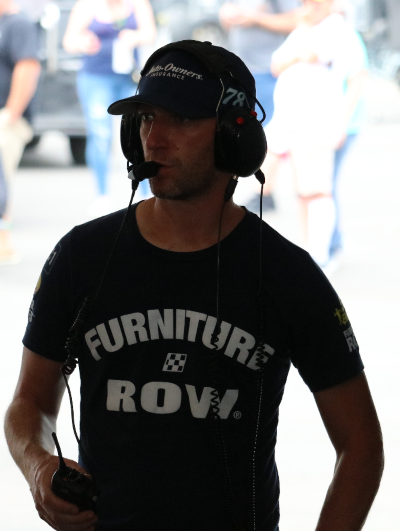
- Pearn in 2018
- Born: Cole R. Pearn; October 13, 1982 (age 44); Mount Brydges, Ontario, Canada
- Achievements: 2017 Monster Energy NASCAR Cup Series champion crew chief 2006 Great Canadian 300 race winner

NASCAR Canada Series career
- 27 races run over 4 years
- Best finish: 14th (2003)
- First race: 2000 CarQuest 300 (Delaware)
- Last race: 2003 Molson Canadian CASCAR Championship Showdown (Cayuga)
| Wins | Top tens | Poles |
|---|---|---|
| 0 | 3 | 0 |

Cole R. Pearn (born October 13, 1982) is a Canadian NASCAR crew chief and former stock car racing driver. He competed in CASCAR (now NASCAR Canada Series) for three seasons from 2001 to 2003. He also was a three-time Canadian Go-Kart Champion, Delaware Speedway Track Champion and winner of the Great Canadian 300 in 2006. He is currently serving as the crew chief for Martin Truex Jr.'s No. 56 Tricon Garage team in the NASCAR Cup Series. Pearn led Truex to the Cup championship in 2017.

Pearn was considered NASCAR's best active crew chief during his career, having turned Furniture Row Racing from a backmarker to a championship contender. Pearn was the crew chief responsible for 17 of the team's 18 race wins.

== Career ==
Pearn, a three-time national kart racing champion in Canada, competed in late models. In 2000, Pearn debuted in the CASCAR Super Series at Delaware Speedway, finishing 18th. Pearn competed full-time in 2002 and 2003, driving the No. 24 Pontiac and recording a best finish of sixth twice: in 2002 at Delaware and 2003 at Race City Speedway.

=== Richard Childress Racing: 2007 ===
After graduating from college, Pearn worked for Toyota, and later moved to North Carolina. He joined Richard Childress Racing in 2007, working with Kevin Harvick's No. 29 crew as an engineer.

=== Multiple teams: 2010-2018 ===
In 2010, he joined Furniture Row Racing as a team engineer, though he left for JTG Daugherty Racing in 2011. Pearn returned to FRR during the 2012 season, becoming the team's lead race engineer. On December 3, 2014, Pearn was promoted to crew chief of the No. 78, replacing Todd Berrier, who had departed the team to join Joe Gibbs Racing, and Pearn became the first regular Canadian crew chief in Cup Series history. In 2015, Pearn and driver Martin Truex Jr. won the Axalta "We Paint Winners" 400 at Pocono Raceway, and Pearn became the first Canadian crew chief to win a Cup race. In 2016, Pearn was suspended for the Kobalt 400 after failing technical inspection at the Folds of Honor QuikTrip 500; the team had also been penalized at the Daytona 500 the week before for roof flap problems. During the 2017 season, Pearn and Truex won eight races en route to the series championship. The following year, Pearn and Truex won four races during the year at Fontana, Pocono, Sonoma, and Kentucky. Rumors throughout the year swirled the Furniture Row team after sponsor 5 hour Energy left the team and eventually the team announced they were shutting down. Truex and Pearn made it to the final four again in 2018 and finished second in the final standings.

=== Joe Gibbs Racing: 2019 ===
In 2019, Pearn and Truex moved to Joe Gibbs Racing's No. 19 team following Furniture Row Racing's shutdown after the 2018 season.

On December 9, 2019 Pearn announced that he had parted ways with JGR to pursue opportunities outside of NASCAR. He remained involved in the sport as an analyst for NASCAR.com.

=== Tricon Garage: 2025 ===
On January 16, 2025, it was announced that Pearn would move over to Tricon Garage to crew chief the No. 56 for Martin Truex Jr. in the 2025 Daytona 500.

=== IndyCar ===
In August 2020, Pearn joined IndyCar Series team Ed Carpenter Racing as the lead engineer for Conor Daly in the Indianapolis 500.

== Personal life ==
Pearn's father Ron was a stock car driver at Checker Flag Raceway in Windsor, Ontario. In 2006, he graduated from the University of Waterloo with a mechanical engineering degree.

Pearn is an ice hockey fan and a supporter of the Toronto Maple Leafs; he also plays forward in a Golden-based rec league.

After leaving the crew chief ranks, Pearn moved to British Columbia. He and his wife Carrie operate the lodging chain Golden Alpine Holidays.

== Motorsports career results ==
=== CASCAR ===
(key) (Bold – Pole position awarded by qualifying time. Italics – Pole position earned by points standings or practice time. * – Most laps led.)

==== CASCAR Super Series ====
CASCAR Super Series results
| Year | Car owner | No. | Make | 1 | 2 | 3 | 4 | 5 | 6 | 7 | 8 | 9 | 10 | 11 | 12 | CSSC | Pts | Ref |
|---|---|---|---|---|---|---|---|---|---|---|---|---|---|---|---|---|---|---|
| 2000 | Cole Pearn | 24 | Chevy | EDM | CAL | MSP | DEL; 18 | | | | | | | | | N/A | 0 | |
| 2001 | Cole Pearn | 24 | Chevy | DEL; 17 | PET | MSP | MSP | KWA | TOR | ASE | CTR | HAM | CAL | VAN | DEL; 27 | 46th | 360 | |
| 2002 | Cole Pearn | 24 | Chevy | DEL; 36 | | | | | | | | | | | | 20th | 1540 | |
| 2002 | Cole Pearn | 24 | Pontiac | | PET; 18 | ASE; 17 | MSP; 22 | MSP; 12 | HAM; 19 | TOR; 31 | CAL; 31 | VAN; 30 | MNT; 11 | KWA; 24 | DEL; 6 | 20th | 1540 | |
| 2003 | Cole Pearn | 24 | Pontiac | DEL; 25 | PET; 10 | MSP; 21 | HAM; 21 | TOR; 21 | CAL; 6 | VAN; 11 | ASE; 11 | MSP; 12 | DEL; 15 | PET; 14 | HAM; 28 | 14th | 1566 | |

== See also ==
- List of University of Waterloo people
