= Full Throttle Motor Speedway =

Half-mile race track located in Varney, Ontario

Full Throttle Motor Speedway @ Varney
Canada's Fastest 1/4 Mile High Banked Paved Oval
- Oval
- Location: 312853 Highway 6 Durham, Ontario; Canada
- Coordinates: 44.12520°N 80.80168°W
- Capacity: 6,000 (Estimated)
- Owner: Paul Trepanier
- Operator: Paul Trepanier
- Opened: 1952
- Former names: Varney Motor Speedway (1970–2011); Varney Speedway Motorplex (2012-2013); Varney International Speedway (2020)
- Major events: Current: Ontario Sportsman Series; Grey County 100; Ontario Late Model Association; Can-Am Midget Racing Series; Ontario Pro Challenge

Paved Tri-Oval (1970–present)
- Surface: Asphalt
- Length: 0.25 mi (0.40 km)
- Banking: Turns: 33° (Estimated)
- Race lap record: 12.06 seconds (Kent Nuhn)

Full Throttle Motor Speedway @ Varney (formerly Varney International Speedway) is a 1/4 mile high banked short track motor racing oval, located south of the village of Varney, in Durham, Ontario, Canada. The track hosts a weekly Saturday night stock car racing program that runs from May to September each year.

== History ==
In 1966 brothers Joe and Tom Kennedy purchased a 35-acre property on Highway 6 south of Varney, Ontario. In the fall of 1969 the track was constructed with paving, lights, drainage and the first grandstand. The speedway opened in June 1970 and was operated by the Kennedy family until 1985.

New ownership took over the track in 2014 and renamed the facility Full Throttle Motor Speedway.Former Racer, Gord Bennett, starting many improvements to the track which were later finished under new ownership, again in 2021.

During this time the track started a new developmental program dubbed the Kid Stock Division. This new division was used as a learning program for children ages 12+, who are stepping out of the Junior Late Model Division, to try their hand at racing a full sized car. The division was similar to the Bone Stock class, being a street car installed with necessary safety equipment such as a roll cage, the main difference being the ages of the drivers. The class was discontinued in the new ownership, after the COVID-19 pandemic.

In 2020 the track was renamed Varney International Speedway when ownership also took over the operation of Grand Bend International Speedway and received NASCAR sanctioning for both locations.

In 2021, Paul Trepanier took over ownership of the Speedway and has recently made improvements to the facility, including removing the iconic double-decker grandstand in 2025, and stepping away from the NASCAR sanctioning.

== Speedway classes ==
The tracks weekly racing program features fifteen classes of racing:

- Late Model
- Retro Late Model
- Junior Late Model
- Super Stock
- Street Stock
- Fun Stock
- Mini Stock
- Kid Stock
- Thunder Truck
- Mini Truck
- Junior Mini Truck
- Outlaw Sprints
- Junior Sprint
- Legend Cars
- Crazy Trains

The track also regularly features touring series including the Ontario Sportsman Series, OSCAAR Modifieds, Can-Am Midgets and the Ontario Pro Challenge.

== See also ==
- List of auto racing tracks in Canada
- Grand Bend International Speedway
- Sauble Speedway
- Delaware Speedway
