= Peter Gibbons =

Canadian racing driver (born 1962)

- Born: July 9, 1962 (age 64); Stouffville, Ontario, Canada
- Achievements: 1999, 2000 CASCAR Super Series Champion

NASCAR O'Reilly Auto Parts Series career
- 2 races run over 2 years
- Best finish: 84th (1996)
- First race: 1996 All Pro Bumper to Bumper 300 (Charlotte)
- Last race: 1997 Kenwood Home & Car Audio 300 (Fontana)
Wins	Top tens	Poles
0	0	0

NASCAR FedEx Freight Truck Series career
- Best finish: 117th (2000)
Wins	Top tens	Poles
0	0	0

NASCAR Canada Series career
- 25 races run over 2 years
- Best finish: 3rd (2007)
- First race: 2007 Dodge Dealers 200 (Hamilton)
- Last race: 2008 Dodge Dealers of Ontario 250 (Kawartha)
Wins	Top tens	Poles
0	15	1
- Statistics up to date as of October 20, 2013.

Peter Gibbons (born July 9, 1962) is a Canadian former stock car racing driver. He was the champion of the CASCAR Super Series in 1999 and 2000.

== Racing career ==
Gibbons competed in 81 CASCAR Super Series events, with 17 wins, 40 top-fives, 59 top-tens and eight pole-positions and two championships (1999 and 2000). He also competed in 25 CASCAR East Series events and had three wins, 13 top-fives, 14 top-tens and five pole-positions. He was the runner-up in the 2000 season. Gibbons competed in four CASCAR West Series events, with two top-fives and four top-tens.

Gibbons competed in two NASCAR Busch Series events and failed to qualify in four other races. He also attempted one NASCAR Craftsman Truck Series event but failed to qualify. He competed in 12 events of the NASCAR North Tour and in 25 events in NASCAR Canadian Tire Series.

Gibbons also competed in ten ARCA Racing Series events and failed to qualify for one race. He won a NASCAR Sportsman Division race in 1992 and made 22 total starts in the series between 1990 and 1993.

== Motorsports career results ==
=== NASCAR ===
(key) (Bold – Pole position awarded by qualifying time. Italics – Pole position earned by points standings or practice time. * – Most laps led.)

==== Busch Series ====
NASCAR Busch Series results
Year	Team	No.	Make	1	2	3	4	5	6	7	8	9	10	11	12	13	14	15	16	17	18	19	20	21	22	23	24	25	26	27	28	29	30	NBGNC	Pts
1996	Peter Gibbons	09	Chevy	DAY; DNQ	CAR	RCH	ATL	NSV	DAR	BRI	HCY	NZH	CLT	DOV	SBO	MYB	GLN	MLW	NHA	TAL; DNQ	IRP	MCH	BRI	DAR; DNQ	RCH	DOV	CLT; 23	CAR; DNQ	HOM					84th	94
1997	Peter Gibbons	09	Chevy	DAY	CAR	RCH	ATL	LVS	DAR	HCY	TEX	BRI	NSV	TAL	NHA	NZH	CLT	DOV	SBO	GLN	MLW	MYB	GTY	IRP	MCH	BRI	DAR	RCH	DOV	CLT	CAL; 23	CAR	HOM	93rd	94

==== Craftsman Truck Series ====
NASCAR Craftsman Truck Series results
Year	Team	No.	Make	1	2	3	4	5	6	7	8	9	10	11	12	13	14	15	16	17	18	19	20	21	22	23	24	NCTC	Pts
2000	Peter Gibbons	01	Chevy	DAY; DNQ	HOM	PHO	MMR	MAR	PIR	GTY	MEM	PPR	EVG	TEX	KEN	GLN	MLW	NHA	NZH	MCH	IRP	NSV	CIC	RCH	DOV	TEX	CAL	117th	-
