= OSCAAR =

Canadian stock car racing series

Ontario Stock Car Association of Asphalt Racers
- Ontario's Premier Auto Racing Entertainment Series
- Category: Stock car racing, Modifieds, Outlaw Super Late Models, Hot Rods
- Country: Ontario, Canada
- Inaugural season: 1990
- Drivers' champion: 2025 Hot Rods - (Canada) Tyler Hawn; 2025 Modifieds - (Canada) Steve Trendell
- Official website: OSCAAR

The Ontario Stock Car Association of Asphalt Racers, usually shortened to the acronym OSCAAR, is a Canadian stock car racing series featuring three divisions, Open Wheeled Modifieds, Hot Rods and Pro Sprint. It has been running since 1990, with Dave Burbridge winning the inaugural championship. Previously the series included an Outlaw Super Late Models division. The Super Late Models have returned to the OSCAAR banner for the 2026 season.

== OSCAAR Modified Series ==
The OSCAAR Modified Series was created in 2012 and consists of 450 horsepower asphalt modified stock cars. For the 2026 season, the modifieds will be back running solely under the OSCAAR banner. Overkill Enterprise will be back for their second season as the series title sponsor. 2026 will see the modifieds travel to Flamboro Speedway, Sauble Speedway, Delaware Speedway, Full Throttle Motor Speedway and Peterborough Speedway.

| Year | Champion | Hometown |
|---|---|---|
| 2012 | (Canada) Gary McLean | Conn, Ontario |
| 2013 | (Canada) Gary McLean | Conn, Ontario |
| 2014 | (Canada) Gary McLean | Conn, Ontario |
| 2015 | (Canada) Gary McLean | Conn, Ontario |
| 2016 | (Canada) Gary McLean | Conn, Ontario |
| 2017 | (Canada) Luke Gignac | Port McNicoll, Ontario |
| 2018 | (Canada) Cory Horner | Blackstock, Ontario |
| 2019 | (Canada) A.J. Emms | Orillia, Ontario |
| 2020 | No championship title awarded | |
| 2021 | (Canada) TJ Edwards | Guelph, Ontario |
| 2022 | (Canada) Andy Kamrath | Innisfil, Ontario |
| 2023 | (Canada) Jason Keen | Oakville, Ontario |
| 2024 | (Canada) TJ Edwards | Guelph, Ontario |
| 2025 | (Canada) Steve Trendell | Fergus, Ontario |

== OSCAAR Hot Rod Series ==
The OSCAAR Hot Rod Series is for vintage-bodied cars with crate engines and modern running gear. The cars include Studebakers, Tri-Five Chevrolets, Camaros, Mustangs, and Barracudas of the muscle car era and began in 2017.. The hot rods 2026 title sponsor will be The Fyre Place & Patio Shop. 2026 will see the series travel to Flamboro Speedway, Sauble Speedway, Delaware Speedway, Full Throttle Motor Speedway, Peterborough Speedway and Brighton Speedway.

=== Champions ===
| Year | Champion | Hometown |
|---|---|---|
| 2017 | (Canada) Tyler Hawn | Oro-Medonte, Ontario |
| 2018 | (Canada) Tyler Hawn | Oro-Medonte, Ontario |
| 2019 | (Canada) Tyler Hawn | Oro-Medonte, Ontario |
| 2020 | No championship title awarded | |
| 2021 | (Canada) Steve Book | Brantford, Ontario |
| 2022 | (Canada) Steve Book | Brantford, Ontario |
| 2023 | (Canada) Tyler Hawn | Oro-Medonte, Ontario |
| 2024 | (Canada) Tyler Hawn | Oro-Medonte, Ontario |
| 2025 | (Canada) Tyler Hawn | Oro-Medonte, Ontario |

== OSCAAR Pro Sprint Series ==
The OSCAAR Pro Sprint Series was launched in 2016 and consists of 1/4 scale sprint style cars, powered by 440cc snowmobile engines that generate approximately 85 horsepower. Each car weighs 450 lbs, run one inch off the ground and can reach upwards of 100 mph.

=== Champions ===
| Year | Champion | Hometown |
|---|---|---|
| 2016 | (Canada) Ted Greenwood | Alliston, Ontario |
| 2017 | (Canada) Jordan Hanna | |
| 2018 | (Canada) Daniel Hawn | Oro-Medonte, Ontario |
| 2019 | (Canada) Daniel Hawn | Oro-Medonte, Ontario |
| 2020 | No championship title awarded | |

== OSCAAR Outlaw Super Late Model Series ==
The OSCAAR Outlaw Super Late Model Series was a division in OSCAAR for 27 seasons. The cars consisted of a low-cut, flat-sided late model chassis that were offset to the drivers side for better cornering on oval tracks and allowed the greatest horsepower of any Ontario stock car division. The series final season was in 2017. It was replaced by the new Ontario Outlaw Super Late Model Series the following year. The Super late Models have returned under the OSCAAR banner for the 2026 season after 8 seasons on their own and will have JRS Auctions on as their 2026 title sponsor and see them travel to Flamboro Speedway, Sauble Speedway, Delaware Speedway and Peterborough Speedway.

=== Champions ===
| Year | Champion | Hometown |
|---|---|---|
| 2002 | (Canada) Stu Robinson, Jr. | Holland Landing, Ontario |
| 2003 | (Canada) Stu Robinson, Jr. | Holland Landing, Ontario |
| 2004 | (Canada) Rob Clarke | London, Ontario |
| 2005 | (Canada) Rob Clarke | London, Ontario |
| 2006 | (Canada) John Fletcher | Milton, Ontario |
| 2007 | (Canada) Derrick Tiemersma | Newmarket, Ontario |
| 2008 | (Canada) Glenn Watson | Barrie, Ontario |
| 2009 | (Canada) Glenn Watson | Barrie, Ontario |
| 2010 | (Canada) Glenn Watson | Barrie, Ontario |
| 2011 | (Canada) Glenn Watson | Barrie, Ontario |
| 2012 | (Canada) Brandon Watson | Stayner, Ontario |
| 2013 | (Canada) Brandon Watson | Stayner, Ontario |
| 2014 | (Canada) Andrew Gresel | Sauble Beach, Ontario |
| 2015 | (Canada) Kevin Cornelius | Orangeville, Ontario |
| 2016 | (Canada) J. R. Fitzpatrick | Cambridge, Ontario |
| 2017 | (Canada) Glenn Watson | Barrie, Ontario |

== Tracks ==
=== Current ===
| Track | City | Province | Length | Banking |
|---|---|---|---|---|
| Brighton Speedway | Brighton; 44.039597°N 77.672152°W | Ontario | 1/3 mile clay oval | |
| Delaware Speedway | Delaware; 42°55′49″N 81°25′4″W | Ontario | 1/2 Mile | Turns 5°-7° |
| Flamboro Speedway | Hamilton; 43.328234°N 80.023583°W | Ontario | 1/3 Mile | |
| Peterborough Speedway | Peterborough; 44.28174°N 78.42649°W | Ontario | 1/3 Mile | |
| Sauble Speedway | Sauble Beach; 44.62744°N 81.21400°W | Ontario | 1/4 Mile | |
| Full Throttle Motor Speedway | Varney; 44.12520°N 80.80168°W | Ontario | 1/4 Mile | Turns 30° |

=== Former ===
| Track | City | Province | Length | Banking |
|---|---|---|---|---|
| Barrie Speedway | Barrie; 44°28′38″N 79°30′54″W | Ontario | 1/3 Mile Tri-Oval | Progressive |
| Grand Bend Speedway | Grand Bend; 43.2911°N 81.7182°W | Ontario | 1/4 Mile Tri-Oval | 12° |
| Jukasa Motor Speedway | Cayuga; 42.935061°N 79.966565°W | Ontario | 5/8 Mile | Turns 8.5° |
| Kawartha Speedway | Fraserville; 44°12′32″N 78°23′30″W | Ontario | 3/8 Mile | |
| Mosport Speedway | Bowmanville; 44°3′7″N 78°41′4″W | Ontario | 1/2 Mile | Turns 6° |
| Sunset Speedway | Innisfil; 44.28028°N 79.61067°W | Ontario | 1/3 Mile | |

== See also ==
- NASCAR Pinty's Series
- APC United Late Model Series
