= APC United Late Model Series =

Canadian stock car racing series

- Category: Late model stock cars
- Country: Ontario; Canada
- Inaugural season: 2015
- Manufacturers: Chevrolet · Toyota · Ford
- Drivers' champion: (Canada) Kyle Steckly
- Official website: APC United Late Model Series

The APC United Late Model Series is a late model stock car racing series competing at short track ovals in Ontario, Canada.

== Background ==
The series was founded in 2015 with the purpose of revitalizing late model stock car racing at paved short oval tracks in Southern Ontario. The touring series consists of seven to ten races per year running from May until September and has competed at six different Ontario race tracks.

The first race took place on May 23, 2015 at Sunset Speedway and was won by Dwayne Baker. The series has a title sponsorship with APC Auto Parts Centres, a Canadian auto parts supplier and retail chain.

== Tracks ==
The following are the tracks which have been or are currently used in the APC United Late Model Series:

Years	Track	Location	Province	Length	Banking
2015–Present	Delaware Speedway	Delaware; 42°55′49″N 81°25′4″W	Ontario	1/2 Mile	Turns 5°-7°
2015–Present	Flamboro Speedway	Millgrove; 43.328234°N 80.023583°W	Ontario	1/3 Mile	
2017–2020	Jukasa Motor Speedway	Cayuga; 42.935061°N 79.966565°W	Ontario	5/8 Mile	Turns 8.5°
2015-2018, 2022–Present	Peterborough Speedway	Cavan; 44.28174°N 78.42649°W	Ontario	1/3 Mile	
2016–Present	Sauble Speedway	Sauble Beach; 44.62744°N 81.21400°W	Ontario	1/4 Mile	
2015–Present	Sunset Speedway	Innisfil; 44.28028°N 79.61067°W	Ontario	1/3 Mile	

== Champions ==
Year	Champion	Number	Engine
2015	(Canada) Dale Shaw	#83	Chevrolet
2016	(Canada) Andrew Gresel	#81	Ford
2017	(Canada) Brandon Watson	#9	Ford
2018	(Canada) J. R. Fitzpatrick	#84	Chevrolet
2019	(Canada) Matt Pritiko	#21	Toyota
2020	(Canada) Jo Lawrence	#78	Chevrolet
2021	(Canada) Brandon Watson	#9	Ford
2022	(Canada) J. R. Fitzpatrick	#84	Chevrolet
2023	(Canada) Kyle Steckly	#22	Chevrolet
2024	(Canada) Kyle Steckly	#22	Chevrolet
2025	(Canada) Josh Stade	#17	Toyota

== Rookies of the Year ==
Year	Rookie of the Year	Number
2015	(Canada) Billy Schwartzenburg	#86
2016	(Canada) Shae Gemmell	#3
2017	(Canada) Treyten Lapcevich	#32
2018	(Canada) Jake Sheridan	#52
2019	(Canada) Jo Lawrence	#78
2020	(Canada) Gary Adriaensen	#55
2021	(Canada) Connor James	#4
2022	(Canada) Kyle Steckly	#22

== See also ==
- NASCAR Pinty's Series
- OSCAAR - Ontario Stock Car Association of Asphalt Racers
