= Sauble Speedway =

Racetrack

- Location: 1199 Bruce Road 14; Hepworth, Ontario; Canada
- Coordinates: 44.62744°N 81.21400°W
- Owner: Paul and Lia Gresel, Jeff and Tina Cassidy
- Operator: Paul Gresel Jeff Cassidy and Brad Holmes
- Opened: 1969
- Major events: APC United Late Model Series (2016-Present) OSCAAR Modifieds; OSCAAR Hot Rods; OSCAAR Pro Sprint Ontario Sportsman Series Ontario Outlaw Super Late Models Can-Am Midget Racing Series INEX Legends Series
- Website: http://saublespeedway.ca/

Oval
- Surface: Asphalt
- Length: 0.250 mi (0.402 km)

Sauble Speedway is a 1/4 mile short track motor racing oval, located east of the beach community Sauble Beach, in Hepworth, Ontario, Canada. The track hosts a weekly Saturday night stock car racing program that runs from May to September each year, with additional Sunday night races on long weekends.

== Overview ==
The speedway originally opened in 1969 as a 1/4 mile dirt track but was paved prior to the start of the 1971 season.

The tracks weekly racing program features the Sauble Late model class, four cylinder Epic Racewear Bone Stocks, the Sauble Steel Body Hotrods, the ImageWraps Legends, and Junior Late Models. The track also regularly features touring series including the APC United Late Model Series, Ontario Sportsman Series, OSCAAR Modifieds, Hot Rods and Pro Sprints, the Ontario Outlaw Super Late Model Series, Can-Am Midgets and INEX Legend Cars.

The track was purchased in 2017 by local business owners Paul and Lia Gresel. The facility received NASCAR sanctioning in 2018 and joined the NASCAR Whelen All-American Series.

In 2021 Jeff and Tina Cassidy became partners of the speedway. In 2022 John Karley was brought on as the General Manager. Brad Holmes was then hired as General Manager in October 2023.

In 2025, the site became the home of the Sauble Beach Party, a concert festival.

== 2026 Schedule ==
The 2026 Schedule features the same touring series seen in previous years, as well as a resurgence of the Street Stock class, a V8 car with an older body style, typically a fourth generation Chevrolet Monte Carlo.

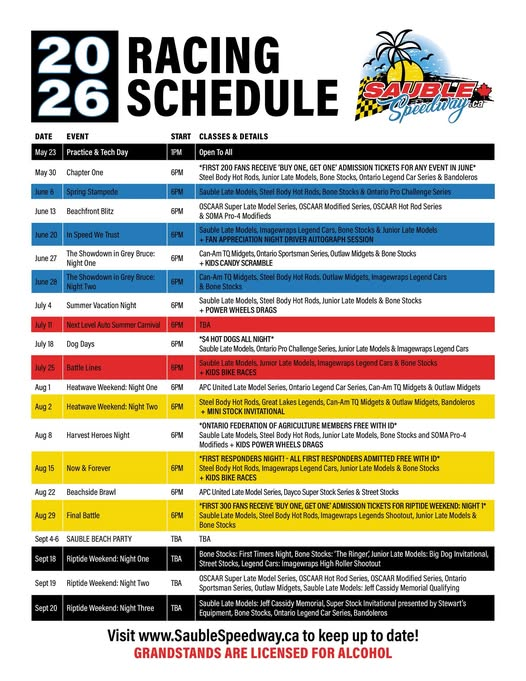
Sauble Speedway 2026 Schedule

== See also ==
- List of auto racing tracks in Canada
- Sunset Speedway
- Delaware Speedway
