= Flamboro Speedway =

Racetrack

Coordinates: 43.328234°N 80.023583°W

- Oval (1962–present)
- Location: 873 5th Concession Road West; Millgrove, Ontario, Canada
- Owner: John Casale & Frank Casale
- Operator: John Casale & Frank Casale
- Opened: 1962
- Major events: Current: APC United Late Model Series (2015–present); Former: NASCAR Pinty's Series (2020–2021); CASCAR Super Series (1988–1989)
- Website: http://flamborospeedway.net/

Paperclip Oval (1962–present)
- Surface: Paved
- Length: 0.536 km (0.333 mi)
- Banking: Semi-banked

Flamboro Speedway is a 0.333 mi (0.536 km) semi-banked asphalt short track motor racing oval, located twenty minutes northwest of Hamilton, in the rural community of Millgrove, Ontario, Canada. The track was established in 1962.

== Overview ==
The track hosts a weekly Saturday night stock car racing program that runs from May to October each year. The tracks weekly racing program features five categories: Pro-Late Model, Super Stocks, Mini Stocks, Pure Stocks and Pro 4 Modified.

The track also regularly features touring series including the APC United Late Model Series, Ontario Sportsman Series, OSCAAR Modifieds, Hot Rods and Pro Sprints, the Ontario Outlaw Super Late Model Series, Can-Am Midgets and Legends car racing.

Flamboro speedway has a go-kart track contained within the oval; which is utilized by the Waterloo Region Karting Club.

In 2011, the speedway celebrated its 50th anniversary.

== NASCAR Pinty's Series ==
The NASCAR Pinty's Series made its first trip to Flamboro Speedway for a doubleheader event on August 29, 2020. Jason Hathaway and Kevin Lacroix won races during the inaugural event.

Season	Date	Race title	Driver	Manufacturer
2020	August 29	Pinty's 125	(Canada) Jason Hathaway	Chevrolet
2020	August 29	PartyCasino 125	(Canada) Kevin Lacroix	Dodge
2021	September 12	Motomaster Batteries 125	(Canada) Andrew Ranger	Dodge

== See also ==
- Short track motor racing
- Oval track racing
- List of sports venues in Hamilton, Ontario
