= Peterborough Speedway =

Racetrack

Canada’s Toughest 1/3 Mile Oval
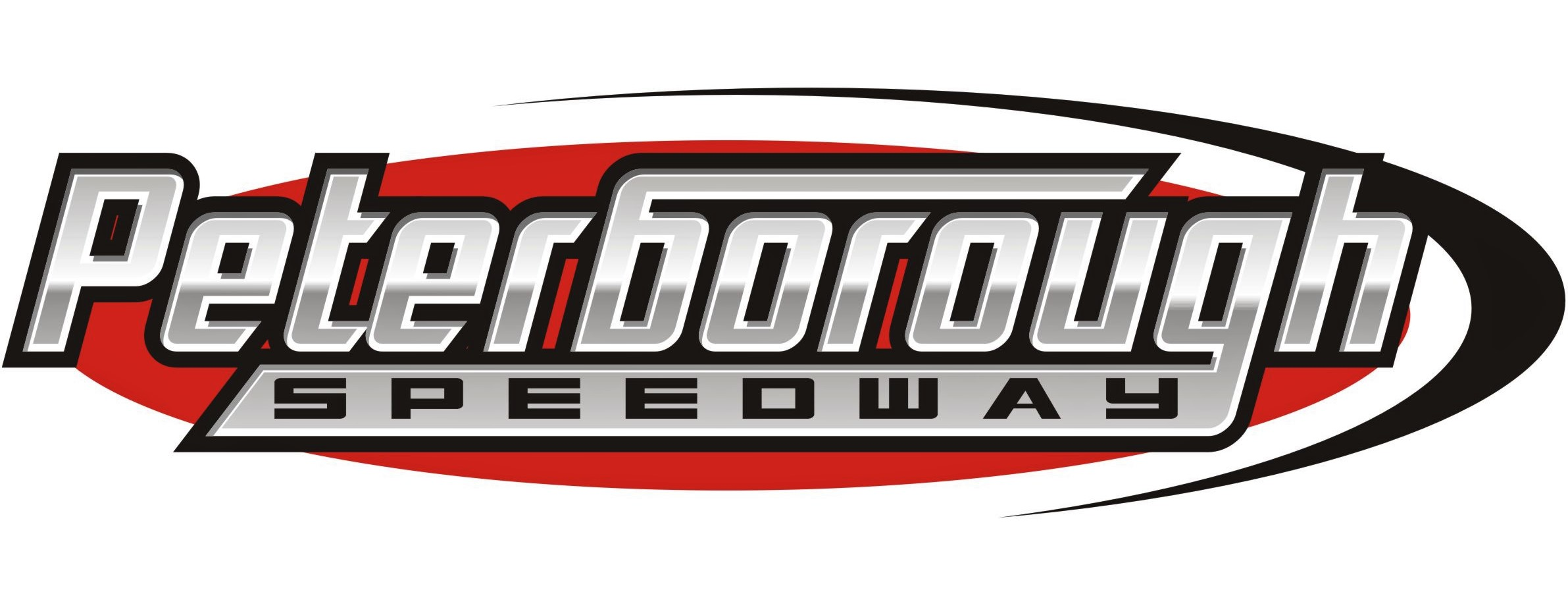

- Oval (1967–present)
- Location: 1710 Mount Pleasant Road. Cavan, Ontario; Canada
- Coordinates: 44.2817529°N 78.4264907°W
- Capacity: 4,800
- Owner: Jean-Paul (JP) Josiasse
- Operator: Jean-Paul (JP) Josiasse
- Opened: May 28, 1967
- Former names: Westgate Speedway
- Major events: Autumn Colours Classic (1993-Present) CASCAR Super Series (1991, 1993-1999) APC United Late Model Series (2015-2018, 2022-Present) OSCAAR Modifieds; OSCAAR Hot Rods; OSCAAR Pro Sprint Ontario Sportsman Series Ontario Outlaw Super Late Models Can-Am Midget Racing Series Ontario Legends Series Ontario Pro Challenge Series
- Website: http://www.peterboroughspeedway.com/

Semi-Banked Oval
- Surface: Asphalt
- Length: 0.333 mi (.536 km)

Peterborough Speedway is a 1/3 mile semi-banked short track motor racing paved oval, located west of the city of Peterborough, in Cavan, Ontario, Canada. The Speedway's weekly Saturday night racing program runs from May to October each year, featuring Bone Stocks, Mini Stocks, Renegade Trucks, Legends, Super Stock and Late Models. The track regularly features touring series including the APC United Late Model Series, OSCAAR Modifieds and Hot Rods, Ontario Outlaw Super Late Models, Can-Am Midgets and their season finishes with the annual Autumn Colours Classic weekend.

== History ==
Peterborough Speedway was known as Westgate Speedway when it opened for the first time on Sunday May 28, 1967. The four original owners from the Peterborough area built the track at a cost of $70,000. New ownership renamed the facility Peterborough Speedway in 1986 and the track celebrated its 50th anniversary in 2017.

== Autumn Colours Classic ==
Since 1993, Peterborough Speedway has presented the "Autumn Colours Classic" during the Thanksgiving holiday weekend in October. The three days of racing features close to 10 different divisions of drivers and teams from across the province and is considered one of the most important stock car events in Ontario.

== See also ==
- List of auto racing tracks in Canada
- Kawartha Speedway
- Mosport Speedway
