= CASCAR Super Series =

Canadian stock car touring division

- Category: Stock cars
- Country: Canada
- Inaugural season: 1986
- Folded: 2006
- Constructors: Chevrolet · Dodge · Ford
- Last Drivers' champion: J. R. Fitzpatrick
- Last Makes' champion: Chevrolet

The CASCAR Super Series was Canada's premier stock car touring division. It was sanctioned by CASCAR. The series ended after the 2006 season after NASCAR purchased CASCAR, and NASCAR used it as the basis for the NASCAR Pinty's Series.

General Tire served as the series' title sponsor from 1988 to 1990, followed by Budweiser in 1993. Castrol held the naming rights from 1994 to the final season in 2006.

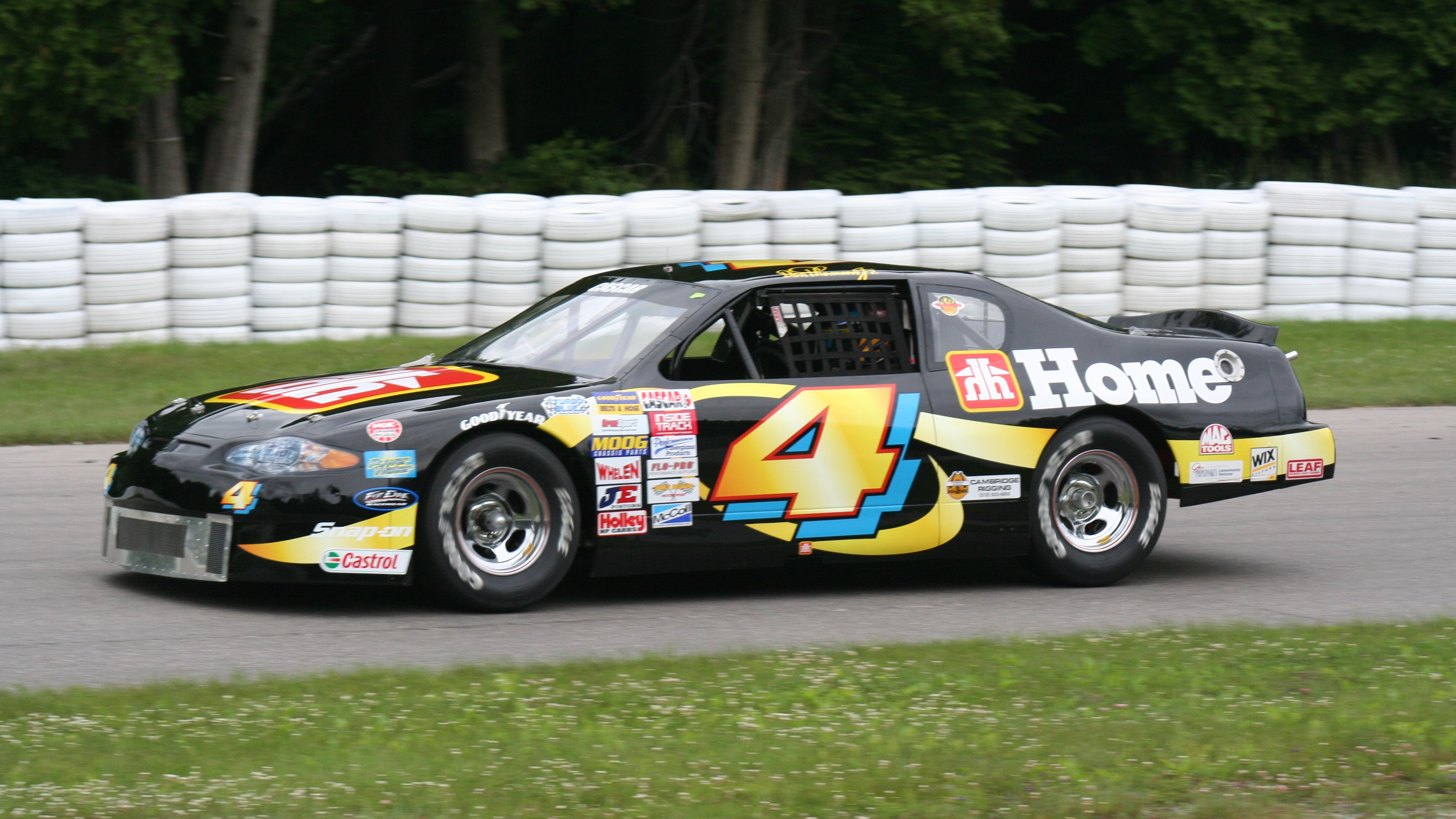
Five Time CASCAR Super Series Champion Don Thomson Jr. in 2005

A western counterpart called the CASCAR West Super Series began racing in 1992, replacing CASCAR's Hobby Stock division. In addition to being its own championship, the West Super Series conducted combination races with the national series.

== Past champions ==
| Year | Champion | Number |
|---|---|---|
| 1986* | Ken Johnston | No. 42 |
| 1987 | Barry Harmer | No. 26 |
| 1988 | Andy Farr | No. 04 |
| 1989 | Steve Robblee | No. 32 |
| 1990 | Wayne Keeling | No. 62 |
| 1991 | Dave Whitlock | No. 29 |
| 1992 | Steve Robblee | No. 32 |
| 1993 | Kerry Micks | No. 02 |
| 1994 | Mark Dilley | No. 64 |
| 1995 | Sean Dupuis | No. 7 |
| 1996 | Dan Shirtliff | No. 3 |
| 1997 | Dave Whitlock | No. 98 |
| 1998 | Dave Whitlock | No. 98 |
| 1999 | Peter Gibbons | No. 1 |
| 2000 | Peter Gibbons | No. 1 |
| 2001 | Don Thomson Jr. | No. 4 |
| 2002 | Don Thomson Jr. | No. 4 |
| 2003 | Don Thomson Jr. | No. 4 |
| 2004 | Don Thomson Jr. | No. 4 |
| 2005 | Don Thomson Jr. | No. 4 |
| 2006 | J. R. Fitzpatrick | No. 84 |

- * – All events held at Delaware Speedway

== Tracks ==
| Years | Track | Location | Type |
|---|---|---|---|
| 2000 | Autodrome Chicoutimi | Chicoutimi, Québec | 1/3 Mile Oval |
| 2002 | Autodrome Montmagny | Montmagny, Quebec | 3/8 Mile Oval |
| 1993–2003, 2005–2006 | Autodrome Saint-Eustache | St-Eustache, Quebec | 2/5 Mile Oval |
| 1989–1995, 2005–2006 | Barrie Speedway | Barrie, Ontario | 1/3 Mile Tri-Oval |
| 1993–1994, 1996–2001, 2003 | Bridge City Speedway | Saskatoon, Saskatchewan | 1/3 Mile Oval |
| 1989–2006 | Cayuga Speedway | Cayuga, Ontario | 5/8 Mile Oval |
| 1991–1992 | Checkered Flag Speedway | Windsor, Ontario | Oval |
| 1988–1997 | Capital City Speedway | Ottawa, Ontario | 3/8 Mile Oval |
| 2006 | Circuit Gilles Villeneuve | Montreal, Quebec | 2.71 Mile Road Course |
| 1996–1999 | Circuit Ste-Croix | Sainte-Croix, Quebec | 5/8 Mile Oval |
| 2001, 2006 | Circuit Trois-Rivières | Trois-Rivières, Quebec | 1.53 Mile Street Circuit |
| 1986–2005 | Delaware Speedway | Delaware, Ontario | 1/2 Mile Oval |
| 1998–2000 | Edmonton International Raceway | Wetaskiwin, Alberta | 1/4 Mile Oval |
| 1990 | Exhibition Stadium | Toronto, Ontario | 1/3 Mile Oval |
| 1988–1989 | Flamboro Speedway | Hamilton, Ontario | 1/3 MileOval |
| 2001–2002, 2004–2006 | Kawartha Speedway | Fraserville, Ontario | 3/8 Mile Oval |
| 1999–2005 | Molson Indy Toronto | Toronto, Ontario | 1.75 Mile Street Circuit |
| 2001–2004 | Molson Indy Vancouver | Vancouver, British Columbia | 1.78 Mile Street Circuit |
| 1991–1992, 1996, 1999–2000 | Mosport Speedway | Bowmanville, Ontario | 1/2 Mile Oval |
| 1998–2006 | Mosport International Raceway | Bowmanville, Ontario | 2.459 Mile Road Course |
| 1991, 1993–1999 | Peterborough Speedway | Peterborough, Ontario | 1/3 Mile Oval |
| 1993–2001, 2003, 2005 | Race City Motorsport Park | Calgary, Alberta | 1/2 Mile Oval |
| 1991 | Sanair Super Speedway | Saint-Pie, Quebec | 9/10 Mile Oval |
| 1996 | Sauble Speedway | Sauble Beach, Ontario | 1/4 Mile Oval |
| 1989–1991, 1995 | Shannonville Motorsport Park | Shannonville, Ontario | Road Course |
| 1997–2000 | Speedway 660 | Geary, New Brunswick | 1/3 Mile Oval |
| 2005–2006 | SunValley Speedway | Vernon, British Columbia | 1/2 Mile Oval |
| 2006 | Sutherland Automotive Speedway | Saskatoon, Saskatchewan | 1/3 Mile Oval |
