= Delaware Speedway =

Half-mile race track located in Delaware, Ontario

A Canadian Racing Landmark Since 1952
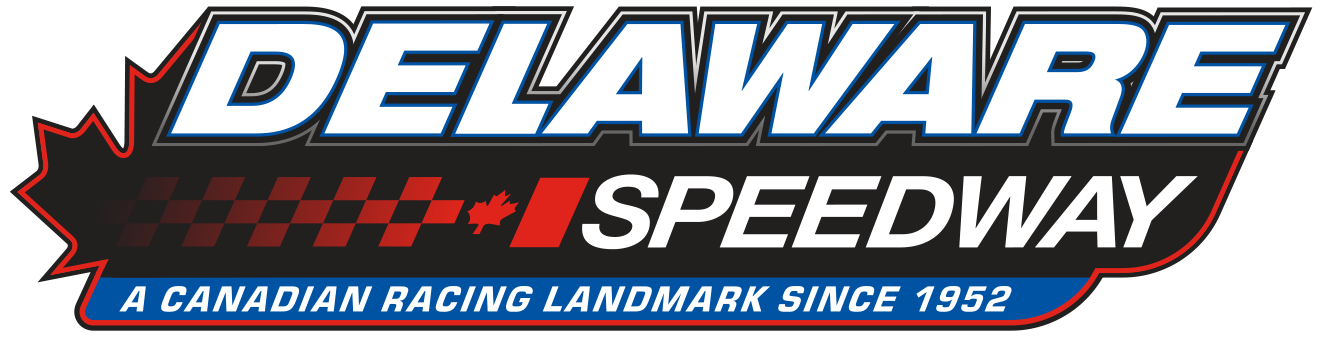

- Oval (1969–present)
- Location: 1640 Gideon Drive; Delaware, Ontario; N0L 1E0
- Coordinates: 42°55′49″N 81°25′04″W
- Capacity: 10,000 (Estimated)
- Owner: The Delaware Group (2021–present)
- Operator: The Delaware Group (2021–present)
- Opened: 1952
- Former names: Brodie's Delaware Speedway; Delaware International Speedway; Delaware Speedway Park
- Major events: Current: NASCAR Canada Series; NASCAR Canada Series 250 (2009–2013, 2017, 2021–present); APC United Late Model Series; AcDelco 100 (2015–present); Castrol Great Canadian 300 (2015–present); ISMA Supermodifieds (2006–2019, 2025–present); Ontario Sportsman Series; Derek's Mowers’n Blowers 100 (2008–present); Iron Man 100 (2008–present); Former: NASCAR Whelen Modified Tour (2011); Summer Showdown (2010–2012); ARCA Lincoln Welders Truck Series (2005–2006); NASCAR Dodge Weekly Series (2004–2005); CASCAR Super Series (1986–2005); CASCAR East Series (1998–2000); ARCA Super Car Series (1987–1992)
- Website: https://delawarespeedway.com/

Paved Egg Oval (1969–present)
- Surface: Asphalt
- Length: 0.805 km (0.500 mi)
- Banking: Turns: 5–7° (Estimated)
- Race lap record: 0:14.945 ( (United States) Tyler Shullick, super modified racing, 2025, ISMA Supermodifieds)

Paved Oval (1960–1968)
- Surface: Asphalt
- Length: 0.402 km (0.250 mi)

Original Dirt Oval (1952–1959)
- Surface: Dirt
- Length: 0.402 km (0.250 mi)

Delaware Speedway is a 0.500 mi (0.805 km) paved race track in Delaware, Ontario, that is one of the oldest continuously operating tracks in Canada.

The track opened in 1952 as a 0.250 mi (0.402 km) dirt track that was paved in 1960. In August 1969, the track was expanded to a 0.500 mi (0.805 km) paved oval and continues today.

== Divisions ==
The track hosts four different divisions as part of its home classes (Late Model, Super Stock, V8 Stock, Bone Stock). They also host the King of the Hill spectators races.

=== Pro Late Models ===
The Pro Late Model division has a long history at Delaware Speedway and exhibits close racing and high speeds. The fastest weekly division at Delaware Speedway. Powered by 604 crate engines, these cars produce upwards of 450 horsepower and have high cornering speeds due to their low centre of gravity, aggressive stance and fine-tuned shock and spring setups. The signature event for the Pro Late Models is "The Great Canadian Race" held annually.

=== Super Stocks ===
The Delaware Speedway Super Stock division has seen a large transformation over the past decade, from what was formerly known as the Street Stocks to the muscle car bodied Super Stocks. The Super Stocks have become one of the largest series at the track in terms of number of races and drivers in the series.

=== V8 Stock ===
The V8 Stock division is one of the newest at Delaware Speedway, however the series has roots dating far back into the track's history with the Enduro Series, which thrived in the 80's and 90's. After the collapse of the Enduro series, the V8 Stock division was born as a weekly series. These full bodied stock cars and trucks have in a way taken over where the Street Stock division was in the 90's before its evolution to the Super Stocks. In recent years the V8 Stock Series has seen car counts grow to record numbers with more drivers entering from the Bone Stocks. In 2019 the Division was combined with the V8 Truck division, allowing drivers to compete with an array of V8 style vehicles.

=== Bone Stocks ===
In an effort to create an easy entry level and add additional entertainment value to the track, the speedway announced in the 2008 Rule package the introduction of a 4-cylinder "Chaos Car". The division was developed by track announcer John Houghton. The class ran in "Novelty" type events before Enduro races and occasionally at the conclusion of the Friday program. Over ten different vehicles were entered into competition in the first year. Race courses included "barrel turns" where drivers had to drive 360 degrees around a barrel before continuing, weaving cones, stop boxes as well as small launch ramps in the season finale. The inaugural "Chaos Car" champion in 2008 was "SnotRod", built by Mark Thyssen and piloted by Tyssen Toll. In 2009, Spencer Rabideau in "Bush Bomb" claimed the title at the season finale in which nine drivers competed. The car count held steady into the beginning of the 2010 season, which finished the year with 12 vehicles competing in the finale in which the championship was won by "Blue Thunder". The 2011 season built on the success regularly starting more than 10 drivers and finishing the year with 15 drivers at the season finale.

The series experienced the largest single-day growth of a division in speedway history with the introduction of the "Bone Stock" format, which updated the Chaos Car rules to fit an old-school 1990's Enduro-type race. The Bone Stock 75 made its debut on October 15, 2011, in which 30 drivers arrived to compete, nearly doubling the size of the division.

=== Open-Wheel Modifieds ===
Originally featured at the track starting in 1993 & dissolving in 2008, the track announced a return of the weekly open wheel modifieds for the 2025 season.

== Former Divisions ==
=== CASCAR Sportsman ===
Using the same cars featured in the CASCAR SuperSeries, the large majority of CASCAR Sportsman drivers competed in a Chevrolet Monte Carlo, Ford Taurus, Pontiac Grand Prix or Dodge Intrepid. Other body styles are allowed (including Thunderbirds, Luminas, Avengers, etc.), providing it is a 1992 or later model. CASCAR Sportsman cars use fiberglass bodies and have fabricated chassis.

The CASCAR Sportsman class era ended at Delaware Speedway in 2005, when the track dropped CASCAR from its schedule, also leaving the NASCAR Dodge Weekly Series that same year, dropping the CASCAR style chassis for a more modern pro late model.

=== Junior Racing League ===
The Junior Racing League used to race on Wednesday nights on a special roadcourse in the infield. The drivers (aged 8–17) years old race 1/2 scale late model stock cars. The program was formerly known as the "CASCAR Junior Program" and was founded in 1997. Racing is divided into two divisions - Junior (8–12 years old) and Senior (13–17 years old). The program has seen many drivers graduate to higher divisions in racing, including J. R. Fitzpatrick. The program ended in 2018.

=== Truck Series ===
Merged with the V8 Stock series.

=== Enduro Series ===
The Enduro series at Delaware Speedway concluded with the 2017 iceMaker Enduro 150 event, which was the final race of the 2017 season. This event was a modern take on the classic Enduro, featuring a red flag/green flag system and no caution flags.

== History ==
=== Opening (1952) ===
The track was opened in 1952 by Hugh Brodie as a 0.250 mi (0.402 km) dirt track and operated as such until it became a 0.250 mi (0.402 km) paved oval in 1960. Expansion to its present-day 0.500 mi (0.805 km) paved track configuration took place in 1969.

=== Super Modifieds (1970s) ===
The 0.500 mi (0.805 km) asphalt surface is said to have been specifically built to accommodate super modified racing. The "Supers" raced at the speedway from the 1970s through the 1980s before being dropped from the racing card and replaced with Super Late models. Super Modified racing did not return to Delaware Speedway until 2006 when the International Supermodified Association (ISMA) touring series made a stop. The series continued to attend the track until 2019.

=== CASCAR era (1981–2005) ===
The history of CASCAR and Delaware Speedway are very closely connected together. Delaware is widely recognized as the "Birthplace of CASCAR". The promoter of CASCAR, Tony Novotny was simultaneously promoter of both CASCAR Operations and Delaware Speedway before selling the track in 2001.

The track hosted CASCAR Super Series races from 1986 until 2005 when Delaware Speedway dropped CASCAR from its schedule in the same year the track left the NASCAR Dodge Weekly Series after a two-year membership. The reason for the drop was delays in the delivery of the CASCAR schedule, prompting Delaware to fill the 2 annual CASCAR dates with its own events. Observers also cited strained relations between the track and CASCAR over the series' operations being controlled by its impending buyer NASCAR. All of the CASCAR Super Series' races in 1986 were held at the track, Ken Johnston was the champion.

=== NASCAR Dodge Weekly Series (2004–2005) ===
Delaware Speedway became the first Canadian track to be a member of the NASCAR Dodge Weekly Series in the 2004 season. At the conclusion of the 2005 racing season, the speedway cancelled its NASCAR sanctioning at the same time as it dropped its CASCAR Super Series events. During the period after a series of rainouts and under the NASCAR rules at the time, the speedway was forced to run a number of double feature nights to make the minimum number of races required under the NASCAR program. With double feature nights increasing the weekly payout and not increasing the number of fans, the speedway reconsidered its place within NASCAR.

=== Independent period (2006–2008) ===
Following the end of NASCAR sanctioning the speedway management set about a focus on building the profile of its weekly racing programs. The track worked with the Ontario-based inter-speedway organization Weekend Warrior Series (WWS) in an attempt to increase travel between Ontario-based speedways and also introduced new Late Model events such as the annual Canada Day PartSource 140 and giving the former CASCAR 300-lap Labour Day race to the division.

At the beginning of the 2007 racing season the track General Manager and Operations Director resigned from the speedway. Jeff Wilcox was put in place as Operations Manager and the 2007 race season went ahead as scheduled. Wilcox would remain operations manager until the conclusion of his term at the end of the 2008 racing season.

=== New ownership and return to NASCAR (2009–2011) ===
On January 21, 2009, the speedway formally announced that one of the business's part owners, Arlen Scherba, had bought out the other business partners to become the sole owner of the speedway business. In the same release, the track announced its return NASCAR weekly sanctioning under the NASCAR Whelen All-American Series banner. The release also indicated that the speedway land lease was no longer a concern.

A new operations manager had been put in place before the new year, Paul Houghton, who had previously directed the track's Junior Racing League (JRL) program. Jeff Wilcox continued his role as Race Director, and John Houghton continued as Public Relations manager. Joe Czernai would later be added as the track's general manager, part way through the season.

The speedway successfully executed its first NASCAR Canadian Tire Series event on Saturday, June 6, 2009, and repeated the event one year later on June 5, 2010. D. J. Kennington was the winner of both events. The 2009 season also featured numerous track renovations including repaving the majority of the front stretch, new corner lights, and electronic timing and scoring as well as a new ticketing system.

The 2010 Delaware Speedway season schedule was similar to that of 2009, with the addition of a special Summer Showdown featuring NASCAR drivers Kyle Busch, David Reutimann, and Jason Leffler. The event was won by Kyle Busch and was his first win in Canada. The 2010 schedule reduced the Open Wheel Modified series to a smaller schedule as part of retooling efforts for the weekly program, while increasing the number of races for Late Models, Super Stocks, and Trucks.

In 2011, the track hosted a NASCAR Whelen Modified Tour event in September. It also announced plans to expand seating capacity by 600 and replace a number of grandstands to accommodate larger events, but the installation of those grandstands was put on hold shortly after the announcement to make additional preparations. Ron Sheridan, champion in the track's Late Model class, took over as race director in December 2010.

=== DeMelo–Spivak partnership (2012–2021) ===
On December 1, 2011, Arlen Scherba withdrew as owner of the track and the DeMelo and Spivak families became owners of the speedway. The change in ownership was considered historically significant as it represented the first time the lease-holding Spivak family was to have a direct interest in the speedway business.

=== The Delaware Group (since 2021) ===
A new ownership group, The Delaware Group, consisting of Walt Spivak, Jon Aarts (John Aarts Group/J-AAR) and the United Racing Series (Ivor Jones, John Jones and Luke Ramsay) now oversees the track with Dave Graham managing operations under the role of General Manager. Luke Ramsay has assumed the position of President of Delaware Speedway with Darryl Timmermans in the role of Competition Director. The United Racing Series marketing and management team promotes the speedway.

The new ownership group significantly invested in the facility including racetrack surface upgrades that began at the conclusion of the 2021 race season. and they owned the half-mile oval ever since 2021.

== Events ==
The track hosts stock car racing every Friday night during the summer.

=== NASCAR ===
Delaware Speedway hosts one annual NASCAR weekend, the NASCAR Canada Series with the NASCAR Canada 250. Delaware was the site of the Canada Series finale following the closure of Jukasa Motor Speedway until 2023.

=== Other racing events ===
Delaware Speedway annually hosts Monster Truck Throwdown

=== Live Entertainment ===
The track has been host to a concert series called "Rock the Park Presents - Delaware Nights"

== Lap records ==
As of August 2025, the fastest official race lap records at Delaware Speedway are listed as:

Category	Time	Driver	Vehicle	Event/Year
Oval (1969–present)
Super Modified	0:15.383	Tyler Shullick	ISMA Supermodifieds	2025 ISMA-MSS Super Modified 50
NASCAR Canada Series	0:18.894	Brandon Watson	Chevrolet Camaro SS	2022 Pinty's Fall Brawl
Pro Late Model	0:17.928	Connor Pritiko	Chevrolet Camaro SS	2022
Asphalt Super Sprint Car	0:15.682	Ryan Litt	Asphalt Sprint Car	2007
Open Wheel Modifieds	0:18.508	Justin Demelo	Open Wheel modified racing	2015
Super Stocks	0:19.731	Pete Vanderwyst	Chevrolet Camaro SS	2022
V8 Stocks	0:21.121	Gary Adriaensen	V8 Stock	2019
Truck Series	0:21.366	Devon Bloemendal	Chevrolet Silverado	2019
Bone Stocks	0:23.000	Donavin Clark	Pontiac Sunfire	2025
