= Late model =

Vehicle designed for auto racing

Late model racing
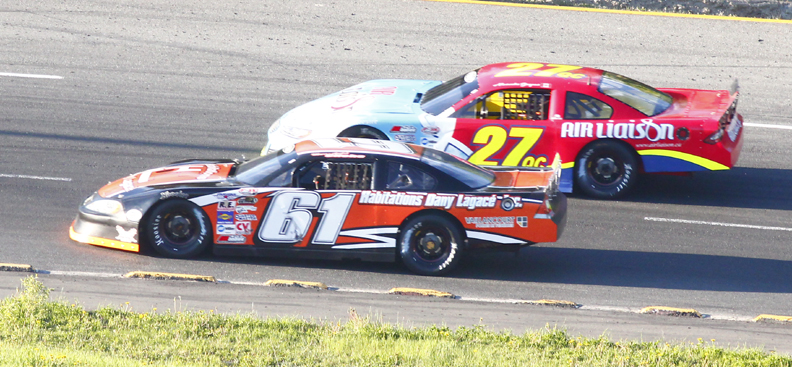
- Category: Stock car racing
- Country: United States, Canada, Mexico, Australia
- Sanctioning Groups: American Canadian Tour (ACT); Championship Racing Association (ASA); APC United Late Model Series; International Motor Contest Association (IMCA); Lucas Oil Late Model Dirt Series; NASCAR (Weekly Series); World Racing Group (World of Outlaws, DIRTcar) zMAX CARS Tour

Late Model stock car racing, also known as late model racing and late models, refers to a type of auto racing that involves purpose-built cars simultaneously racing against each other primarily on oval tracks. This type of racing was early-on characterized by its participants' modification to the engines of post-World War II passenger cars, but the modern day understanding references a class that allows considerable modifications to both the engine and body, yet requires some form of front fender package.

== Overview ==
As the post WWII auto industry began meeting demand for new cars, auto lots were filling up with pre-war coupes and sedans. These 1939-1941 cars, "modified" with souped up engines, were finding their way to competitions at racing ovals converted from horse racing or newly carved out in fields. In 1948 NASCAR became one of the first organizations to standardize the rules to ensure equal competition.

The rulebook mandated that all cars had to be American made, and 1937 or newer, with full stock fenders, running boards and bodies if equipped by the factory, but their bumpers and mufflers had to be removed. Also, a car's wheelbase, length and width had to remain stock, as did the hood. Two years later NASCAR added a division for "lesser modified" cars, which they distinguished as the Sportsman. Specifications for the Sportsman cars mirrored the Modified rules as to bodies and safety, but restricted the degree of engine modifications.

As NASCAR's Grand National cars aged out (current model year and two most recent years only) they became eligible to compete in the Modified and Sportsman division. By 1956 NASCAR had developed a plan to phase out the pre-war coupes and sedans in favor of "Late Models", identified as American cars produced between 1949 and 1955.

Looking to differentiate the Sportsman as a truly separate class, in 1968 NASCAR updated their rules to require 1955 and newer bodies, rebranding the class the Late Model Sportsman Series. NASCAR later reorganized the championship points and events into the touring series that became the Xfinity Series. Earlier car models remained eligible for the Modified division, which evolved to eliminate front fenders.

Since that time, the various sanctioning organizations have developed countless rule packages, but for the last half of century, the "Late Model" class distinction has had little to do with the model year of the car.

== Designs ==
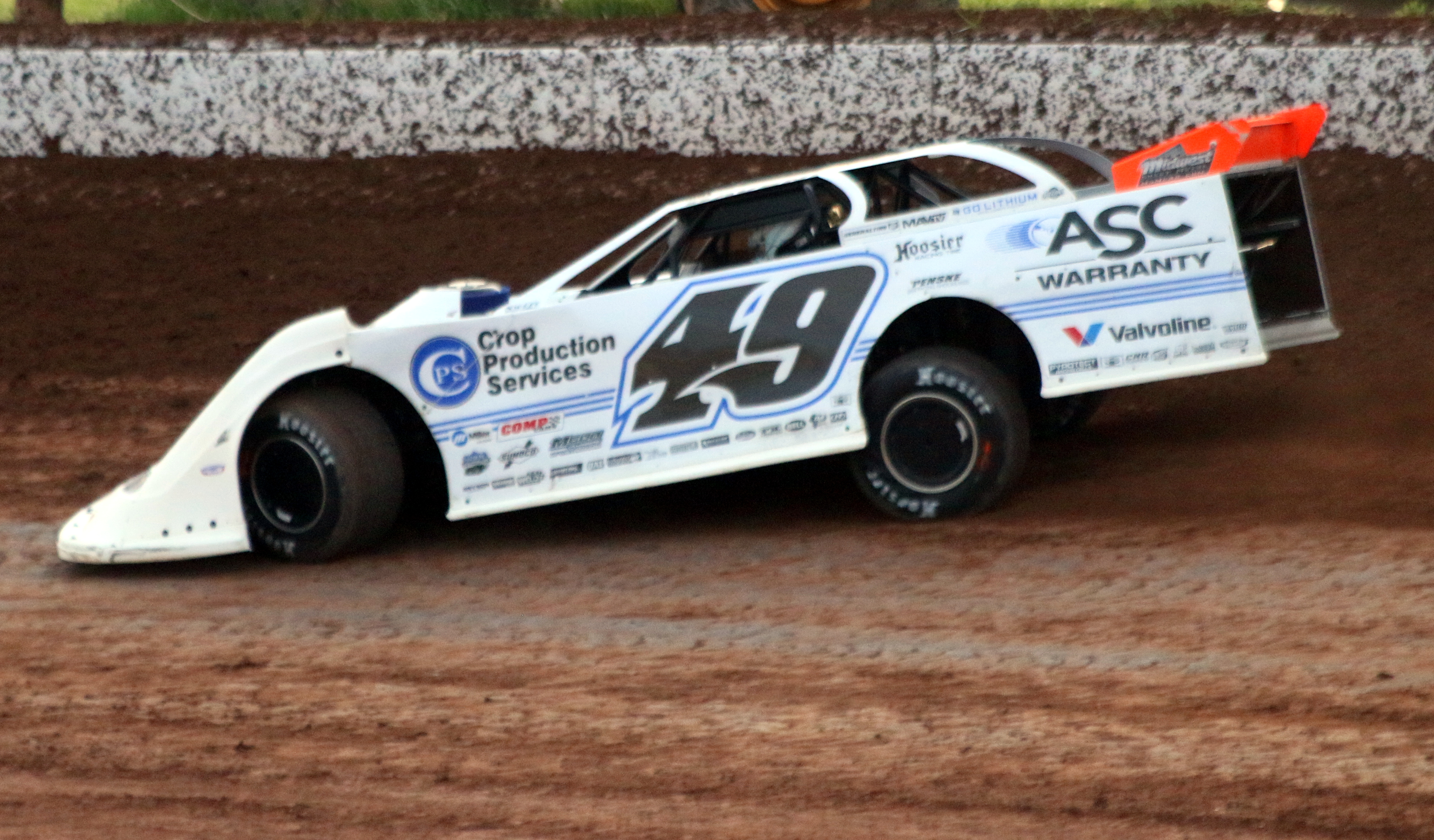
Jonathan Davenport in a dirt super late model in 2018

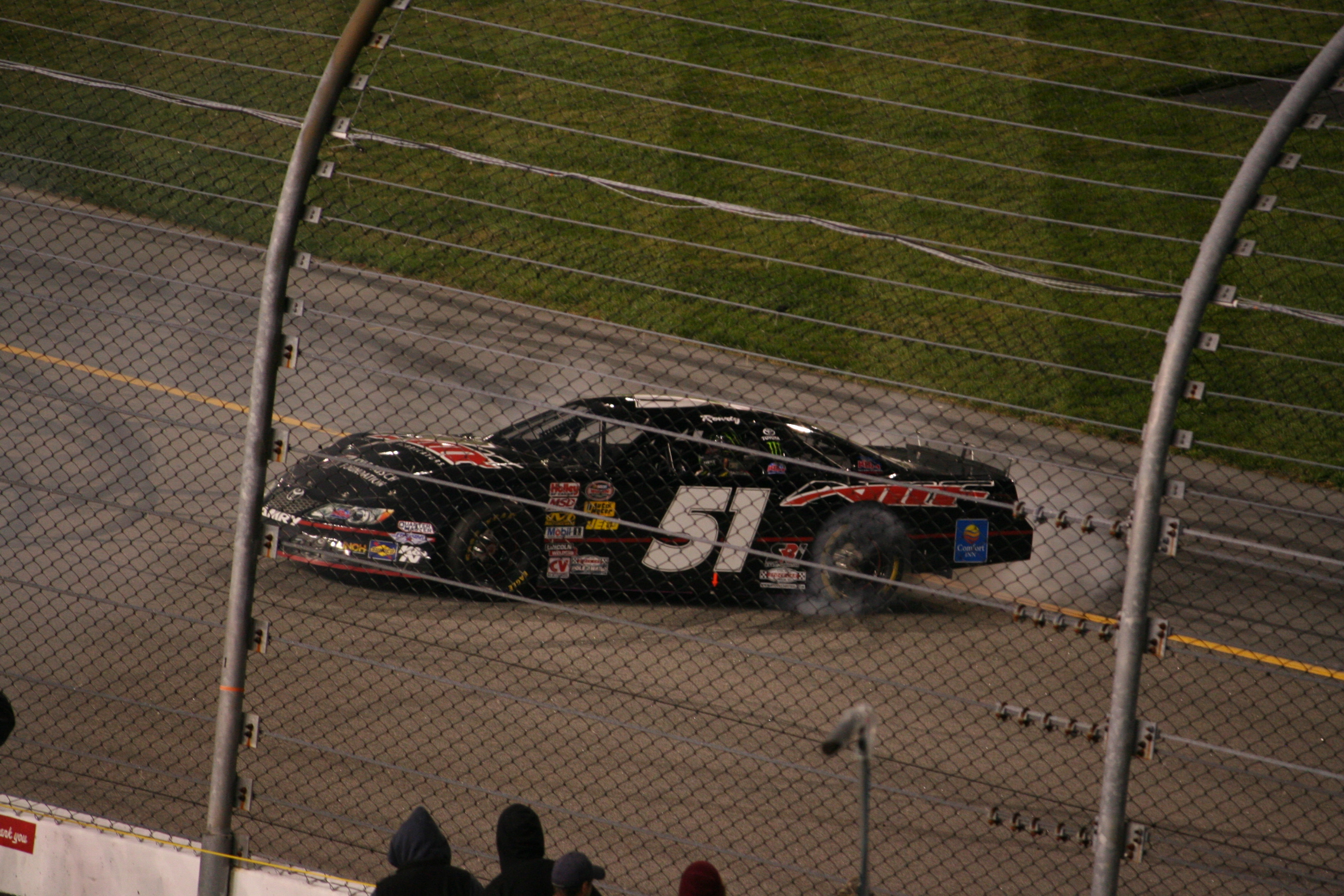
Kyle Busch after winning the Denny Hamlin Short Track Showdown at Richmond Raceway in 2013 in a late model stock car, a perimeter chassis car

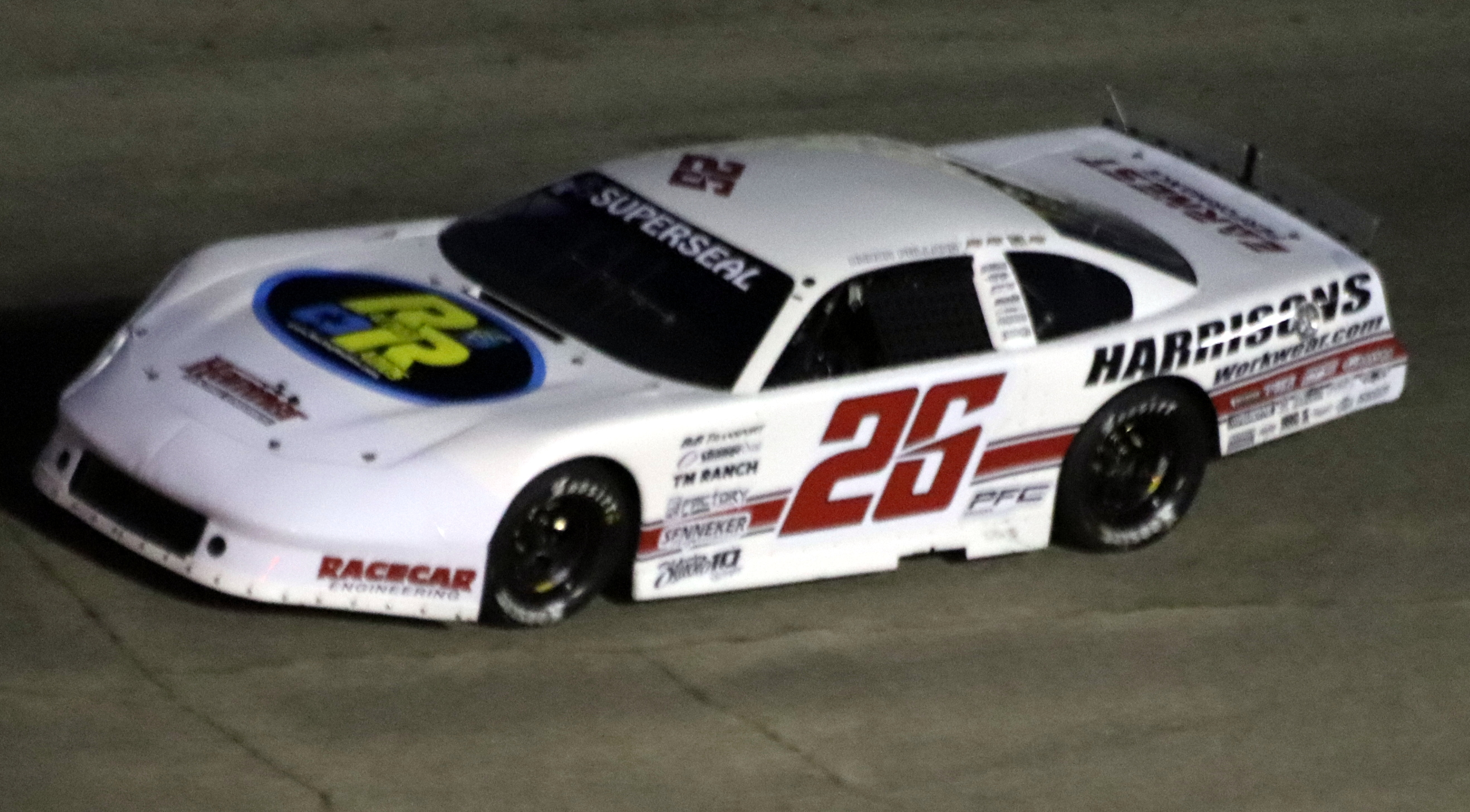
Bubba Pollard in 2019 in an asphalt super late model, a straight rail chassis car

In the late 1970s the costs for the Late Model Sportsman cars became excessive, so the "Late Model Stock Car" was born. Within a few years changes began with the carburetor, and by the mid-1980s the stock front chassis was replaced with a racing clip, for safety and availability. The Late Model that exists today is a full-blown race car with race parts.

Late model race cars now include super late models which have looser rules; late model stock cars and pro late models where cars are more aerodynamically aggressive with lighter bodies and enhanced horsepower; and limited late models which have less horsepower. Vehicles built to race on dirt tracks are significantly different from vehicles raced on asphalt.

=== Body style ===
The bodies on late models were constructed from fiberglass molded to resemble original equipment body panels and able to withstand the rigors of short track racing without the weight. The affordability and availability of sheet aluminum emboldened racers to switch to making their own bodies, as it was cheaper and faster. These individually customized bodies became extreme, and by the mid-1980s a number of dirt track promoters organized as United Midwestern Promoters, standardizing the dimensions for the body panels and requiring a prefabricated hi-impact plastic nose.

Similarly, the asphalt racers began experimenting with downforce bodies, and in 2002 a group of asphalt track promoters met with body manufacturers Aluminum Racing Products (ARP) and Five Star to develop a uniform "Approved Body Configuration". This resulted in the now widely accepted ABC Rulebook.

=== Chassis and suspension ===
There are two types of chassis for asphalt late models. The super late model chassis is offset to favor the left side of the car. Significant items such as the rear end and the engine are positioned on the left, while suspensions are constructed with maximum adjustability in mind. Other asphalt late models use a perimeter rail (symmetrical) chassis, similar to a production car, where there is equal chassis on both sides of the car.

Dirt late model chassis are custom built by manufacturers within standardized dimensions that apply across most classes. There are numerous adjustments on a dirt car compared to those on an asphalt car. Adjustments for dirt include weight changes, rear steer changes, spring changes (four corners and lift arm/pull bar), spring mounting position, J-bar height and angle, stagger, tire compound, and tread design.

=== Engines ===
Across the United States, the class of late model race cars may be referred to as super late models, late model stock cars, pro late models, or limited late models, yet the engine specifications may vary between sanctioning bodies. Open engines are typically American naturally aspirated V8s with upwards of 600 horsepower (450 kW). Otherwise, sanctioning bodies may require crate motors to be utilized which may limit production to 400 horsepower (300 kW) to 500 horsepower (370 kW). The sanctioning bodies often adopt GM 602, 603, and 604 engines or Harrington Enforcers.

== Other racing series ==
Late model racing is a common steppingstone for drivers who race in regional and national touring series. Almost every NASCAR Cup Series driver raced in the class while progressing their career, and many crew chiefs have also developed through this level.

Late model-type cars are also prevalent as a form of cost-cutting in road racing. As many of these oval-track cars can be adjusted to become road race cars with weight balance changes, the SCCA has listed them in the GT America category, and with the affordability of a late model stock car in the category ($30,000 cars with specification engines, and frequently purchased used NASCAR wheels), these cars are prevalent in club racing. Similar rules are used in SCCA Trans-Am TA2 class racing, where the same chassis builders for super late models provide chassis for TA2.

Dirt track late model racing also takes place in Australia. The Australian Late Model Championship has been a feature on the Australian speedway calendar since 2002.

Late model cars can also be seen in simulators such as iRacing.

=== United States national touring series ===
==== Asphalt ====
- American Canadian Tour
- ASA Midwest Tour
- American Speed Association
- CRA Super Series
- Carolina Pro Late Model Series
- CARS Tour
- Northwest Super Late Model Series
- Pro All Stars Series
- South Atlantic Pro Series
- Southern Super Series
- SRL Southwest Tour Series
- United Auto Racing Alliance (UARA)

==== Dirt ====
- Lucas Oil Late Model Dirt Series
- World of Outlaws Late Model Series

=== Canadian touring series ===
==== Asphalt ====
- CASCAR Super Series
- APC United Late Model Series
- Maritime Pro Stock Tour
- Ontario Sportsman Series
- Quebec Sportsman Series
- EASY-KLEEN Super Late Model Series (Atlantic Canada)

== See also ==
- CARS Tour
- National Dirt Late Model Hall of Fame, a United States hall of fame for dirt track late model racers
