= Jukasa Motor Speedway =

Motosport venue in Haldimand County, Ontario, Canada

- Location: 901 Haldimand Road 20; Cayuga, Ontario, Canada
- Coordinates: 42°56′06″N 79°58′00″W
- Capacity: more than 7,000
- Broke ground: 1966
- Opened: 1966; Re-opened 1st time: 2017 (as Jukasa Motor Speedway)
- Closed: Closed 1st time: 2010; Closed 2nd time: November 2021; 5 years ago
- Former names: Cayuga Speedway (1966–2010)
- Major events: NASCAR Pinty's Series; Pinty’s Fall Brawl 200 (2007–2008, 2017–2020); Rankin 200 (2018–2020); APC United Late Model Series; Canadian Short Track Nationals (2017–2020); International Supermodified Association (2018–2019); OSCAAR (2018–2020); ARCA RE/MAX Series (2008); ARCA Lincoln Welders Truck Series (2008); CASCAR Super Series (1989–2006); CARS X1-R Pro Cup (2001–2003); CASCAR East Series (1998–2000); NASCAR North Tour (1983–1985)

Oval Circuit (1966–2010, 2017–2021)
- Surface: Asphalt
- Length: 0.621 mi (1.000 km)
- Banking: Corners: 8.5° Straightaways: 3.5°

The Jukasa Motor Speedway (formerly known as Cayuga Speedway and the Cayuga 2000 Speedway) was an auto racing track located near Cayuga in Haldimand County, Ontario, Canada.

Famous stock car drivers including Dale Earnhardt, Matt Kenseth, Bobby Allison, Benny Parsons, Don Biederman and Dick Trickle have participated in racing events at Jukasa Motor Speedway on a professional level.

== History ==
=== Origins ===
Cayuga International Speedway opened in 1966 as a 1/2-mile D-shaped dirt oval, by an owners group consisting of Frank Mashell, Wayne Conroy, Milton Chesterman, and Jack Greenaigh. Cayuga International Speedway was also increased slightly in size to 0.625 mi (1.006 km) when it was paved but it was still a "D"-shape, the back stretch maintaining a slight but noticeable curve.

A smaller flat oval was built inside the track and used for some race divisions like mini stocks and Can-Am TQ (three quarter) midgets. The smaller oval used part of the big track's front straight-away and the same start finish line. It also doubled as the pit road for long events that required teams to make pit stops. The small track was removed in the early 1980s so that a straight pit lane could be built, and the infield pit area benefited by gaining some space. Racers, fans and sponsors have regarded Cayuga Speedway as Canada's premier racing and entertainment facility.

Set on 300 acres (120 hectares) of land, Cayuga offers campgrounds with electricity, concession booths, and free parking.

In 2002, track owners Bob and Leone Slack were inducted to the Canadian Motorsport Hall of Fame for their dedication to the Speedway.

=== Major events ===
The track has held a variety of different racing groups including the American Speed Association, CASCAR, NASCAR Pinty's Series, the American Canadian Tour, NASCAR Busch North, Hooters Pro-Cup, USAC, International Supermodified Association (ISMA), DIRT Modifieds and the ARCA Menards Series (formerly the ARCA Re/Max Series, which is considered to be one of the developmental milestones to the NASCAR Cup Series).

On June 8, 2006, a group of developers from Toronto purchased the 5/8-mile track from Bob and Leone Slack and made improvements for the 2007 season, hoping to attract NASCAR Nationwide Series (formerly called the Busch Series, currently the Xfinity Series) to have a race at Cayuga Speedway. Instead, the race went to Montreal (Circuit Gilles Villeneuve) due to its larger population and recognition in the international community. Cooper Construction of Oakville was announced as the vendor to re-build the track. Cayuga International Speedway Park hosted the first NASCAR Canadian Tire Series (Now the Pinty's Series) race in series history on May 26, 2007.

Jukasa continues to grow substantially in size every year. For the Canadian Short Track Nationals (CSTN) the payout for the drivers has continued to increase; in 2019 the total purse was $300,000, in 2020 the purse was $500,000 and the plans are set in motion to have the purse for 2021 to be $1 million.

Alex Nagy in 2017 was asked to be the general manager at the newly rebuilt Jukasa Motor Speedway, and still occupies this title in the year 2021. Previous to this position Nagy used to be a driver himself, was part of the crew for Alex Tagliani in IndyCar racing, and a series director of NASCAR Canada and it is because of these many accomplishments that Nagy has been inducted into the Canadian Motorsport Hall of Fame.

Co-owner of Jukasa Speedway and Six Nations businessman Ken Hill died on January 18, 2021, in Miami Florida and the suspected cause of death was a heart attack.

=== Closure ===
In the late 1990s former racers Brad Litchy and Garry Evans had gained ownership to the speedway, and the two new owners had hopes of bringing larger events to Cayuga. In the mid-2000s the track had not been attracting as many fans as it previously in what has been described as the "golden years" of the Cayuga Speedway (1970s). Due to this a group of investors had the idea of upgrading the facilities in order to attract the NASCAR Nationwide Series (now referred to as Xfinity); however this event was given to the Circuit Gilles Villeneuve. Since Cayuga was not given the Nationwide event they had to settle for the Canadian Tire series. The final NASCAR Canadian Tire Series race to be held here was the 2008 Coke Zero 200.

The last race held at the speedway was in July 2009 featuring the ISMA Supermodifieds; which was won by Mark Sammut of London, Ontario. This event would earn Sammut his first ISMA win. Along with the ISMA Supermodified racing action were the Canadian Vintage Modifieds; which was won by Phil Shaw of Orangeville, Ontario and followed by Steve Trendell. July 2009 Cayuga Speedway was closed and the future of the track was marked as unknown.

=== Reopening ===
In March 2014, photos surfaced on the Lost Speedway's Facebook page showing the speedway in a state of severe disrepair. In May 2014, the track was sold to local businessmen Ken Hill and Jerry Montour of the Six Nations of the Grand River. By September 2014, sand blasting had started on the walls to take off old paint, and in November 2014 the old asphalt was being removed. New paving started in November 2016, after new walls had been poured. Plans for the track were for the same size, but with progressive banking in the corners.

It was announced in December 2016 that the track would reopen on August 26 and 27, 2017. Renamed Jukasa Motor Speedway, the APC United Late Model Series headlined its reopening weekend.

Since 2017 Jukasa Motor Speedway has hosted the season finale for the NASCAR Pinty's Series known as the Pinty's Fall Brawl 200

The track received fresh asphalt and a redesign that now features turns up to 8.5 degrees, with the previous flat straightaways now showing 3.5 degrees in banking and a racing surface that is 60 feet (18.28m) wide. The track also features over 1000 campsites for fans.

Jukasa plans to replace the current grandstands, raise the main tower following the grandstand and install a spectator crossover bridge to the infield to improve the track even further. Jukasa continues to gain more attention and due to this many people within the racing industry are beginning to look at this track as potential to host one of NASCAR's top three national series in the future.

=== Music ===
Concerts have been held occasionally at Cayuga Speedway; usually conforming with either the country or the heavy metal genre. Rock bands such as The Sheepdogs and the Georgia Satellites have performed at the speedway the night before major racing events.

=== Closure ===
Jukasa Motor Speedway permanently closed its doors for auto racing in November 2021.
