= Stock car racing =

Form of automobile racing

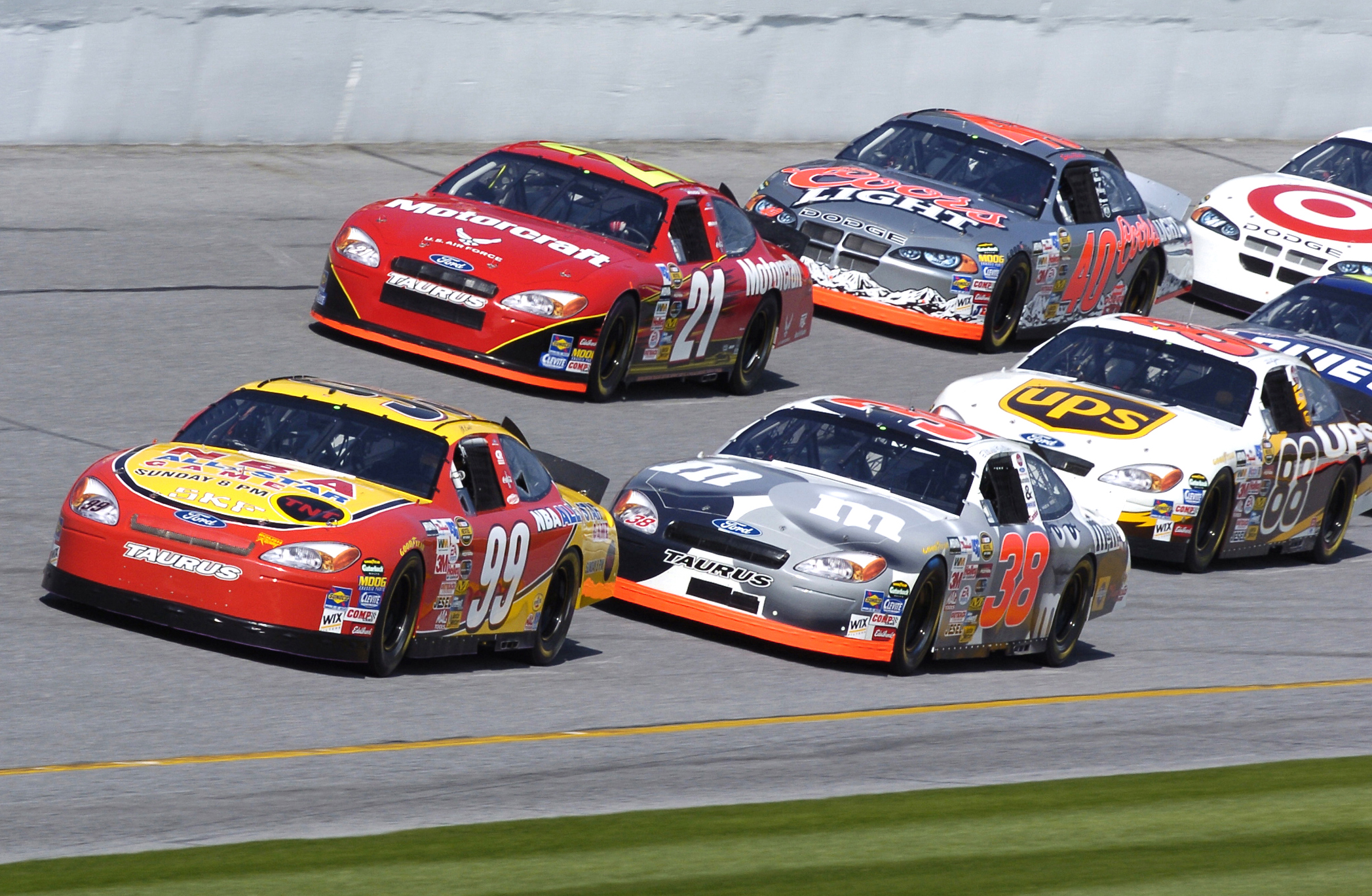
- NASCAR cars practicing at Daytona International Speedway with Jeff Burton, Elliott Sadler, Ricky Rudd, Dale Jarrett, and Sterling Marlin in 2004
- Highest governing body: NASCAR

Characteristics
- Contact: Yes
- Team members: Yes
- Type: Outdoor
- Venue: All types of oval tracks and road courses

Stock car racing is a form of automobile racing run on oval tracks and road courses. It originally used production-model cars, hence the name "stock car", but is now run using cars specifically built for racing. Originating in the southern United States, its largest governing body is NASCAR, whose NASCAR Cup Series is the premier top-level series of professional stock car racing. Canada, Mexico, Brazil, Argentina, and Chile also have forms of stock car racing in the Americas, some of which NASCAR has operations in. Other countries, such as Australia, New Zealand and the United Kingdom, have forms of stock car racing worldwide as well. Top-level stock cars exceed 200 mph (322 km/h) at speedway tracks and on superspeedway tracks such as Daytona International Speedway and Talladega Superspeedway. Contemporary NASCAR-spec top-level cars produce maximum power outputs of 860–900 hp from their naturally aspirated V8 engines. In October 2007 American race car driver Russ Wicks set a speed record for stock cars in a 2007-season Dodge Charger built to NASCAR specifications by achieving a maximum speed of 244.9 mph (394.1 km/h) at Bonneville Speedway. For the 2015 NASCAR Cup Series, power output of the competing cars ranged from 750 to 800 hp (560 to 600 kW).

== History ==
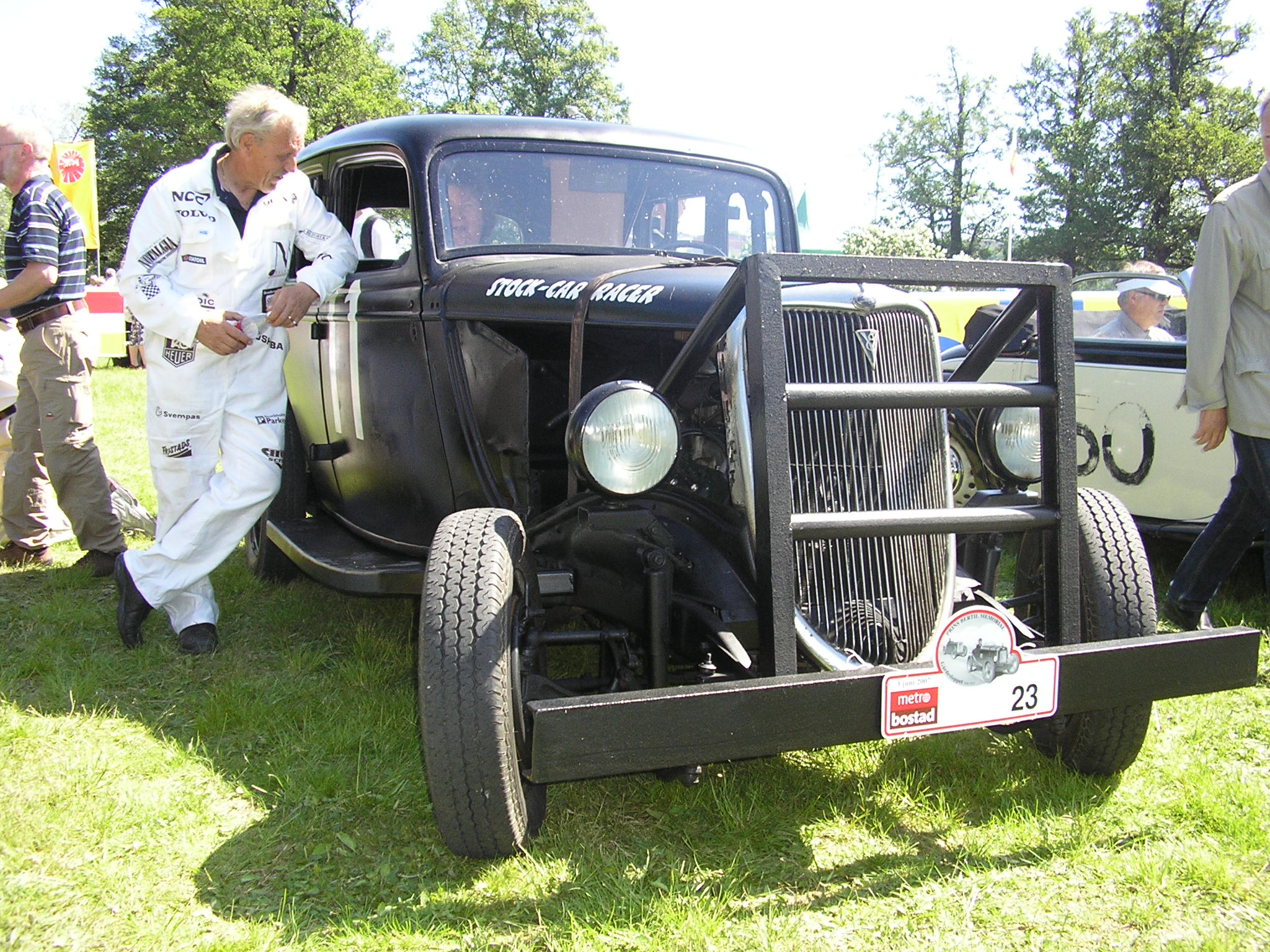
1934 Ford stock car racer with reinforcement in the front

=== Early years ===
In the 1920s, moonshine runners during the Prohibition era would often have to outrun the authorities. To do so, they had to upgrade their vehicles—while leaving them looking ordinary, so as not to attract attention. Eventually, runners started getting together with fellow runners and making runs together. They would challenge one another and eventually progressed to organized events in the early 1930s. The main problem racing faced was the lack of a unified set of rules among the different tracks. When Bill France Sr. saw this problem, he set up a meeting at the Streamline Hotel in order to form an organization that would unify the rules.

When NASCAR was first formed by France in 1948 to regulate stock car racing in the U.S., there was a requirement that any car entered be made entirely of parts available to the general public through automobile dealers. Furthermore, the car models were required to have sold over 500 units to the public. This is referred to as "homologation", which other racing series has since adapted for their own rulesets. In NASCAR's early years, the cars were so "stock" that it was commonplace for the drivers to drive themselves to the competitions in the car that they were going to run in the race. While automobile engine technology had remained fairly stagnant in World War II, advanced aircraft piston engine development had provided a great deal of available data, and NASCAR was formed just as some of the improved technology was about to become available in production cars. Until the advent of the Trans-Am Series in 1967, NASCAR homologation cars were the closest thing that the public could buy that was actually very similar to the cars that were winning national races.

The 1949 Oldsmobile Rocket V-8 with a displacement of 303 cu in (5.0 L) is widely recognized as the first postwar modern overhead valve (OHV) engine to become available to the public. The Oldsmobile was an immediate success in 1949 and 1950, and all the automobile manufacturers could not help noticing the higher sales of the Oldsmobile 88 to the buying public. The motto of the day became "win on Sunday, sell on Monday." However, in spite of the fact that several competing engines were more advanced, the aerodynamic and low-slung Hudson Hornet managed to win in 1951, 1952, and 1953 with a 308 cu in (5.0 L) inline six-cylinder that used an old-style flathead engine, proving there was more to winning than just a more powerful engine.

At the time, it typically took three years for a new design of car body or engine to end up in production and be available for NASCAR racing. Most cars sold to the public did not have a wide variety of engine choices, and the majority of the buying public at the time was not interested in the large displacement special edition engine options that would soon become popular. However, the end of the Korean War in 1953 started an economic boom, and then car buyers immediately began demanding more powerful engines.

Also in 1953, NASCAR recommended that the drivers add roll bars, but did not require them.

In 1957, several notable events happened. The Automobile Manufacturers Association banned manufacturers from using race wins in their advertising and giving direct support to race teams, as they felt it led to reckless street racing.

=== Heyday ===
The desire from fans and manufacturers alike for higher performance cars within the restrictions of homologation meant that carmakers began producing limited production "special edition" cars based on high production base models. It also became apparent that manufacturers were willing to produce increasingly larger engines to remain competitive (Ford had developed a 483 they hoped to race). For the 1963 season NASCAR engines were restricted to using a maximum displacement of 7.0 liters (427 cu.in.) and using only two valves per cylinder.

Also, even with heavy duty special editions sold to the public for homologation purposes, the race car rules were further modified, primarily in the interest of safety. This is because race drivers and their cars during this era were subjected to forces unheard of in street use, and require a far higher level of protection than is normally afforded by truly "stock" automobile bodies.

In 1963 Ford sold enough of their aerodynamic "sport-roof" edition Galaxies to the public so it would qualify as stock, and with the heavy-duty FE block bored and stroked to the new limit of 427, the top five finishers were all Fords. Chrysler had bored their 413 to create the "Max Wedge" 426, but it still could not compete with the Fords. General Motors' headquarters had genuinely tried to adhere to the 1957 ban, but their Chevrolet division had also constantly tried to work around it, because the other manufacturers had openly circumvented the ban. In 1963 GM gave in and openly abandoned compliance, and Chevrolet was allowed to produce the ZO6 427, but it did not immediately enjoy success.

In 1965 Ford adapted two single-overhead-cams to their FE 427 V8 to allow it to run at a higher RPM (called the Ford 427 Cammer). Ford started to sell "cammers" to the public to homologate it (mostly to dealer-sponsored privateer drag racers), but NASCAR changed the rules to specify that all NASCAR engines must use a single cam-in-block. But even without the cammer, the Ford FE 427 won in 1965.

In 1966 Chrysler sold enough of the 426 Hemis to make it available again, and they put it in their new Dodge Charger which had a low-drag rear window that was radically sloped. It was called a "fast-back", and because of this David Pearson was the series champion that year with Richard Petty dominating 1967, winning 27 of 48 races (including 10 in a row) in the boxier Plymouth Belvedere.

The 1969 season featured the Torino Cobra or Torino "Talladega" which had enough aerodynamic body improvements that it gave it a higher speed than the 1968 Torino, with no other changes. The Cobra, featuring extended nose and reshaped rockers, was renamed Talladega part way through the 1969 season when the Boss 429 replaced the 427. Starting in 1963 up till this point, Ford had won six straight Manufacturer Championships, and by the end of the 1969 season Ford would make it seven in a row. Richard Petty was tired of winning races but losing the championship, so after a private viewing of Ford's new Talladega and Boss 429 engine, he signed a lucrative deal with Ford.

Prior to its first race at the Daytona 500, David Pearson's 427 powered Ford Torino Cobra set a new NASCAR record by being the first to exceed 190 mph (310 km/h) when he qualified at 190.029 mph (305.822 km/h). When the race started Donnie Allison's Torino lead the majority of the race (84 laps). Towards the end of the race the Torino of LeeRoy Yarbrough chased down the Dodge of Charlie Glotzbach, who had an 11-second lead. It was the first Daytona 500 won on a last lap pass. Things got worse for Dodge when NASCAR, a few months later, finally allowed Ford to run its hemi-headed Boss 429 engine.

With Ford winning the majority of the races, Dodge was forced to develop a better car of their own. Using the Charger 500 as a basis, they added a pointed nose. This nose was almost a carbon copy of the nose on the 1962 Ford Mustang I prototype. This radical body shape required a wing to remain stable at speeds over 180 mph (290 km/h). They named it the Dodge Daytona after the race they hoped to win. Even though it never won a Daytona 500 race, it was still a significant improvement over its predecessor the Dodge Charger 500.

NASCAR feared that these increasing speeds significantly surpassed the abilities of the tire technology of the day, and it would undoubtedly increase the number of gruesome wrecks that were occurring. As a result, the 1970 Homologation rules were changed so that one car for every two U.S. dealers had to be built for sale to the public to qualify, hoping to delay the use of aero-bodies until tires could improve.

For the 1970 season Dodge raced the 1969 model Daytona, but Plymouth managed to build over 1,920 Plymouth Superbirds, which were similarly equipped to the Daytona. Petty came back to Plymouth in the plus 200 mph (320 km/h) Superbird, and Bobby Isaac won the season championship in a Daytona. NASCAR restricted all "aero-cars" including the Ford Talladega, Mercury Spoiler II, Charger 500, Dodge Daytona and Plymouth Superbird to a maximum engine displacement of 305 cu in (5.0 L) for 1971. Almost all teams switched to non-aero bodystyles. NASCAR eventually adopted a restrictor plate to limit top speeds for the 7.0L engine as teams switched to small-block 358 cu in (5.9 L) engines.

NASCAR edited the rules in a way that they hoped would make the cars safer and more equal, so the race series would be more a test of the drivers, rather than a test of car technology.

In 1972, R.J. Reynolds (the tobacco conglomerate) took over as the major sponsor of NASCAR racing (changing the name to the "Winston Cup") and they made a significantly larger financial contribution than previous sponsors. Richard Petty's personal sponsorship with STP also set new, higher standards for financial rewards to driving teams. The sudden infusion of noticeably larger amounts of money changed the entire nature of the sport.

The 1973 oil crisis meant that large displacement special edition homologation cars of all makes were suddenly sitting unsold. Through the balance of the 1970s until 1991, the factory stock sheetmetal over a racing frame meant the cars looked very much like their street version counterparts. It can be said that 1992, with the addition of grounded type spoilers and sleeker shape, marked the beginning for non-stock sheetmetal and from that point forward, stock cars were quickly allowed to differ greatly from anything available to the public. Modern racing "stock" cars are stock in name only, using a body template that is vaguely modeled after currently available automobiles. The chassis, running gear, and other equipment have almost nothing to do with anything in ordinary automobiles. NASCAR and the auto manufacturers have become aware of this with the Cup Series' Gen 4 car (1992-2007) and Car of Tomorrow (2007-2012), and for 2013 each brand (Chevrolet, Dodge, Ford, and Toyota) have redesigned their racing sheetmetal to more resemble the street models of their cars.

== Types of cars ==
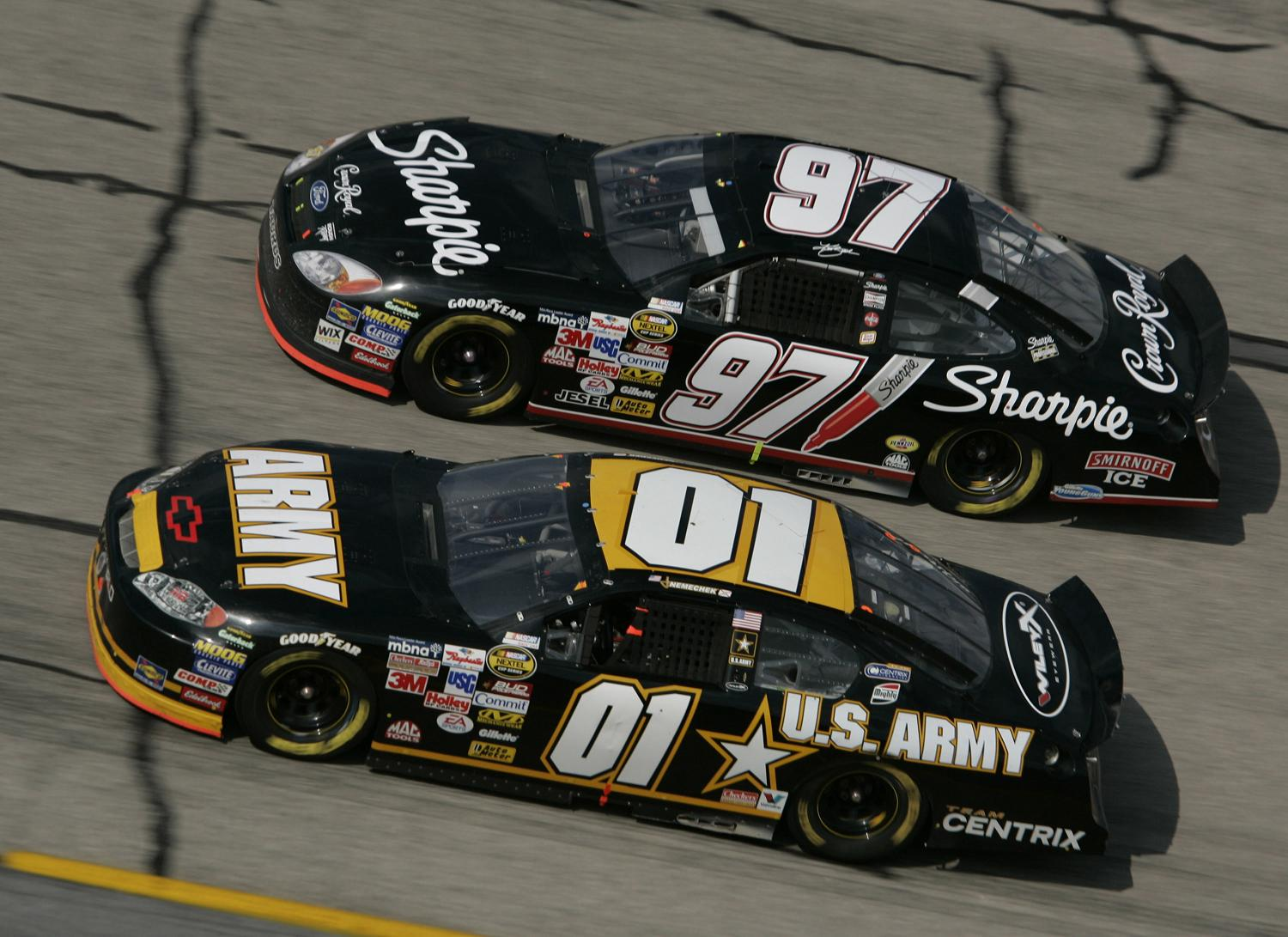
NASCAR Cup Series cars competing

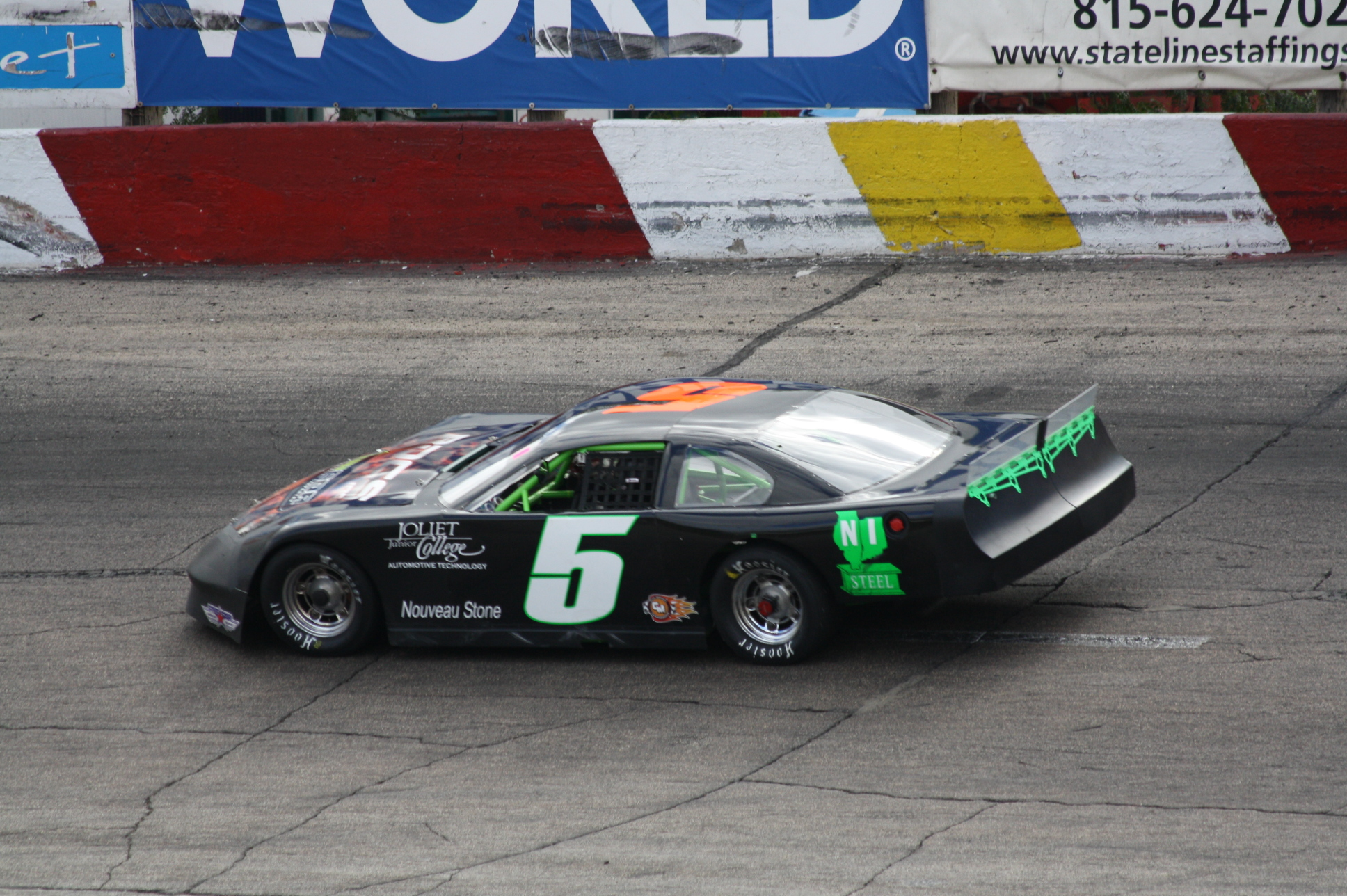
ASA Late Model Series car on an asphalt track

A stock car, in the original sense of the term, is an automobile that has not been modified from its original factory configuration. Later the term stock car came to mean any production-based automobile used in racing. This term is used to differentiate such a car from a "race car", a special, custom-built car designed only for racing purposes.

The degree to which the cars conform to standard model specs has changed over the years and varies from country to country. Today most American stock cars may superficially resemble standard American family sedans but are in fact silhouette cars: purpose-built racing machines built to a strict set of regulations governing the car design ensuring that the chassis, suspension, engine, etc. are architecturally identical to those in stock production vehicles. For example, NASCAR Cup Series race vehicles now require fuel injection. In the UK and New Zealand there is a racing formula called stock cars, but the cars are markedly different from any road car. In Australia there was a formula that was quite similar to NASCAR called AUSCAR.

The Racecar-Euro Series began in 2009 and was sanctioned by NASCAR as a touring series in 2012, currently operating as the NASCAR Whelen Euro Series.

=== Street stock and pure stock ===
"True" stock car racing, which consists of only street vehicles that can be bought by the general public, is sometimes now called "street stock", "pure stock", "hobby stock", "showroom stock", or "U-car" racing. In 1972, SCCA started its first showroom stock racing series, with a price ceiling on the cars of $3,000. Some modern showroom stock racing allows safety modifications done on showroom stock cars.

Super stock classes are similar to street stock, but allow for more modifications to the engine. Power output is usually in the range of 500–550 horsepower (373–410 kilowatts). Tire width is usually limited to 8 in (200 mm).

Some entry level classes are called "street stock", and are similar to what is often called "banger racing" in England.

=== Modifieds ===
Modified stock cars resemble a hybrid of open wheel cars and stock cars. The rear wheels are covered by fenders but the front wheels and engine are left exposed. First popular in the United States after World War II, this type of racing was early-on characterized by its participants' modification of passenger cars in pursuit of higher speeds, hence the name. In many regions, particularly on the east coast, modified racing is considered the highest class of stock cars in local racing.

NASCAR officially sanctions the NASCAR Whelen Modified Tour which is the oldest racing series sanctioned by NASCAR. The SMART Modified Tour, at one point was the NASCAR Whelen Southern Modified Tour, is another prominent modified tour.

=== Late models ===
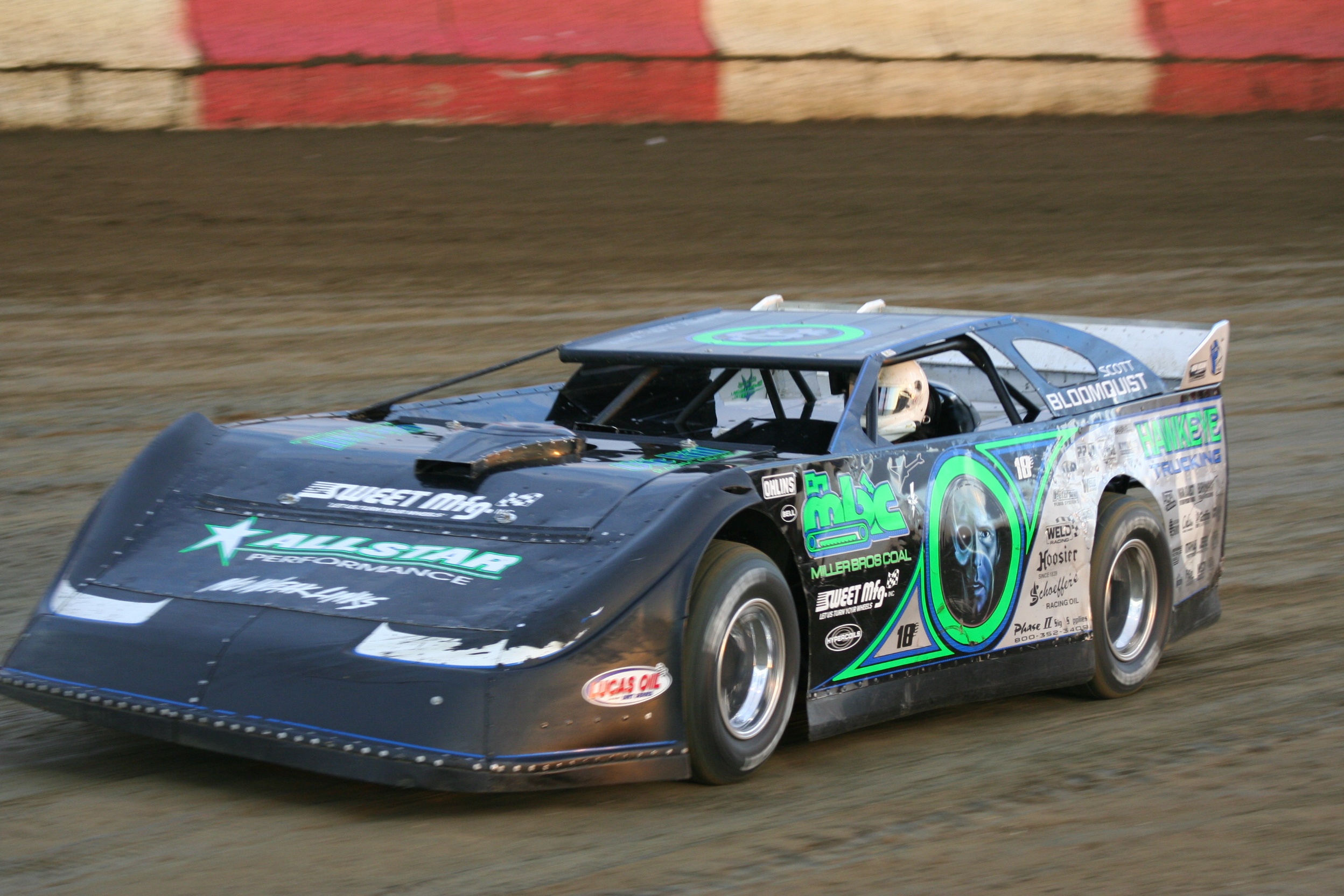
A late model car on a dirt track

In many areas of the country late models are usually the highest class of stock cars in local racing. Rules for construction of a late model car vary from region to region and even race track to race track. The most common variations (on paved tracks) include super late models (SLMs), pro Late models (PLMs), late model stock cars (LMSCs), and limited late models (LLMs). A late model may be a custom built machine, or a heavily modified streetcar. Individual sanctioning bodies (like NASCAR, ACT, PASS, UARA, ASA, CARS Tour, etc.) maintain their own late model rule books, and even individual racetracks can maintain their own rule books, meaning a late model that is legal in one series or at one track may not be legal at another without modifications. The national touring series, the NASCAR Late Model Sportsman Series, originated from local late model races in the east coast of the U.S. This division was later called the "Busch Series", the "Nationwide Series", "Xfinity Series" and currently the "O'Reilly Auto Parts Series" as its title sponsor changed.

Late model racing has a large following throughout the country, with many of the biggest model races having large purses, some equivalent to some NASCAR Truck and O'Reilly Auto Parts Series races. These races have attracted drivers from all over the country including Cup, O'Reilly Auto Parts, and Truck drivers. Despite NASCAR officially sanctioning the NASCAR Advance Auto Parts Weekly Series as a national championship, series such as the CARS Tour, ASA, UARA, and the ACT draw the biggest attention and sanction most of the biggest races in the country.

== United States ==
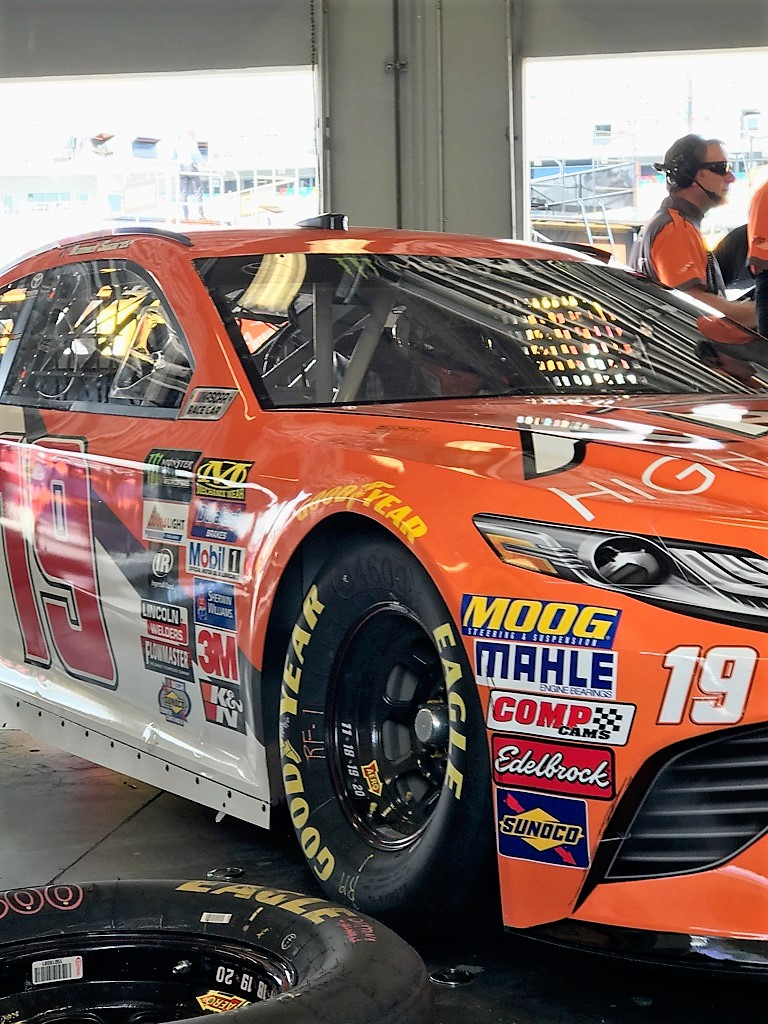
Daniel Suárez's 2018 Toyota Camry in the garage at Daytona International Speedway

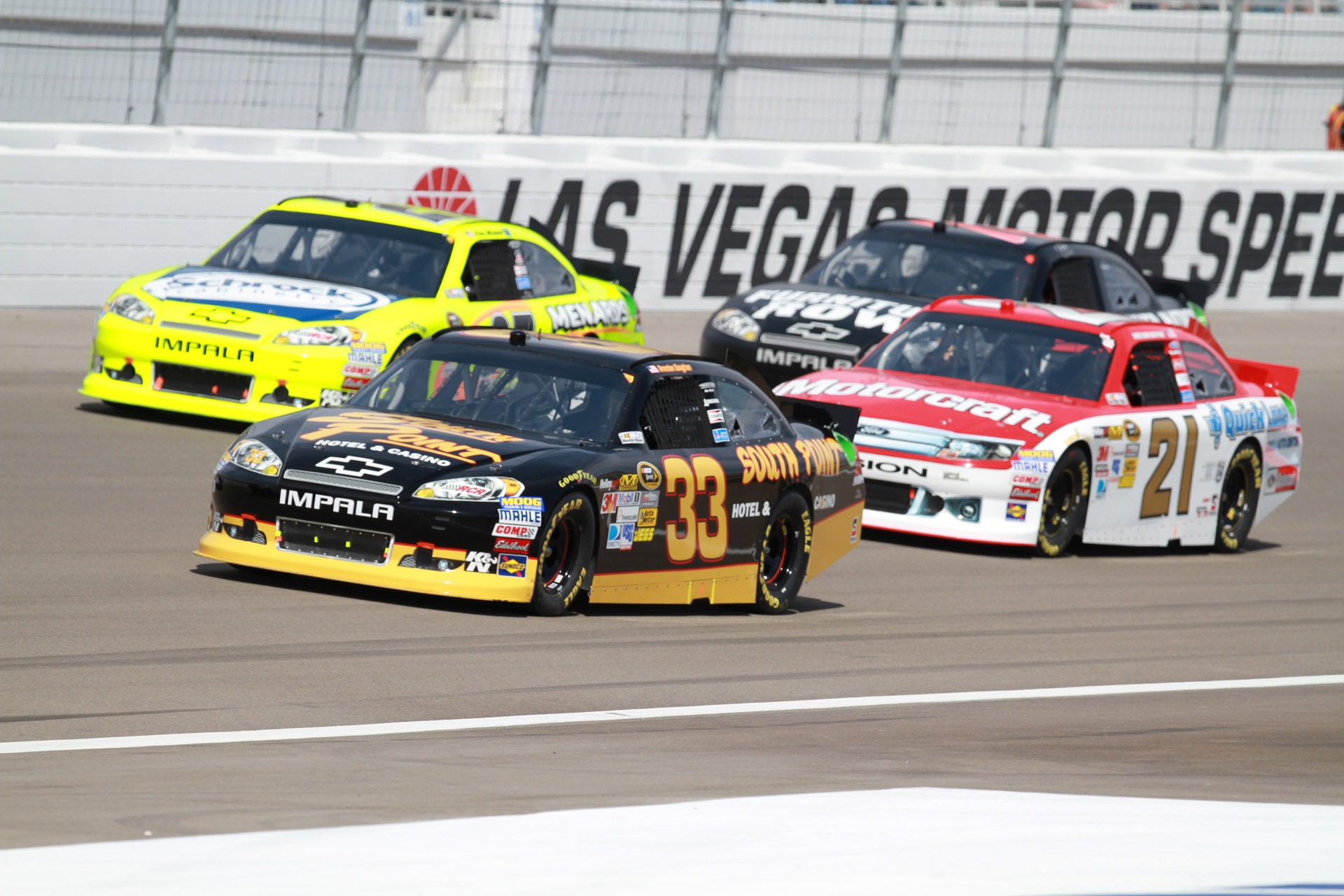
NASCAR stock cars at Las Vegas Motor Speedway in 2012

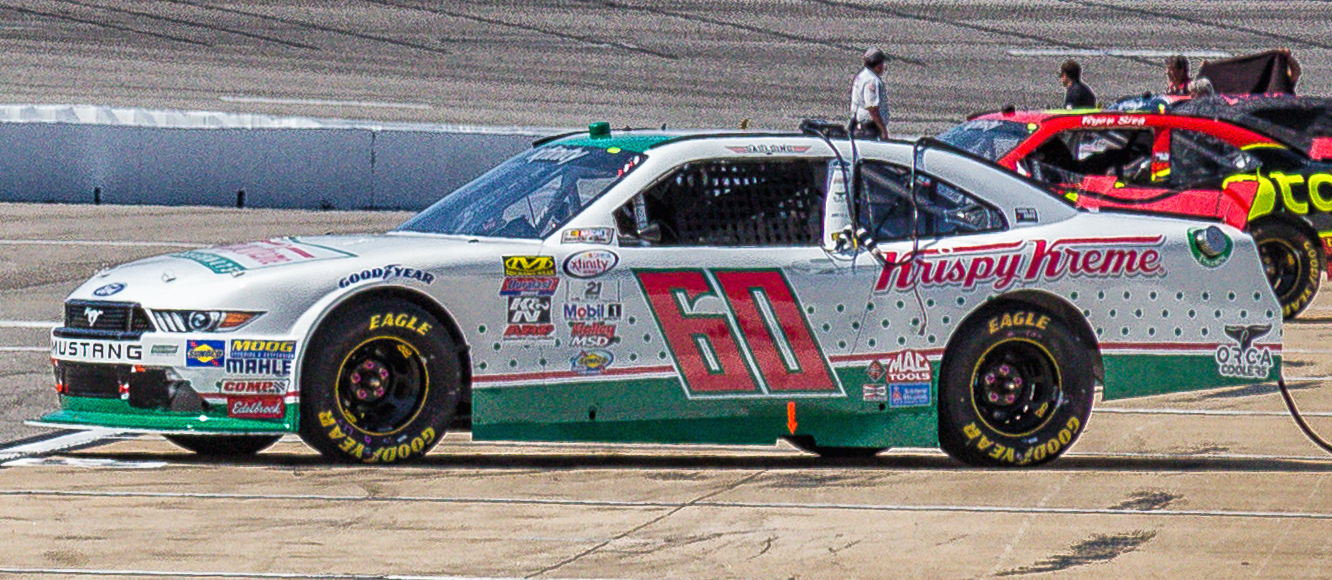
Gray Gaulding's Ford Mustang

=== NASCAR ===
NASCAR is currently the largest stock car racing governing body in the world. While NASCAR sanctions multiple series, it has three national championship touring series that are commonly referred to as the "top 3" series. In addition to the top three series, NASCAR also sanctions many regional and local series. NASCAR also sanctions three international series that race in Canada, Mexico, and Europe.

==== NASCAR Cup Series ====
The most prominent championship in stock car racing is the NASCAR Cup Series. It is the most popular racing series in the United States, drawing over 6 million spectators in 1997, an average live audience of over 190,000 people for each race.

The most famous event in the series is the Daytona 500, an annual 500-mile (800 km) race at the Daytona International Speedway. The series' second-biggest event is arguably The Brickyard 400, an annual 400-mile (640 km) race held at the Indianapolis Motor Speedway, the legendary home of the Indianapolis 500, an open-wheeled race. However, the event was excluded from the 2021 schedule in favor of a race on the track's road course. Together the Cup Series and O'Reilly Auto Parts Series drew 8 million spectators in 1997, compared to 4 million for both American open-wheel series (CART and IRL), which merged in 2008 under the IRL banner. In 2002, 17 of the 20 US top sporting events in terms of attendance were stock car races. Only football drew more television viewers that year.

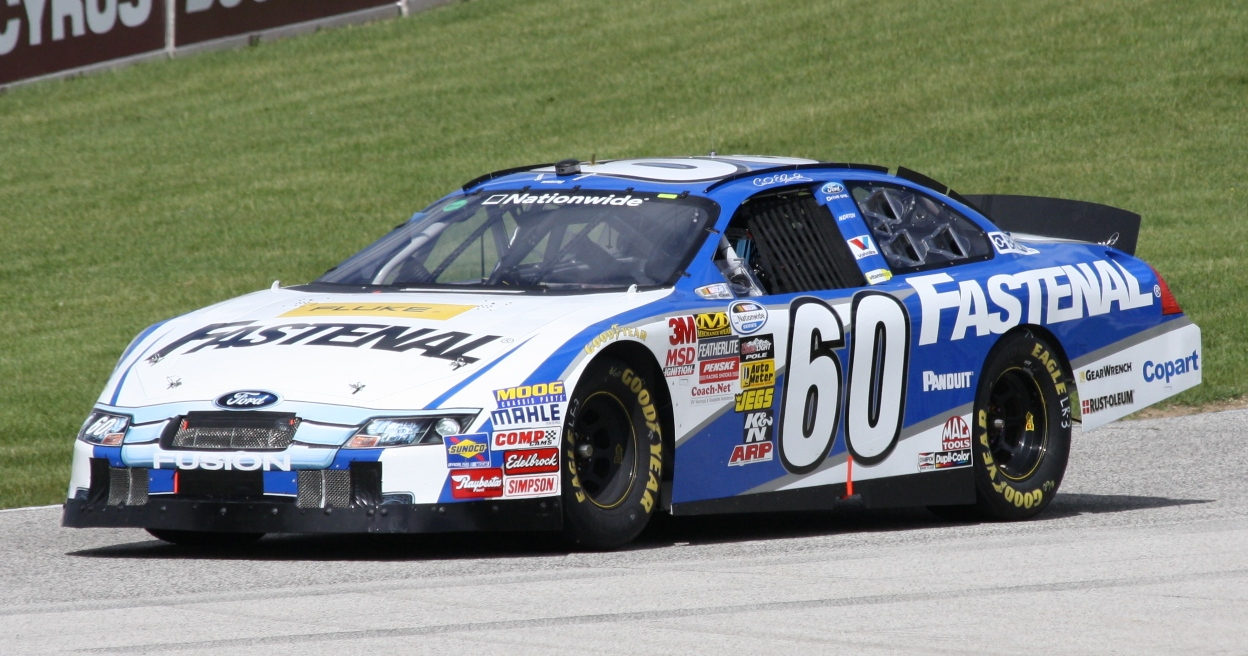
Carl Edwards at Road America in 2010

==== NASCAR O'Reilly Auto Parts Series ====
The NASCAR O'Reilly Auto Parts Series is the second national series in the United States. It serves as the primary feeder series to the Cup Series, similar to Formula Two for Formula One, and Indy NXT for Indy Car. Races are commonly held as a support race to Cup Series events. Many current Cup Series drivers formerly competed in the Series before moving on to competing full-time in the Cup Series.

The O'Reilly Auto Parts series typically features multiple Cup Series competitors competing alongside full time O'Reilly Auto Parts drivers. There was some controversy as Cup Series drivers tended to be more successful than full-time O'Reilly Auto Parts drivers. Cup drivers are not eligible to score points in the O'Reilly Auto Parts series, and are limited to the number of races they are allowed to race in the Series.

==== NASCAR Craftsman Truck Series ====
Starting in 1995, the NASCAR Truck Series is the third highest ranking stock car series in the United States. The series was the brainchild of then-NASCAR West Coast executive Ken Clapp, who was inspired by off-road truck racing. Unlike the other two national touring NASCAR series, the Truck Series race pickup truck styled bodies, though it is still considered a stock car series because of its similarity. Much like the O'Reilly Auto Parts Series, the Truck Series often features Cup Series drivers competing for parts of the season.

=== ARCA ===
The Automobile Racing Club of America was founded in 1953 as a Midwest regional series. In addition to the ARCA Menards Series, it formerly sanctioned the ARCA Midwest Tour, and the ARCA Lincoln Welders Truck Series from 1999 to 2016.

NASCAR purchased ARCA in early 2018. For the 2020 season, the NASCAR K&N Series East and West were rebranded under the ARCA banner as the ARCA Menards Series East and ARCA Menards Series West.

=== Other series ===
Outside of NASCAR, there are a number of other national or regional stock-car sanctioning bodies in the United States. There are many organizations that cater to these local short tracks. The American Speed Association (ASA), Champion Racing Association (CRA), International Motor Contest Association (IMCA), United Auto Racing Association (UARA), Championship Auto Racing Series (CARS), American Canadian Tour (ACT), SMART Modified Tour, StockCar Racing League and the Pro All Star Series (PASS) are the most prominent sanctioning bodies. Many Cup, O'Reilly Auto Parts, Truck, and ARCA Series drivers, especially recently, have raced in these series and many still do after reaching the highest level. The International Race of Champions (IROC) and Superstar Racing Experience (SRX) are usually perceived as being outside of the regular stock car racing scene because of their all-star grids.

== New Zealand ==
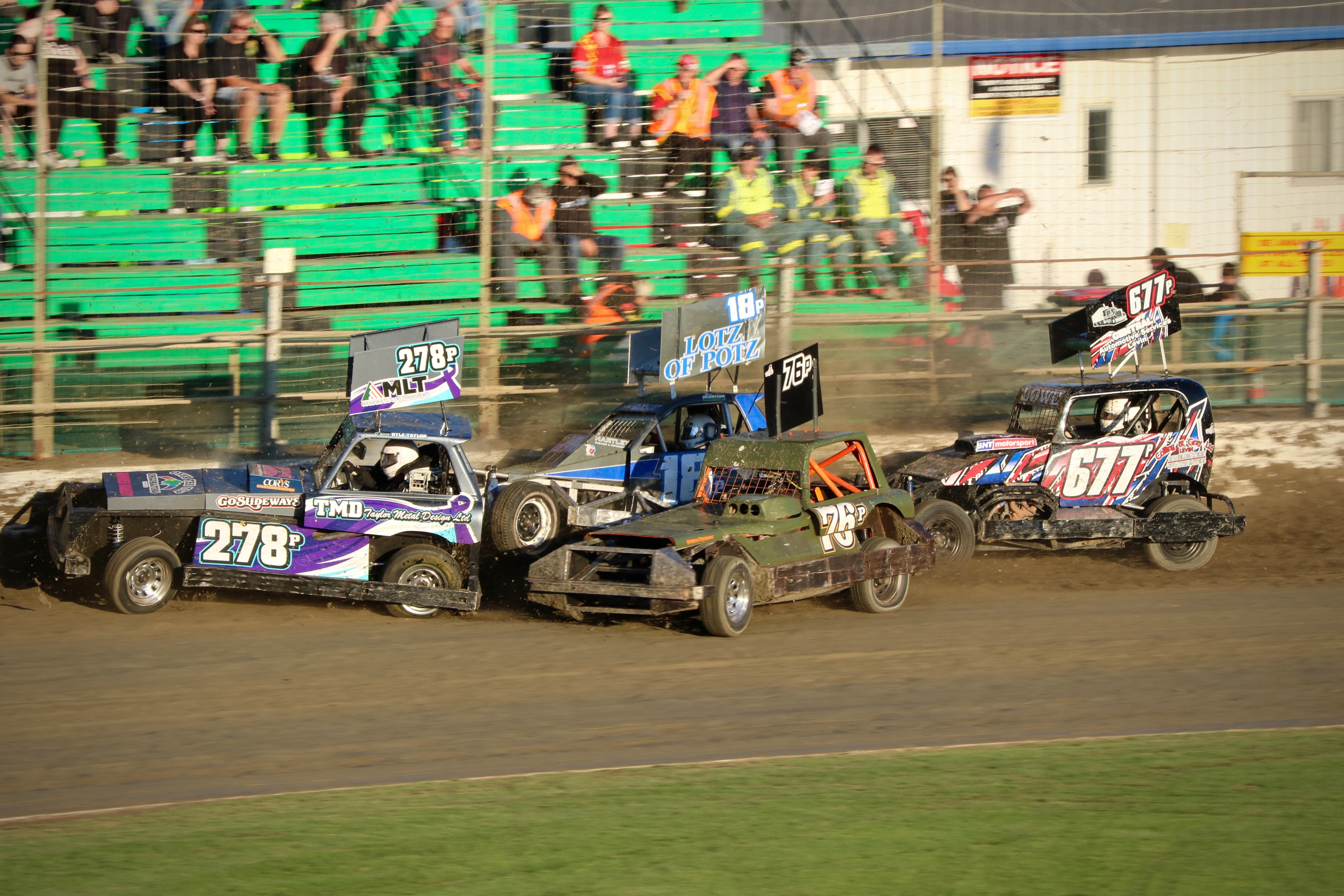
Superstocks racing

Cars are built to an extremely rigid design and feature strong steel guards around almost the entire car. "Stockcars" are divided into three classes: Superstocks, Stock cars, Ministocks (Ministocks predominantly being a non-contact youth class). Superstocks are the top class and are typically powered by V8 engines up to 4.1 litres (248 cu in) which can produce over 370 kilowatts (500 hp).

== Australia ==
Stock car racing in the NASCAR mould (AUSCAR) had a following in Australia during the mid-late 1980s and through the 1990s, but with the advent of the Supercars Championship, which took up the bulk of the competitors, sponsorship dollars on offer as well as major television time, the Australian Superspeedway series shut down after 2001.

== United Kingdom ==
The term 'stock cars' in the UK refers to a specialized form of racing that bears little resemblance to any road car.

== Canada ==
Stock Car Racing has existed in Canada as early as the 1950s in amateur format, although official structured competitions began with the foundation of CASCAR in 1981. The league went on for a few decades until 2006, when it was purchased by NASCAR and became the NASCAR Canada Series. Vehicle models used are typically from the makes of Chevrolet, Dodge, and Ford. The series runs a higher percentage of road and street courses compared to the top 4 NASCAR series in America. The competition has had a growing interest in the recent decades.

== Other regions ==
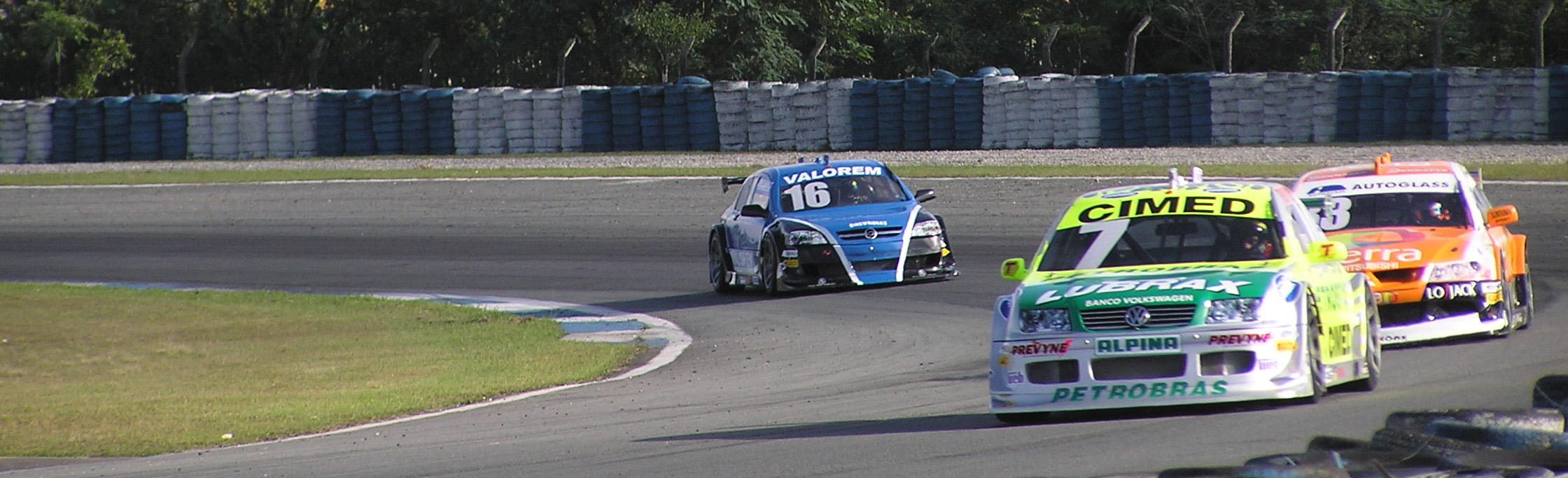
Brazilian stock car in 2006

Brazil currently hosts the BRB Stock Car Pro Series, with starting grids of 30 or more cars, two brands competing in Chevrolet and Toyota, and several support series. Despite the name, Brazilian stock car competitions are not held on oval tracks, therefore making them closer to touring car racing than standard stock car racing. The same can be said about Argentina's popular stock series, Turismo Carretera. Other efforts in hosting stock car series have been made in Australia, Chile, South Africa, and Japan as well.

== Tracks ==
Stock car races take place predominantly on oval tracks of 3 or 4 turns, with all turns to the left. Oval tracks are classified as short track (less than 1 mile), intermediate or speedway (1 to 2 miles) or superspeedway (over 2 miles). Road courses are any tracks having both left and right turns. Depending on the track, typical race speeds can vary from 90 miles per hour (140 km/h) at Martinsville to over 200 miles per hour (320 km/h) at Talladega. In 1987 Bill Elliott's 212.809 mph (342.483 km/h) qualifying time at Talladega brought about a change at superspeedways (Daytona and Talladega). Such high speeds and Bobby Allison's car going airborne into the catch-fence and injuring fans forced NASCAR to implement power-reducing measures, one of which was the mandated implement of below carburetor restrictor plates. This later became known as restrictor plate racing.

=== Tactics ===
In contrast with most forms of racing, minor car-to-car contact is generally accepted in stock car racing. This may happen in the form of forcing another vehicle out of the way, or pushing a competing vehicle forward for mutual benefit. Stock cars are generally built to be tolerant of superficial damage to bodywork, whereas open wheel designs can experience severe reductions in performance with even slight spoiler damage. On intermediate tracks and superspeedways, drafting is used to reduce the overall effect of drag. A driver accomplishes this by positioning the vehicle close to the one ahead of so as to benefit from the other's slipstream. Drafting was "discovered" by Junior Johnson during his winning performance at the 1960 Daytona 500.

== See also ==
- British Stock Car Association
- British Stock car racing
- CASCAR Super Series 1981–2006
- Days of Thunder (1990 film)
- Desafio Corona 2004–07; now NASCAR Mexico Series
- Hot rod
- Hot Rods (oval racing)
- OSCAAR
- Production car racing
- Speedcar Series
- Stroker Ace
- Talladega Nights: The Ballad of Ricky Bobby
