= Kerry Micks =

Canadian racing driver (born 1961)

- Born: January 10, 1961 (age 65); Mount Albert, Ontario, Canada

NASCAR Canada Series career
- 103 races run over 12 years
- Car no., team: No. 02 (Micks Motorsports)
- 2019 position: 32nd
- Best finish: 4th (2011)
- First race: 2007 Dodge Dealers 200 (Cayuga)
- Last race: 2019 Lucas Oil 250 (Saint-Eustache)
- First win: 2007 NAPA Autopro 100 (Montreal)
- Last win: 2008 Full Throttle Energy Drink 200 (Bowmanville (Oval))
Wins	Top tens	Poles
3	60	4
- Statistics up to date as of September 29, 2019.

Kerry Micks (born January 10, 1961) is a Canadian race car driver who competed in the NASCAR Pinty's Series.

== CASCAR Super Series ==
Micks and his wife Susan formed Micks Motorsports in 1992 to compete in the CASCAR Super Series. From 1990 to 2006, he drove in CASCAR, where is the all-time leader in starts with 165 and second in wins with 24 in the series. Micks won his first and only CASCAR Super Series Championship in 1993.

Micks was the first Canadian driver to race a Ford when Ford of Canada came on board for the CASCAR Super Series in 1995.

== NASCAR Canadian Tire Series ==
After NASCAR completed their buyout of CASCAR in 2007, Micks began to race in the NASCAR Canadian Tire Series. He has had three wins: Montreal and Trois-Rivières (2007); Mosport Park (2008) as well as four poles Barrie (2007); Montreal (2008), Autodrome St-Eustache (2010), Mosport Park (2013). In 2009, he had little success, but in 2010, things looked promising. However, he lost on the last lap to D. J. Kennington after winning the pole and leading most of the laps in July at Autodrome St-Eustache and had six top-fives finishing fourth in the final point standings.

In 2012, Micks stopped competing full-time on the Canadian Tire circuit, splitting the races with fellow veteran driver and 1994 CASCAR Champion Mark Dilley. Micks raced the road courses in the No. 02, while Dilley raced the oval circuits, other than one oval at Riverside International Speedway, entering the team's road course car renumbered as 56. Micks retired from the race after just 4 laps, giving him his only DNF on the season.

Micks continued his part-time schedule in 2013, racing six races for Micks Motorsports, while adding an additional two races in the No. 98 Ford owned by Canadian NASCAR pioneer Jim Bray. Micks did not finish four of his races entered in 2013, including both in Bray's cars. Micks substituted for Dilley at the oval at Canadian Tire Motorsport Park, surprising the field by winning the pole and leading 86 laps before dropping out with ignition failure.

For the third season in a row, Micks split 2014 driving duties with Mark Dilley. Micks again entered his road course car into two oval races, at Riverside and Barrie Speedway, this time numbered as the 9. Micks entered a Dodge at Barrie, making it one of the only times in Micks career he would race something other than a Ford.

== Motorsports career results ==
=== NASCAR ===
(key) (Bold – Pole position awarded by qualifying time. Italics – Pole position earned by points standings or practice time. * – Most laps led.)

==== Busch Series ====
NASCAR Busch Series results
Year	Team	No.	Make	1	2	3	4	5	6	7	8	9	10	11	12	13	14	15	16	17	18	19	20	21	22	23	24	25	26	NBGNC	Pts
1995	Info not available			DAY	CAR	RCH	ATL	NSV	DAR	BRI	HCY	NHA	NZH	CLT	DOV	MYB	GLN	MLW	TAL	SBO; DNQ	IRP	MCH	BRI	DAR	RCH	DOV	CLT	CAR	HOM	N/A	-

==== Pinty's Series ====
NASCAR Pinty's Series results
Year	Team	No.	Make	1	2	3	4	5	6	7	8	9	10	11	12	13	NPSC	Pts
2007	Micks Motorsports	02	Ford	HAM; 10	MSP; 21	BAR; 4	MPS; 4	EDM; 29	CGV; 1*	MSP; 3	CTR; 1*	HAM; 4	**BAR**; 19	RIS; 18	KWA; 14		7th	1696
2008	Micks Motorsports	02	Ford	HAM; 2	MSP; 21	BAR; 10	ASE; 3	MPS; 19	EDM; 8	**CGV**; 3	MSP; 1	CTR; 9	HAM; 13	BAR; 2	RIS; 23		5th	1828
2008	Micks Motorsports	02	Dodge													KWA; 21	5th	1828
2009	Micks Motorsports	02	Ford	ASE; 2	DEL; 4	MSP; 16	ASE; 6	MPS; 5	EDM; 19	SAS; 10	MSP; 7	CTR; 6	CGV; 3	BAR; 6	RIS; 7	KWA; 2	5th	1942
2010	Micks Motorsports	02	Ford	DEL; 9	MSP; 5	**ASE**; 6	TOR; 5	EDM; 5	MPS; 12	SAS; 7	CTR; 2	MSP; 3	CGV; 6	BAR; 14	RIS; 6	KWA; 2	5th	1977
2011	Micks Motorsports	02	Ford	MSP; 13	ICAR; 19	DEL; 6	MSP; 13	TOR; 4	MPS; 3	SAS; 4	CTR; 21	CGV; 2	BAR; 3	RIS; 5	KWA; 4		4th	1754
2012	Micks Motorsports	02	Ford	MSP; 7	ICAR; 21	MSP	DEL	MPS	EDM; 6	SAS	CTR; 12	CGV; 10	BAR				18th	190
2012	Micks Motorsports	56	Ford											RIS; 18	KWA		18th	190
2013	Micks Motorsports	02	Ford	MSP; 6	DEL	**MSP**; 19	ICAR; 7			ASE; 17	CTR; 27	RIS	MSP; 16	BAR	KWA		17th	220
2013	Jim Bray Racing	98	Ford					MPS; 21	SAS; 21								17th	220
2014	Micks Motorsports	02	Ford	MSP; 6	ACD	ICAR	EIR	SAS	ASE	CTR; 3		MSP; 14					16th	168
2014	Micks Motorsports	9	Ford								RIS; 16						16th	168
2014	Micks Motorsports	9	Dodge										BAR; 14	KWA			16th	168
2015	Micks Motorsports	02	Ford	MSP; 14	ACD	SSS	ICAR; 15	EIR	SAS	ASE	CTR; 16	RIS	MSP; 10	KWA			20th	121
2016	Micks Motorsports	02	Ford	MSP; 7	SSS		ICAR; 14	TOR; 5	EIR	SAS	CTR; 20	RIS	MSP; 9	ASE			12th	230
2016	Micks Motorsports	9	Ford			ACD; 16									KWA; 7		12th	230
2018	Micks Motorsports	02	Ford	MSP; 7	JUK; 18	ACD; 12	TOR; 17	SAS	SAS				MSP; 21	ASE; 4	NHA; 13	JUK	13th	243
2018	Eric Kerub	04	Dodge							EIR; 17	CTR	RIS					13th	243
2019	Micks Motorsports	02	Ford	MSP	JUK	ACD	TOR	SAS	SAS	EIR	CTR	RIS; 14	MSP	ASE; 8	NHA	JUK	32nd	66

^{*} Season still in progress
^{1} Ineligible for series points
