= Mark Dilley =

Canadian racing driver

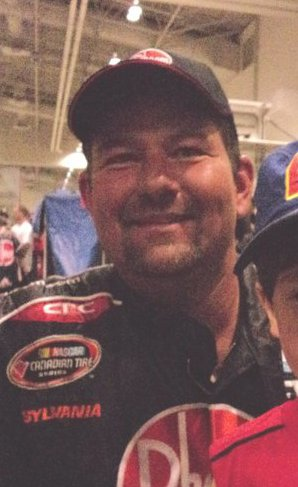
- Dilley in 2011
- Born: January 20, 1969 (age 57); Barrie, Ontario, Canada
- Height: 5"10
- Achievements: 1994 CASCAR Super Series Champion

NASCAR Canada Series career
- 146 races run over 16 years
- Car no., team: No. 64 (Wight Motorsports)
- 2024 position: 34th
- Best finish: 6th (2008, 2011)
- First race: 2007 Dodge Dealers 200 (Cayuga)
- Last race: 2024 Leland Industries 250 (Sutherland)
- First win: 2007 Atlantic Dodge Dealers 300 (Riverside)
- Last win: 2011 Wild Wing 300 (Barrie)
Wins	Top tens	Poles
3	74	3
- Statistics up to date as of May 18, 2025.

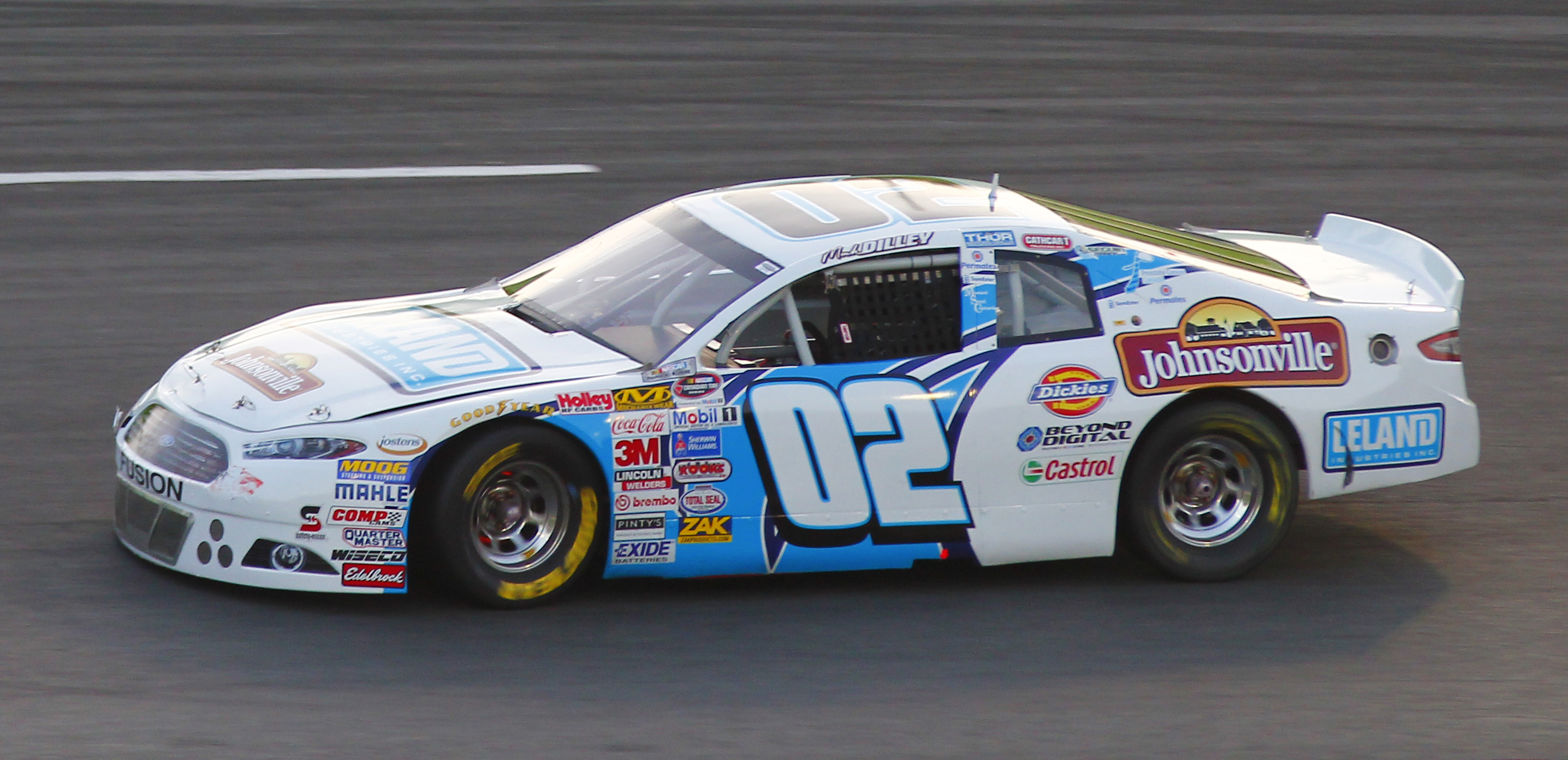
Mark Dilley - NASCAR Canadian Tire Series - Autodrome Chaudière - June 13th 2015 (photo Paul-Émile Poulin-Jacques)

Mark Dilley (born January 20, 1969) is a Canadian race car driver. He competes in the NASCAR Pinty's Series, driving the No. 64 Leland/BDI/PartSource Ford Fusion for Micks Motorsports. Dilley has been co-owner of Sauble Speedway since May 2017.

== Early career ==
Dilley drove in the CASCAR Super Series from 1990 until 2006 when the series was bought by NASCAR and rebranded as the Canadian Tire Series. Dilley won the CASCAR Super Series Championship in 1994.

== NASCAR Canadian Tire Series ==
Dilley began to race in the Canadian Tire Series in 2007 picking up sponsorship from Dodge, Wild Wing, and Leland Industries. He would go on to rack up one pole and four top-fives in the series inaugural season, including a win at Riverside International Speedway.

The 2008 season was more of the same for Dilley, adding six more top-fives and another win, this time at the 2008 Coke Zero 200 race. Dilley set a new career high, finishing 6th in series points. He spent one more season with Whitlock Motorsports before moving on to Farwell Racing. In his second season with Farwell, Dilley would pick up his third series win, leading just one lap at Barrie Speedway. It would be the only lap Dilley would lead all season.

In 2012, Dilley decided to run a limited schedule with his friend and 1993 CASCAR Super Series Kerry Micks in the No. 02 Ford for Micks Motorsports. Dilley, and oval expert, would race on the oval tracks, while Micks would take driving duties on the road courses. In 2019, Dilley returned for his first full-time season since 2011, driving the No. 64 for Micks Motorsports.

In 2024, Dilley started his retirement season with Ed Hakonson Racing (EHR) alongside Jason Hathaway.

=== Current life ===
Dilley currently lives in Barrie, Ontario. He was the main driver at Sunset Speedway. In 2017, he and a partner purchased Sauble Speedway (near Sauble Beach) and they were planning to attempt to get NASCAR sanctioning in 2018. According to Inside Track News, Dilley "has been involved as an owner, promoter and/or race director at the former Barrie Speedway and Sunset Speedway"; he was also the General Manager of Sunset for a time.

== Motorsports career results ==
=== NASCAR ===
(key) (Bold – Pole position awarded by qualifying time. Italics – Pole position earned by points standings or practice time. * – Most laps led.)

==== Canada Series ====
NASCAR Canada Series results
Year	Team	No.	Make	1	2	3	4	5	6	7	8	9	10	11	12	13	Rank	Points	Ref
2007	Whitlock Motorsports	9	Dodge	HAM; 2	MSP; 6	**BAR**; **2**	MPS; 15	EDM; 11	CGV; 21	MSP; 2	CTR; 19	HAM; 15	BAR; 13	RIS; 1	**KWA**; **12**		8th	1688	
2008	Whitlock Motorsports	9	Dodge	HAM; 3	MSP; 29	BAR; 8	ASE; 21	MPS; 4	EDM; 9	CGV; 7	MSP; 2	CTR; 20	HAM; 1*	BAR; 5	RIS; 4	KWA; 23	6th	1819	
2009	Whitlock Motorsports	9	Dodge	ASE; 5	**DEL**; **16**	MSP; 10	ASE; 20	MPS; 11	EDM; 8	SAS; 12	MSP; 15	CTR; 19	CGV; 5	BAR; 2	RIS; 3	KWA; 12	9th	1767	
2010	Farwell Racing Inc	9	Dodge	DEL; 12	MSP; 9	ASE; 10	TOR; 24	EDM; 16	MPS; 4	SAS; 8	CTR; 10	MSP; 7	CGV; 31	BAR; 12	RIS; 8	KWA; 4	8th	1701	
2011	Farwell Racing Inc	9	Dodge	MSP; 18	ICAR; 5	DEL; 11	MSP; 20	TOR; 6	MPS; 5	SAS; 5	CTR; 19	CGV; 23	BAR; 1	RIS; 10	KWA; 5		6th	1631	
2012	Micks Motorsports	02	Ford	MSP	ICAR	MSP; 2	DEL; 7	MPS; 13	EDM	SAS; 2	CTR	CGV	BAR; 20	RIS; 3	KWA; 7		13th	255	
2013	Micks Motorsports	02	Ford	MSP	DEL; 22	MSP	ICAR	MPS; 4	SAS; 2	ASE	CTR	RIS; 4	MSP	BAR; 8	KWA; 8		18th	218	
2014	Micks Motorsports	02	Ford	MSP	ACD; 2	ICAR; 19	EIR; 19	SAS; 14	ASE; 7	CTR	RIS; 5	MSP	BAR; 12	KWA; 4			10th	271	
2015	Micks Motorsports	02	Ford	MSP	ACD; 17	SSS; 17	ICAR	EIR; 14	SAS; 4	ASE; 2	CTR	RIS; 4	MSP	KWA			12th	239	
2016	Micks Motorsports	02	Ford	MSP	SSS; 14	ACD; 5	ICAR	TOR	EIR; 5	SAS; 10	CTR	RIS; 7	MSP	ASE; 3	KWA; 6		11th	261	
2017	Micks Motorsports	02	Ford	MSP	DEL; 15	ACD; 13	ICAR	TOR	SAS; 11	SAS; 8	EIR; 7	CTR	RIS; 4	MSP	ASE; 9	JUK; 18	13th	269	
2018	Micks Motorsports	02	Ford	MSP	JUK	ACD	TOR	SAS; 7	SAS; 8	EIR; 10	CTR; 10	RIS; 18	MSP	ASE	NHA	JUK; 14	16th	197	
2019	Micks Motorsports	64	Ford	MSP; 15	JUK; 7	ACD; 6	TOR; 12	SAS; 10	SAS; 11	EIR; 13	CTR; 12	RIS; 8	MSP; 24	ASE; 15	NHA; 15	JUK; 13	9th	411	
2021	Wight Motorsports Inc.	64	Chevy	SUN; 11	SUN; 8	CTR; 17	ICAR; 11	MSP; 12	MSP; 12	FLA	FLA	DEL	DEL				17th	193	
2022	Wight Motorsports Inc.	64	Chevy	SUN; 10	MSP; 15	ACD; 12	AVE; 10	TOR; 21	EDM; 12	SAS; 12	SAS; 9	CTR; 17	OSK	ICAR; 19	MSP; 22	DEL; 23	12th	346	
2024	Wight Motorsports Inc.	64	Chevy	MSP	ACD	AVE	RIS; 16	RIS; 14	OSK	SAS; 14	EIR	CTR	ICAR	MSP	DEL	AMS	34th	87	

^{*} Season still in progress
^{1} Ineligible for series points
