= 2018 NASCAR Pinty's Series =

Auto racing season

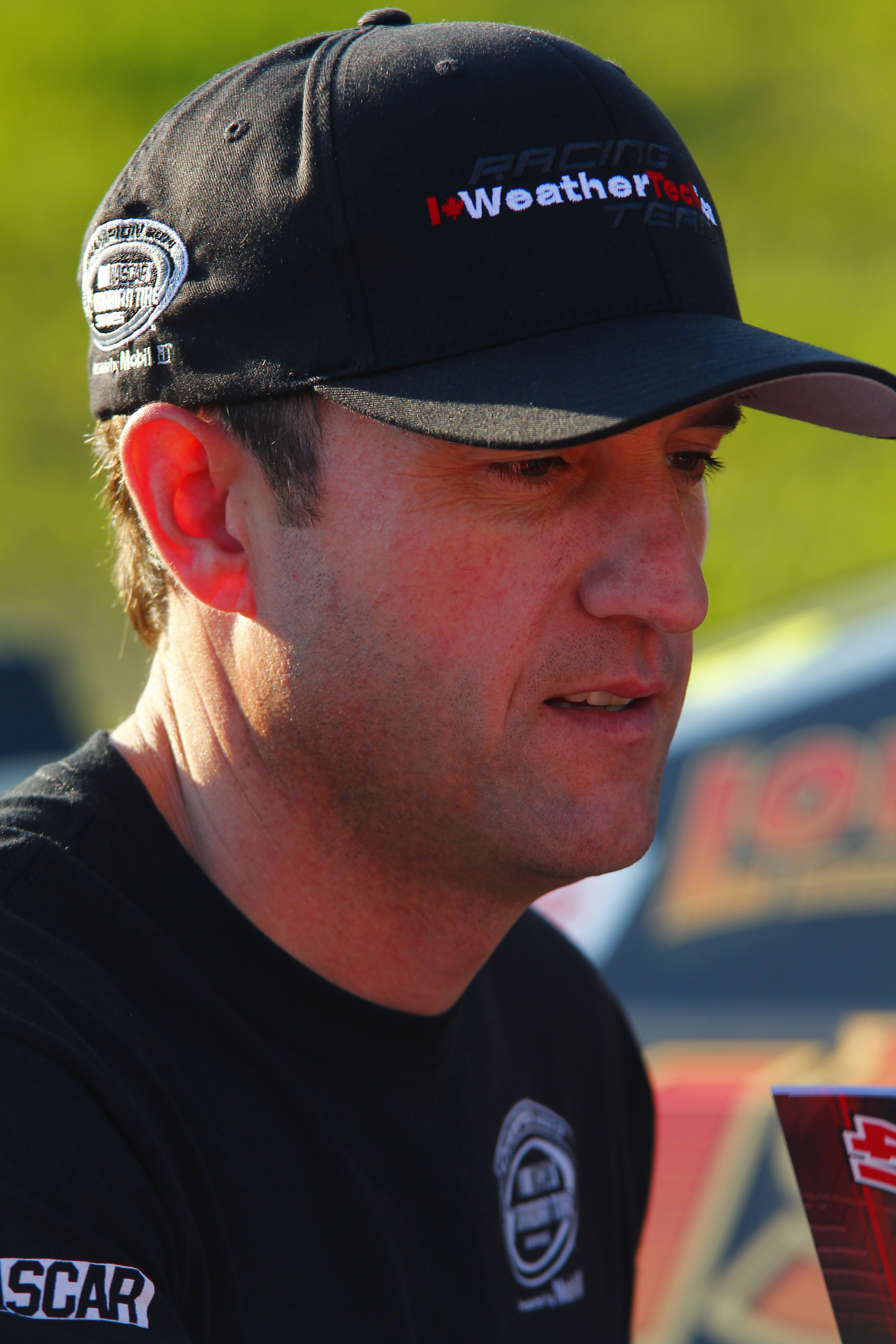
L. P. Dumoulin won his second of three championships.

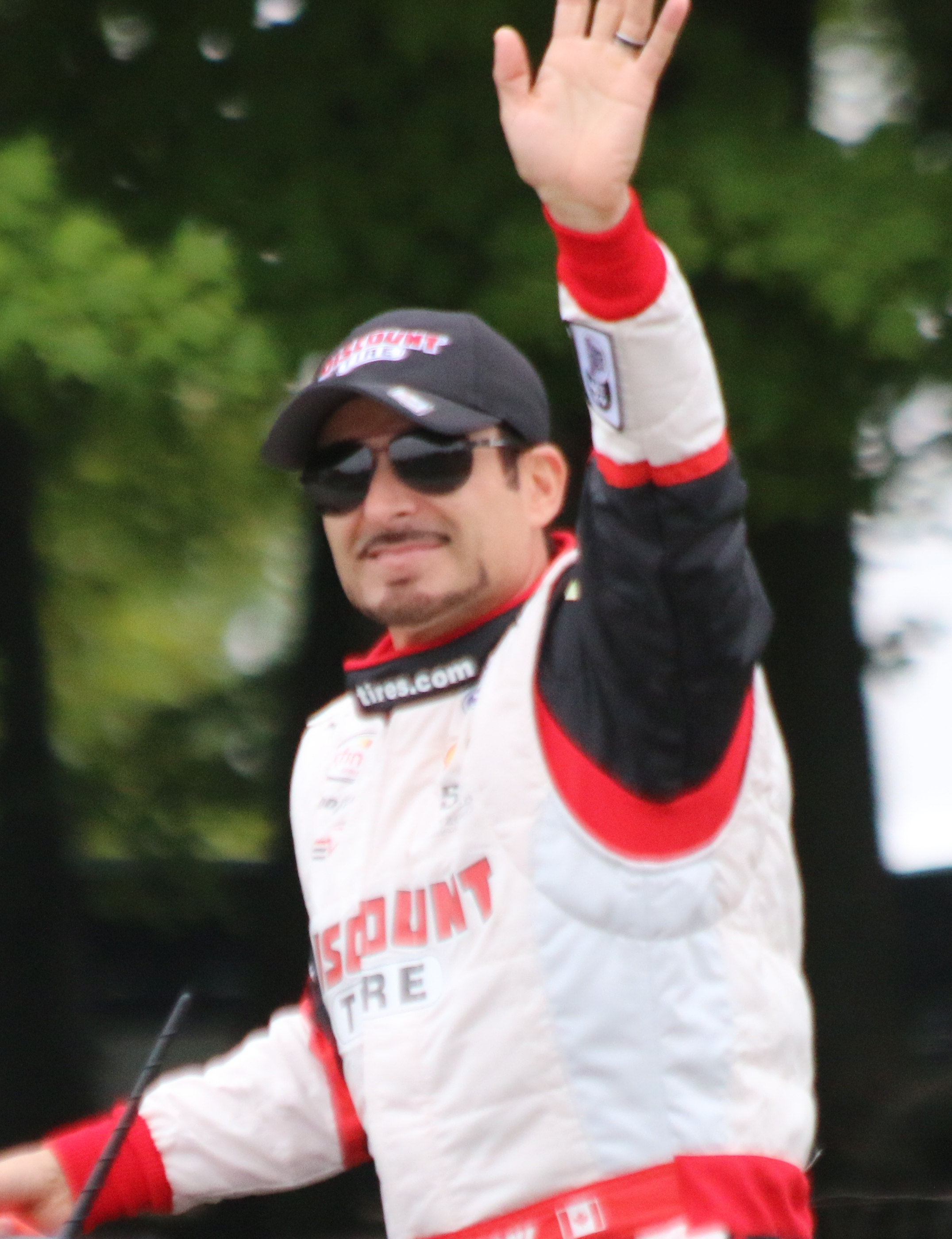
Alex Tagliani finished second by seven points.

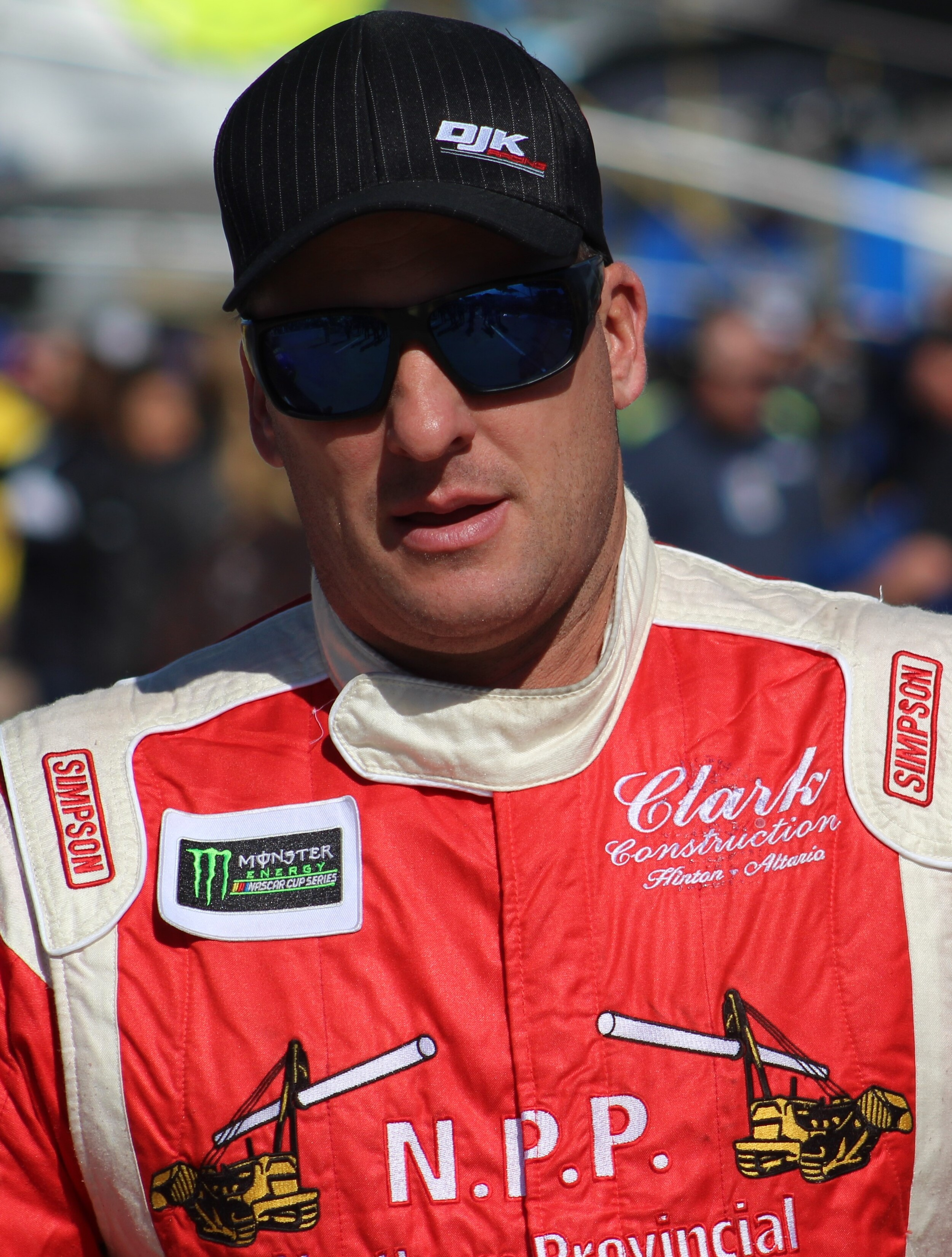
D. J. Kennington finished third by twelve points.

The 2018 NASCAR Pinty's Series was the twelfth season of the Pinty's Series, the national stock car racing series in Canada sanctioned by NASCAR. It began with the Clarington 200 at Canadian Tire Motorsport Park on 20 May and concluded with the Pinty's Fall Brawl at Jukasa Motor Speedway on 29 September. Alex Labbé entered the season as the defending Drivers' champion. Louis-Philippe Dumoulin won the championship, seven points in front of Alex Tagliani.

== Drivers ==
No.	Manufacturer	Car Owner	Race Driver	Crew Chief
1	Ford 6 Dodge 5	Bud Morris	James Vance (R) 4	Joey McColm 5 Francis Bacon 4 Dave Stephens 2
1	Ford 6 Dodge 5	Bud Morris	Joey McColm 3	Joey McColm 5 Francis Bacon 4 Dave Stephens 2
1	Ford 6 Dodge 5	Bud Morris	Larry Jackson 3	Joey McColm 5 Francis Bacon 4 Dave Stephens 2
1	Ford 6 Dodge 5	Bud Morris	Julia Landauer 1	Joey McColm 5 Francis Bacon 4 Dave Stephens 2
02	Ford	Susan Micks	Kerry Micks 7	Rick Walz 5 Clare Bartlett 2 Terry Wilson 2 Rino Montanari 4
02	Ford	Susan Micks	Mark Dilley 6	Rick Walz 5 Clare Bartlett 2 Terry Wilson 2 Rino Montanari 4
3	Chevrolet	Ed Hakonson	Cole Powell	Craig Masters 12
3	Chevrolet	Ed Hakonson	Cole Powell	Jason Hathaway 1
04	Dodge	Eric Kerub	Jean-François Dumoulin 10	Gerard Bouffard 10
04	Dodge	Eric Kerub	Larry Jackson 2	Benoit Laganiere 3
04	Dodge	Eric Kerub	Kerry Micks 1	Benoit Laganiere 3
4	Dodge	Rob McConnell	Trevor Monaghan 1	Rob McConnell
5	Dodge	Kevin Dowler	Noel Dowler 3	Kevin Dowler
07	Dodge	Jean-François Dumoulin	Frédéric Gabillon (R) 1	Bill Burns
9	Ford	Susan Micks	Jean-Frédéric Laberge (R) 1	Kerry Micks 1
9	Ford	Susan Micks	Christopher Sahakian (R) 1	Rino Montanari 1
10	Dodge	Murray Haukaas	Luc Haukaas (R) 3	David Hall 2
10	Dodge	Murray Haukaas	Luc Haukaas (R) 3	Nick Jewell 1
11	Dodge 2	Martin Cote	Martin Cote (R) 3	
11	Dodge 2	Martin Cote	Martin Cote (R) 3	Lus Drapeau 2
11	Chevrolet 1	Martin Cote	Martin Cote (R) 3	Denis Nadeau 1
17	Dodge	D. J. Kennington	D. J. Kennington	Ted McAlister 9
17	Dodge	D. J. Kennington	D. J. Kennington	Scott Fletcher 1
17	Dodge	D. J. Kennington	D. J. Kennington	Doug Thorne 3
18	Chevrolet	Scott Steckly	Alex Tagliani	Tyler Case
19	Ford	Dave Jacombs	Adam Martin	Ron Easton
20	Dodge	Anthony Parisien	Raymond Guay (R) 3	Herby Drescher
21	Dodge	Melissa McKenzie	Jason White 1	Rob McConnell
22	Chevrolet	Scott Steckly	Marc-Antoine Camirand	Randy Steckly 10
22	Chevrolet	Scott Steckly	Marc-Antoine Camirand	Warren Jones 3
24	Chevrolet	Scott Steckly	Donald Theetge	Greg Gibson
25	Dodge 5 Ford 2	Bud Morris	Larry Jackson 3	Dave Stephens 3
25	Dodge 5 Ford 2	Bud Morris	Julia Landauer 1	Todd Cresswell 1
25	Dodge 5 Ford 2	Bud Morris	Joey McColm 2	Ryan Weiss 1
25	Dodge 5 Ford 2	Bud Morris	Joey McColm 2	Francis Bacon 1
27	Dodge	Doug Kennington	Andrew Ranger	David Wight
28	Dodge 10; Chevrolet 1 Ford 1	D. J. Kennington	Noah Gragson 1	Doug Thorne 3 Zack Yeo 4 Rob McConnell 1 Dave Stephens 1 Rick Verberne 1 Ed Wrong 1 Donald Reinhart 1
28	Dodge 10; Chevrolet 1 Ford 1	D. J. Kennington	Jason White 5	Doug Thorne 3 Zack Yeo 4 Rob McConnell 1 Dave Stephens 1 Rick Verberne 1 Ed Wrong 1 Donald Reinhart 1
28	Dodge 10; Chevrolet 1 Ford 1	D. J. Kennington	Joey McColm 2	Doug Thorne 3 Zack Yeo 4 Rob McConnell 1 Dave Stephens 1 Rick Verberne 1 Ed Wrong 1 Donald Reinhart 1
28	Dodge 10; Chevrolet 1 Ford 1	D. J. Kennington	Larry Jackson 1	Doug Thorne 3 Zack Yeo 4 Rob McConnell 1 Dave Stephens 1 Rick Verberne 1 Ed Wrong 1 Donald Reinhart 1
28	Dodge 10; Chevrolet 1 Ford 1	D. J. Kennington	Brandon McReynolds 1	Doug Thorne 3 Zack Yeo 4 Rob McConnell 1 Dave Stephens 1 Rick Verberne 1 Ed Wrong 1 Donald Reinhart 1
28	Dodge 10; Chevrolet 1 Ford 1	D. J. Kennington	Robin Buck 1	Doug Thorne 3 Zack Yeo 4 Rob McConnell 1 Dave Stephens 1 Rick Verberne 1 Ed Wrong 1 Donald Reinhart 1
28	Dodge 10; Chevrolet 1 Ford 1	D. J. Kennington	Julia Landauer 1	Doug Thorne 3 Zack Yeo 4 Rob McConnell 1 Dave Stephens 1 Rick Verberne 1 Ed Wrong 1 Donald Reinhart 1
34	Chevrolet	Lewis Krzysik	Jamie Krzysik (R) 3	Lewis Krzysik
36	Chevrolet	Dave Jacombs	Alex Labbé 1	Dave Jacombs
37	Dodge 3 Ford 1	Clement Samson	Simon Dion-Viens 4	Zack Yeo 1
37	Dodge 3 Ford 1	Clement Samson	Simon Dion-Viens 4	Randy Smith 2
37	Dodge 3 Ford 1	Clement Samson	Simon Dion-Viens 4	Ben Beauchamps 1
42	Chevrolet	Peter Klutt	Peter Klutt 2	Jason Humphries
42	Chevrolet	Peter Klutt	Ryan Klutt 1	Jason Humphries
43	Dodge 4 Ford 1	Ben Busch	Shantel Kalika (R) 3	Ben Busch 3
43	Dodge 4 Ford 1	Ben Busch	Larry Jackson 2	Dave Stephens 2
46	Dodge	Joey McColm	Brett Taylor (R) 12	Ed Wrong 12
46	Dodge	Joey McColm	Joey McColm 1	Todd Cresswell 1
47	Dodge	Marc-André Bergeron	Louis-Philippe Dumoulin	Robin McCluskey
56	Chevrolet	Dan Bray	Brad Graham 2	Mike Knott
56	Chevrolet	Dan Bray	David Michaud (R) 2	Mike Knott
56	Chevrolet	Dan Bray	Luc Lesage (R) 1	Mike Knott
56	Chevrolet	Dan Bray	Malcolm Strachan (R) 1	Mike Knott
59	Dodge	Peter Klutt	Gary Klutt 3	John Fletcher
67	Chevrolet	David Thorndyke	David Thorndyke 2	Kattie Smilovsky
74	Dodge	Sylvain Lacroix	Kevin Lacroix (Note: Kevin Lacroix drove in the Pinty's Grand Prix of Toronto with a Chevrolet-powered backup car from Scott Steckly, after a crash in Qualifying with his Dodge-powered primary car.)	Don Thomson Jr.
77	Dodge	Katherine Almeida	Jocelyn Fecteau 3	Eric-Pierre Martel
79	Ford	Dave Jacombs	Peter Shepherd III 6	Ray McCaughey 6
79	Ford	Dave Jacombs	Steve Cote (R) 1	Jonathan Cote 1
89	Ford	Donald Chisholm	Donald Chisholm 1	George Koszkulics
95	Dodge	Peter Simone	Anthony Simone 6	Jeremy Coulter 2
95	Dodge	Peter Simone	Anthony Simone 6	Greg Franklin 4
97	Dodge	Peter Simone	Connor James (R) 3	Patrick Ripley 2
97	Dodge	Peter Simone	Connor James (R) 3	Rob James 1
97	Dodge	Peter Simone	Armani Williams 1	Glen Schnurr 1

== Schedule ==
On 27 November 2017, NASCAR announced the 2018 schedule. Delaware and ICAR were dropped from the schedule in favor of a second race at Jukasa and a race at New Hampshire, which marked the first race in series history outside Canada.

No.	Race title	Track	Date
1	Clarington 200	Canadian Tire Motorsport Park, Bowmanville	20 May
2	Rankin 200	Jukasa Motor Speedway, Cayuga	16 June
3	Bumper to Bumper 300	Autodrome Chaudière, Vallée-Jonction	30 June
4	Pinty's Grand Prix of Toronto	Exhibition Place, Toronto	14 July
5	Velocity Prairie Thunder Twin 125s sponsored by Bayer CropScience	Wyant Group Raceway, Saskatoon	25 July
6	Velocity Prairie Thunder Twin 125s sponsored by Bayer CropScience	Wyant Group Raceway, Saskatoon	25 July
7	LUXXUR 300 presented by Bayer	Edmonton International Raceway, Wetaskiwin	28 July
8	Le 50 tours Can-Am	Circuit Trois-Rivières, Trois-Rivières	12 August
9	Bumper to Bumper 300	Riverside International Speedway, Antigonish	19 August (Note: The Bumper to Bumper 300 was postponed a day due to a rainfall warning.)
10	Total Quartz 200	Canadian Tire Motorsport Park, Bowmanville	26 August
11	Lucas Oil 250	Autodrome Saint-Eustache, Saint-Eustache	8 September
12	Visit New Hampshire 100	New Hampshire Motor Speedway, Loudon	22 September
13	Pinty's Fall Brawl	Jukasa Motor Speedway, Cayuga	29 September

== Results and standings ==
=== Races ===
No.	Race	Pole position	Most laps led	Winning driver	Manufacturer
1	Clarington 200	Kevin Lacroix	Kevin Lacroix	Louis-Philippe Dumoulin	Dodge
2	Rankin 200	Andrew Ranger	Kevin Lacroix	Kevin Lacroix	Dodge
3	Bumper to Bumper 300	Louis-Philippe Dumoulin	Louis-Philippe Dumoulin	Andrew Ranger	Dodge
4	Pinty's Grand Prix of Toronto	Alex Tagliani	Alex Tagliani	Andrew Ranger	Dodge
5	Velocity Prairie Thunder Twin 125s sponsored by Bayer CropScience	Kevin Lacroix	Donald Theetge	Donald Theetge	Chevrolet
6	Velocity Prairie Thunder Twin 125s sponsored by Bayer CropScience	Louis-Philippe Dumoulin^{1}	Louis-Philippe Dumoulin	Cole Powell	Chevrolet
7	LUXXUR 300 presented by Bayer	Kevin Lacroix	Kevin Lacroix	Louis-Philippe Dumoulin	Dodge
8	Le 50 tours Can-Am	Marc-Antoine Camirand	Marc-Antoine Camirand	Alex Tagliani	Chevrolet
9	Bumper to Bumper 300	Louis-Philippe Dumoulin^{2}	Louis-Philippe Dumoulin	Louis-Philippe Dumoulin	Dodge
10	Total Quartz 200	Louis-Philippe Dumoulin	Alex Tagliani	Alex Tagliani	Chevrolet
11	Lucas Oil 250	Kevin Lacroix	Marc-Antoine Camirand	Marc-Antoine Camirand	Chevrolet
12	Visit New Hampshire 100	Cole Powell	Kevin Lacroix	Kevin Lacroix	Dodge
13	Pinty's Fall Brawl	D. J. Kennington	D. J. Kennington	D. J. Kennington	Dodge

Notes

- ^{1} – Starting grid was set by the fastest lap times from the first Port of Velocity Prairie Thunder Twin 125 race.
- ^{2} – The qualifying session for the Bumper to Bumper 300 was cancelled due to weather. The starting line-up was decided by Owners' championship.

=== Drivers' championship ===
(key) Bold – Pole position awarded by time. Italics – Pole position set by final practice results or Owners' points. * – Most laps led.

Pos.	Driver	MSP	JUK	ACD	TOR	WYA	WYA	EIR	CTR	RIV	MSP	STE	NHA	JUK	Points
1	Louis-Philippe Dumoulin	1	7	**2***	5	16	**2***	1	2	1*	**3**	10	8	10	523
2	Alex Tagliani	14	3	11	**2***	3	6	3	1	5	1*	2	7	13	516
3	D. J. Kennington	4	6	5	8	5	5	5	6	3	6	7	5	**1***	511
4	Cole Powell	6	2	4	12	2	1	4	11	2	14	3	**4**	6	508
5	Kevin Lacroix	**5***	1*	16	16	**6**	7	**2***	20	8	2	**13**^{2}	1*	3	490
6	Marc-Antoine Camirand	2	4	6	6	4	3	6	**5***	13	25	1*	10	7	488
7	Donald Theetge	13	16	3	9	1*	4	15	7	7	10	5	3	2	483
8	Andrew Ranger	12^{1}	**5**	1	1	12	10	12	15	4	8	8	16	5	474
9	Adam Martin	10	12	13	11	17	16	13	12	12	12	14	11	8	411
10	Brett Taylor **(R)**	9	8	15	14	10	15	9	14	11	13	12		12	386
11	Jean-François Dumoulin	22	15	7	3				4	10	4	17	15	11	333
12	Larry Jackson	17		10	18	18	18	8	13	16	15	11		21	319
13	Kerry Micks	7	18	12	17			17			21	4	13		243
14	Joey McColm		17	17		8	11	16				15	14	20	234
15	Peter Shepherd III		9	8	10					6			2	4	225
16	Mark Dilley					7	8	10	10	18				14	197
17	Anthony Simone	18	13		19						5		6	9	194
18	Jason White	15	11		15	14	17							15	177
19	Simon Dion-Viens			9					17		11	16			123
20	James Vance **(R)**	8			7				18		26				117
21	Noel Dowler					9	9	7							107
22	Gary Klutt	19			4						7				103
23	Jamie Krzysik **(R)**					11	13	11							97
24	Luc Haukaas **(R)**					13	12							17	90
25	Connor James **(R)**		10							14				19	89
26	Julia Landauer									15	16		12		89
27	Shantel Kalika **(R)**					15	14	14							89
28	Jocelyn Fecteau	20							19		17				76
29	Martin Cote **(R)**	Wth							21		19		17		75
30	Raymond Guay **(R)**	21							16		23				72
31	David Michaud **(R)**			14								6			68
32	Peter Klutt	11			13										64
33	Brad Graham		14											18	56
34	David Thorndyke	16			Wth						18				54
35	Noah Gragson	3													41
36	Alex Labbé								3						41
37	Frédéric Gabillon **(R)**								8						36
38	Luc Lesage **(R)**								9						35
39	Brandon McReynolds									9					35
40	Malcolm Strachan **(R)**										9				35
41	Steve Cote **(R)**											9			35
42	Armani Williams												9		35
43	Trevor Monaghan													16	28
44	Donald Chisholm									17					27
45	Ryan Klutt										20				24
46	Jean-Frédéric Laberge **(R)**								22						22
47	Christopher Sahakian **(R)**										22				22
48	Robin Buck										24				20
	Glenn Styres **(R)**		Wth												
Pos.	Driver	MSP	JUK	ACD	TOR	WYA	WYA	EIR	CTR	RIV	MSP	STE	NHA	JUK	Points

Notes

- ^{1} – Andrew Ranger was assessed a time penalty for over-aggressive driving on the white-flag lap, dropping him to the end of the lead lap.
- ^{2} – Kevin Lacroix was parked for over-aggressive driving three laps before the finish.

== See also ==
- 2018 Monster Energy NASCAR Cup Series
- 2018 NASCAR Xfinity Series
- 2018 NASCAR Camping World Truck Series
- 2018 NASCAR K&N Pro Series East
- 2018 NASCAR K&N Pro Series West
- 2018 NASCAR Whelen Modified Tour
- 2018 NASCAR PEAK Mexico Series
- 2018 NASCAR Whelen Euro Series
