= Julia Landauer =

American racing driver (born 1991)

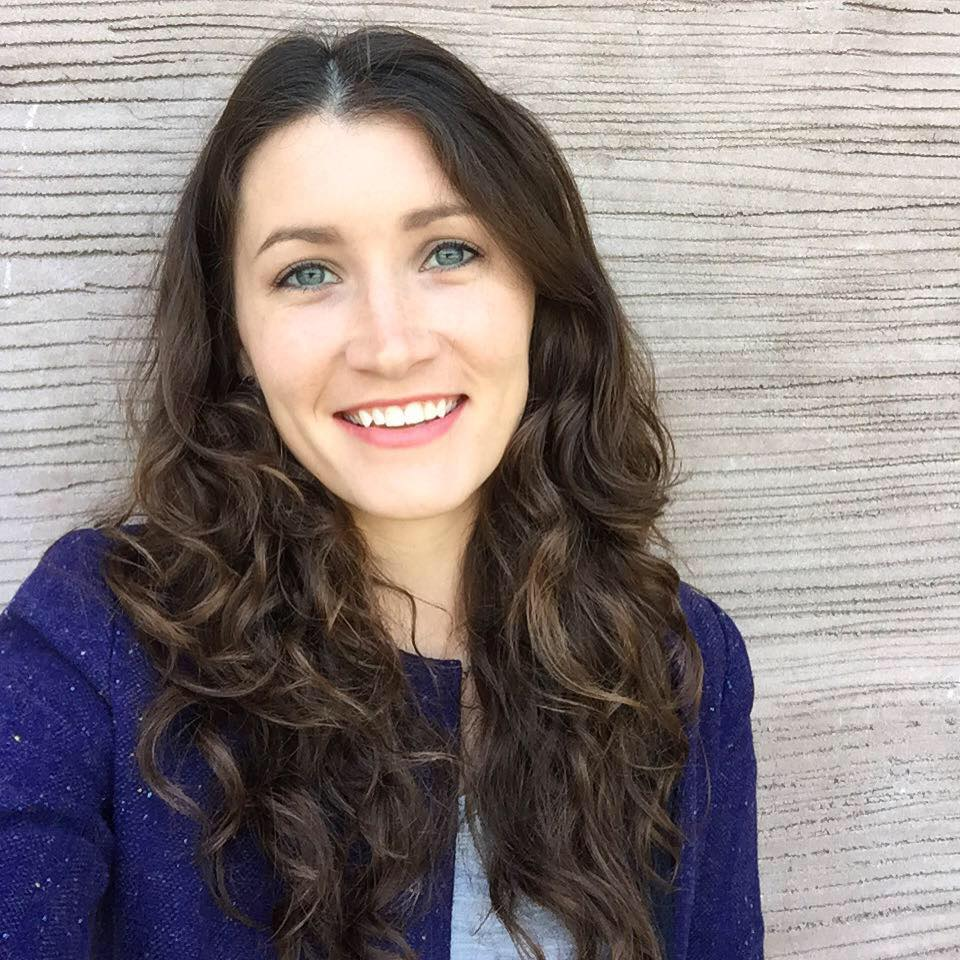
- Landauer at Stanford in 2015
- Born: Julia G. Landauer; November 12, 1991 (age 35) New York, New York, U.S.

NASCAR Whelen Euro Series career
- Debut season: 2020
- Current team: PK Carsport

Previous series
- 2016–2017 2009: NASCAR K&N Pro Series West; Whelen All-American Series

Championship titles
- 2015: Motor Mile Speedway Limited late model

NASCAR O'Reilly Auto Parts Series career
- 2 races run over 1 year
- Best finish: 66th (2022)
- First race: 2022 Crayon 200 (Loudon)
- Last race: 2022 Contender Boats 300 (Homestead–Miami)
Wins	Top tens	Poles
0	0	0

NASCAR Canada Series career
- 9 races run over 2 years
- 2019 position: 17th
- Best finish: 17th (2019)
- First race: 2018 Bumper to Bumper 300 (Riverside)
- Last race: 2019 Total Quartz 200 (Mosport)
Wins	Top tens	Poles
0	1	0
- Statistics up to date as of June 24, 2023.

Julia G. Landauer (born November 12, 1991) is an American professional stock car racing driver and motivational speaker. She last competed part-time in the NASCAR Xfinity Series, driving the No. 45/44 Chevrolet Camaro for Alpha Prime Racing. She has also raced in the NASCAR K&N Pro Series West, driving for Bill McAnally Racing and Sunrise Ford Racing, and in 2016 became the highest-finishing female ever in the season-long points tally, finishing fourth.

In 2013, Landauer was a contestant on Survivor: Caramoan, the 26th season of the CBS reality show Survivor.

== Racing career ==
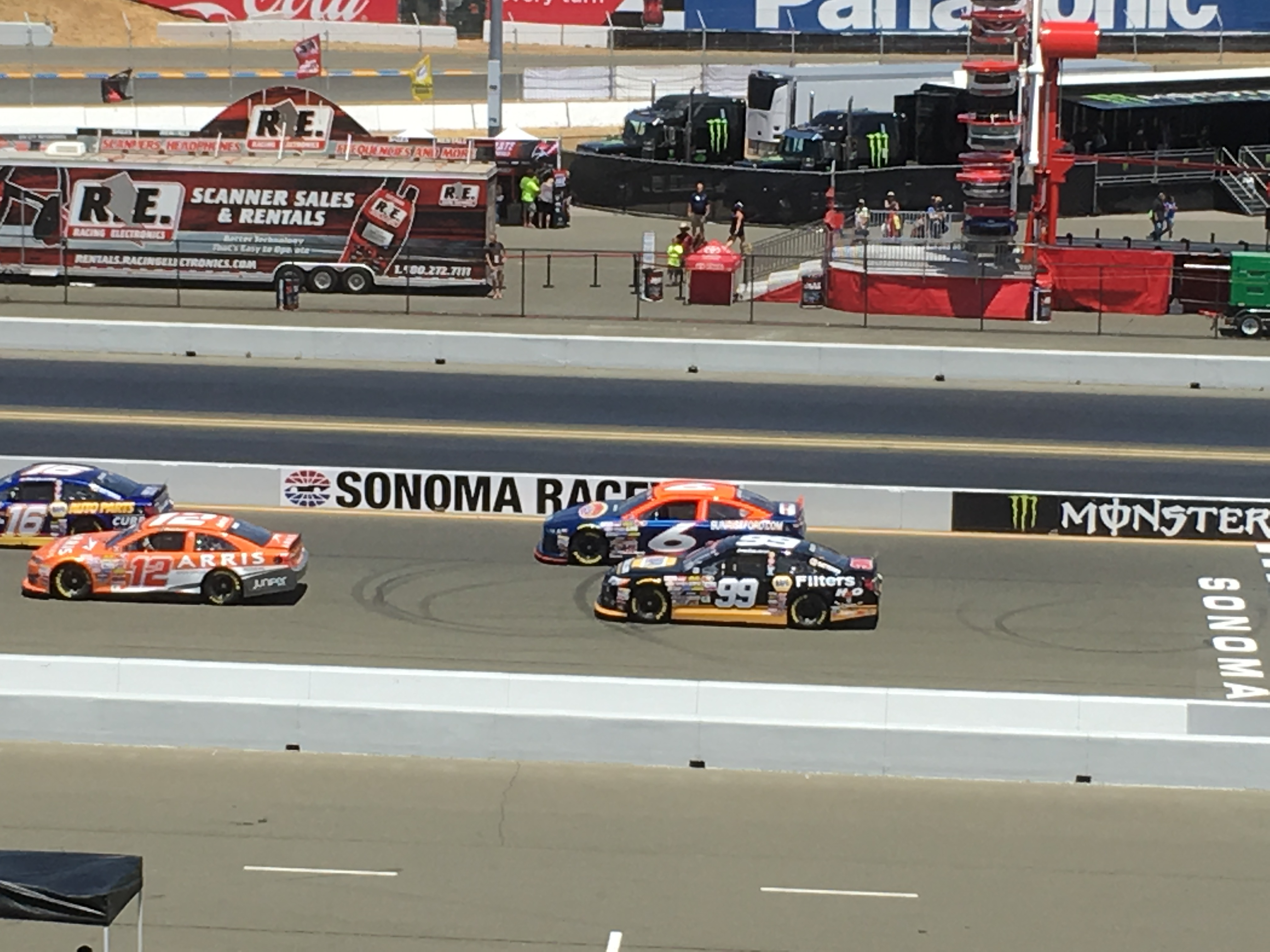
Landauer (No. 6) prior to the 2017 Carneros 200 at Sonoma Raceway.

Landauer began racing go-karts at the age of ten, and found success with many wins and podiums. At 13, Landauer moved to racing cars and the following year became the first female champion of a Skip Barber Racing Series, scoring 12 wins. After racing in Formula BMW USA single-seaters, she gained her first oval-racing experience in Ford Focus Midgets. Landauer then transitioned to late model stock cars, but ran into funding issues. While in college, she competed part-time in late models and Legends cars.

Having caught the attention of owner Bill McAnally in 2009, Landauer competed for his Bill McAnally Racing team in select Late Model races that year, running in the Whelen All-American Series Late Model division at All American Speedway. In 2015 at the Motor Mile Speedway, Landauer competed for Lee Pulliam Performance, winning the All-American Series-sanctioned Limited Late Model track championship, the first female track champion in that division, and the first female track champion since Sheryl Carls in 2011. She also competed in the track's Limited Sportsman division, winning in her debut.

For 2016, Landauer was selected by McAnally and his business partner, record executive and former Lieutenant Governor of California Mike Curb, to drive for a fourth team in the K&N Pro Series West. Behind the wheel of the No. 54 Toyota Camry, she finished eighth in her debut at Irwindale Speedway, going on to record seven top-five finishes and thirteen top-tens in fourteen races, for which she was honored with the 2016 Driver Achievement Award and named the series's Top Breakthrough Driver. During the course of the season, she was also invited to be a part of the NASCAR Next program, the only female in the 2016 class.

In 2018, Landauer secured three races with CBRT in the NASCAR Pinty's Series. The following year, she became the first woman to lead a lap in the Pinty's Series.

In 2020, Landauer joined PK Carsport for a full-time NASCAR Whelen Euro Series EuroNASCAR 2 campaign.

In 2022, Landauer raced in the Xfinity Series for Alpha Prime Racing starting with the July 16 race at New Hampshire Motor Speedway. Landauer then raced on October 22 at Homestead Miami Speedway with the sponsorship from ATEM Car Club.

== Personal life ==
Landauer graduated from Manhattan's Stuyvesant High School in 2010. In 2014, she attained a bachelor's degree in science, technology, and society from Stanford University. Landauer has also been a motivational speaker at events like TEDx. In 2017, she was named to Forbes magazine's 30 Under 30 list for sports.

Landauer first gained national exposure as a contestant on the twenty-sixth season of Survivor (2013), reaching Day 19 before she was voted out (the eighth contestant to be eliminated). She is originally from New York City, and has since moved to Charlotte, North Carolina, where most NASCAR teams are based.

== Motorsports career results ==
=== Racing career summary ===
Season	Series	Team	Races	Wins	Top 5	Top 10	Points	Position
2016	NASCAR K&N Pro Series West	Bill McAnally Racing	14	0	7	13	528	4th
2017	NASCAR K&N Pro Series West	Sunrise Ford Racing	14	0	1	7	451	7th
2017	NASCAR K&N Pro Series East	Troy Cline	2	0	0	1	61	30th
2018	NASCAR Pinty's Series	Canada's Best Racing Team	2	0	0	0	89	26th
2018	NASCAR Pinty's Series	DJK Racing	1	0	0	0	89	26th
2019	NASCAR Pinty's Series	DJK Racing	6	0	0	1	184	17th
2022	NASCAR Xfinity Series	Alpha Prime Racing	2	0	0	0	10	66th

=== NASCAR ===
(key) (Bold – Pole position awarded by qualifying time. Italics – Pole position earned by points standings or practice time. * – Most laps led.)

==== Xfinity Series ====
NASCAR Xfinity Series results
Year	Team	No.	Make	1	2	3	4	5	6	7	8	9	10	11	12	13	14	15	16	17	18	19	20	21	22	23	24	25	26	27	28	29	30	31	32	33	NXSC	Pts	Ref
2022	Alpha Prime Racing	45	Chevy	DAY	CAL	LVS	PHO	ATL	COA	RCH	MAR	TAL	DOV	DAR	TEX	CLT	PIR	NSH	ROA	ATL	NHA; 36	POC	IND	MCH	GLN	DAY	DAR	KAN	BRI	TEX	TAL	CLT	LVS				66th	10	
2022	Alpha Prime Racing	44	Chevy																															HOM; 28	MAR	PHO	66th	10	

==== K&N Pro Series East ====
NASCAR K&N Pro Series East results
Year	Team	No.	Make	1	2	3	4	5	6	7	8	9	10	11	12	13	14	NKNPSEC	Pts	Ref
2017	Troy Cline	88	Ford	NSM	GRE	BRI; 7	SBO	SBO	MEM	BLN	TMP	NHA; 20	IOW	GLN	LGY	NJM	DOV	30th	61	

==== K&N Pro Series West ====
NASCAR K&N Pro Series West results
Year	Team	No.	Make	1	2	3	4	5	6	7	8	9	10	11	12	13	14	NKNPSWC	Pts	Ref
2016	Bill McAnally Racing	54	Toyota	IRW; 8	KCR; 10	TUS; 5	OSS; 5	CNS; 6	SON; 11	SLS; 5	IOW; 8	EVG; 8	DCS; 5	MMP; 4	MMP; 8	MER; 2	AAS; 3	4th	528	
2017	Sunrise Ford Racing	6	Ford	TUS; 12	KCR; 12	IRW; 10	IRW; 6	SPO; 7	OSS; 19	CNS; 6	SON; 23		EVG; 6	DCS; 5	MER; 9	AAS; 21	KCR; 12	7th	451	
2017	Sunrise Ford Racing	22	Ford									IOW; 17						7th	451	

==== Pinty's Series ====
NASCAR Pinty's Series results
Year	Team	No.	Make	1	2	3	4	5	6	7	8	9	10	11	12	13	NPSC	Pts	Ref
2018	Canada's Best Racing Team	1	Ford	MSP	JUK	ACD	TOR	SAS	SAS	EIR	CTR	RIS; 15					26th	89	
2018	Canada's Best Racing Team	25	Ford										MSP; 16	ASE; Wth			26th	89	
2018	DJK Racing	28	Ford												NHA; 12	JUK	26th	89	
2019	DJK Racing	28	Dodge	MSP	JUK; 15	ACD	TOR	SAS; 17	SAS; 12	EIR	CTR	RIS	MSP; 10	ASE	NHA; 13	JUK; 14	17th	184	

^{*} Season still in progress
^{1} Ineligible for series points
