= 2019 NASCAR Pinty's Series =

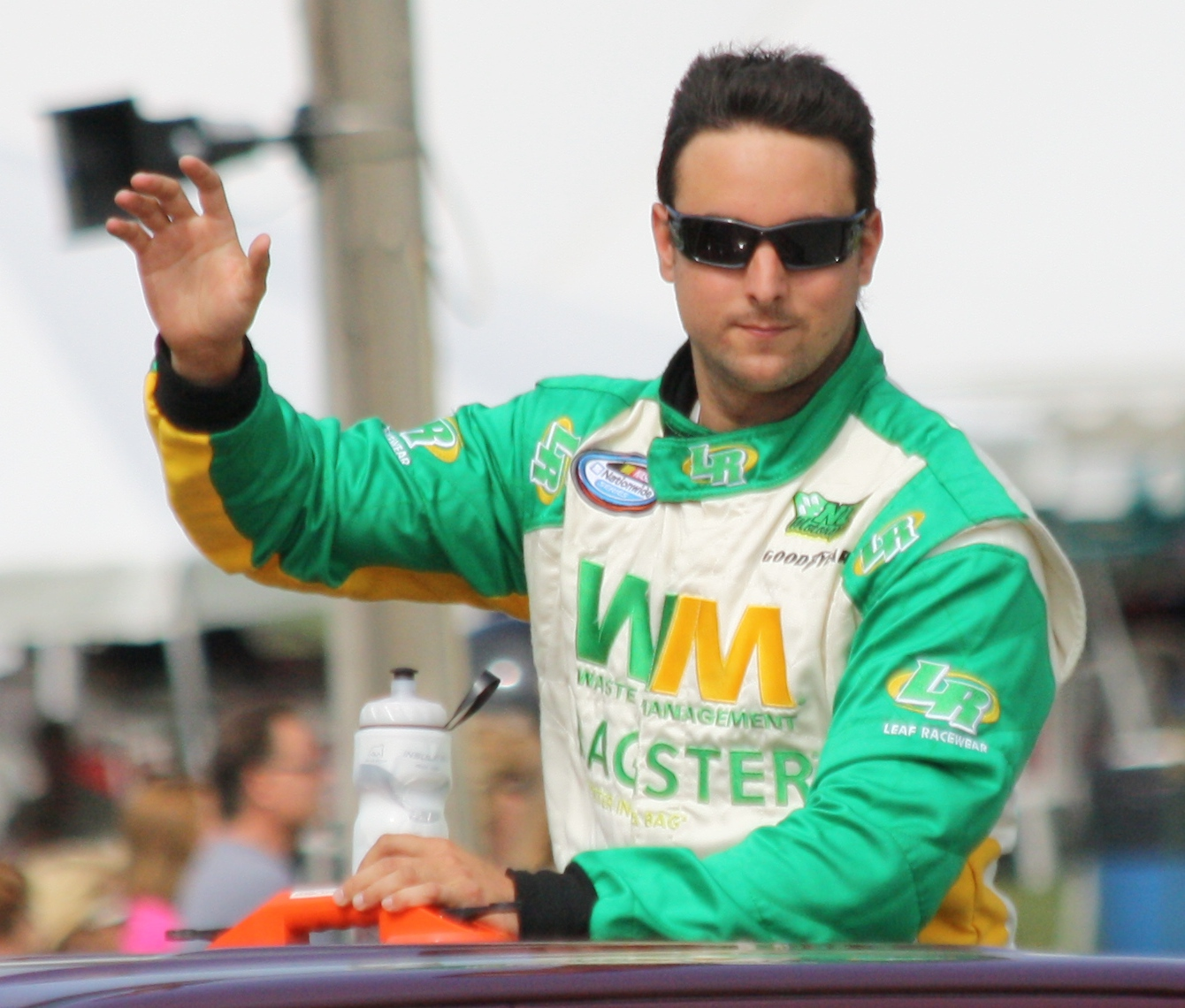
Andrew Ranger, the 2019 champion

The 2019 NASCAR Pinty's Series is the thirteenth season of the Pinty's Series, the national stock car racing series in Canada sanctioned by NASCAR. It began with the Clarington 200 at Canadian Tire Motorsport Park on 19 May and concluded with the Pinty's Fall Brawl at Jukasa Motor Speedway on 28 September.

Louis-Philippe Dumoulin entered the season as the defending Drivers' champion. Andrew Ranger won the championship, eleven points ahead of Kevin Lacroix.

== Drivers ==
No.	Manufacturer	Car Owner	Race Driver	Crew Chief
1	Dodge	Bud Morris	Anthony Simone 11	Joey McColm 9 Ed Wrong 3
1	Dodge	Bud Morris	Joey McColm 1	Joey McColm 9 Ed Wrong 3
02	Ford	Susan Micks	T. J. Rinomato (R) 11	Terry Wilson 12; Clare Bartlett 1
02	Ford	Susan Micks	Kerry Micks 2	Terry Wilson 12; Clare Bartlett 1
3	Chevrolet	Ed Hakonson	Jason Hathaway	Craig Masters
04	Dodge 4	Eric Kerub 4	Jean-François Dumoulin 4	Gerard Bouffard 4
04	Chevrolet 9	Brandon White 9	Brandon White 9	Zachary Goodleaf 7
04	Chevrolet 9	Brandon White 9	Brandon White 9	Denis Hebert 1
04	Chevrolet 9	Brandon White 9	Brandon White 9	Dale Inman 1
07	Dodge	Jean-François Dumoulin	Raphaël Lessard 2	John Fletcher 2
07	Dodge	Jean-François Dumoulin	Jean-François Dumoulin 2	Patrick Harnois 1
07	Dodge	Jean-François Dumoulin	Jean-François Dumoulin 2	Gerard Bouffard 1
7	Ford	Dave Jacombs	Peter Shepherd III 3	Ray McCaughey 1
7	Ford	Dave Jacombs	Peter Shepherd III 3	Randy Smith 2
10	Dodge	Murray Haukaas	Luc Haukaas (R) 2	Dave Hall
17	Dodge	D. J. Kennington	D. J. Kennington	Ted McAlister
18	Chevrolet	Scott Steckly	Alex Tagliani 10	Tyler Case
18	Chevrolet	Scott Steckly	Scott Steckly 1	Tyler Case
18	Chevrolet	Scott Steckly	Alex Guenette 2	Tyler Case
20	Dodge	Anthony Parisien	Raymond Guay (R) 3	Herby Drescher
21	Dodge	Melissa McKenzie 8	Jason White 7	Larry Jackson 8
21	Dodge	Melissa McKenzie 8	Dexter Stacey 1	Larry Jackson 8
21	Dodge	Melissa McKenzie 8	Larry Jackson 3	Larry Jackson 8
21	Dodge	Bud Morris 3	Larry Jackson 3	Dave Stephens 3
22	Chevrolet	Scott Steckly	Marc-Antoine Camirand	Warren Jones
24	Chevrolet	Scott Steckly	Donald Theetge	Greg Gibson
26	Chevrolet	Scott Steckly	Chandler Smith 1	Randy Steckly
27	Dodge	Doug Kennington	Andrew Ranger	David Wight
28	Dodge	D. J. Kennington	Riley Herbst 1	Doug Thorne 1
28	Dodge	D. J. Kennington	Julia Landauer 6	Scott Sans 6
33	Chevrolet	Ed Hakonson	Kevin Poitras 1	Jeff Thomas
34	Chevrolet	Louis Krzysik	Jamie Krzysik 4	Louis Krzysik
36	Ford	Dave Jacombs	Alex Labbé 12	Ron Easton
36	Ford	Dave Jacombs	Sam Charland (R) 1	Ron Easton
37	Ford	Clement Samson 3	Simon Dion-Viens 5	Randy Smith
37	Ford	Dave Jacombs 2	Simon Dion-Viens 5	Randy Smith
39	Dodge	Jacques Guenette	Alex Guenette 1	Unknown
42	Chevrolet	Peter Klutt	Peter Klutt 2	Luigi Ciarafoni 1 Jason Humphries 2
42	Chevrolet	Peter Klutt	Ryan Klutt 1	Luigi Ciarafoni 1 Jason Humphries 2
43	Dodge	Ben Busch	Shantel Kalika 5	Ben Busch 5
43	Dodge	Ben Busch	Todd Cresswell 1	Dave Stephens 1
46	Dodge	Joey McColm 1	Brett Taylor 10	Ed Wrong 4
46	Dodge	Bud Morris 2	Brett Taylor 10	Jeff Thomas 4
46	Dodge	Ed Hakonson 4	Brett Taylor 10	Jason Hankewich 1
46	Dodge	Brett Taylor 3	Brett Taylor 10	Howie Scannell Jr. 1
47	Dodge	Marc-André Bergeron	Louis-Philippe Dumoulin	Robin McCluskey
56	Chevrolet 4 Dodge 1	Jim Bray	David Thorndyke 1	Kattie Smilovsky 1 Jonathan Lavoie 1 Mike Knott 3
56	Chevrolet 4 Dodge 1	Jim Bray	David Michaud 2	Kattie Smilovsky 1 Jonathan Lavoie 1 Mike Knott 3
56	Chevrolet 4 Dodge 1	Jim Bray	Malcolm Strachan (R) 1	Kattie Smilovsky 1 Jonathan Lavoie 1 Mike Knott 3
56	Chevrolet 4 Dodge 1	Jim Bray	Matt Pritiko (R) 1	Kattie Smilovsky 1 Jonathan Lavoie 1 Mike Knott 3
59	Dodge	Peter Klutt	Gary Klutt 3	John Fletcher
64	Ford	Susan Micks	Mark Dilley	Rino Montanari
67	Chevrolet	David Thorndyke	David Thorndyke 2	Kattie Smilovsky
73	Dodge	D. J. Kennington	Cole Powell 2	Steve Verberne
74	Dodge	Sylvain Lacroix	Kevin Lacroix	Don Thomson Jr.
75	Dodge	Sylvain Lacroix	Mathieu Kingsbury 3	Jean-Pierre Cyr
77	Dodge	Katherine Almeida	Jocelyn Fecteau 3	Eric-Pierre Martel
89	Ford	Donald Chisholm	Donald Chisholm 1	George Koszkulics
91	Dodge	Jean-François Dumoulin	Jean-Frédéric Laberge (R) 4	Dany Emond 4
91	Dodge	Jean-François Dumoulin	Dexter Stacey 1	Joey McColm 1

== Schedule ==
On 10 January 2019, NASCAR announced the 2019 schedule.

No.	Race title	Track	Date
1	Clarington 200	Canadian Tire Motorsport Park, Bowmanville	19 May
2	APC 200	Jukasa Motor Speedway, Cayuga	2 June (Note: The APC 200 was postponed a day due to rain.)
3	Budweiser 300	Autodrome Chaudière, Vallée-Jonction	29 June
4	Pinty's Grand Prix of Toronto	Exhibition Place, Toronto	13 July
5	Bayer Velocity Prairie Thunder Twin 125s	Wyant Group Raceway, Saskatoon	24 July
6	Bayer Velocity Prairie Thunder Twin 125s	Wyant Group Raceway, Saskatoon	24 July
7	Luxxur 300	Edmonton International Raceway, Wetaskiwin	27 July
8	Hotel Le Concorde 50	Circuit Trois-Rivières, Trois-Rivières	11 August
9	Bumper to Bumper 300	Riverside International Speedway, Antigonish	17 August
10	Total Quartz 200	Canadian Tire Motorsport Park, Bowmanville	25 August
11	Lucas Oil 250	Autodrome Saint-Eustache, Saint-Eustache	8 September (Note: The Lucas Oil 250 was postponed a day due to rain.)
12	Visit New Hampshire 100	New Hampshire Motor Speedway, Loudon	21 September
13	Pinty's Fall Brawl	Jukasa Motor Speedway, Cayuga	28 September

== Results and standings ==
=== Races ===
No.	Race	Pole position	Most laps led	Winning driver	Manufacturer
1	Clarington 200	Gary Klutt	Kevin Lacroix	Kevin Lacroix	Dodge
2	APC 200	Andrew Ranger	Andrew Ranger	Andrew Ranger	Dodge
3	Budweiser 300	Alex Labbé	Raphaël Lessard	Raphaël Lessard	Dodge
4	Pinty's Grand Prix of Toronto	Alex Tagliani	Alex Tagliani	Alex Tagliani	Chevrolet
5	Bayer Velocity Prairie Thunder Twin 125	Louis-Philippe Dumoulin	Kevin Lacroix	Louis-Philippe Dumoulin	Dodge
6	Bayer Velocity Prairie Thunder Twin 125	Andrew Ranger	Andrew Ranger	Andrew Ranger	Dodge
7	Luxxur 300	Kevin Lacroix	Andrew Ranger	Andrew Ranger	Dodge
8	Les 50 tours Hotel Le Concorde	Andrew Ranger	Alex Tagliani	Louis-Philippe Dumoulin	Dodge
9	Bumper to Bumper 300	Donald Chisholm	Kevin Lacroix	Jason Hathaway	Chevrolet
10	Total Quartz 200	Kevin Lacroix	Alex Tagliani	Kevin Lacroix	Dodge
11	Lucas Oil 250	Kevin Lacroix	Alex Labbé	Jason Hathaway	Chevrolet
12	Visit New Hampshire 100	Kevin Lacroix	Kevin Lacroix	Andrew Ranger	Dodge
13	Pinty's Fall Brawl	Kevin Lacroix	Kevin Lacroix	Brett Taylor	Dodge

=== Drivers' championship ===
(key) Bold – Pole position awarded by time. Italics – Pole position set by final practice results or Owners' points. * – Most laps led.

Pos.	Driver	MSP	JUK	ACD	TOR	WYA	WYA	EIR	CTR	RIV	MSP	STE	NHA	JUK	Points
1	Andrew Ranger	2	**1***	4	2	3	1*	1*	8	7	9	3	1	4	550
2	Kevin Lacroix	1*	2	2	4	2*	5	7	4	6*	**1**	2	**12***	5*	539
3	Louis-Philippe Dumoulin	4	4	15	3	**1**	4	3	1	4	13	7	9	10	505
4	Jason Hathaway	5	14	16	8	5	17	2	6	1	6	1	17	2	481
5	D. J. Kennington	8	8	12	9	16	2	10	5	2	7	6	3	8	480
6	Donald Theetge	13	10	10	11	7	7	5	10	13	12	5	20	3	447
7	Marc-Antoine Camirand	18	6	11	16	9	9	6	18	10	2	9	5	11	442
8	Alex Labbé	7	13	3	18	4	10	4	19	5	22	4*	2		420
9	Mark Dilley	15	7	6	12	10	11	13	12	8	24	15	15	13	411
10	Alex Tagliani	11	5	5	**1***	11	6	8	2*	3	4*				394
11	Anthony Simone	19	16	17	6	13	14	9	20		5		10	12	343
12	Brett Taylor	21	11	7	13	6	3	16		12			19	1	335
13	T. J. Rinomato **(R)**	17	18	14	14	18	18	15	17		21		16	22	294
14	Brandon White		17	8		15	13	12		11		14	11	19	276
15	Jean-François Dumoulin	6			5				3		3		14	20	214
16	Jason White	10	9	13	10	14	16							23	213
17	Julia Landauer		15			17	12				10		13	14	184
18	Simon Dion-Viens	12		9					9		8	12			170
19	Shantel Kalika **(R)**		12			19	19	14						18	138
20	Jamie Krzysik					8	8	11						24	125
21	Peter Shepherd III		3										4	6	120
22	Jean-Frédéric Laberge **(R)**	14			19				16		17				110
23	Alex Guenette								11				7	7	107
24	Mathieu Kingsbury											10	8	9	105
25	Gary Klutt	**3**			17						11				103
26	Raymond Guay **(R)**	16							13		14				89
27	Raphaël Lessard			1*					7						85
28	Larry Jackson							17	15		16				84
29	David Thorndyke	23			15						19				75
30	Jocelyn Fecteau	22							21		15				74
31	Peter Klutt	9			7										72
32	Kerry Micks									14		8			66
33	Cole Powell												6	17	65
34	Luc Haukaas **(R)**					12	15								61
35	David Michaud								14			13			61
36	Dexter Stacey												18	15	55
37	Donald Chisholm									**9**					36
38	Scott Steckly											11			33
39	Joey McColm											16			28
40	Matt Pritiko **(R)**													16	28
41	Todd Cresswell											17			27
42	Kevin Poitras										18				26
43	Riley Herbst	20													24
44	Malcolm Strachan **(R)**										20				24
45	Sam Charland **(R)**													21	23
46	Chandler Smith										23				21
47	Ryan Klutt										25				19
Pos.	Driver	MSP	JUK	ACD	TOR	WYA	WYA	EIR	CTR	RIV	MSP	STE	NHA	JUK	Points

== See also ==
- 2019 Monster Energy NASCAR Cup Series
- 2019 NASCAR Xfinity Series
- 2019 NASCAR Gander Outdoors Truck Series
- 2019 ARCA Menards Series
- 2019 NASCAR K&N Pro Series East
- 2019 NASCAR K&N Pro Series West
- 2019 NASCAR Whelen Modified Tour
- 2019 NASCAR PEAK Mexico Series
- 2019 NASCAR Whelen Euro Series
