= 2010 NASCAR Canadian Tire Series =

Seasons
- ← 2009 2011 →

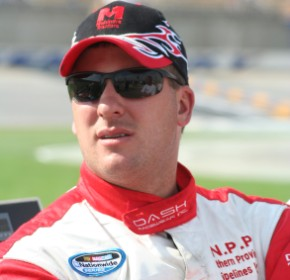
D. J. Kennington, the 2010 champion

The 2010 NASCAR Canadian Tire Series was the fourth racing season since the buy out of the CASCAR Super Series.

== Overview ==
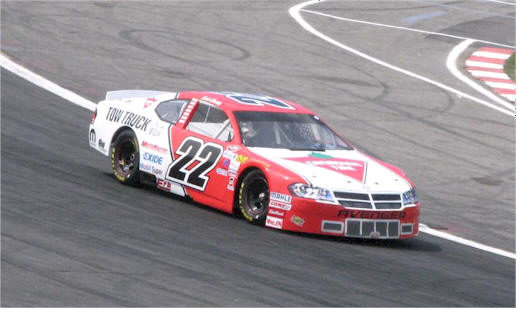
Scott Steckly on track.

In 2010 many procedures in the series remained the same, with all of the races airing on TSN, in tape-delayed one-hour segments excluding Montreal and the Toronto Indy. TSN and RDS provided live coverage of the NAPA Autopro 100 from the Circuit Gilles Villeneuve on Sunday, August 29 and July 25 from the streets of Toronto. Major changes to the series included former CASCAR champion Dave Whitlock and his team closing down leaving many looking for rides. Mark Dilley joined up with Scott Steckly to run full-time and Internet superstar Pierre Bourque drove the 00 Aaron's Lucky Dog car full-time. Last year's champion Andrew Ranger did not compete full-time as his sponsors backed out of a deal and he focused on the NASCAR K&N Pro Series East in America and elected to run only part-time in the Canadian Tire Series.

The series kicked off at Delaware Speedway with D. J. Kennington defending his win in a close battle with J. R. Fitzpatrick who would end up winning the race at Mosport International Raceway. Kennington won the third race of the year after leading only the last lap passing both Kerry Micks and Scott Steckly en route to victory at Autodrome Saint-Eustache. Ranger led the majority of the race en route to victory in Toronto while Fitzpatrick won in Edmonton starting the western road swing. Kennington led the majority of the race at Motoplex Speedway but was overtaken by Scott Steckly late in the race for the win. Jason Hathaway finished second but was demoted to ninth for illegal tire changes. Kennington picked up where he left off, earning his third victory of the season at Auto Clearing Motor Speedway, from pole position. As a result, Kennington returned to the top of the championship standings. Andrew Ranger won in Trois-Rivières, giving Fitzpatrick the points lead by one point over Kennington following the race. Don Thomson Jr. got back to his old ways by winning at the Mosport Oval. At Montreal, Andrew Ranger bumped Jason Bowles in the last turn for his fourth win of the year, both Kennington and Fitzpatrick had problems. Kennington went on to win the next two races at Riverside and Barrie Speedway to take a lead of 40 points over Fitzpatrick, into the final round of the season at Kawartha Speedway. At Kawartha, Peter Shepherd III won the race, with Kennington finishing third to claim the championship.

== Schedule ==
2011 venues

Race	Name	Track	Date
1	Keystone Light 200	Delaware Speedway, Delaware	June 5
2	Vortex Brake Pads 200	Mosport International Raceway, Bowmanville	June 13
3	Lucas Oil National 250	Autodrome Saint-Eustache, Saint-Eustache	July 3
4	Jumpstart 100	Exhibition Place, Toronto	July 17
5	Canadian Tire 100	Edmonton City Centre Airport	July 25
6	A&W Cruisin' the Dub 300	Motoplex Speedway, Vernon	July 31
7	Velocity Prairie Thunder	Auto Clearing Motor Speedway, Saskatoon	August 4
8	GP3R 100	Circuit Trois-Rivières, Trois-Rivières	August 15
9	Dickies 200	Mosport International Raceway, Bowmanville	August 21
10	NAPA Autopro 100	Circuit Gilles Villeneuve, Montreal	August 29
11	Wild Wing 300	Barrie Speedway, Oro-Medonte	September 11
12	Komatsu 300	Riverside Speedway, James River	September 18
13	Kawartha 250	Kawartha Speedway, Fraserville	September 25

== Results ==
=== Races ===
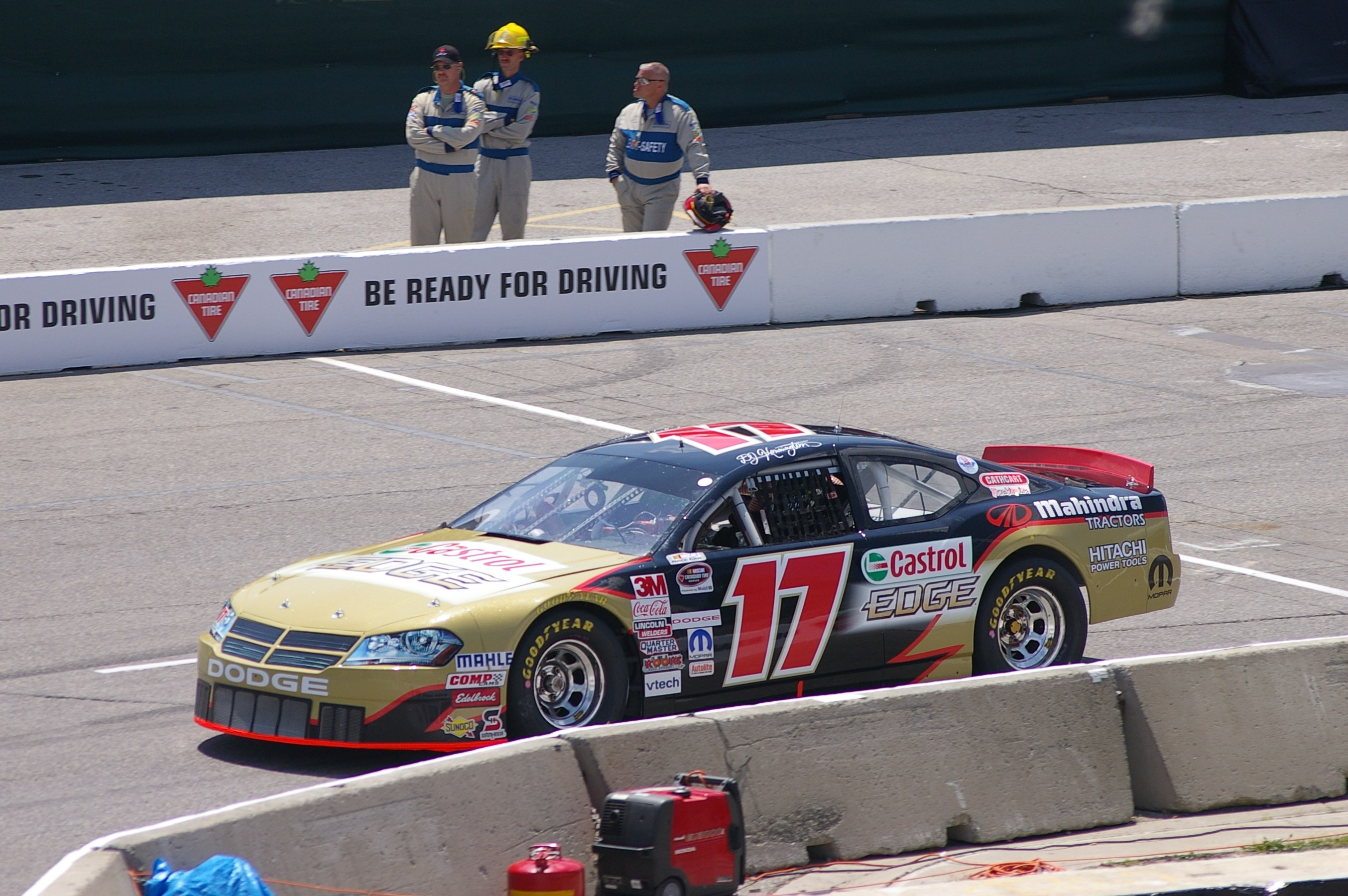
D. J. Kennington during the Jumpstart 100. Kennington beat J. R. Fitzpatrick to the title by 87 points.

Race	Event	Pole winner	Most Laps Led	Race winner	Manufacturer Winner
1	Keystone Light 200	D. J. Kennington	D. J. Kennington	D. J. Kennington	Dodge
2	Vortex Brake Pads 200	Andrew Ranger	J. R. Fitzpatrick	J. R. Fitzpatrick	Chevrolet
3	Lucas Oil National 250	Kerry Micks	Scott Steckly	D. J. Kennington	Dodge
4	Jumpstart 100	Andrew Ranger	Andrew Ranger	Andrew Ranger	Dodge
5	Canadian Tire 100	J. R. Fitzpatrick	J. R. Fitzpatrick	J. R. Fitzpatrick	Dodge
6	A&W Cruisin' the Dub 300	D. J. Kennington	D. J. Kennington	Scott Steckly	Dodge
7	Velocity Prairie Thunder	D. J. Kennington	D. J. Kennington	D. J. Kennington	Dodge
8	GP3R 100	Andrew Ranger	Andrew Ranger / J. R. Fitzpatrick	Andrew Ranger	Dodge
9	Dickies 200	D. J. Kennington	Don Thomson Jr.	Don Thomson Jr.	Chevrolet
10	NAPA Autopro 100	Andrew Ranger	Andrew Ranger	Andrew Ranger	Dodge
11	Wild Wing 300	Ron Beauchamp Jr.	Scott Steckly	D. J. Kennington	Dodge
12	Komatsu 300	Scott Steckly	D. J. Kennington	D. J. Kennington	Dodge
13	Kawartha 250	D. J. Kennington	Peter Shepherd III	Peter Shepherd III	Dodge

- In green, the drivers who made pole, led most laps and won the same race.

=== Standings ===
(key) Bold - Pole position awarded by time. Italics - Pole position set by final practice results or rainout. * – Most laps led.

Pos	Driver	DEL	MSP	STE	TOR	EDM	VER	SAS	CTR	MSP	MON	BAR	RIV	KAW	Pts
1	D. J. Kennington	**1***	6	1	3	15	**2***	**1***	4	**6**	28	1	1*	**3**	2117
2	J. R. Fitzpatrick	2	1*	8	8	**1***	6	2	3*	2	18	5	13	15	2030
3	Scott Steckly	16	4	2*	11	3	1	4	6	17	4	4*	**2**	6	2022
4	Don Thomson Jr.	21	8	3	4	8	3	3	22	1*	2	2	3	5	2006
5	Kerry Micks	9	5	**6**	5	5	12	7	2	3	6	14	6	2	1977
6	Jason Hathaway	10	10	4	22	6	9	6	8	14	5	10	5	7	1826
7	Ron Beauchamp Jr.	8	13	5	29	18	10	11	18	4	9	**6**	4	10	1731
8	Mark Dilley	12	9	10	24	16	4	8	10	7	31	12	8	4	1701
9	Anthony Simone	20	25	7	30	2	5	9	26	8	27	7	7	12	1601
10	Dexter Stacey	18	16	17	13	14	18	15	12	19	14	15	12	14	1528
11	Joey McColm	13	21	14	27	10	11	12	13	10	30	11	10	18	1522
12	Jason White	15	18	18	26	21	13	18	16	21	11	13	11	22	1450
13	Jeff Lapcevich	3	7		7				5	18	22	8	9	8	1245
14	Derek White **(R)**	7	17	15	31	19	17	17	14	16	15			19	1236
15	Pierre Bourque	6	15	16	18	20	14	13	23	12	29				1137
16	John Gaunt	4		19			7	5		9		9	15		961
17	Andrew Ranger		**2**	9	**1***				**1***		**1***				883
18	Peter Shepherd III	5		11						5		3		1*	810
19	Trevor Seibert		20		6	4	15		11		7				807
20	Shawn McGlynn **(R)**	22	24		19					11	23	16		16	748
21	Peter Klutt		12		9	7			9		25				637
22	Jarrad Whissell		24		16	9			15		13				589
23	Steven Mathews **(R)**	19		12						13				13	486
24	John Farano				17	13			20		10				473
25	Brad Graham				10				17		21			20	454
26	Jason Bowles		3		2						20				433
27	Ron Sheridan	11		13										9	402
28	Howie Scannell Jr.		14		12				27		33				394
29	Robin Buck		22		14						3				383
30	Isabelle Trembay **(R)**				20				21		32			21	370
31	James Van Domselaar				15	12		14							366
32	Donald Chisholm	17											16	11	362
33	Trevor Monaghan **(R)**	23			25									17	294
34	David Thorndyke		DNS		23						17				291
35	Jean-François Dumoulin								7		8				288
36	Louis-Philippe Dumoulin				21				24		24				282
37	Nathan Weenk **(R)**						8	10							276
38	Caitlin Johnston **(R)**		19		28						34				246
39	Todd Nichol					11		16							245
40	Hugo Vannini			20						15					221
41	Kenny Forth **(R)**											18	17		221
42	Kent Nuhn											17		24	203
43	Sharon Harding **(R)**									20				23	197
44	Maryeve Dufault **(R)**								19		26				191
45	Patrice Brisebois **(R)**								28		19				185
46	Gary Klutt **(R)**		11												130
47	Marc-André Cliche **(R)**										12				127
48	Brennan Didero **(R)**	14													121
48	Wayne Smith **(R)**												14		121
50	Michel Pilon **(R)**										16				115
50	Jim White **(R)**						16								115
52	Carl Harr					17									112
53	Daryl Harr					22									97
54	François Bellemare **(R)**								25						88
Pos	Driver	DEL	MSP	STE	TOR	EDM	VER	SAS	CTR	MSP	MON	BAR	RIV	KAW	Pts
	References														

== See also ==
- 2010 NASCAR Sprint Cup Series
- 2010 NASCAR Nationwide Series
- 2010 NASCAR Camping World Truck Series
- 2010 ARCA Racing Series
- 2010 NASCAR Whelen Modified Tour
- 2010 NASCAR Whelen Southern Modified Tour
- 2010 NASCAR Corona Series
- 2010 NASCAR Mini Stock Series
