= 2008 NASCAR Canadian Tire Series =

Seasons
- ← 2007 2009 →

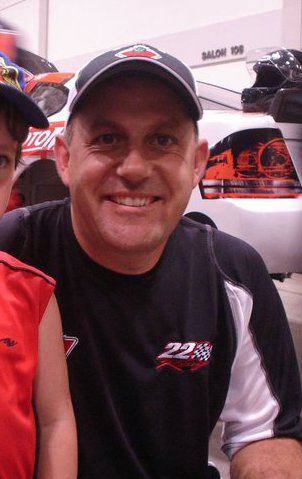
Scott Steckly won his first of four championships.

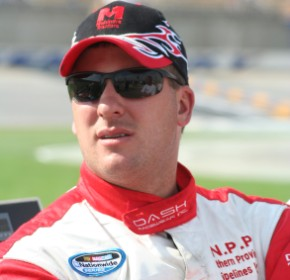
D. J. Kennington finished third in points.

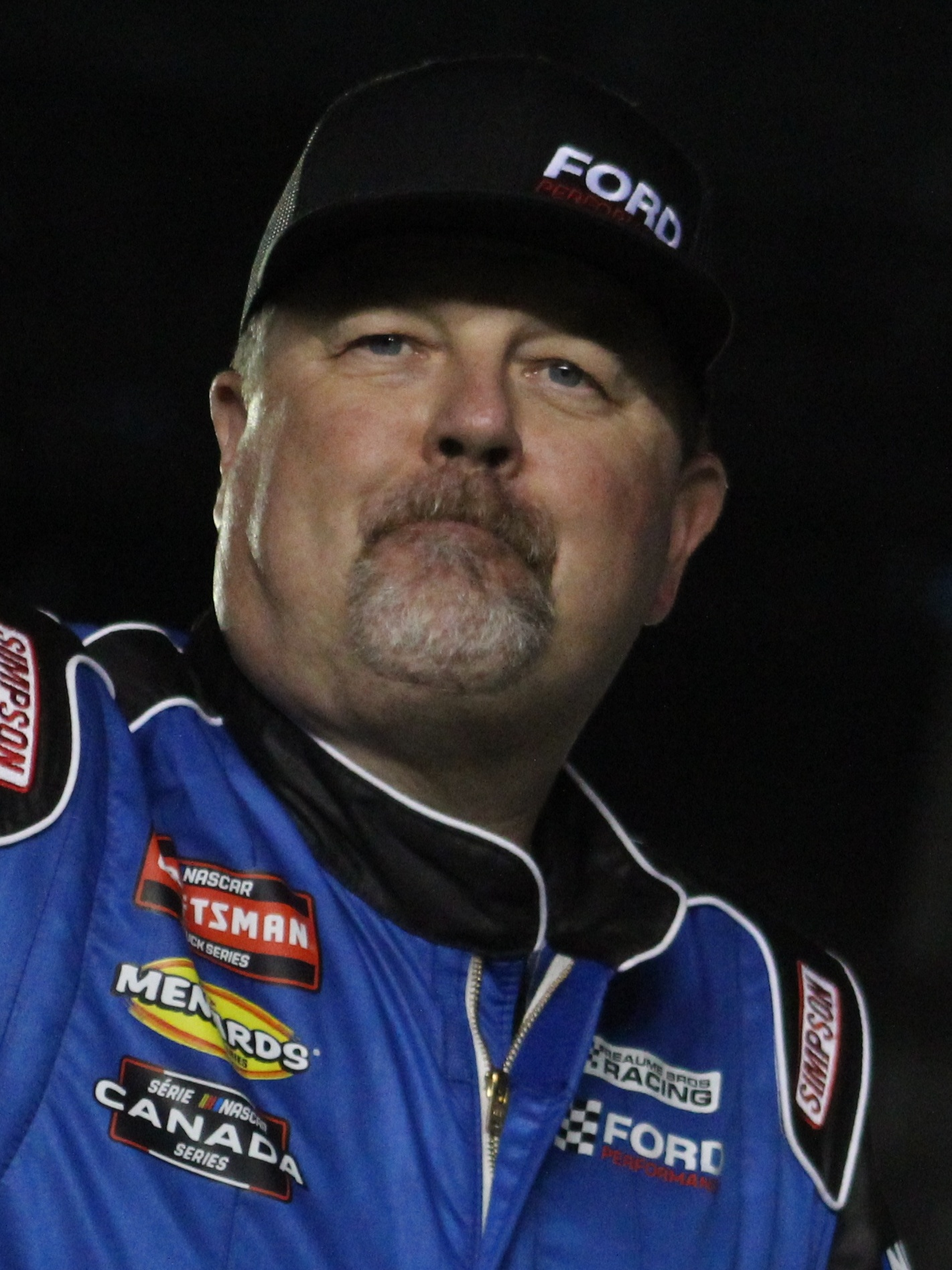
Jason White, the NASCAR Rookie of the Year.

The 2008 NASCAR Canadian Tire Series was the second season of the stock-car racing NASCAR Canada Series. Scott Steckly became the series' second ever champion, winning three of the first four events of the season, and fighting off a late season charge from Don Thomson Jr. to win the championship by 24 points. British Columbia native Jason White was awarded rookie of the year, beating Anthony Simone. It also marked the final season of former CASCAR champion Peter Gibbons, who retired after a lengthy career.

== Schedule ==
Race	Name	Track	Date
1	The Crown Jewel 200	Cayuga International Speedway, Hamilton	May 24
2	Dickies 200 presented by Lucas Oil	Mosport International Raceway, Bowmanville	June 15
3	A&W 300	Barrie Speedway, Barrie	June 28
4	National Kodak 250	Autodrome Saint-Eustache, Saint-Eustache	July 5
5	A&W Crusin' the Dub 300	SunValley Speedway, Vernon	July 19
6	Rexall Edmonton Indy 100	City Centre Airport, Edmonton	July 25
7	NAPA 100	Circuit Gilles Villeneuve, Montreal	August 2
8	Full Throttle Energy Drink 200	Mosport International Raceway, Bowmanville	August 9
9	GP3R 100	Circuit Trois-Rivières, Trois-Rivières	August 17
10	Coke Zero 200 presented by Sicard Holiday Campers	Cayuga International Speedway, Hamilton	August 30
11	Pizza Pizza 300	Barrie Speedway, Barrie	September 6
12	Atlantic Dodge Dealers 300	Riverside Speedway, Antigonish	September 20
13	Dodge Dealers of Ontario 250	Kawartha Speedway, Peterborough	September 27

== Results ==
Race	Event	Pole position	Most laps led	Winning driver	Manufacturer
1	The Crown Jewel 200	Don Thomson Jr.	Scott Steckly	Scott Steckly	Dodge
2	Dickies 200	Scott Steckly	Peter Gibbons	J. R. Fitzpatrick	Chevrolet
3	A&W 300	Don Thomson Jr.	Scott Steckly	Scott Steckly	Dodge
4	National Kodak 250	Don Thomson Jr.	Don Thomson Jr.	Scott Steckly	Dodge
5	A&W Crusin' the Dub 300	Don Thomson Jr.	Don Thomson Jr.	Don Thomson Jr.	Chevrolet
6	Rexall Edmonton Indy	Andrew Ranger	Alex Tagliani	Alex Tagliani	Ford
7	NAPA 100	Kerry Micks	J. R. Fitzpatrick	Andrew Ranger	Ford
8	Full Throttle Energy Drink 200	Scott Steckly*	Scott Steckly	Kerry Micks	Ford
9	GP3R 100	J. R. Fitzpatrick	J. R. Fitzpatrick	Andrew Ranger	Ford
10	Coke Zero 200	Don Thomson Jr.	Mark Dilley	Mark Dilley	Dodge
11	Pizza Pizza 300	Don Thomson Jr.	Don Thomson Jr.	Scott Steckly	Dodge
12	Atlantic Dodge Dealers 300	J. R. Fitzpatrick	J. R. Fitzpatrick	Don Thomson Jr.	Chevrolet
13	Dodge Dealers of Ontario 250	Don Thomson Jr.	Jason Hathaway	Jason Hathaway	Dodge

^{*} – Set by owners points

== Final standings ==
The top 10

Position	Driver	Wins	Poles	Top 5s	Points
1	Scott Steckly	4	1	9	2070
2	Don Thomson Jr.	2	7	8	2046
3	D. J. Kennington	0	0	9	1972
4	Andrew Ranger	2	1	5	1853
5	Kerry Micks	1	1	5	1828
6	Mark Dilley	1	0	6	1819
7	J. R. Fitzpatrick	1	2	5	1813
8	Peter Gibbons	0	0	2	1770
9	Jason Hathaway	1	0	3	1736
10	Brad Graham	0	0	2	1715

== See also ==
- 2008 NASCAR Sprint Cup Series
- 2008 NASCAR Nationwide Series
- 2008 NASCAR Craftsman Truck Series
- 2008 NASCAR Camping World East Series
- 2008 NASCAR Camping World West Series
- 2008 ARCA Re/Max Series
- 2008 NASCAR Whelen Modified Tour
- 2008 NASCAR Whelen Southern Modified Tour
- 2008 NASCAR Corona Series
