= 2008 Coke Zero 200 =

Auto race run at Jukasa Motor Speedway in 2008

Coordinates: 42.935061°N 79.966565°W

2008 Coke Zero 200 Pres. by Sicard Holiday Campers
Race details
- Race 10 of 13 in the 2008 NASCAR Canadian Tire Series season
- Date: August 30, 2008
- Official name: Coke Zero 200
- Location: Cayuga Speedway (Nelles Corners, Haldimand County, Ontario)
- Course: Permanent racing facility
- Course length: 0.625 miles (1.005 km)
- Distance: 203 laps, 126.875 mi (204.186 km)
- Scheduled distance: 200 laps, 125 mi (201.168 km)
- Weather: Start of race: Warm and sunny with temperatures of 26 °C (79 °F); wind speeds of 12.9 kilometres per hour (8.0 mph); End of race: Cold and clear with temperatures of 14 °C (57 °F); wind speeds of 6.3 kilometres per hour (3.9 mph)
- Average speed: 69.552 mph (111.933 km/h)

Pole position
Driver	Don Thomson Jr.	John Fitzpatrick
- Time: 20.902 seconds

Most laps led
Driver	Mark Dilley	Dave Dilley
- Laps: 80

Winner
No. 9	Mark Dilley	Dave Dilley

Television in the United States
- Network: TSN (tape-delayed - shown only in Canada)
- Announcers: Dave Bradley and Billy Rowse Jr. (color commentators); Todd Lewis (pit reporter)

The 2008 Coke Zero 200 Pres. by Sicard Holiday Campers, the second running of the Coke Zero 200, was a NASCAR Canadian Tire Series racing event that was held on August 30, 2008, at Cayuga Speedway (now Jukasa Motor Speedway) in Haldimand County's community of Nelles Corners.

This race is not related to the 2008 Coke Zero 400 Powered by Coca-Cola NASCAR Sprint Cup Series racing event; which took place on July 5, 2008, at Daytona International Speedway in Daytona Beach, Florida.

== Background ==
Cayuga Speedway (now Jukasa Motor Speedway) was opened in 1966 as a dirt track but was paved the following year when the vehicles started to become too dangerous fast for the dirt tracks. It was considered to be one of Canada's premier racing facilities. It is a 5/8-mile (1.0 km) oval similar in size to Martinsville Speedway. The track has held a variety of different racing groups including CASCAR, NASCAR Canadian Tire Series, the American-Canadian Tour, NASCAR Busch North, Hooters Pro-Cup, USAC, ISMA Supermodifieds, DIRT Modifieds and the ARCA RE/MAX Series (which is considered to be one of the developmental milestones to the Monster Energy NASCAR Cup Series. Set on 300 acres (1.2 km^{2}) of land, Cayuga offers campgrounds with electricity, concession booths, and free parking.

On June 8, 2006, a group of developers from Toronto purchased the 5/8-mile (1.0 km) track from its original owners and made improvements for the 2007 season, hoping to attract NASCAR Nationwide Series (now called the Xfinity Series) to have a race at Cayuga Speedway. Instead, the race went to Montreal's Circuit Gilles Villeneuve due to its larger population and recognition in the international community. Cooper Construction of Oakville was announced as the vendor to re-build the track. Cayuga Speedway hosted the first NASCAR Canadian Tire Series race in series history on May 26, 2007.

== Race report ==
=== Qualifying ===
Don Thomson Jr. would clinch the pole position for this race by driving up to 107.645 miles per hour (173.238 km/h) during the same-day qualifying sessions. Time trials began at 5:15 PM and they were finished just before the green flag start at 7:35 PM.

John Fletcher would be the slowest driver during qualifying; making a lap in over 22 seconds. Jason Hathaway would qualify on a provisional. Lap times of approximately 20–21 seconds were considered to be standard qualifying times for the drivers.

Grid	No.	Driver	Manufacturer	Speed	Qualifying time	Owner
1	4	Don Thomson Jr.	Chevrolet	107.645	20.902	John Fitzpatrick
2	22	Scott Steckly	Dodge	107.128	21.003	Scott Steckly
3	17	D. J. Kennington	Dodge	107.015	21.025	Doug Kennington
4	1	Peter Gibbons	Chevrolet	106.975	21.033	Peter Gibbons
5	02	Kerry Micks	Ford	106.802	21.067	Susan Micks
6	84	J. R. Fitzpatrick	Chevrolet	106.772	21.073	John Fitzpatrick
7	60	Ron Beauchamp Jr.	Dodge	106.453	21.136	Ron Beauchamp Sr.
8	9	Mark Dilley	Dodge	106.378	21.151	Dave Dilley
9	77	Derek Lynch	Dodge	106.172	21.192	Harvey Ambrose
10	27	Andrew Ranger	Ford	105.639	21.299	Dave Jacombs

Prior to the race, a pre-race invocation was given which was followed by the singing of the American and Canadian national anthems.

=== Race ===
There were 22 drivers on the grid; all of them were born in Canada. Out of this 203-lap event, about 23% of this event was held under a caution flag while the average green flag run was 20 laps. Anthony Simone would be credited as the last-place finisher due to problems with his suspension on the fourth lap. He would commit a false start violation and be black flagged. However, Thomson Jr. was not disqualified and went on to continue the race. Whitlock was black flagged for dumping Nuhn; causing people who were in attendance at the race to doubt the professionalism of both the drivers and the NASCAR officials who were in charge of the race. Steckly suffered mechanical issues after getting spun by Kennington while battling for the lead early on. This would cause him to finish well behind John Fletcher in 18th place, even though he had still had commanding lead for the NASCAR Canadian Tire Series championship after the race.

At lap 81, the lights from turn 1 all the way to turn 4 went out leaving only the front stretch lights on.

The average speed of the race was 69.552 miles per hour (111.933 km/h) and the event lasted for one hour and forty-nine minutes; not counting the 165-minute delay that occurred due to the instability of the racing lights. Mark Dilley would defeat Andrew Ranger by nearly three-quarters of a second in front of an undisclosed number of spectators. A problem with their electricity generator caused a 10-lap caution with all the cars forced to stop where they were. At the end of the race, 12 cars made up the lead lap. Most of the field were driving vehicles that were affiliated with either the Chevrolet or Dodge manufacturer.

Notable crew chiefs for this race were Thatcher Krupp, Ted McAlister, Scott Fletcher, Warren Jones, Bill Burns, Greg Gibson, Brian Uptigrove, Mike Knott, Hugh Nunh, David Wight, Don Jacobson, Kelly Hallett, Rino Montanari, Alex Nagy, Sandy Hamilton, Guijio Montanari, Terry Wilson, and David Hernen.

Major sponsors for the drivers on the starting grid include Wal-Mart, Tim Hortons, Home Hardware, Interstate Batteries, and Ubisoft. Individual driver winnings for this event ranged from $8,200 for the winner ($11,801 when adjusted for inflation) all the way to a meager $980 for the last-place finisher ($1,410 when adjusted for inflation). Due to the small qualifying grid typically found at NASCAR Canadian Tire Series racing events, everyone qualified for this racing event. Although the price of gas was recorded at nearly $1.30/litre ($5.20/gallon) just prior to race day for some of the busier gas stations, those who could afford to go to the race greatly appreciated the race prior to the lengthy blackout.

Due to the mostly regional atmosphere of the NASCAR Canadian Tire Series, this race was never aired in any other country besides Canada.

=== Finishing order ===
Pos	No.	Driver	Manufacturer	Laps	Laps led	Time/Status
1	9	Mark Dilley	Dodge	203	80	1:49:27 (Note: This race time does not take into factor a 115-minute power outage)
2	27	Andrew Ranger	Ford	203	0	Lead lap under green flag
3	77	Derek Lynch	Dodge	203	0	Lead lap under green flag
4	3	Jason Hathaway	Dodge	203	0	Lead lap under green flag
5	60	Ron Beauchamp Jr.	Dodge	203	51	Lead lap under green flag
6	25	Jim Lapecvich	Chevrolet	203	0	Lead lap under green flag
7	4	Don Thompson Jr.	Chevrolet	203	2	Lead lap under green flag
8	39	Dave Whitlock	Dodge	203	0	Lead lap under green flag
9	1	Peter Gibbons	Chevrolet	203	0	Lead lap under green flag
10	17	D. J. Kennington	Plymouth	203	33	Lead lap under green flag
11	18	Kent Nuhn	Chevrolet	203	3	Lead lap under green flag
12	84	J. R. Fitzpatrick	Chevrolet	203	0	Lead lap under green flag
13	02	Kerry Micks	Ford	202	33	+1 lap
14	12	John Gaunt	Dodge	202	0	+1 lap
15	21	Jason White	Chevrolet	202	0	+1 lap
16	7	Peter Shepherd	Ford	202	0	+1 lap
17	49	John Fletcher	Dodge	195	0	+8 laps
18	22	Scott Steckly	Dodge	193	1	+10 laps
19	19	Brad Graham	Dodge	176	0	+27 laps
20	13	Nik Lapcevich	Chevrolet	165	0	+43 laps
21	10	Doug Brown	Dodge	54	0	Ring gear problems
22	95	Anthony Simone	Chevrolet	4	0	Suspension problems

== Timeline ==
Section reference:

- Start of race: Don Thomson Jr. started the race with the pole position.
- Lap 3: D. J. Kennington took over the lead from Don Thomson Jr.
- Lap 4: Anthony Simone had problems with his suspension; causing him to withdraw from the event.
- Lap 5-12: Jason Hathaway and Kent Nuhn crashed into each other, causing the race's first caution flag.
- Lap 13: Scott Steckly took over the lead from D. J. Kennington.
- Lap 14: D. J. Kennington took over the lead from Scott Steckly.
- Lap 24: Kerry Micks took over the lead from D. J. Kennington.
- Lap 50-54: Jason White would spin hazardously into turn three, bringing out the second caution flag.
- Lap 54: Doug Brown's vehicle had an issue with his ring gear, forcing him to leave the race.
- Lap 57: D. J. Kennington took over the lead from Kerry Micks.
- Lap 70: Mark Dilley took over the lead from D. J. Kennington.
- Lap 81-91: Lighting failure at the track caused the third caution flag.
- Lap 95-97: Kent Nuhn spun dangerously into turn three; causing the fourth caution flag.
- Lap 137: Ron Beauchamp Jr. took over the lead from Mark Dilley.
- Lap 162-166: D. J. Kennington would spin unsafely into turn four, causing the fifth caution of the race.
- Lap 163: Mark Dilley took over the lead from Ron Beauchamp Jr.
- Lap 164: Kent Nuhn took over the lead from Mark Dilley.
- Lap 167: Ron Beauchamp Jr. took over the lead from Mark Dilley.
- Lap 184-191: Kerry Micks performed a hazardous spin into turn four, causing the sixth caution of the event.
- Lap 192: Mark Dilley took over the lead from Ron Beauchamp Jr.
- Lap 196-201: John Gaunt caused the final caution of the race by stopping dangerously into turn four, making the race go into overtime.
- Finish: Mark Dilley won the race.

== Standings after the race ==
Pos	Driver	Points	Differential
1	Scott Steckly	1639	0
2 ▲	Andrew Ranger	1571	-68
3 ▼	D. J. Kennington	1551	-88
4	Don Thomson Jr.	1526	-113
5	Kerry Micks	1459	-180
6 ▲	Mark Dilley	1405	-234
7	Peter Gibbons	1379	-260
8 ▼	J. R. Fitzpatrick	1377	-262
9 ▲	Derek Lynch	1314	-325
10 ▲	Jason Hathaway	1301	-338

== Notes ==
Preceded by 2008 GP3R 100	NASCAR Canadian Tire Series season 2008	Succeeded by 2008 Pizza Pizza 300
