= 2013 NASCAR Canadian Tire Series =

2013 NASCAR Canadian Tire Series season
- NASCAR Canada Series

Season
- Races: 12
- Start date: May 19
- End date: September 22

Awards
- Champion: Scott Steckly

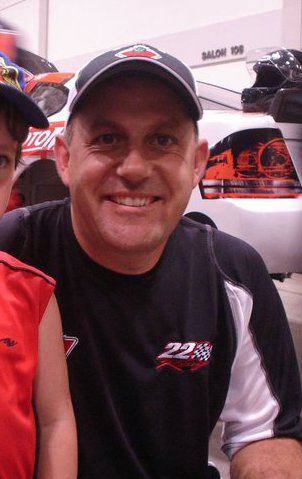
Scott Steckly, the 2013 Canadian NASCAR champion.

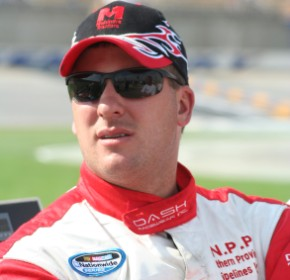
D. J. Kennington finished second by two points.

The 2013 NASCAR Canadian Tire Series was the seventh season of the NASCAR Canadian Tire Series that took place in the summer of 2013. The season was composed of 12 races at 10 different venues where seven of those events were contested on oval courses.

== Summary ==
The seventh season consisted of 12 dates at 11 different tracks, which spans across five provinces. Television rights were once again licensed to TSN in one-hour tape-delayed episodes, excluding both events at the Canadian Tire Motorsport Park road course which was aired live on TSN and CTV.

The season started on May 19 at the newly renovated Canadian Tire Motorsport Park with Louis-Philippe Dumoulin collecting his first series win with longtime veteran Jeff Lapcevich finishing second. After a two-year hiatus, the series returned to the Autodrome St. Eustache on 27 July as the events in Montreal and Edmonton Airport did not return the calendar.

== Drivers ==
Number	Driver	Maker	Owner	Crew Chief
02	Kerry Micks	Ford	Susan Micks	Tyler Case
02	Mark Dilley	Ford	Susan Micks	Rino Montanari
03	Elie Arseneau	Chevrolet	Jason Roussakis	TBA
3	Jason Hathaway	Dodge	Ed Hakonson	Craig Masters
4	Ty Dillon	Chevrolet	John Fitzpatrick	Ted McAlister
04	Jean-François Dumoulin	Dodge	Paul Corbeil	Tony Pratte
5	Noel Dowler	Dodge	Kevin Dowler	Bud Roy
07	Isabelle Tremblay	Ford	Dave Jacombs	TBA
7	Peter Shepherd III	Dodge	Sharon Shepherd	Don Jacobson
09	Ryley Seibert	Dodge	Trevor Seibert	Kennan Magnant
15	Steven Mathews	Ford	Bill Mathews	Rick McColl
17	D. J. Kennington	Dodge	Doug Kennington	Dave Wight
19	Brad Graham	Dodge	Reg Arsenault	Bill Dobson
21	Jason White	Dodge	Melissa Mckenzie	Derek Lynch
22	Scott Steckly	Dodge	Scott Steckly	Giulio Montanari
27	Andrew Ranger	Dodge	Dave Jacombs	TBA
28	Daniel Bois	Dodge	D. J. Kennington	Bill Burns
29	Ray Courtemanche Jr.	Dodge	Ray Courtemanche Jr.	Tim Ellas
36	Alex Labbé	Dodge	Ghislain Labbé	Stephane Therrien
42	Peter Klutt	Chevrolet	Peter Klutt	Ken Stewart
44	Jarrad Whissell	Ford	Brian Whissell	Donald Barhardt
47	Louis-Philippe Dumoulin	Dodge	Marc-Andre Bergeron	Jimmy Briere
50	Joey McColm	Dodge	John Atto	TBA
55	Dexter Stacey	Dodge	Kristin Hamelin	TBA
56	Howie Scannell Jr.	Dodge	James Bray	Kevin Blacklock
60	Ron Beauchamp Jr.	Dodge	Ronald Beauchamp Sr.	Deon Deneau
66	Robin Buck	Dodge	Sandra D'Angelo	Randy Gray
69	Trevor Seibert	Dodge	Trevor Seibert	Al Lebert
76	Jeff Lapcevich	Dodge	Joe Lapcevich	Chris Couvillon
81	Larry Jackson	Dodge	Brian Barton	TBA
82	Dave Connelly	Dodge	David Connelly	Mike Kenyon
84	J. R. Fitzpatrick	Chevrolet	John Fitzpatrick	Don Thomson Jr.
89	Donald Chisholm	Ford	John Chisholm	George Koszkulics
90	Martin Roy	Dodge	Normand Roy	Mario Gosselin
94	Dave Coursol	Dodge	Andre Coursol	TBA
97	Hugo Vannini	Ford	Yvon Vannini	Yvon Vannini
99	Derek White	Chevrolet	Derek White	Jonathan Cote

== Schedule ==
Race	Name	Track	Date
1	Vortex Brake Pads 200	Canadian Tire Motorsport Park, Bowmanville	May 19
2	EMCO 200	Delaware Speedway, Delaware	June 15
3	Clarington 200	Canadian Tire Motorsport Park, Bowmanville	June 22
4	Jiffy Lube 100 presented by Snap-On	Circuit ICAR, Mirabel	July 7
5	A&W Crusin' the Dub 300	Motoplex Speedway, Vernon	July 13
6	Velocity Prairie Thunder presented by Bayer CropScience	Auto Clearing Motor Speedway, Saskatoon	July 17
7	National 250 presented by Public Mobile	Autodrome St. Eustache, St. Eustache	July 27
8	JuliaWine.com 100	Circuit Trois-Rivières, Trois-Rivières	August 11
9	Wilson Equipment 300	Riverside Speedway, Antigonish	August 17
10	Pinty's presents the Clarington 200	Canadian Tire Motorsport Park, Bowmanville	September 1
11	Hudco Electric Supply 300	Barrie Speedway, Barrie	September 8
12	Pinty's 250	Kawartha Speedway, Peterborough	September 22

== Results ==
=== Races ===
Race	Name	Pole position	Most laps led	Winning driver	Manufacturer
1	Vortex Brake Pads 200	J. R. Fitzpatrick	Louis-Philippe Dumoulin	Louis-Philippe Dumoulin	Dodge
2	EMCO 200	Scott Steckly	Peter Shepherd III	Peter Shepherd III	Dodge
3	Clarington 200	Kerry Micks	Kerry Micks	Peter Shepherd III	Dodge
4	Jiffy Lube 100 presented by Snap-On	Andrew Ranger	Andrew Ranger	Andrew Ranger	Dodge
5	A&W Crusin' the Dub 300	J. R. Fitzpatrick	Scott Steckly	Scott Steckly	Dodge
6	Velocity Prairie Thunder presented by Bayer CropScience	J. R. Fitzpatrick	J. R. Fitzpatrick	Scott Steckly	Dodge
7	National 250 presented by Public Mobile	Ron Beauchamp Jr.	Scott Steckly	Scott Steckly	Dodge
8	JuliaWine.com 100	Alex Tagliani	Jacques Villeneuve	D. J. Kennington	Dodge
9	Wilson Equipment 300	Scott Steckly	Scott Steckly	Jason Hathaway	Dodge
10	Pinty's presents the Clarington 200	Jeff Lapcevich	Jeff Lapcevich	Louis-Philippe Dumoulin	Dodge
11	Hudco Electric Supply 300	Scott Steckly	Jason Hathaway	Jason Hathaway	Dodge
12	Pinty's 250	Scott Steckly	Scott Steckly	Scott Steckly	Dodge

=== Championship standings ===
Pos.	Driver	Races												Points
Pos.	Driver	MSP	DEL	MSP	ICAR	VER	SAS	STE	CTR	RIS	MSP	BAR	KAW	Points
1	Scott Steckly	24	**21**	2	2	1*	1	1*	8	**3***	11	**4**	**1***	473
2	D. J. Kennington	4	4	10	6	9	4	16	1	2	4	2	4	471
3	Jason Hathaway	3	11	4	20	2	3	14	4	1	25	1*	11	442
4	Martin Roy	20	5	6	9	11	20	7	6	5	2	6	5	429
5	Louis-Philippe Dumoulin	1*	19	7	3	5	12	6	14	17	1	16	21	418
6	J. R. Fitzpatrick	**27**	2	3	4	**19**	**7***	3	13	16	5	3	25	411
7	Noel Dowler	8	6	16	18	20	6	10	16	8	19	17	6	378
8	Jason White	15	14	11	14	13	15	5	11	14	17	13	12	375
9	Ron Beauchamp Jr.	16	13	18	15	6	8	**4**	18	15	26	9	9	373
10	Alex Guenette **(R)**	26	20	17	10	10	11	2	20	6	18	5	17	368
11	Ryley Seibert **(R)**	11	17	12	12	8	18	15	15	11	33	7	10	359
12	Ray Courtemanche Jr.	12	15	15	17	16	19	13	19	12	28	11	22	329
13	Trevor Seibert	9	18	21	22	14	5	8	10	10	35			289
14	Larry Jackson	22	7	20	23	12	16	18		13	24	15	26	288
15	Hugo Vannini	13	8	9	24			11	22	9	29	18	19	278
16	Jeff Lapcevich	2	12	8	5				9		**8***		3	265
17	Kerry Micks	6		**19***	7	21	21	17	27		16			220
18	Mark Dilley		22			4	2			4		8	8	218
19	Peter Shepherd III		1*	1								19	2	163
20	Howie Scannell Jr.	21			13			19	25	9		14		163
21	Joey McColm	25	10								21	10	16	138
22	Dave Connelly		9	13				9				12		133
23	Andrew Ranger				**1***				2		3			131
24	Steve Mathews	18	3	5							27			124
25	Brad Graham	10	16								20		13	118
26	Jim White					3	13						15	101
27	Jean-François Dumoulin				8				17		15			92
28	James Van Domselaar					15	10				23			84
29	Donald Chisholm									7			7	75
30	Robin Buck	5									10			73
31	Cameron Hayley					7	9							73
32	Alex Labbé				11				7					70
33	Derek White	28			16								20	68
34	Paul Jean							12	24		30			66
35	Kelly Admiraal					17	14							57
36	Peter Klutt	19									14			55
36	Marc-Antoine Camirand								29		6			54
38	Brandon White **(R)**			14	21									53
39	Nick Jewell					18	17							53
40	David Thorndyke	14									22			52
41	Daniel Bois **(R)**	23											14	51
42	Ty Dillon	7									32			49
43	Jacques Villeneuve								3*					43
44	Jason Hankewich					DNQ^{1}							24	42
45	Alex Tagliani								**5**					40
46	Gary Klutt										7			37
47	Matthew Scannell										34		18	36
48	Patrice Brisebois								12					32
49	Jeb Burton										12			32
50	Chad Hackenbracht										13			31
51	Ryan Klutt **(R)**	17												27
52	Elie Arseneau				19									25
53	Isabelle Tremblay								21					23
54	Xavier Coupal								23					21
55	Trevor Monaghan												23	21
56	Benoit Theetge								26					18
57	Dexter Stacey								28					16
58	Simon Dion-Viens								30					14
59	James Buescher										31			13
60	Curtis Fielding										36			8
Pos.	Driver	MSP	DEL	MSP	ICAR	VER	SAS	STE	CTR	RIS	MSP	BAR	KAW	Points
Pos.	Driver	Races												Points

Key
Color	Result
Gold	Winner
Silver	Finished 2nd–5th
Bronze	Finished 6th–10th
Green	Finished 11th–20th
Blue	Finished 21st or worse
Purple	Did not finish (DNF)
Black	Disqualified (DSQ)
Red	Did not qualify (DNQ)
Tan	Withdrew From Race (Wth)
White	Qualified for another driver (QL)
White	Qualified but replaced due to injury or incident (INQ)
White	Relieved another driver (RL)
Blank	Did not participate (DNP)
Blank	Excluded (EX)
Blank	Did not arrive (DNA)

**Bold** – Pole position awarded by time.
Italics – Pole position earned by points standings.
* – Most laps led.

Notes

- ^{1} – Jason Hankewich received championship points, despite the fact that he did not qualify for the race.

== See also ==
- 2013 NASCAR Sprint Cup Series
- 2013 NASCAR Nationwide Series
- 2013 NASCAR Camping World Truck Series
- 2013 NASCAR K&N Pro Series East
- 2013 NASCAR K&N Pro Series West
- 2013 NASCAR Whelen Modified Tour
- 2013 NASCAR Whelen Southern Modified Tour
- 2013 ARCA Racing Series
- 2013 NASCAR Toyota Series
- 2013 NASCAR Whelen Euro Series
