= 2007 NASCAR Canadian Tire Series =

Seasons
- ← none 2008 →

The 2007 NASCAR Canadian Tire Series was the inaugural season for the NASCAR Canadian Tire Series with the first event being held on May 26, 2007 at Cayuga Motor Speedway and Don Thomson Jr. won in a spirited battle for the first series win. Andrew Ranger, in his first year of stock-car competition, won the second race at Mosport International Raceway. He took over the lead in the point standings after that event and never relinquished it on his way to the first championship. The first season saw no less than five races decided on last lap passes.

== Schedule ==
Race	Name	Track	Date
1	Dodge Dealers 200	Cayuga International Speedway, Hamilton	May 26
2	Dickies 200 presented by Canadian Shield	Mosport International Raceway, Bowmanville	June 17
3	Mopar 300	Barrie Speedway, Barrie	July 1
4	BC Dodge Dealers Dodge Avenger 300	SunValley Speedway, Vernon	July 15
5	Rexall Grand Prix of Edmonton	City Centre Airport, Edmonton	July 21
6	NAPA Autopro 100	Circuit Gilles Villeneuve, Montreal	August 4
7	Full Throttle Energy Drink 200	Mosport International Raceway, Bowmanville	August 11
8	GP3R 100	Circuit Trois-Rivières, Trois-Rivières	August 19
9	Subway 200	Cayuga International Speedway, Hamilton	September 1
10	ATTO 200	Barrie Speedway, Barrie	September 8
11	Atlantic Dodge Dealers 300	Riverside Speedway, Antigonish	September 15
12	Dodge Dealers of Ontario Dodge Charger 250	Kawartha Speedway, Peterborough	September 23

== Results ==
Race	Name	Pole position	Most laps led	Winning driver	Manufacturer
1	Dodge Dealers 200	D. J. Kennington	Don Thomson Jr.	Don Thomson Jr.	Chevrolet
2	Dickies 200 presented by Canadian Shield	Andrew Ranger	J. R. Fitzpatrick	Andrew Ranger	Ford
3	Mopar 300	Mark Dilley	D. J. Kennington	D. J. Kennington	Dodge
4	BC Dodge Dealers Dodge Avenger 300	Don Thomson Jr.	Scott Steckly	J. R. Fitzpatrick	Chevrolet
5	Rexall Grand Prix of Edmonton	Andrew Ranger	Andrew Ranger	J. R. Fitzpatrick	Chevrolet
6	NAPA Autopro 100	J. R. Fitzpatrick	Kerry Micks	Kerry Micks	Ford
7	Full Throttle Energy Drink 200	J. R. Fitzpatrick	Don Thomson Jr.	Don Thomson Jr.	Chevrolet
8	GP3R 100	J. R. Fitzpatrick	Kerry Micks	Kerry Micks	Ford
9	Subway 200	Don Thomson Jr.	Andrew Ranger	Derek Lynch	Dodge
10	ATTO 300	Kerry Micks	Peter Gibbons	D. J. Kennington	Dodge
11	Atlantic Dodge Dealers 300	Peter Gibbons	Peter Gibbons	Mark Dilley	Dodge
12	Dodge Dealers of Ontario Dodge Charger 250	Mark Dilley	Don Thomson Jr.	Scott Steckly	Dodge

== Standings ==
The top 10

Position	Driver	Wins	Poles	Top 5s	Points
1	Andrew Ranger	1	2	7	1896
2	D. J. Kennington	2	1	8	1793
3	Peter Gibbons	0	1	8	1770
4	Don Thomson Jr.	2	2	5	1739
5	Derek Lynch	1	0	5	1713
6	J. R. Fitzpatrick	2	3	4	1710
7	Kerry Micks	2	1	6	1696
8	Mark Dilley	1	2	4	1688
9	Jason Hathaway	0	0	1	1631
10	Scott Steckly	1	0	7	1630

== See also ==
- 2007 NASCAR Nextel Cup Series
- 2007 NASCAR Busch Series
- 2007 NASCAR Craftsman Truck Series
- 2007 NASCAR Busch East Series
- 2007 ARCA Re/Max Series
- 2007 NASCAR Whelen Modified Tour
- 2007 NASCAR Whelen Southern Modified Tour
- 2007 NASCAR Corona Series
