= Barrie Speedway =

Racetrack in Ontario USA

"Get Your Heart Racing"
- Location: 240 8 Line South, Oro, Ontario, Canada
- Coordinates: 44°28′37″N 79°30′54″W
- Capacity: 4000
- Broke ground: 1965
- Opened: 1965
- Closed: January 2015; 11 years ago
- Construction cost: $2 million-dollar upgrade 2004
- Major events: NASCAR Canadian Tire Series; Hudco Electric Supply 300 (2007–2014); NASCAR Whelen All-American Series (2007–2014); CASCAR Super Series (1989–1995, 2005–2006)
- Website: http://www.barriespeedway.com/home

Tri-Oval (1965–2015)
- Surface: Asphalt
- Length: 0.538 km (0.334 mi)
- Turns: 4
- Banking: Progressive

Barrie Speedway was a 0.333 km (0.207 mi) tri-oval racing track located in Oro-Medonte, Ontario, Canada, north of Barrie. It was a member of CASCAR Super Series between 1989 and 1995, the NASCAR Whelen All-American Series for the Ontario Provincial and National (Continental) championships between 2007 and 2014, and also hosted a NASCAR Canadian Tire Series 10 races between 2007 and 2014.

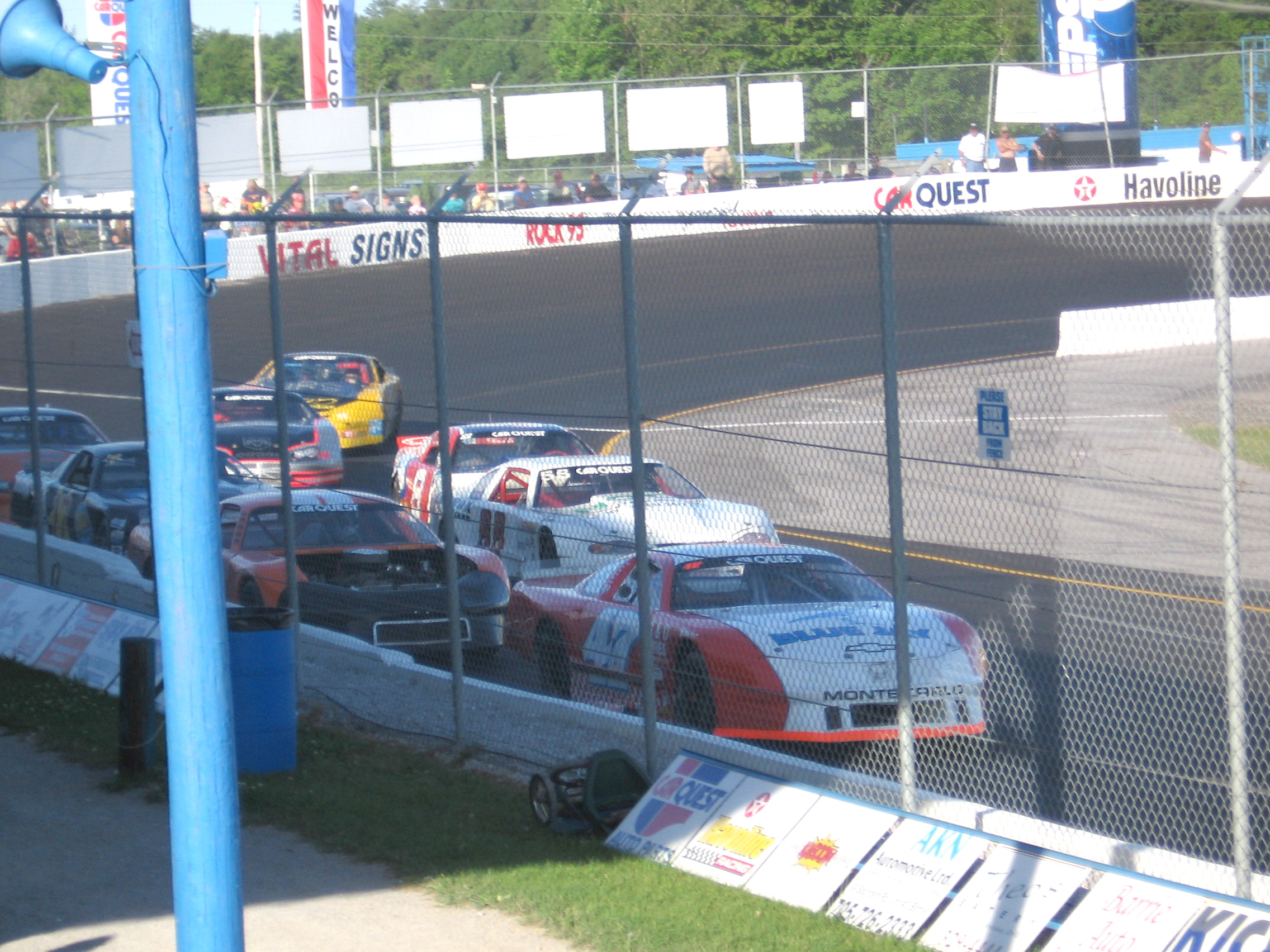
Late Models racing at Barrie Speedway, Ontario, Canada in 2007

Past winners of the NCTS races:

- 2007 D. J. Kennington and D. J. Kennington (2)
- 2008 Scott Steckly and Scott Steckly (2)
- 2009 Don Thomson Jr.
- 2010 D. J. Kennington (3)
- 2011 Mark Dilley
- 2012 Pete Sheperd III
- 2013 Jason Hathaway
- 2014 Jason Hathaway (2)

Barrie had three home divisions; Late Models, Thunder Cars and Pure Stocks. Other touring series were hosted throughout the season, including the NASCAR Canadian Tire Series, Ontario Legends Series, TQ midgets, and OSCAAR.

The track underwent major upgrades in 2004 which included upgrades to seating, pits and a full resurfacing and partial reconfiguration of the racing surface into its short track tri-oval it had up to its demolition.

== List of track champions by year and division ==
- 2014 Late Model Gord Shepard, Thunder Car Luke Ginac
- 2013 Late Model Gord Shepard, Thunder Car Rick Walt Pure Stock Mike Gettliffe
- 2012 Late Model Dwayne Baker Thunder Car Rick Walt ure Stock Charlie Smith
- 2011 Late Model Ron Quesnelle Thunder Car Jim Beleskey Pure Stock Shawn Murray
- 2010 Late Model Alan Inglis Thunder Car Jim Beleskey Pure Stock William Davies
- 2009 Late Model Gord Shepard Thunder Car Darryl St. Onge Pure Stock Ben Melenhorst
- 2008 Late Model Keith Mcleod Thunder Car Frank Davey Pure Stock Brandon Crumbie, Charger Billy Melenhorst
- 2007 Late Model Dwayne Baker
- 2006 Late Model John Gaunt
- 2005 Late Model Tom Walters
- 2004 Late Model Tom Walters
- 2003 Late Model Steve Quesnelle
- 2002 Late Model Glen Watson Thunder Car Robin Jongen 4Cyl
- 2001 Late Model Don Hawn Thunder Car
- 2000 Sportsman Challenger Glen Watson Thunder Car
- 1999 Sportsman Challenger Don Hawn Thunder Car Emerson Ward
- 199? to 1998 Not In Operation
- 1997 Thunder Car Dan Lazin
- 1965

== Closure and demolition ==
Although Barrie Speedway was a very prominent venue, it was said that the number of both spectators and racers regularly in attendance was beginning to decline. In 2011, APEX Motorsports purchased the venue with the intentions of reviving its potential. In 2014, Contrans Group Inc., whose CEO is a major shareholder of an entertainment company by the name of Republic Live, had purchased a property (Burl's Creek Event Grounds) adjacent to Barrie Speedway. In January 2015, after months of rumours and speculation, Barrie Speedway was sold to Contrans Group Inc, which would seal the fate of the racetrack. Demolition of Barrie Speedway began in late 2015; very little remained of the racetrack as of spring 2016.
