= Jason Hathaway =

Canadian racing driver (born 1976)

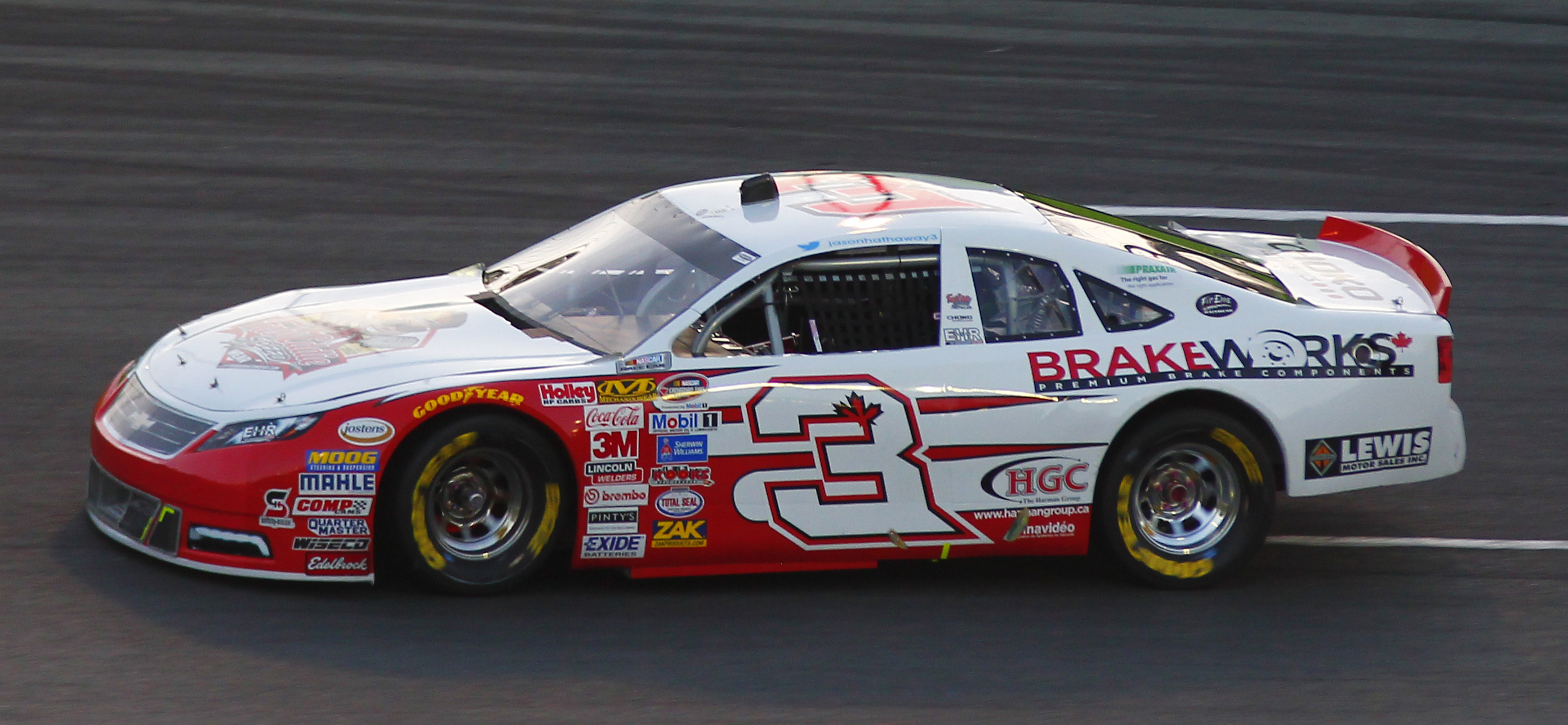
- Hathaway at Autodrome Chaudière in 2015
- Born: November 22, 1976 (age 50); Appin, Ontario, Canada

NASCAR FedEx Freight Truck Series career
- 2 races run over 1 year
- 2017 position: 41st
- First race: 2017 Chevrolet Silverado 250 (Mosport)
- Last race: 2017 Lucas Oil 150 (Phoenix)
Wins	Top tens	Poles
0	0	0

NASCAR Canada Series career
- 160 races run over 15 years
- 2025 position: 17th
- Best finish: 1st (2020)
- First race: 2007 Dodge Dealers 200 (Cayuga)
- Last race: 2025 Leland Industries 250 (Saskatoon)
- First win: 2008 Dodge Dealers of Toronto 250 (Kawartha)
- Last win: 2020 Motomaster 125 (Jukasa)
Wins	Top tens	Poles
14	101	0
- Statistics up to date as of October 23, 2025.

Jason Hathaway (born November 22, 1976) is a Canadian professional stock car racing driver and team owner. He last competed part-time in the NASCAR Canada Series, driving Ed Hakonson Racing's No. 3 Chevrolet entry, and is the 2020 champion of the series. He has also competed in the NASCAR Camping World Truck Series and NASCAR K&N Pro Series East.

== Racing career ==
=== NASCAR Camping World Truck Series ===
In 2017, Hathaway made his Truck Series debut at Mosport, driving the No. 66 Chevrolet Silverado for Bolen Motorsports. He started twenty-second and finished fifteenth.

Hathaway returned to the series for the Phoenix race. He drove the No. 15 Chevrolet Silverado for Premium Motorsports instead and finished eleventh after starting 23rd.

=== NASCAR Canada Series ===
Hathaway began racing in the Canadian Tire Series in 2007, driving the No. 3 of Team 3 Red Racing owned by Ed Hakonson.

In 2016, Hathaway announced his retirement from full time competition in the Pinty's Series after 121 races ran over twelve seasons.

In 2019, Hathaway announced his intentions to return to racing full-time in the Pinty's Series, driving Team 3 Red's No. 3 Chevrolet Camaro.

In the abbreviated 2020 season, Hathaway won three of the tour's six races en route to winning the championship.

After becoming the general manager for Ed Hakonson Racing and the crew chief of their No. 3 post-2020, Hathaway returned to the NASCAR Canada Series for the team in 2024. He would score a season best second place finish in both races at Riverside International Speedway and finish sixth in the standings.

Hathaway would run select races in 2025, starting at Canadian Tire Motorsport Park. After competing in the opening four races of the season, Hathaway stepped aside from driving the No. 3 and a rotation of drivers drove the entry for the remainder of the year. In his final start at Sutherland Automotive Speedway, he would finish second.

In May 2026, it was announced that Jason and his wife Jamie Hakonson-Hathaway had taken over ownership of Team 3 Red/Ed Hakonson Racing, with Jason as the owner of the No. 3 and Jamie as the owner of the No. 8.

== Motorsports career results ==
=== NASCAR ===
(key) (Bold – Pole position awarded by qualifying time. Italics – Pole position earned by points standings or practice time. * – Most laps led.)

==== Camping World Truck Series ====
NASCAR Camping World Truck Series results
Year	Team	No.	Make	1	2	3	4	5	6	7	8	9	10	11	12	13	14	15	16	17	18	19	20	21	22	23	NCWTC	Pts	Ref
2017	Bolen Motorsports	66	Chevy	DAY	ATL	MAR	KAN	CLT	DOV	TEX	GTW	IOW	KEN	ELD	POC	MCH	BRI	MSP; 15	CHI	NHA	LVS	TAL	MAR	TEX			41st	52	
2017	Premium Motorsports	15	Chevy																						PHO; 11	HOM	41st	52	

==== Canada Series ====
NASCAR Canada Series results
Year	Team	No.	Make	1	2	3	4	5	6	7	8	9	10	11	12	13	NCSC	Pts	Ref
2007	Team 3 Red Racing	3	Chevy	HAM; 5	MSP; 15	BAR; 16	MPS; 7	EDM; 10	CGV; 20	MSP; 4	CTR; 9	HAM; 9	BAR; 8	RIS; 7	KWA; 11		9th	1631	
2008	Team 3 Red Racing	3	Chevy	HAM; 14	MSP; 13	BAR; 13	ASE; 13	MPS; 16	EDM; 7	CGV; 28	MSP; 9	CTR; 3	HAM; 4	BAR; 16	RIS; 11	KWA; 1*	9th	1736	
2009	Team 3 Red Racing	3	Chevy	ASE; 8	DEL; 20	MSP; 8	ASE; 8	MPS; 8	EDM; 7	SAS; 4	MSP; 9	CTR; 16	CGV; 13	BAR; 5	RIS; 6	KWA; 6	7th	1819	
2010	Team 3 Red Racing	3	Chevy	DEL; 10	MSP; 10	ASE; 4	TOR; 22	EDM; 6	MPS; 9	SAS; 6	CTR; 8	MSP; 15	CGV; 5	BAR; 10	RIS; 5	KWA; 7	6th	1826	
2011	Team 3 Red Racing	3	Chevy	MSP; 6	ICAR; 15	DEL; 8	MSP; 21	TOR; 20	MPS; 18	SAS; 6	CTR; 26	CGV; 32	BAR; 2	RIS; 7	KWA; 21		9th	1450	
2012	Team 3 Red Racing	3	Chevy	MSP; 6	ICAR; 23	MSP; 5	DEL; 3	MPS; 2	EDM; 2	SAS; 21	CTR; 15	CGV; 26	BAR; 8	RIS; 17	KWA; 12		7th	390	
2013	Team 3 Red Racing	3	Chevy	MSP; 3	DEL; 11	MSP; 4	ICAR; 20	MPS; 2	SAS; 3	ASE; 14	CTR; 4	RIS; 1	MSP; 25	BAR; 1*	KWA; 11		3rd	442	
2014	Team 3 Red Racing	3	Chevy	MSP; 24	ACD; 1*	ICAR; 9	EIR; 3	SAS; 2	ASE; 11	CTR; 8	RIS; 12	MSP; 30	BAR; 1*	KWA; 3			5th	393	
2015	Team 3 Red Racing	3	Chevy	MSP; 7	ACD; 1	SSS; 2	ICAR; 11	EIR; 3	SAS; 2	ASE; 15	CTR; 8	RIS; 6	MSP; 1	KWA; 1*			2nd	442	
2016	Team 3 Red Racing	3	Chevy	MSP; 9*	SSS; 17	ACD; 7	ICAR; 21	TOR; 11	EIR; 17	SAS; 17	CTR; 18	RIS; 3	MSP; 5	ASE; 10	KWA; 1*		9th	401	
2017	Team 3 Red Racing	3	Chevy	MSP; 8	DEL; 10	ACD	ICAR	TOR	SAS	SAS	EIR	CTR	RIS	MSP; 13	ASE	JUK	24th	101	
2019	Team 3 Red Racing	3	Chevy	MSP; 5	JUK; 14	ACD; 16	TOR; 8	SAS; 5	SAS; 17	EIR; 2	CTR; 6	RIS; 1	MSP; 6	ASE; 1	NHA; 17	JUK; 2	4th	481	
2020	Team 3 Red Racing	3	Chevy	SUN; 9*	SUN; 1*	FLA; 1*	FLA; 2	JUK; 1*	JUK; 3								1st	265	
2024	Ed Hakonson Racing	3	Chevy	MSP; 12	ACD; 7	AVE; 6	RIS; 2	RIS; 2	OSK; 14	SAS; 5	EIR; 11	CTR; 21	ICAR; 12	MSP; 26	DEL; 7	AMS; 16	6th	433	
2025	Ed Hakonson Racing	3	Chevy	MSP; 9	RIS; 9	EDM; 8	SAS; 2	CMP	ACD	CTR	ICAR	MSP	DEL	DEL	AMS		17th	149	

==== K&N Pro Series East ====
NASCAR K&N Pro Series East results
Year	Team	No.	Make	1	2	3	4	5	6	7	8	9	10	11	12	13	14	NKNPSEC	Pts	Ref
2012	Spraker Racing	37	Chevy	BRI	GRE	RCH	IOW	BGS	JFC	LGY	CNB	COL	IOW	NHA	DOV	GRE; 18	CAR	65th	26	

^{*} Season still in progress
^{1} Ineligible for series points
