= Motoplex Speedway =

Race track in Spallumcheen, British Columbia

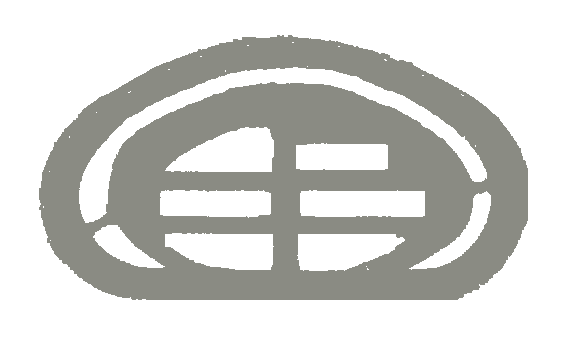
- Tri-Oval (2000–2015)
- Location: Spallumcheen, Vernon, Canada
- Coordinates: 50°22′12″N 119°18′20″W
- Capacity: 7,500 Grandstand + Motorhome Hill
- Opened: 2000
- Closed: 2015
- Former names: SunValley Speedway
- Major events: NASCAR Canadian Tire Series; A & W Cruisin the Dub 300 (2007–2013); CASCAR Super Series (2005–2006); CASCAR West Series (2000–2006)
- Website: http://www.motoplexspeedway.com/

Tri-Oval (2000–2015)
- Surface: Asphalt
- Length: 0.805 km (0.500 mi)
- Turns: 4
- Banking: Turns 1/2: 11° Turns 3/4: 14°

Motoplex Speedway and Event Park, formerly known as SunValley Speedway, was a paved tri-oval auto racing facility located in Spallumcheen, north of Vernon, British Columbia, Canada. The facility features a 7,500-seat, 0.500 mi (0.805 km) NASCAR-sanctioned tri-oval. There are also hot pits for 38 cars, 105 polished cement pit stalls, and a 10-acre (40,000 m^{2}) campground with elevated motor home parking. In 2010, the venue began being used for other events including concerts.

The last event was held in 2015 due to legal actions, and the owners have applied to rezone the property for industrial use.

== NASCAR Canadian Tire Series events ==
Season	Date	Event	Winning driver
2007	July 15	British Columbia Dodge Dealers Dodge Avenger 300	J. R. Fitzpatrick
2008	July 19	A&W Cruisin' the Dub 300	Don Thomson Jr.
2009	July 18	A&W Cruisin' the Dub 300	Andrew Ranger
2010	July 31	A&W Cruisin' the Dub 300	Scott Steckly
2011	July 23	A&W Cruisin' the Dub 300	Scott Steckly
2012	July 14	A&W Cruisin' the Dub 300	D. J. Kennington
2013	July 13	A&W Crusin' The Dub 300	Scott Steckly
