= Autodrome Saint-Eustache =

Motorsport venue in Saint-Eustache, Quebec

- Location: Saint-Eustache, Quebec
- Coordinates: 45°34′24″N 73°57′45″W
- Opened: 1965
- Closed: 2019
- Former names: Circuit Deux Montagne
- Major events: NASCAR Pinty's Series; National 250 presented by Public Mobile (2008–2010, 2013–2019); Canadian Superbike Championship (2002–2003, 2011–2019); Formula D (2015–2017); American Canadian Tour (1979, 2007); CASCAR Super Series (1993–2003, 2005–2006); CASCAR East Series (1998–2000)
- Website: http://www.autodrome.ca/

Oval (1965–2019)
- Surface: Asphalt
- Length: 0.400 mi (0.644 km)

Road Course
- Surface: Asphalt
- Length: 1.100 mi (1.770 km)
- Turns: 15

Drag strip

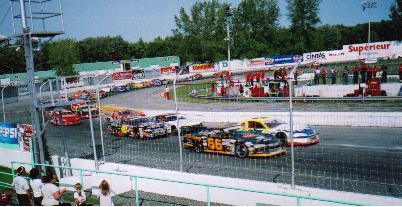
Short track

The Autodrome Saint-Eustache was a motor sport complex in Saint-Eustache, Quebec, Canada. Established in 1965, it contained a 0.400 mi (0.644 km) paved oval and a 1.100 mi (1.770 km) paved road course with hot pits, grandstands and services.

The oval circuit hosted NASCAR Whelen All-American Series weekly racing, with drivers racing for both the province (Quebec) and the rest of North America. Its premier event was the NASCAR Pinty's Series which raced at the track since the creation of the series. The track also formerly held CASCAR Super Series events.

In an agreement with the City of Saint-Eustache, the property was sold to Hydro-Québec at the end of the 2019 racing season. The expanding infrastructure of the city of Saint-Eustache was cited as the main reason for the track's demise.

== See also ==
- List of auto racing tracks in Canada
