= 2017 NASCAR Pinty's Series =

11th NASCAR Pinty's Series season

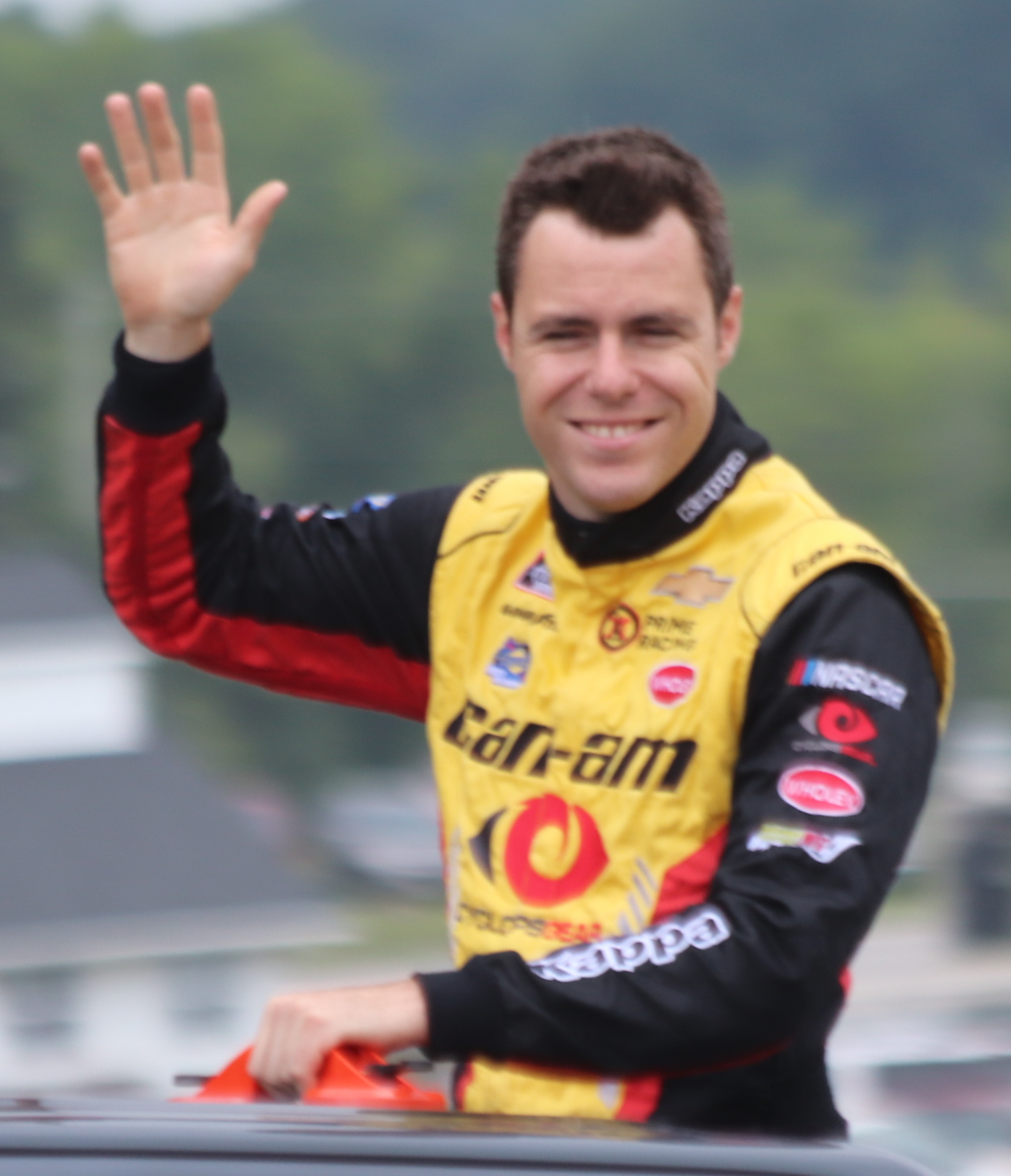
Alex Labbé, the 2017 Pinty's Series champion

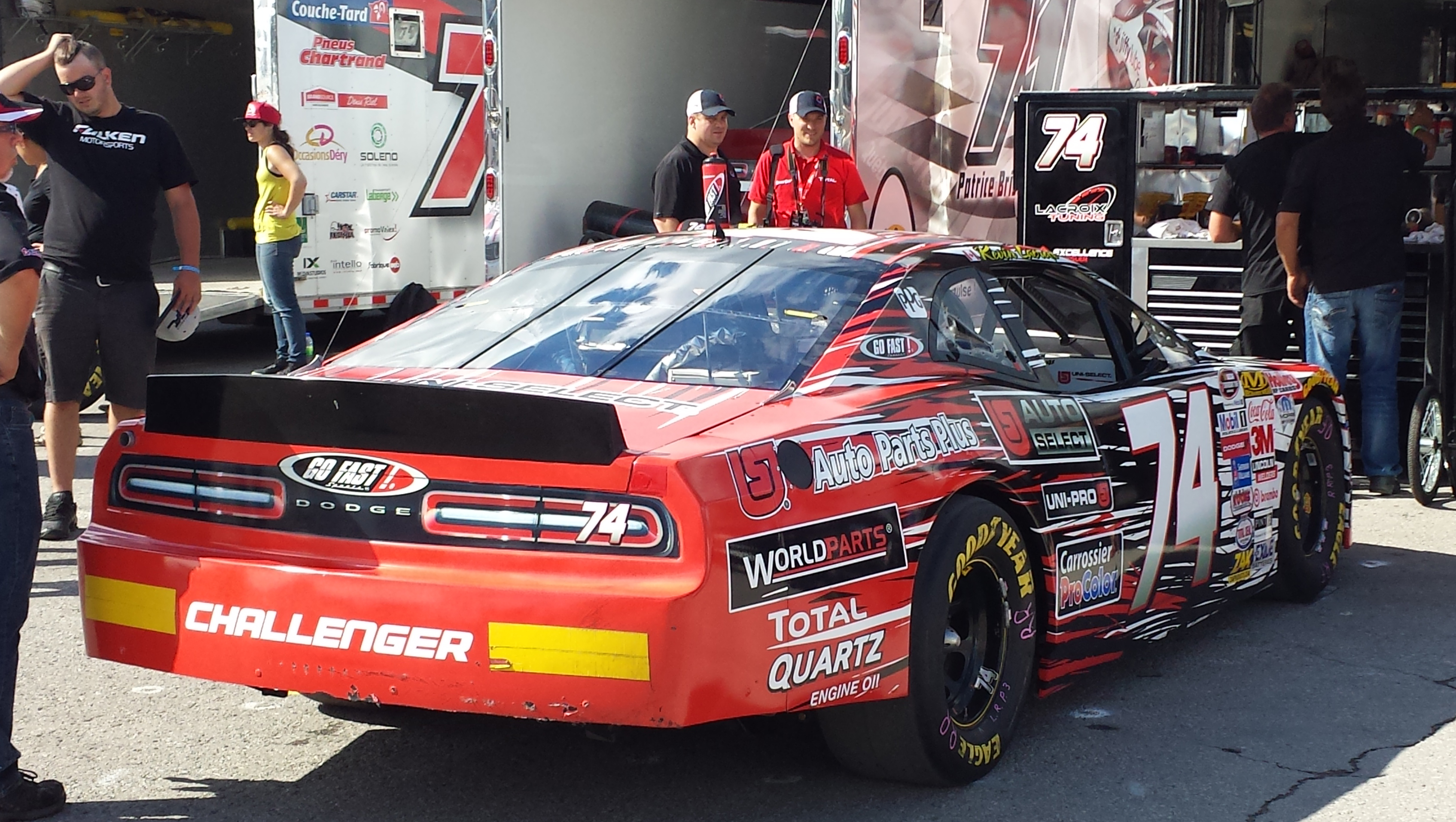
Kevin Lacroix finished 2nd in the championship standings

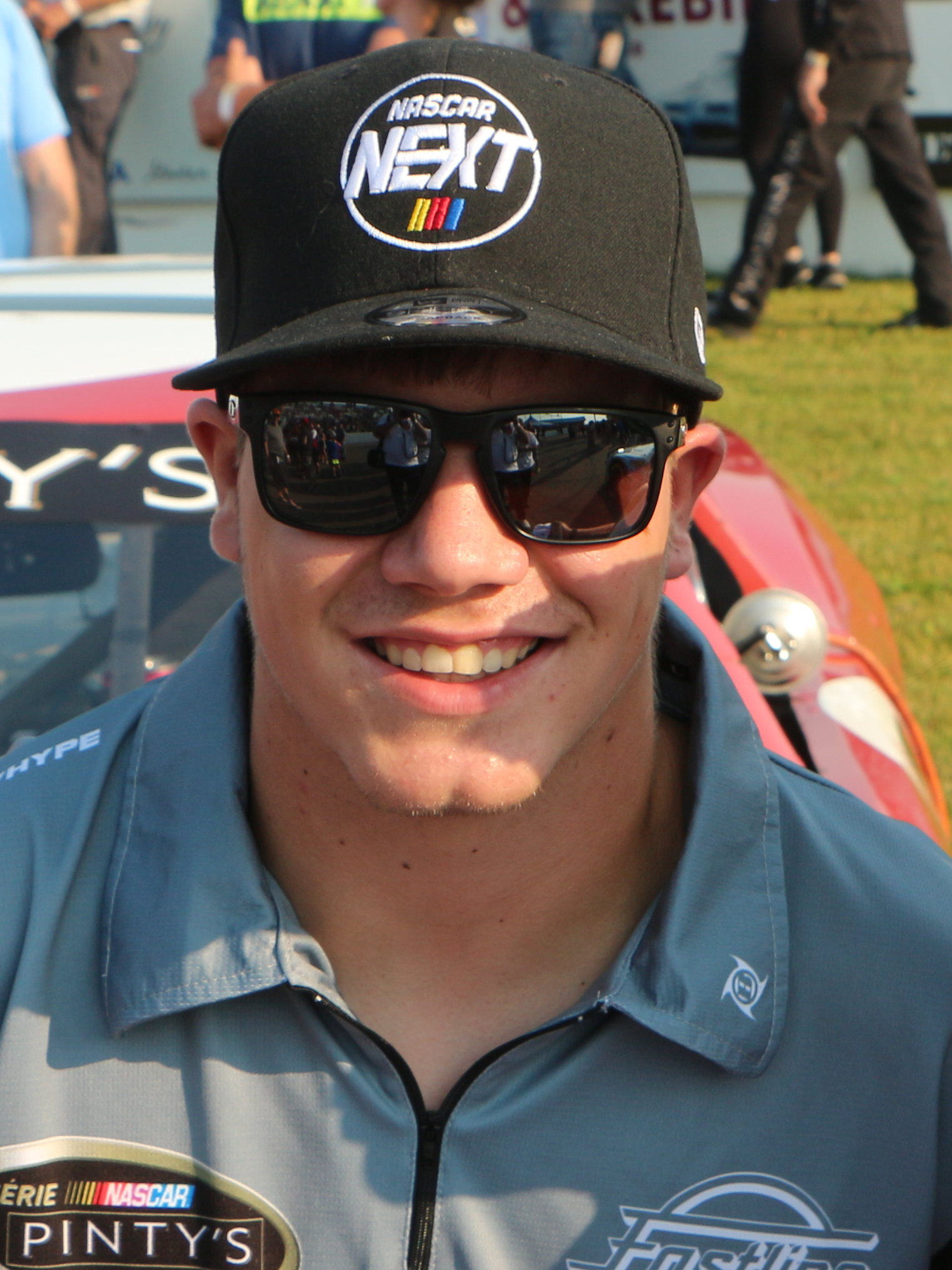
Cayden Lapcevich, the defending champion, finished 3rd in the championship standings

The 2017 NASCAR Pinty's Series was the eleventh season of the NASCAR Pinty's Series. Beginning on May 21 at Canadian Tire Motorsport Park, the season consisted of thirteen races at eleven different venues in Canada. The season ended at Jukasa Motor Speedway on September 23. Cayden Lapcevich is the defending Drivers' Champion. Alex Labbé won the championship when the Green Flag dropped at the last race, as there were not enough entries for Labbé to lose that many points that Kevin Lacroix could have taken the championship. Labbé won the championship by a 16-point margin over Lacroix.

== Drivers ==
No.	Manufacturer	Car Owner	Race Driver	Crew Chief
1	Ford	Bud Morris	Joey McColm 1	Ed Wrong
02	Ford	Susan Micks	Matthew Scannell 4	Rino Montanari 5 Jeff Walt 4 Howie Scannell Jr. 4
02	Ford	Susan Micks	Mark Dilley 8	Rino Montanari 5 Jeff Walt 4 Howie Scannell Jr. 4
02	Ford	Susan Micks	Robin Buck 1	Rino Montanari 5 Jeff Walt 4 Howie Scannell Jr. 4
03	Dodge	Elie Arseneau	Elie Arseneau 1	Brandon White
3	Chevrolet	Ed Hakonson	Jason Hathaway 3	Craig Masters
04	Dodge	Eric Kerub	Jean-François Dumoulin	Robin McCluskey
4	Dodge	Rob McConnell	Trevor Monaghan 1	Rob McConnell
5	Dodge	Kevin Dowler	Noel Dowler 6	Rick Crawford
8	Dodge 7 Ford 1	Bud Morris	Larry Jackson 4	Ed Wrong 3 Dave Stephens 4 Kevin Hien 1
8	Dodge 7 Ford 1	Bud Morris	Brett Taylor (R) 1	Ed Wrong 3 Dave Stephens 4 Kevin Hien 1
8	Dodge 7 Ford 1	Bud Morris	Jason Hankewich 1	Ed Wrong 3 Dave Stephens 4 Kevin Hien 1
8	Dodge 7 Ford 1	Bud Morris	Joey McColm 2	Ed Wrong 3 Dave Stephens 4 Kevin Hien 1
09	Dodge	Trevor Seibert	Charles Harvey (R) 3	Jeremy Coulter 1
09	Dodge	Trevor Seibert	Charles Harvey (R) 3	Al Lebert 2
9	Ford	Brad Martin	Adam Martin (R)	Terry Wilson 12
9	Ford	Brad Martin	Adam Martin (R)	Vic Decker 1
10	Dodge	Murray Haukaas	Luc Haukaas (R) 3	Brett Haukaas
11	Dodge	Martin Cote	Martin Cote (R) 5	Unknown 1
11	Dodge	Martin Cote	Martin Cote (R) 5	Denys Beaudin 1
11	Dodge	Martin Cote	Martin Cote (R) 5	Dave Coursol 1
11	Dodge	Martin Cote	Martin Cote (R) 5	Herby Drescher 2
15	Ford	Bill Mathews	Steve Mathews 1	Unknown
17	Dodge	Doug Kennington	D. J. Kennington	Ted McAlister
18	Dodge	Colin Livingston 2	Alex Tagliani	Tyler Case
18	Dodge	Scott Steckly 11	Alex Tagliani	Tyler Case
20	Dodge	Anthony Parisien	Raymond Guay (R) 2	Herby Drescher
21	Chevrolet 2	Rob McConnell	Jason White 2	Rob McConnell
21	Dodge 1	Rob McConnell	Trevor Monaghan 1	Rob McConnell
22	Dodge 9	Scott Steckly	Christopher Bell 1	Randy Steckly 12; Scott Steckly 1
22	Dodge 9	Scott Steckly	Donald Theetge (R) 8	Randy Steckly 12; Scott Steckly 1
22	Chevrolet 4	Scott Steckly	Marc-Antoine Camirand 4	Randy Steckly 12; Scott Steckly 1
25	Dodge 6 Ford 5 Chevrolet 2	Bud Morris	Brett Taylor (R) 2	Frank Millman 1 Ed Wrong 4 Clement Samson 5 Dave Stephens 1 Kevin Hien 2
25	Dodge 6 Ford 5 Chevrolet 2	Bud Morris	Larry Jackson 3	Frank Millman 1 Ed Wrong 4 Clement Samson 5 Dave Stephens 1 Kevin Hien 2
25	Dodge 6 Ford 5 Chevrolet 2	Bud Morris	Simon Dion-Viens 5	Frank Millman 1 Ed Wrong 4 Clement Samson 5 Dave Stephens 1 Kevin Hien 2
25	Dodge 6 Ford 5 Chevrolet 2	Bud Morris	Jason Hankewich 2	Frank Millman 1 Ed Wrong 4 Clement Samson 5 Dave Stephens 1 Kevin Hien 2
25	Dodge 6 Ford 5 Chevrolet 2	Bud Morris	Joey McColm 1	Frank Millman 1 Ed Wrong 4 Clement Samson 5 Dave Stephens 1 Kevin Hien 2
27	Dodge	Doug Kennington	Andrew Ranger 12	David Wight
27	Dodge	Doug Kennington	Larry Jackson 1	David Wight
28	Dodge	Doug Kennington 2 D. J. Kennington 6	Larry Jackson 1	Dave Stephens 1
28	Dodge	Doug Kennington 2 D. J. Kennington 6	Armani Williams (R) 6	Joey McColm 3
28	Dodge	Doug Kennington 2 D. J. Kennington 6	Armani Williams (R) 6	Ed Wrong 3
28	Dodge	Doug Kennington 2 D. J. Kennington 6	John Fletcher 1	Scott Fletcher 1
32	Ford	Alain Lord Mounir	Alex Labbé	Mario Gosselin
42	Chevrolet	Peter Klutt	Ryan Klutt (R) 1	Jason Humphries
42	Chevrolet	Peter Klutt	Peter Klutt 2	Jason Humphries
43	Dodge	Trevor Seibert	Robin Buck 3	Daniel Bois 1
43	Dodge	Trevor Seibert	Robin Buck 3	Jeff Steenbakkers 1
43	Dodge	Trevor Seibert	Robin Buck 3	Al Lebert 1
44	Chevrolet 1	Scott Steckly	Adam Andretti (R) 2	Mike Knott
44	Dodge 1	Scott Steckly	Adam Andretti (R) 2	Mike Knott
46	Chevrolet	Lewis Krzysik	Jamie Krzysik (R) 1	Lewis Krzysik
47	Dodge	Marc-André Bergeron	Louis-Philippe Dumoulin	Bill Burns
51	Dodge	Murray Haukaas	Nick Jewell 3	David Hall
54	Dodge	Holly Klym	Stefan Klym (R) 3	Tony Mickelchuk
55	Dodge	Holly Klym	Destiny Klym (R) 3	Devon Brown
56	Dodge	Dan Bray	David Michaud (R) 3	Jonathan Lavoie 1 Mike Knott 3
56	Dodge	Dan Bray	Brad Graham 1	Jonathan Lavoie 1 Mike Knott 3
59	Dodge	Peter Klutt	Gary Klutt 6	John Fletcher
67	Chevrolet	David Thorndyke	David Thorndyke 2	Kattie Smilovsky
69	Chevrolet	Trevor Seibert	Carl Gauthier (R) 1	Al Lebert
69	Chevrolet	Trevor Seibert	Trevor Seibert 1	Al Lebert
74	Dodge	Sylvain Lacroix	Kevin Lacroix	Don Thomson Jr.
76	Dodge	Sherri Lapcevich	Cayden Lapcevich	Jeff Lapcevich
77	Dodge	Katherine Almeida	Jocelyn Fecteau 2	Eric-Pierre Martel
83	Chevrolet	Menno Admiraal	Ian Admiraal (R) 3	Travis Sharpe
89	Ford	Donald Chisholm	Donald Chisholm 2	George Koszkulics
95	Dodge	Peter Simone	Anthony Simone 12	Nick Markwell 9
95	Dodge	Peter Simone	Anthony Simone 12	Paul Simone 2
95	Dodge	Peter Simone	Anthony Simone 12	Greg Franklin 1
99	Chevrolet	Brandon White	Brandon White 4	Zach Goodleaf 2
99	Chevrolet	Brandon White	Brandon White 4	Simon Charron 2

== Schedule ==
No.	Race title	Tracks	Date
1	Can-Am 200	Canadian Tire Motorsport Park, Bowmanville	May 21
2	Choko/Fast Eddie 250 presented by Havoline	Delaware Speedway, London	June 3
3	CRS Express 300	Autodrome Chaudière, Vallée-Jonction	June 25 (Note: The CRS Express 300 was postponed six days due to the forecast for rain throughout the weekend, before being postponed another two days due to the forecast for rain.)
4	ECKO Unlimited 75	Circuit ICAR, Mirabel	July 8
5	Pinty's Grand Prix of Toronto	Exhibition Place, Toronto	July 15
6	Velocity Prairie Thunder Twin 100s presented by Bayer	Wyant Group Raceway, Saskatoon	July 25
7	Velocity Prairie Thunder Twin 100s presented by Bayer	Wyant Group Raceway, Saskatoon	July 25
8	LUXXUR 300 presented by Bayer	Edmonton International Raceway, Wetaskiwin	July 29
9	Le 50 Tours Can-Am	Circuit Trois-Rivières, Trois-Rivières	August 13
10	Bumper to Bumper 300	Riverside International Speedway, Antigonish	August 20 (Note: The Bumper to Bumper 300 was postponed a day due to persistent inclement weather.)
11	Total Quartz 200	Canadian Tire Motorsport Park, Bowmanville	September 3
12	Lucas Oil 250 presented by Bumper to Bumper & Coors Light	Autodrome Saint-Eustache, Saint-Eustache	September 9
13	Pinty's Fall Brawl 200	Jukasa Motor Speedway, Cayuga	September 23

Notes

- The race at Kawartha Speedway was originally scheduled for 16 September, but was removed from the schedule by NASCAR on 2 August following recent management changes. The season finale moved to 23 September to the newly reopened track Jukasa Motor Speedway.

== Results and standings ==
=== Races ===
No.	Race	Pole position	Most laps led	Winning driver	Manufacturer
1	Can-Am 200	Kevin Lacroix	Kevin Lacroix	Kevin Lacroix	Dodge
2	Choko/Fast Eddie 250 presented by Havoline	Andrew Ranger	Kevin Lacroix	Alex Labbé	Ford
3	CRS Express 300	Donald Theetge	Cayden Lapcevich	Cayden Lapcevich	Dodge
4	ECKO Unlimited 75	Alex Tagliani	Alex Tagliani	Kevin Lacroix	Dodge
5	Pinty's Grand Prix of Toronto	Andrew Ranger	Kevin Lacroix	Kevin Lacroix	Dodge
6	Velocity Prairie Thunder Twin 100s presented by Bayer	Kevin Lacroix	Alex Labbé	Alex Labbé	Ford
7	Velocity Prairie Thunder Twin 100s presented by Bayer	D. J. Kennington^{1}	D. J. Kennington	Cayden Lapcevich	Dodge
8	LUXXUR 300 presented by Bayer	Alex Labbé	Alex Labbé	Alex Labbé	Ford
9	Le 50 Tours Can-Am	Andrew Ranger	Alex Tagliani	Alex Tagliani	Dodge
10	Bumper to Bumper 300	D. J. Kennington^{2}	Alex Tagliani	Alex Labbé	Ford
11	Total Quartz 200	Kevin Lacroix	Kevin Lacroix	Kevin Lacroix	Dodge
12	Lucas Oil 250 presented by Bumper to Bumper & Coors Light	Kevin Lacroix	Alex Labbé	Alex Labbé	Ford
13	Pinty's Fall Brawl 200	D. J. Kennington	Donald Theetge	Cayden Lapcevich	Dodge

Notes

- ^{1} – Starting grid was set by the fastest lap times from the first Velocity Prairie Thunder Twin 100 race.
- ^{2} – The qualifying session for the Bumper to Bumper 300 was cancelled due to weather. The starting line-up was decided by Practice results.

=== Drivers' championship ===
(key) Bold – Pole position awarded by time. Italics – Pole position set by final practice results or Owners' points. * – Most laps led.

Pos.	Driver	MSP	DEL	ACD	ICAR	TOR	WYA	WYA	EIR	CTR	RIV	MSP	STE	JUK	Points
1	Alex Labbé	5	1	2	4	4	1*	3	**1***	5	1	6	1*	20	542
2	Kevin Lacroix	**1***	5*	6	1	1*	**8**	4	9	18	2*	**1***	**4**	4	526
3	Cayden Lapcevich	4	12	1*	16	7	3	1	3	7	9	11	3	1	509
4	Louis-Philippe Dumoulin	6	4	3	14	2	6	5	5	4	14	5	5	3	497
5	D. J. Kennington	17	3	4	8	6	2	**2***	6	8	**3**	9	7	**17**	486
6	Alex Tagliani	18	2	7	**5***	14	20	9	4	1*	6	2	10	6	477
7	Andrew Ranger	2	**6**	9	2	**15**	10	7	INJ^{1}	**2**	5	3	8	10	454
8	Jean-François Dumoulin	7	7	8	13	5	9	19	15	6	7	14	6	5	451
9	Adam Martin **(R)**	10	9	11	15	13	13	12	10	11	8	12	14	19	415
10	Anthony Simone	22	16	Wth	9	8	19	11	8	19		4	11	15	344
11	Donald Theetge **(R)**		18	**5**			4	6	2		10		2	2*	308
12	Larry Jackson	21	17	10	7	12			11	10		17		7	284
13	Mark Dilley		15	13			11	8	7		4		9	18	269
14	Gary Klutt	3				9	5	10		13		8			216
15	Noel Dowler		13				7	20	17			18		9	180
16	Simon Dion-Viens			12	6					9	11		12		170
17	Armani Williams **(R)**		11				14	13	Wth		12			13	157
18	Marc-Antoine Camirand				3	16				3		7			148
19	Martin Cote **(R)**	19				19				17		20		16	129
20	Brandon White									12		22	13	11	118
21	Robin Buck	16				17				14		24			105
22	Joey McColm	24									15	19	15		103
23	Matthew Scannell	20			17	20						16			103
24	Jason Hathaway	8	10									13			101
25	Brett Taylor **(R)**	9				18			13						92
26	David Michaud **(R)**	11			10					20					91
27	Ian Admiraal **(R)**						15	15	16						86
28	Stefan Klym **(R)**						16	17	14						85
29	Destiny Klym **(R)**						18	16	18						80
30	Adam Andretti **(R)**					3						10			75
31	Donald Chisholm										13			8	68
32	Jason White	14	8												66
33	Peter Klutt					10						15			63
34	Raymond Guay **(R)**				12					16					60
35	Luc Haukaas **(R)**						12	18	Wth						58
36	Jason Hankewich						17	14	Wth						57
37	Charles Harvey **(R)**	15	Wth										16		57
38	Trevor Monaghan											21		14	53
39	David Thorndyke	13										23			52
40	Elie Arseneau				11										33
41	Trevor Seibert					11									33
42	Ryan Klutt **(R)**	12													32
43	Jamie Krzysik **(R)**								12						32
44	Brad Graham													12	32
45	Steve Mathews		14												30
46	John Fletcher			14											30
47	Jocelyn Fecteau									15		Wth			29
48	Christopher Bell	23													21
49	Carl Gauthier **(R)**	25													19
	Nick Jewell						Wth	Wth	Wth						0
Pos.	Driver	MSP	DEL	ACD	ICAR	TOR	WYA	WYA	EIR	CTR	RIV	MSP	STE	JUK	Points

Notes

- ^{1} – Andrew Ranger got ill after practice of the LUXXUR 300 presented by Bayer and before qualifying the team put Larry Jackson in the car.

== See also ==
- 2017 Monster Energy NASCAR Cup Series
- 2017 NASCAR Xfinity Series
- 2017 NASCAR Camping World Truck Series
- 2017 NASCAR K&N Pro Series East
- 2017 NASCAR K&N Pro Series West
- 2017 NASCAR Whelen Modified Tour
- 2017 NASCAR PEAK Mexico Series
- 2017 NASCAR Whelen Euro Series
