= 2011 NASCAR Canadian Tire Series =

2011 NASCAR Canadian Tire Series season
- NASCAR Canadian Tire Series

Season
- Races: 14
- Start date: May 28
- End date: September 24

Awards
- Champion: Scott Steckly

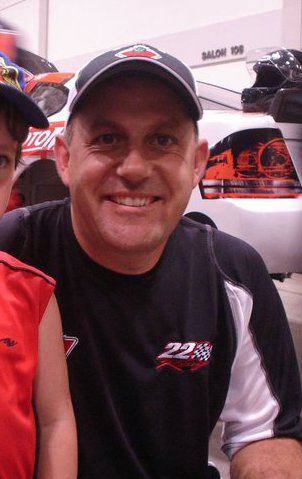
Scott Steckly, the 2011 NASCAR Canada Series champion.

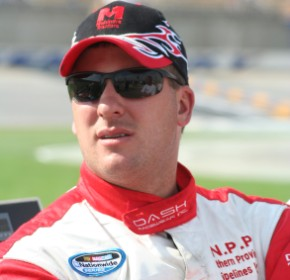
D. J. Kennington finished second in the points.

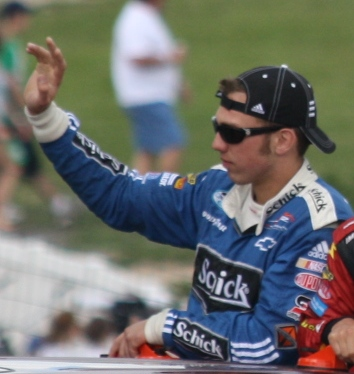
J. R. Fitzpatrick finished third in points.

The 2011 NASCAR Canadian Tire Series was the fifth season of the NASCAR Canadian Tire Series. This season comprised twelve races at eleven different venues, seven of which were contested on oval courses.

== Overview ==
The fifth season of racing had a few different race procedures for the 12 events to be run this season spanning across 5 provinces featuring 12 events. New procedures include a new rookie of the year format, the introduction of the wave around and three attempts at a green-white-checker finish. All of the races were televised on TSN in one-hour tape delayed episodes, excluding Circuit Gilles Villeneuve and Toronto which were aired live on the network.

The season started off May 28 at Mosport International Raceway, where 2008 champion Scott Steckly led most of race and went on to win the event. He won three events and finished in the runner up position 4 times on his way to capture his second championship over D. J. Kennington, who had a pair of wins. Long time road racer Robin Buck and Rookie Peter Shepherd III won their first career events respectively. Andrew Ranger won the two biggest events of the year in dominant fashion at Montreal and Toronto. Former champion Don Thomson Jr. retired after a lengthy career.

== Drivers ==
| No. | Manufacturer | Car Owner | Race Driver | Crew Chief |
|---|---|---|---|---|
| 00 | Dodge | Pierre Bourque | Pierre Bourque 5 | Brandon Suk 1 Al Lebert 3 Tyler Case 1 |
| 01 | Dodge | Garry McColman | Chris Raabe 3 | Tyler Case |
| 02 | Ford | Susan Micks | Kerry Micks | Tyler Case 6 Ray McCaughey 6 |
| 03 | Chevrolet | Jason Roussakis | Elie Arseneau 4 | Jason Roussakis 2 Yvon Turcotte 2 |
| 3 | Dodge | Ed Hakonson | Jason Hathaway | Craig Masters |
| 04 | Dodge | Paul Corbeil | Jean-François Dumoulin 5 | Tony Pratte |
| 5 | Dodge 6 Ford 6 | Kevin Dowler | Pete Vanderwyst 1 | Kevin Dowler 2 Chris Wright 10 |
| 5 | Dodge 6 Ford 6 | Kevin Dowler | Noel Dowler 10 | Kevin Dowler 2 Chris Wright 10 |
| 5 | Dodge 6 Ford 6 | Kevin Dowler | Kenny Forth 1 | Kevin Dowler 2 Chris Wright 10 |
| 07 | Ford | Dave Jacombs | Isabelle Tremblay 11 | Randy Smith |
| 7 | Dodge | Sharon Shepherd | Peter Shepherd III 7 | Don Jacobson |
| 8 | Dodge | Ed Hakonson | Don Thomson Jr. | Sandy Hamilton 10; Mike Wallace 2 |
| 9 | Dodge | Ian Farwell | Mark Dilley | Rino Montanari |
| 10 | Chevrolet | Derek White | Brandon White 1 | Jonathan Côté |
| 11 | Dodge | Marty Gaunt | Jason Bowles 2 | Jeff Fultz 1 Jonathan Davis 1 |
| 12 | Dodge 2 Chevrolet 1 | Dave Jacombs | Alex Tagliani 2 | Brian Ellas 1 Tyler Case 2 |
| 12 | Dodge 2 Chevrolet 1 | Dave Jacombs | Jim White 1 | Brian Ellas 1 Tyler Case 2 |
| 13 | Chevrolet | Christopher Ecklund | Trevor Monaghan 1 | Rob McConnell |
| 14 | Chevrolet | James Van Domselaar | James Van Domselaar 3 | Jim Van Domselaar |
| 15 | Ford | Bill Mathews | Steven Mathews 8 | Rick McColl 2 Bill Mathews 1 Steve Mifsud 2 Alex Nagy 3 |
| 17 | Dodge | Doug Kennington | D. J. Kennington | Dave Wight |
| 19 | Dodge 4 Ford 1 | Reg Arsenault | Brad Graham 5 | Bill Dobson |
| 21 | Dodge | Rob Zimmer 5 Skip Ambrose 7 | Jason White | Derek Lynch |
| 22 | Dodge | Scott Steckly | Scott Steckly | Giulio Montanari |
| 23 | Dodge | Joe Lapcevich | Jeff Lapcevich 9 | Tim Ellas |
| 25 | Chevrolet | Jason White | Sarah Cornett-Ching 1 | Joe Cornett-Ching |
| 27 | Dodge | Dave Jacombs | Andrew Ranger 4 | Bill Burns 1 Harry Misener 3 |
| 29 | Dodge | Ray Courtemanche Jr. | Ray Courtemanche Jr. 3 | Jean-Pierre LeClerc |
| 36 | Chevrolet | Les Harding | Shannon Harding 2 | Les Harding |
| 42 | Chevrolet | Peter Klutt | Peter Klutt 5 | Ken Stewart |
| 44 | Ford 4 Chevrolet 2 | Brian Whissell | Jarrad Whissell 6 | Donald Barhardt 2 Rob Hamilton 4 |
| 46 | Chevrolet | Rob Howlett | Dan Shirley 1 | Rob Howlett |
| 47 | Dodge | Marc-Andre Bergeron | Louis-Philippe Dumoulin 8 | Jimmy Briere 5 Vic Decker 3 |
| 48 | Chevrolet | Kevin Kozack | Nathan Weenk 2 | Howard Chappell |
| 50 | Dodge | John Atto | Joey McColm 5 | Frank Millman |
| 51 | Dodge | Murray Haukass | Nick Jewell 2 | Dave Hall |
| 55 | Dodge 9 Chevrolet 3 | Kristin Hamelin | Dexter Stacey | Robin McCluskey |
| 56 | Dodge | Jim Bray | Doug Brown 1 | Kevin Blacklock |
| 56 | Dodge | Jim Bray | Howie Scannell Jr. 4 | Carl Williams |
| 56 | Dodge | Jim Bray | John Fletcher 1 | Carl Williams |
| 59 | Chevrolet 5 Dodge 1 | John Farano | John Farano 6 | Ken Stewart |
| 60 | Dodge | Ronald Beauchamp Sr. | Ron Beauchamp Jr. | Mike Knott |
| 66 | Dodge | Sandra D'Angelo | Robin Buck 5 | Randy Gray |
| 67 | Chevrolet | David Thorndyke | David Thorndyke 4 | Adam Thorndyke |
| 69 | Ford 3 Dodge 1 | Trevor Seibert | Trevor Seibert 3 | Dave Bruin |
| 69 | Ford 3 Dodge 1 | Trevor Seibert | Ryley Seibert 1 | Dave Bruin |
| 71 | Dodge 2 Chevrolet 1 | Patrice Brisebois | Patrice Brisebois 3 | Dominique Chagnon 1 Yves Boisvert 2 |
| 80 | Chevrolet | Donald Theetge | Donald Theetge 2 | Benoit Theetge |
| 82 | Dodge | Dave Connelly | Dave Connelly 5 | Mike Kenyon |
| 84 | Chevrolet | John Fitzpatrick | J. R. Fitzpatrick | Ted McAlister |
| 85 | Chevrolet | Sayda Nsairi | Michel Pilon 3 | Claude Vigeant |
| 89 | Ford | John Chisholm | Donald Chisholm 3 | George Koszkulics |
| 90 | Dodge | Normand Roy | Martin Roy 4 | François Adam |
| 94 | Chevrolet | Andre Coursol | Dave Coursol 2 | Andre Coursol |
| 96 | Dodge | Ron Beauchamp, Sr. | Sebastien Dussault 1 | Ron Beauchamp, Sr. |
| 97 | Ford | Yvon Vannini | Hugo Vannini 8 | Yvon Vannini |
| 98 | Chevrolet | John Chisholm | John Flemming 1 | Andrew Hicken |
| 99 | Chevrolet | Derek White | Derek White 8 | Jonathan Côté |
| 99 | Chevrolet | Derek White | Steve Côté 1 | Jonathan Côté |

== Schedule ==
2011 venues

The 2011 calendar consists of twelve races at eleven different venues. Circuit ICAR in Mirabel, Quebec will make its debut in the series this year.

| Race | Name | Track | Date | Time | |
| Race | Name | Track | Date | Local | UTC |
|---|---|---|---|---|---|
| 1 | Dickies 200 | Mosport Speedway, Bowmanville | May 28 | 19:00 | 23:00 |
| 2 | Grand Prix ICAR Mirabel | Circuit ICAR, Mirabel | June 5 | 15:30 | 19:30 |
| 3 | Keystone Light 200 | Delaware Speedway, Delaware | June 11 | 19:00 | 23:00 |
| 4 | Vortex Brake Pads 200 | Mosport International Raceway, Bowmanville | June 26 | | |
| 5 | Streets of Toronto 100 | Exhibition Place, Toronto | July 9 | | |
| 6 | A&W Crusin' the Dub 300 | SunValley Speedway, Vernon | July 23 | | |
| 7 | Velocity Prairie Thunder | Auto Clearing Motor Speedway, Saskatoon | July 27 | | |
| 8 | GP3R 100 | Circuit Trois-Rivières, Trois-Rivières | August 7 | | |
| 9 | NAPA Autopro 100 | Circuit Gilles Villeneuve, Montreal | August 20 | | |
| 10 | Wild Wing 300 | Barrie Speedway, Barrie | September 10 | | |
| 11 | Komatsu 300 | Riverside Speedway, Antigonish | September 17 | | |
| 12 | Kawartha 250 | Kawartha Speedway, Peterborough | September 24 | | |

== Results ==
=== Races ===
| Race | Name | Pole position | Most laps led | Winning driver | Manufacturer |
|---|---|---|---|---|---|
| 1 | Dickies 200 | J. R. Fitzpatrick | Scott Steckly | Scott Steckly | Dodge |
| 2 | Grand Prix ICAR Mirabel | Alex Tagliani | Alex Tagliani | Robin Buck | Dodge |
| 3 | Keystone Light 200 | Peter Shepherd III | J. R. Fitzpatrick | Don Thomson Jr. | Dodge |
| 4 | Vortex Brake Pads 200 | Scott Steckly ‡ | J. R. Fitzpatrick | D. J. Kennington | Dodge |
| 5 | Streets of Toronto 100 | Jason Bowles | Andrew Ranger | Andrew Ranger | Dodge |
| 6 | A&W Cruisin' the Dub 300 | Scott Steckly | D. J. Kennington | Scott Steckly | Dodge |
| 7 | Velocity Prairie Thunder | D. J. Kennington | D. J. Kennington | Peter Shepherd III | Dodge |
| 8 | GP3R 100 | Andrew Ranger | Robin Buck | Robin Buck | Dodge |
| 9 | NAPA Autopro 100 | Andrew Ranger | Andrew Ranger | Andrew Ranger | Dodge |
| 10 | Wild Wing 300 | Scott Steckly | Scott Steckly | Mark Dilley | Dodge |
| 11 | Komatsu 300 | Scott Steckly | Scott Steckly | Scott Steckly | Dodge |
| 12 | Kawartha 250 | Steven Mathews | D. J. Kennington | D. J. Kennington | Dodge |

=== Standings ===
(key) Bold – Pole position awarded by time. Italics – Pole position earned by points standings. * – Most laps led.

| Pos | Driver | MSP | ICAR | DEL | MSP | TOR | VER | SAS | CTR | CGV | BAR | ANT | KAW | Pts |
|---|---|---|---|---|---|---|---|---|---|---|---|---|---|---|
| 1 | Scott Steckly | 1* | 2 | 2 | 5 | 2 | **1** | 20 | 3 | 7 | **14*** | **1*** | 2 | 1960 |
| 2 | D. J. Kennington | 5 | 20 | 3 | 1 | 5 | 2* | **2*** | 9 | 18 | 7 | 4 | 1* | 1881 |
| 3 | J. R. Fitzpatrick | **7** | 7 | 5 | 2* | 19 | 8 | 9 | 15 | 6 | 9 | 6 | 3 | 1774 |
| 4 | Kerry Micks | 13 | 19 | 6 | 13 | 4 | 3 | 4 | 21 | 2 | 3 | 5 | 4 | 1754 |
| 5 | Don Thomson Jr. | 3 | 3 | 1 | 26 | 8 | 6 | 3 | 16 | 14 | 4 | 15 | 6 | 1731 |
| 6 | Mark Dilley | 18 | 5 | 11 | 20 | 6 | 5 | 5 | 19 | 23 | 1 | 10 | 5 | 1631 |
| 7 | Ron Beauchamp Jr. | 9 | 14 | 9 | 15 | 11 | 4 | 7 | 14 | 12 | 15 | 8 | 17 | 1571 |
| 8 | Jason White | 15 | 10 | 10 | 6 | 25 | 11 | 19 | 6 | 15 | 18 | 16 | 8 | 1499 |
| 9 | Jason Hathaway | 6 | 15 | 8 | 21 | 20 | 18 | 6 | 26 | 32 | 2 | 7 | 21 | 1450 |
| 10 | Dexter Stacey | 16 | 23 | 15 | 7 | 12 | 16 | 17 | 25 | 16 | 12 | 18 | 11 | 1396 |
| 11 | Jeff Lapcevich | 8 | 6 | 13 | 4 | 13 | | | 4 | 4 | 5 | | 9 | 1313 |
| 12 | Isabelle Tremblay **(R)** | 14 | 25 | | 8 | 28 | 19 | 14 | 30 | 29 | 11 | 13 | 20 | 1163 |
| 13 | Louis-Philippe Dumoulin **(R)** | | 4 | | 23 | 7 | | | 5 | 10 | 13 | 17 | 16 | 1045 |
| 14 | Peter Shepherd III | 2 | | **17** | | | 7 | 1 | | | 21 | 2 | 10 | 1042 |
| 15 | Noel Dowler **(R)** | | 27 | | 16 | 22 | 17 | 13 | 28 | 20 | 17 | 11 | 25 | 1042 |
| 16 | Derek White | 12 | 13 | 20 | | 16 | | | 7 | 25 | | 14 | 26 | 909 |
| 17 | Steven Mathews **(R)** | 10 | 18 | 4 | 25 | 30 | | | | 35 | 16 | | **7** | 893 |
| 18 | Hugo Vannini **(R)** | 19 | | 16 | | 33 | | | 23 | 30 | 22 | 19 | 19 | 761 |
| 19 | Robin Buck | | 1 | | 3 | 3 | | | 1* | 13 | | | | 734 |
| 20 | John Farano **(R)** | | 9 | | 24 | 18 | | | 8 | 8 | 19 | | | 728 |
| 21 | Brad Graham | 4 | | 7 | | 10 | | | | | 6 | | 24 | 681 |
| 22 | Andrew Ranger | | 21 | | | 1* | | | **2** | **1*** | | | | 660 |
| 23 | Jarrad Whissell | | | | 12 | 14 | 20 | 21 | 24 | 34 | | | | 603 |
| 24 | Dave Connelly **(R)** | 17 | | 14 | | 15 | | | 10 | 22 | | | | 582 |
| 25 | Jean-François Dumoulin | | 22 | | 22 | 17 | | | 12 | 9 | | | | 571 |
| 26 | Pete Klutt | | 11 | | 18 | 9 | | | 18 | 33 | | | | 550 |
| 27 | Joey McColm | | | | 10 | 31 | | | | 31 | 8 | | 13 | 540 |
| 28 | Pierre Bourque | | | | | 27 | 13 | 12 | 31 | | 20 | | | 506 |
| 29 | Elie Arseneau **(R)** | | 12 | | | 24 | | | 17 | 19 | | | | 436 |
| 30 | Martin Roy **(R)** | | 26 | | 14 | | | | 13 | 21 | | | | 430 |
| 31 | Howie Scannell Jr. | | | | 9 | 32 | | | 11 | 37 | | | | 387 |
| 32 | David Thorndyke | | | | 17 | 23 | | | 27 | 27 | | | | 370 |
| 33 | Donald Chisholm | | | 19 | | | | | | | | 3 | 22 | 368 |
| 34 | Chris Raabe **(R)** | | | | | | | | | | 10 | 9 | 23 | 366 |
| 35 | Trevor Seibert | | | | 19 | | 15 | | | 11 | | | | 354 |
| 36 | James Van Domselaar | | | | | 26 | 12 | 10 | | | | | | 346 |
| 37 | Alex Tagliani | | **8*** | | | | | | | 5 | | | | 307 |
| 38 | Patrice Brisebois **(R)** | | 17 | | | | | | 22 | 28 | | | | 288 |
| 39 | Nathan Weenk **(R)** | | | | | | 9 | 11 | | | | | | 268 |
| 40 | Michel Pilon **(R)** | | 24 | | | | | | 32 | 26 | | | | 243 |
| 41 | Nick Jewell **(R)** | | | | | | | 15 | | | | | 15 | 236 |
| 42 | Dave Coursol **(R)** | | 16 | | | | | | 20 | | | | | 218 |
| 43 | Shannon Harding **(R)** | | | | | | 21 | 18 | | | | | | 209 |
| 44 | Ray Courtemanche Jr. **(R)** | | | | | 29 | | | 29 | 36 | | | | 207 |
| 45 | Donald Theetge **(R)** | | | | | | | | 33 | 17 | | | | 176 |
| 46 | Jason Bowles | | | | | **21** | | | | 3 | | | | 170 |
| 47 | Dan Shirley **(R)** | | | | | | | 8 | | | | | | 142 |
| 48 | Jim White | | | | | | 10 | | | | | | | 134 |
| 49 | Pete Vanderwyst **(R)** | 11 | | | | | | | | | | | | 130 |
| 50 | Steve Côté **(R)** | | | | 11 | | | | | | | | | 130 |
| 51 | Kenny Forth **(R)** | | | 12 | | | | | | | | | | 127 |
| 52 | John Flemming **(R)** | | | | | | | | | | | 12 | | 127 |
| 53 | John Fletcher **(R)** | | | | | | | | | | | | 12 | 127 |
| 54 | Sarah Cornett-Ching **(R)** | | | | | | 14 | | | | | | | 121 |
| 55 | Brandon White **(R)** | | | | | | | | | | | | 14 | 121 |
| 56 | Ryley Seibert **(R)** | | | | | | | 16 | | | | | | 115 |
| 57 | Doug Brown | | | 18 | | | | | | | | | | 109 |
| 58 | Trevor Monaghan | | | | | | | | | | | | 18 | 109 |
| 59 | Sebastien Dussault **(R)** | | | | | | | | | 24 | | | | 91 |
| Pos | Driver | MSP | ICAR | DEL | MSP | TOR | VER | SAS | CTR | CGV | BAR | ANT | KAW | Pts |
| | References | | | | | | | | | | | | | |

== See also ==
- 2011 NASCAR Sprint Cup Series
- 2011 NASCAR Nationwide Series
- 2011 NASCAR Camping World Truck Series
- 2011 ARCA Racing Series
- 2011 NASCAR Whelen Modified Tour
- 2011 NASCAR Whelen Southern Modified Tour
- 2011 NASCAR Corona Series
- 2011 NASCAR Stock V6 Series
