= 2012 NASCAR Canadian Tire Series =

2012 NASCAR Canadian Tire Series season
- NASCAR Canadian Tire Series
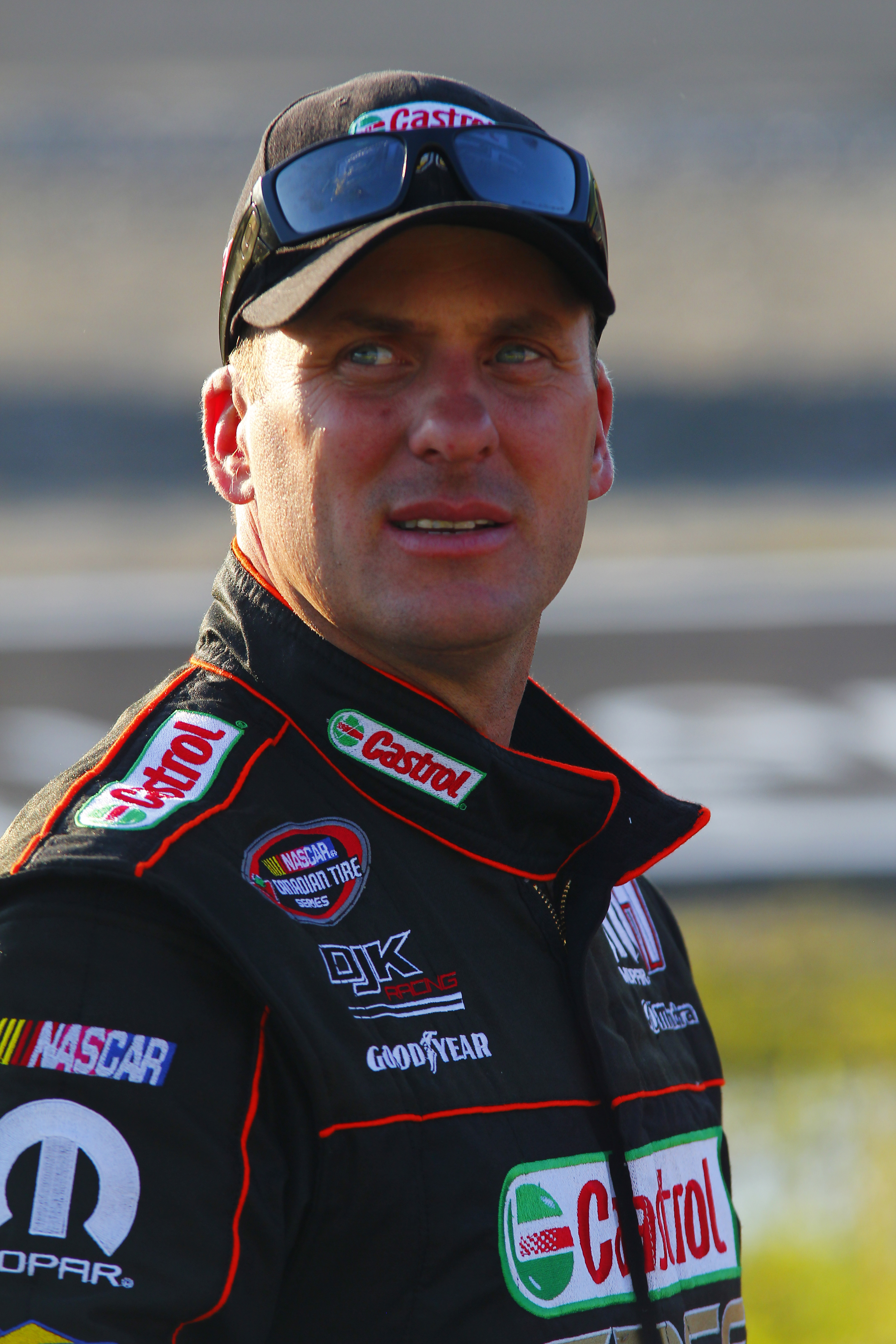

Season
- Races: 12
- Start date: May 20
- End date: September 22

Awards
- Champion: D. J. Kennington

The 2012 NASCAR Canadian Tire Series was the sixth season of the NASCAR Canadian Tire Series taking place in the summer of 2012. The season composed of twelve races at eleven different venues. Seven of those events were contested on oval courses.

== Summary ==
The sixth season consisted of 12 events spanning across 5 provinces featuring 12 events. New this season were the standardised rule changes for NASCAR's regional series matching that of the national series (green-white-checker finish and points system). All of the races were aired on TSN in one-hour tape-delayed episodes, excluding Circuit Gilles Villeneuve and Trois-Rivières being aired live on the network.

The season started on May 20 at the Canadian Tire Motorsport Park with J. R. Fitzpatrick winning his first event in almost 2 years, Andrew Ranger also returned to victory lane the following week at Circuit ICAR. D. J. Kennington went to win a NASCAR touring record of 5 consecutive races at Canadian Tire Motorsport Park, Delaware Speedway, Motoplex Speedway, Edmonton Indy and Auto Clearing Motor Speedway. Ranger and Fitzpatrick won the two premier road course events at Circuit Trois-Rivières and Circuit Gilles Villeneuve in August. Then at Barrie Speedway, Peter Shepherd III took advantage of an accident involving leaders Steve Matthews and Fitzpatrick, who were involved in an accident on a green-white-checker finish to pick up the Victory. Points leader Kennington suffered a mechanical failure and finished down in the running order but rebounded strong winning the final two events of the year at Kawartha and Riverside capturing 2 championships in 3 years.

== Drivers ==
Number	Driver	Maker	Owner	Chief Crew
02	Kerry Micks	Ford	Susan Micks	Tyler Case
02	Mark Dilley	Ford	Susan Micks	Rino Montanari
03	Elie Arseneau	Chevrolet	Jason Roussakis	TBA
3	Jason Hathaway	Dodge	Ed Hakonson	Craig Masters
04	Jean-François Dumoulin	Dodge	Paul Corbeil	Tony Pratte
5	Noel Dowler	Dodge	Kevin Dowler	TBA
07	Isabelle Tremblay	Ford	Dave Jacombs	TBA
7	Peter Shepherd III	Dodge	Sharon Shepherd	Don Jacobson
15	Steven Mathews	Ford	Bill Mathews	Rick McColl
17	D. J. Kennington	Dodge	Doug Kennington	Dave Wight
19	Brad Graham	Dodge	Reg Arsenault	Bill Dobson
21	Jason White	Dodge	Melissa Mckenzie	Derek Lynch
22	Scott Steckly	Dodge	Scott Steckly	Giulio Montanari
23	Jeff Lapcevich	Dodge	Joe Lapcevich	Tim Ellas
27	Andrew Ranger	Dodge	Dave Jacombs	TBA
42	Peter Klutt	Chevrolet	Peter Klutt	Ken Stewart
44	Jarrad Whissell	Ford	Brian Whissell	Donald Barhardt
47	Louis-Philippe Dumoulin	Dodge	Marc-Andre Bergeron	Jimmy Briere
50	Joey McColm	Dodge	John Atto	TBA
55	Dexter Stacey	Dodge	Kristin Hamelin	TBA
56	Howie Scannell Jr.	Dodge	James Bray	Kevin Blacklock
60	Ron Beauchamp Jr.	Dodge	Ronald Beauchamp Sr.	TBA
66	Robin Buck	Dodge	Sandra D'Angelo	TBA
81	Larry Jackson	Dodge	Brian Barton	Ron Easton
82	Dave Connelly	Dodge	David Connelly	Mike Kenyon
84	J. R. Fitzpatrick	Chevrolet	John Fitzpatrick	Don Thomson Jr.
89	Donald Chisholm	Ford	John Chisholm	George Koszkulics
94	Dave Coursol	Dodge	Andre Coursol	Richard Houle
97	Hugo Vannini	Ford	Yvon Vannini	Yvon Vannini
99	Derek White	Chevrolet	Derek White	Jonathan Cote

== Schedule ==
2012 venues

Race	Name	Track	Track Type	Date
1	Vortex Brake Pads 200	Canadian Tire Motorsport Park, Bowmanville	Road	May 20
2	ICAR Lucas Oil Grand Prix	Circuit ICAR, Mirabel	Road	June 3
3	Clarington 200	Canadian Tire Motorsport Park, Bowmanville	Oval	June 16
4	EMCO 200	Delaware Speedway, Delaware	Oval	June 23
5	A&W Crusin' the Dub 300	Motoplex Speedway, Vernon	Oval	July 14
6	Rexall 100	Edmonton Indy, Edmonton	Street	July 22
7	Velocity Prairie Thunder	Auto Clearing Motor Speedway, Saskatoon	Oval	July 25
8	JuliaWine.com 100	Circuit Trois-Rivières, Trois-Rivières	Street	August 5
9	NAPA Autopro 100	Circuit Gilles Villeneuve, Montreal	Road	August 18
10	Wahta Springs 300	Barrie Speedway, Barrie	Oval	September 8
11	Wilson Equipment 300	Riverside Speedway, Antigonish	Oval	September 15
12	Pinty's 250	Kawartha Speedway, Peterborough	Oval	September 22

== Results ==
=== Races ===
Race	Name	Pole position	Most laps led	Winning driver	Manufacturer
1	Vortex Brake Pads 200	Scott Steckly	J. R. Fitzpatrick	J. R. Fitzpatrick	Chevrolet
2	ICAR Lucas Oil Grand Prix	Scott Steckly ‡	Andrew Ranger	Andrew Ranger	Dodge
3	Clarington 200	Peter Shepherd III	D. J. Kennington	D. J. Kennington	Dodge
4	EMCO 200	D. J. Kennington	D. J. Kennington	D. J. Kennington	Dodge
5	A&W Crusin' the Dub 300	Ron Beauchamp Jr.	D. J. Kennington	D. J. Kennington	Dodge
6	Rexall 100	Scott Steckly	Scott Steckly	D. J. Kennington	Dodge
7	Velocity Prairie Thunder	J. R. Fitzpatrick	J. R. Fitzpatrick	D. J. Kennington	Dodge
8	JuliaWine.com 100	Louis-Philippe Dumoulin	Andrew Ranger	Andrew Ranger	Dodge
9	NAPA Autopro 100	J. R. Fitzpatrick	J. R. Fitzpatrick	J. R. Fitzpatrick	Chevrolet
10	Wahta Springs 300	Steven Mathews	Peter Shepherd III	Peter Shepherd III	Dodge
11	Wilson Equipment 300	J. R. Fitzpatrick	D. J. Kennington	D. J. Kennington	Dodge
12	Pinty's 250	J. R. Fitzpatrick	D. J. Kennington	D. J. Kennington	Dodge

=== Final championship standings ===
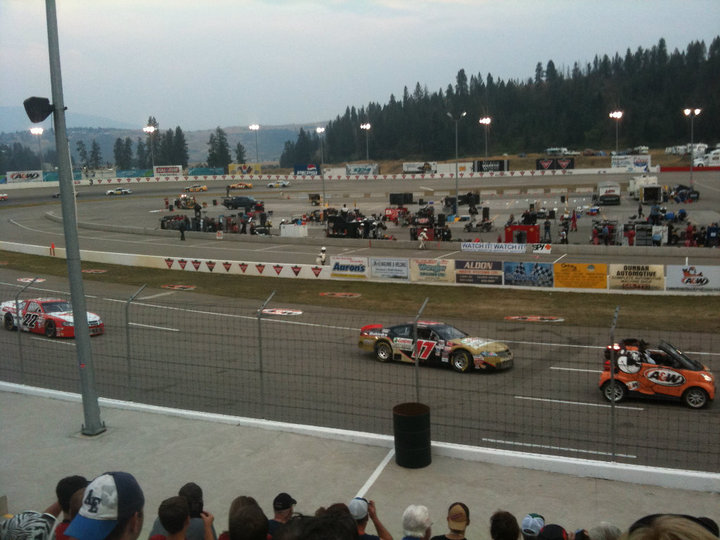
The Canadian Tire Series leaders following the pace car at Motoplex Speedway in July 2012.

(key) Bold – Pole position awarded by time. Italics – Pole position earned by points standings. * – Most laps led.

Pos	Driver	MSP	ICAR	MSP	DEL	VER	EDM	SAS	CTR	CGV	BAR	ANT	KAW	Pts
1	D. J. Kennington	2	5	1*	**1***	1*	1	1	5	5	21	1*	1*	517
2	J. R. Fitzpatrick	1*	2	3	14	4	17	**3***	3	**1***	6	**2**	**3**	490
3	Andrew Ranger	4	1*	7	4	11	7	6	1*	2	2	12	2	482
4	Scott Steckly	**3**	3	14	2	3	**4***	4	7	4	9	4	6	471
5	Ron Beauchamp Jr.	11	9	8	11	**8**	8	8	8	14	7	5	11	422
6	Louis-Philippe Dumoulin	5	4	12	10	9	20	7	**2**	33	11	11	10	396
7	Jason Hathaway	6	23	5	3	2	2	21	15	26	7	17	12	390
8	Martin Roy **(R)**	18	10	19	12	6	5	10	24	12	18	8	5	383
9	Jason White	12	13	11	6	5	14	20	21	13	17	7	14	375
10	Noel Dowler	26	18	10	9	10	11	16	19	18	3	9	24	355
11	Michael Scholz **(R)**	24	22	21	21	16	16	12	18	25	15	15	26	297
12	Jeff Lapcevich	8	8	4	19				9	19	12		8	265
13	Mark Dilley			2	7	13		2			20	3	7	255
14	Larry Jackson **(R)**	16	12	17	18				27	22	10	13	13	248
15	Hugo Vannini	23	17	18	22				17	21	22	16	19	221
16	Ray Courtemanche Jr. **(R)**	27	15	15	16				26	32	19	14	18	214
17	Joey McColm	25		13	8		13			29	13	20	28	203
18	Kerry Micks	7	21				6		12	10		18		190
19	Howie Scannell Jr.	13	16	20	15				16	24	Wth		17	187
20	Steven Mathews	20		6	17					15	**4**		23	181
21	Jarrad Whissell	19	20			17	9	11		27			25	180
22	Isabelle Tremblay	21	25						10	DNQ^{2}	16	10	16	171
23	Robin Buck	9	26				12		4	3				167
24	Peter Shepherd III			**16**	5						1*		4	155
25	Dave Connelly		29		13				29	DNQ^{2}	14	19	15	151
26	Trevor Seibert					12	3	22		8				131
27	Derek White	14	24						14	23			22	123
28	Ryley Seibert **(R)**					18	10	13		16				119
29	Steve Côté **(R)**	22	11	9	20									114
30	Dexter Stacey		27						23	31	5		27	107
31	Peter Klutt	10							11	11				100
32	Dave Coursol **(R)**	15	14						25	DNQ^{2}				87
33	Jean-François Dumoulin		7						6	34				85
34	James Van Domselaar					15	19	19						79
35	Elie Arseneau **(R)**		28						30	20			20	78
36	Jim White					7		5						76
37	Donald Chisholm											6	9	73
38	Alex Labbé **(R)**		6						31	30				65
39	Bob DeLorme **(R)**					14		15						59
40	David Thorndyke	17							20	DNQ^{2}				58
41	Kevin Dowler **(R)**					19	15							54
42	Jason Hankewich **(R)**					20		17						51
43	Patrice Brisebois								22	17				49
44	Timmy Hill									6				38
45	Austin Dillon									7				37
46	Michel Pilon		19						Wth^{1}					37
47	Nick Jewell **(R)**							9						35
48	Xavier Coupal **(R)**									9				35
49	Benoit Theetge **(R)**								28	28				32
50	François Lessard **(R)**								13					31
51	Dan Shirley **(R)**							14						30
52	Todd Nichol						18							26
53	Nathan Weenk							18						26
54	Kelly Admiraal **(R)**						21							23
55	Max Papis												21	23
56	Brandon White **(R)**									DNQ^{2}				8
Pos	Driver	MSP	ICAR	MSP	DEL	VER	EDM	SAS	CTR	CGV	BAR	ANT	KAW	Pts

- ^{1} – Michel Pilon received championship points, despite the fact that he withdrew from the race after an injury in practice.
- ^{2} – Dave Coursol, Brandon White, David Thorndyke, Dave Connelly and Isabelle Tremblay received championship points despite the fact that they did not qualify for the race.

== See also ==
- 2012 NASCAR Sprint Cup Series
- 2012 NASCAR Nationwide Series
- 2012 NASCAR Camping World Truck Series
- 2012 NASCAR K&N Pro Series East
- 2012 ARCA Racing Series
- 2012 NASCAR Whelen Modified Tour
- 2012 NASCAR Whelen Southern Modified Tour
- 2012 NASCAR Toyota Series
- 2012 NASCAR Stock V6 Series
- 2012 Racecar Euro Series
