= Howie Scannell Jr. =

Canadian racing driver (born 1966)

- Born: January 13, 1966 (age 60); Milton, Ontario, Canada

NASCAR Canada Series career
- 32 races run over 6 years
- Car no., team: No. 85 (Larry Jackson Racing)
- 2026 position: 20th
- Best finish: 19th (2012)
- First race: 2009 Dickies 200 (Mosport)
- Last race: 2026 NTN BCA 200 (Delaware)
Wins	Top tens	Poles
0	3	0
- Statistics up to date as of September 13, 2026.

Howie Scannell Jr. (born January 13, 1966) is a Canadian professional stock car racing driver and crew chief. He competes part-time in the NASCAR Canada Series, driving the No. 85 Dodge for Larry Jackson Racing. He is the son of fellow driver Howie Scannell Sr. and father of fellow driver Matthew Scannell.

== Racing career ==
Scannell began racing in CASCAR and ACT in the 1990s, debuting in the CASCAR Eastern Series in 1991 and the ACT Pro Stock Tour in 1992, and later the CASCAR Super Series in 1999. Between 1999 and 2005, Scannell competed in twelve CASCAR Super Series races, scoring two top-tens in 2005.

Scannell debuted in the NASCAR Canadian Tire Series in 2009, driving the No. 56 Dodge for Jim Bray, where he finished ninth in his debut at Canadian Tire Motorsport Park. He ran four more races across the season, finishing top-20 in each of them. Scannell returned to the No. 56 in 2010, scoring a best finish of twelfth at Exhibition Place. He drove the No. 56 in four races in 2011, finishing ninth at Canadian Tire Motorsport Park as he had in his debut and finishing 11th at Circuit Trois-Rivières, however in his other two starts at Exhibition Place and Circuit Gilles Villeneuve, he would complete zero and one lap respectively due to mechanical issues. In 2012, Scannell Jr. competed in seven of twelve races, scoring a best finish of 13th at Canadian Tire Motorsport Park and finishing a career-best 19th in the standings. He would run six races in 2013, finishing ninth at CTMP for the third time and finishing 20th in points. During this season, his son Matthew also began competing in the series for Jim Bray. For 2014, Scannell vacated the No. 56 for his son to compete, instead serving as the crew chief for the car. Scannell continued to serve as a crew chief across multiple seasons for Matthew Scannell as well as other drivers such as Larry Jackson.

In 2026, after nearly 13 years away from driving in NASCAR, Scannell returned to the now NASCAR Canada Series at Riverside International Speedway, driving the No. 85 Dodge for Larry Jackson Racing. He would retire from the event after 22 laps and finish in sixteenth. He then competed in the doubleheaders at Autodrome Montmagny and Edmonton International Raceway; the second race at Montmagny saw him run a season-high 44 laps before exiting the race with mechanical issues, finishing 17th.

== Motorsports career results ==
=== NASCAR ===
(key) (Bold – Pole position awarded by qualifying time. Italics – Pole position earned by points standings or practice time. * – Most laps led.)

==== Canada Series ====
NASCAR Canada Series results
Year	Team	No.	Make	1	2	3	4	5	6	7	8	9	10	11	12	13	14	NCSC	Pts	Ref
2009	Bray Autosport	56	Dodge	ASE	DEL	MSP; 9	ASE	MPS	EDM	SAS	MSP	CTR; 20	CGV; 15	BAR; 14	RIS	KWA; 13		21st	606	
2010	Bray Autosport	56	Dodge	DEL	MSP; 14	ASE	TOR; 12	EDM	MPS	SAS	CTR; 27	MSP	CGV; 33	BAR	RIS	KWA		28th	394	
2011	Bray Autosport	56	Dodge	MSP	ICAR	DEL	MSP; 9	TOR; 32	MPS	SAS	CTR; 11	CGV; 37	BAR	RIS	KWA			31st	387	
2012	Bray Autosport	56	Dodge	MSP; 13	ICAR; 16	MSP; 20	DEL; 15	MPS	EDM	SAS	CTR; 16	CGV; 24	BAR; Wth	RIS	KWA; 17			19th	187	
2013	Bray Autosport	56	Dodge	MSP; 21	DEL	MSP	ICAR; 13	MPS	SAS		CTR; 25	RIS	MSP; 9					20th	163	
2013	Bray Autosport	98	Dodge							ASE; 19				BAR; 14	KWA			20th	163	
2026	Larry Jackson Racing	85	Dodge	MSP	ACD	ACD	RIS; 16	AMS; 21	AMS; 17	CMP	EIR; 14	EIR; 14	CTR	MAR	ICAR	MSP	DEL; 18	20th	164	

=== CASCAR ===
==== Super Series ====
CASCAR Super Series results
Year	Team	No.	Make	1	2	3	4	5	6	7	8	9	10	11	12	CSSC	Pts	Ref
1999	Unknown	99	Chevy	CAL	EDM	MSP; 20	DEL									NA	NA	
2000	Unknown	0	Chevy	EDM	CAL	MSP; 32	DEL									NA	NA	
2001	Bray Autosport	56	Chevy	DEL	PET	MSP	MSP	KWA	TOR; 35	ASE	CTR	HAM	CAL	VAN	DEL	57th	194	
2002	Unknown	6	Chevy	DEL	PET	ASE	MSP	MSP	HAM	TOR; 24	CAL	VAN	MNT	KWA; 22	DEL; 16	47th	346	
2003	Unknown	6	Chevy	DEL	PET	MSP	HAM	TOR; 12	CAL	VAN	ASE	MSP	DEL	PET	HAM; 31	55th	128	
2005	Unknown	0	Chevy	DEL	ASE	MSP; 10	BAR	TOR; 6	RCS	MPS	MOS	PET	DEL	HAM; 25	KWA; 14	27th	498	
