= D. J. Kennington =

Canadian racing driver (born 1977)

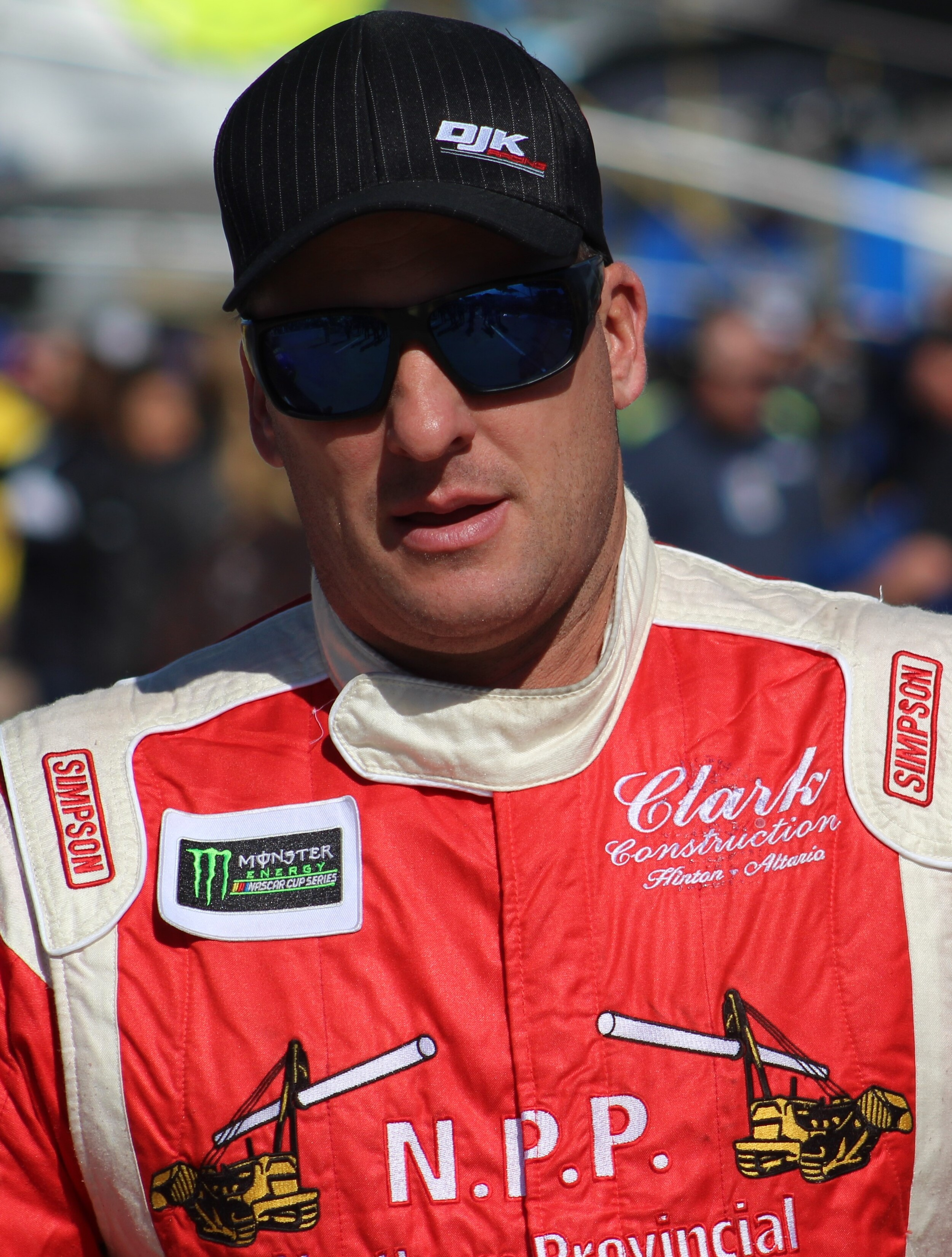
- Kennington at Martinsville Speedway in 2018
- Born: Douglas James Kennington; July 15, 1977 (age 49); St. Thomas, Ontario, Canada
- Achievements: 2010, 2012 NASCAR Canadian Tire Series Champion
- Awards: 2008 NASCAR Canadian Tire Series Most Popular Driver

NASCAR Cup Series career
- 16 races run over 4 years
- 2019 position: 62nd
- Best finish: 39th (2017)
- First race: 2016 Can-Am 500 (Phoenix)
- Last race: 2019 STP 500 (Martinsville)
Wins	Top tens	Poles
0	0	0

NASCAR O'Reilly Auto Parts Series career
- 51 races run over 8 years
- 2019 position: 102nd
- Best finish: 24th (2008)
- First race: 2006 Sam's Town 250 (Memphis)
- Last race: 2019 NASCAR Racing Experience 300 (Daytona)
Wins	Top tens	Poles
0	0	0

NASCAR FedEx Freight Truck Series career
- 12 races run over 6 years
- 2019 position: 72nd
- Best finish: 40th (2018)
- First race: 2010 Kroger 250 (Martinsville)
- Last race: 2019 Chevrolet Silverado 250 (Mosport)
Wins	Top tens	Poles
0	0	0

NASCAR Canada Series career
- 242 races run over 20 years
- Car no., team: No. 51 (Rick Ware Racing)
- 2026 position: 4th
- Best finish: 1st (2010, 2012)
- First race: 2007 Dodge Dealers 200 (Cayuga)
- Last race: 2026 NTN BCA 200 (Delaware)
- First win: 2007 Mopar 300 (Barrie)
- Last win: 2025 NASCAR Canada 300 (Riverside)
Wins	Top tens	Poles
25	203	17
- Statistics up to date as of September 12, 2026.

Douglas James Kennington (born July 15, 1977) is a Canadian professional stock car racing driver. He currently competes full-time in the NASCAR Canada Series, driving the No. 51 Chevrolet for Rick Ware Racing.

Kennington won the 2010 and 2012 Canada Series championships. He also previously competed part-time in the NASCAR Cup Series, NASCAR Xfinity Series, and the NASCAR Gander Outdoors Truck Series. He is the son of Doug Kennington, a former CASCAR driver and founder of St. Thomas Raceway Park.

== Racing career ==
=== Cup Series ===
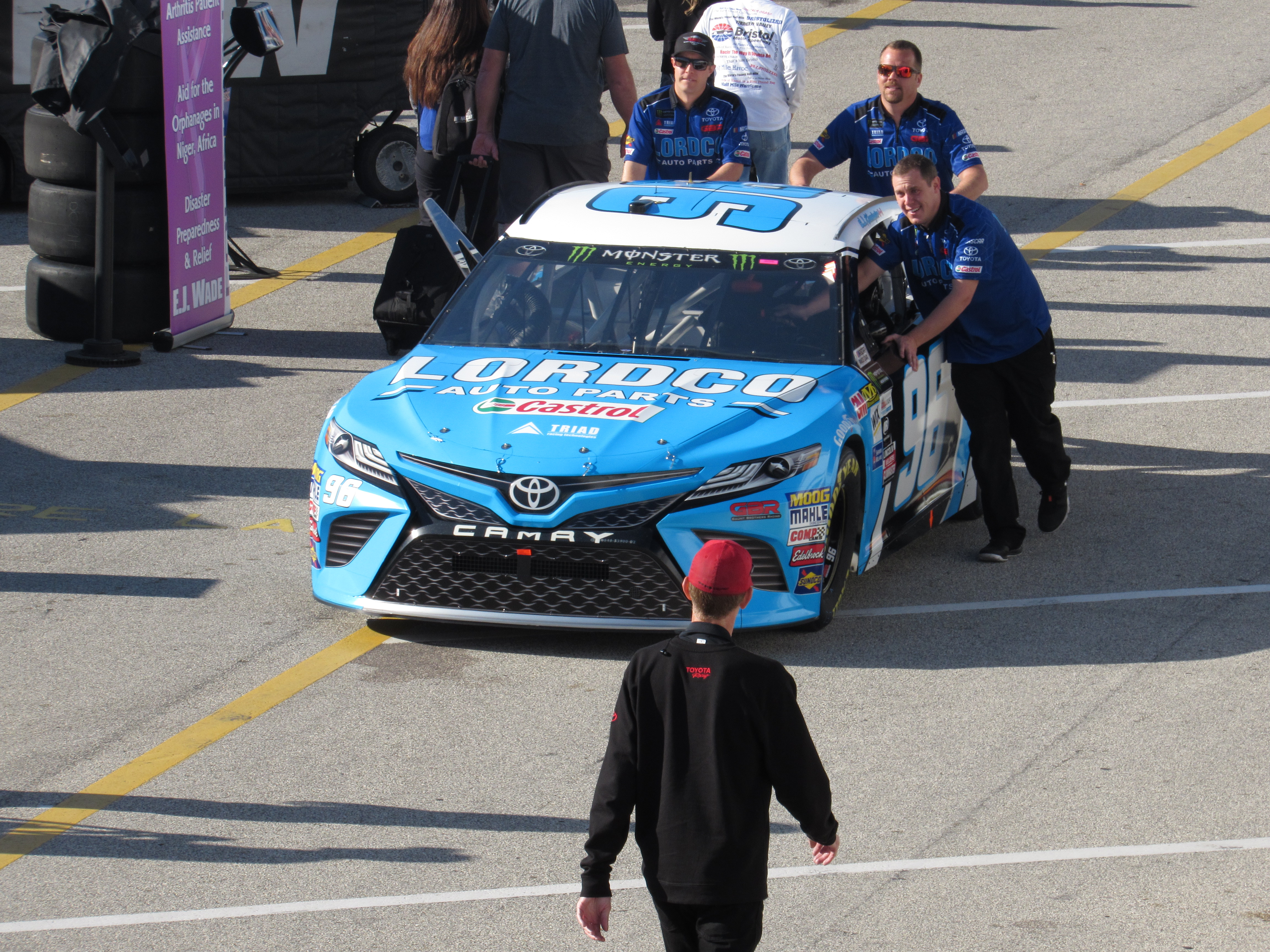
Kennington's car at Daytona International Speedway.

Kennington made his Sprint Cup Series debut at the 2016 Can-Am 500 at Phoenix in the No. 55 for Premium Motorsports, where he finished 35th. In 2017, he joined newly-formed Gaunt Brothers Racing to run the Daytona 500 in the No. 96 Toyota Camry. He qualified in 28th after racing his way in during the second Can-Am Duel qualifying race, but got collected in a sixteen-car crash on lap 129. He attempted to qualify again for the team at Talladega, but failed to do so. He ran the No. 15 Premium Motorsports at Daytona in July.

In 2018, Kennington returned to Gaunt Brothers Racing, with the team attempting a part-time schedule in the No. 96. At Bristol, Kennington, who is Canadian, ran a paint scheme in memoriam following the Humboldt Broncos bus crash. He finished 27th in the tribute car, with the hood being auctioned for charity. For the FireKeepers Casino 400 at Michigan, Kennington drove the No. 7 for Premium Motorsports.

For the 2019 STP 500, Kennington joined Spire Motorsports' No. 77 Chevrolet.

=== Xfinity Series ===
In 2007–2009, Kennington ran the Nationwide Series part-time for MacDonald Motorsports in a Dodge Charger. He has over 30 starts but has never cracked the top-ten. His career best NASCAR Nationwide Series finish was an 11th place finish driving for Rensi-Hamilton in the Del Monte Ford in the 2010 race in Montreal. Kennington has also raced for Jennifer Jo Cobb Racing in the NASCAR Nationwide Series in 2011 Montreal event.

=== Gander Outdoors Truck Series ===
In 2010, Kennington ran some races with Rick Ware Racing and finished seventeenth in his first Camping World Truck Series start at Martinsville Speedway.

In 2013, Kennington returned to the Camping World Truck Series at Phoenix International Raceway, driving the No. 1 Chevrolet Silverado for Rick Ware Racing; he finished last after an early accident. Three years later, Kennington ran two Truck races for Premium Motorsports at Canadian Tire Motorsports Park and Martinsville Speedway, finishing fourteenth and 23rd, respectively. In 2017, he and Gaunt Brothers Racing contested the Truck race at Mosport in the No. 96 Toyota Tundra. He rejoined Premium Motorsports' No. 15 truck at Talladega where he finished fifteenth.

In August 2019, Kennington replaced a suspended Tyler Dippel in the No. 02 Young's Motorsports truck at Mosport.

=== Canada Series ===
In 2007, Kennington drove the No. 17 Castrol sponsored car in the NASCAR Canadian Tire Series. He won both the Barrie Speedway races and a pole, ending up second in the points. Kennington struggled in the 2008 season with no wins. In 2009, he won at Delaware Speedway from pole and had a solid season including the pole at Riverside International Speedway and won the season finale at Kawartha Speedway, lead to him finishing second in points.

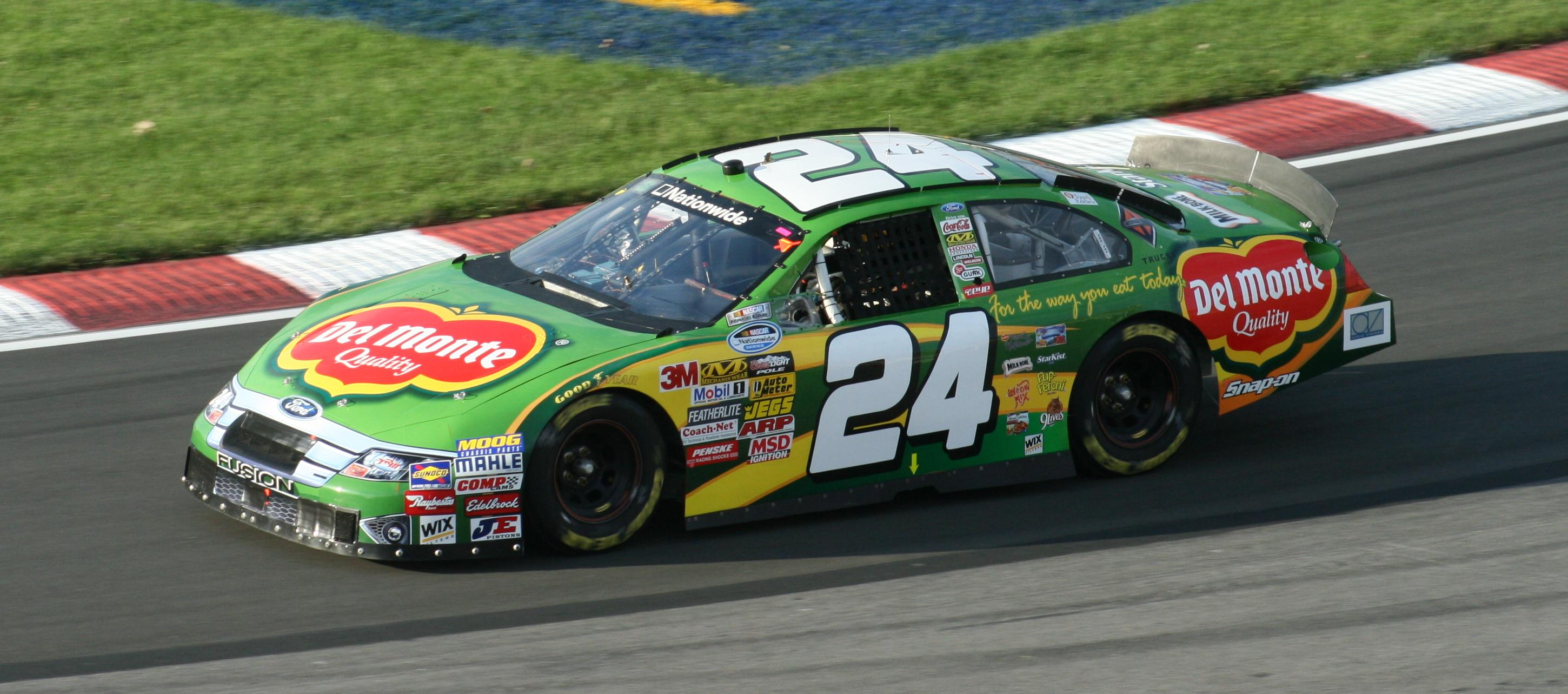
Kennington's 2010 Nationwide car at Circuit Gilles Villeneuve

He started off the 2010 season by defending his win at Delaware and picking up the pole for that event. Kennington won the third race of the year after leading only the last lap passing both Kerry Micks and Scott Steckly en route to victory at Autodrome Saint-Eustache. At Motoplex Speedway, he started on the pole and lead the majority of the race but lost to Steckly in the last few laps. Kennington picked up his third win from the pole at Saskatoon, but after problems in Montreal, Kennington fell back in the points. He won at Barrie Speedway and Riverside Speedway, retaking the points lead. A pole and a third-place finish at the final race at Kawartha Speedway would clinch his first ever NASCAR Championship and a spot in the Toyota Showdown. He would finish second to Jason Bowles, the highest finish for anyone from the Canadian Tire Series.

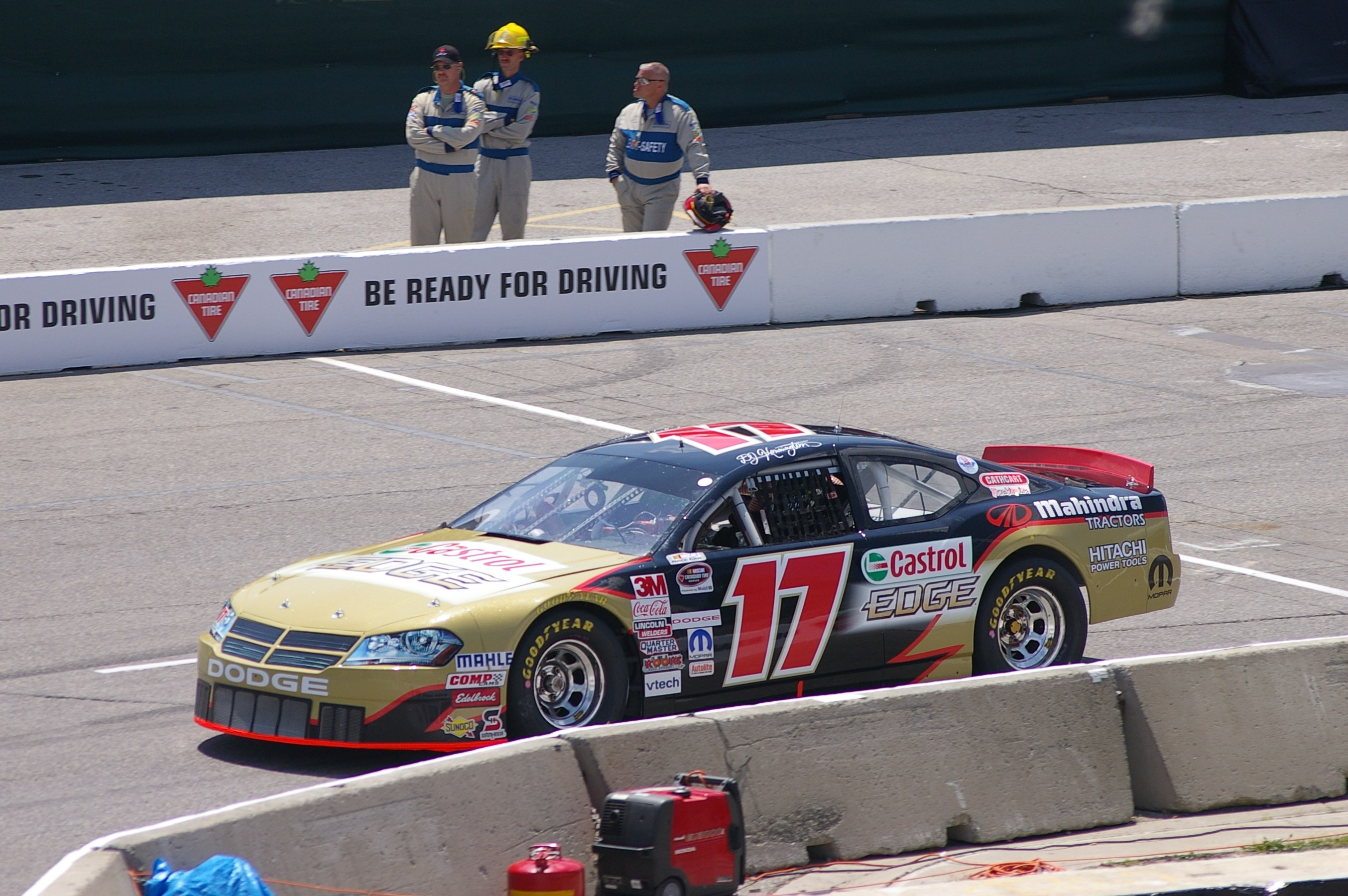
Kennington's 2010 NASCAR Canadian Tire Series championship car

During the 2011 season, Kennington won the events at Kawartha and Auto Clearing Speedway to finish Second in the Points standings. In the 2012 Canadian Tire season, Kennington went to win a NASCAR touring record of five consecutive races at Canadian Tire Motorsport Park, Delaware Speedway, Motoplex Speedway, Edmonton Indy and Auto Clearing Motor Speedway; he won seven total races during the season on his way to the 2012 series championship. At Jukasa Motor Speedway at the end of September 2018, Kennington claimed his first career win since 2013.

From 2014 to 2017, Kennington never missed a race, but he wasn't winning. He'd finish inside the top-ten in points.

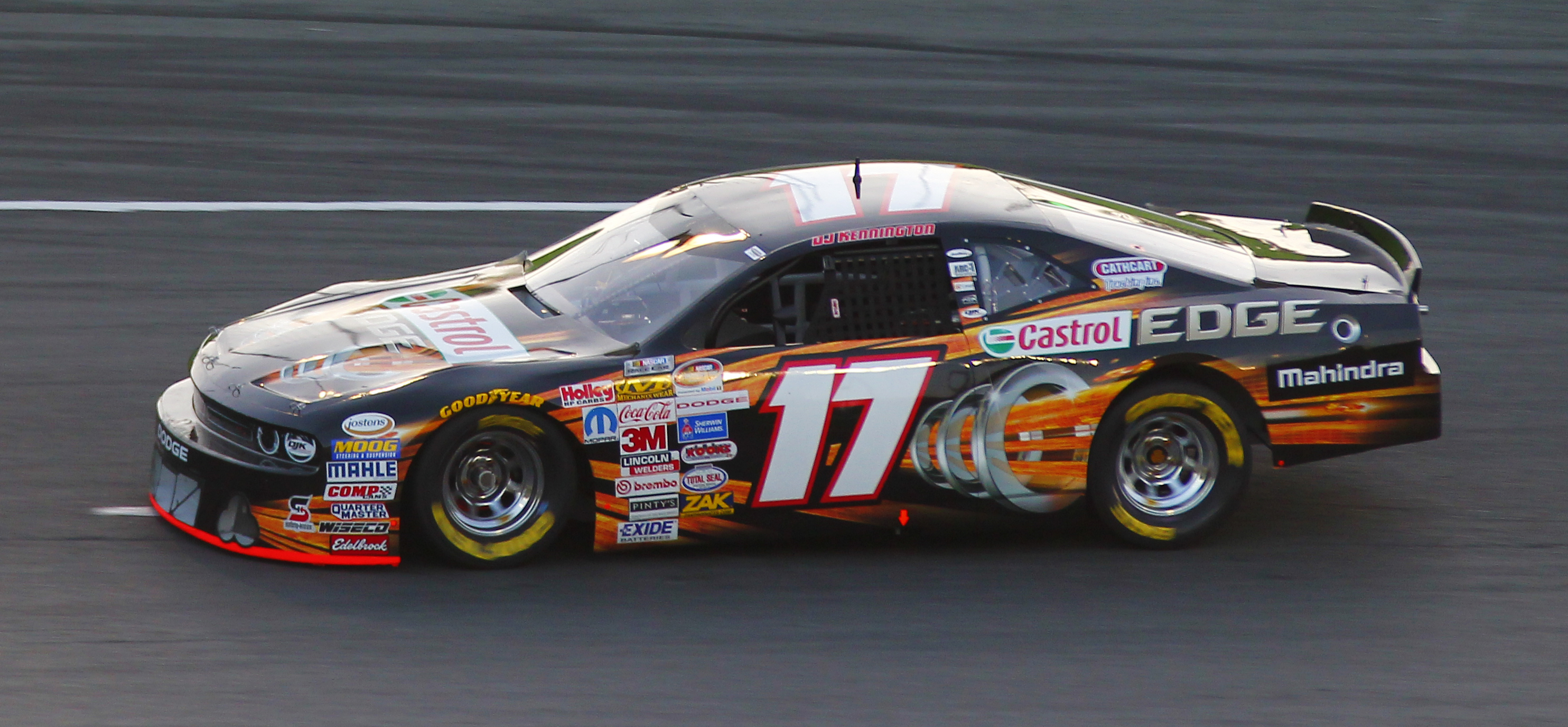
Autodrome Chaudière in 2015

In 2018, he won at Jukasa Motor Speedway for the second tome in his career. In the COVID-shortened 2020 season he won at Julasa again, and in 2021 he swept both Delaware races in one weekend.

From 2022–2024 he ran consistent, even with manufacturer changes from Dodge to Chevrolet.

The 2025 season began with a win at Riverside before running down down Marc-Antoine Camirand for the title all the way to the last race at Delaware. He came up short and finished 2nd for a record fourth time.

At the end of the 2026 season, it was announced that he would compete for Rick Ware Racing at the season finale at Delaware and from 2027 onwards.

=== CASCAR ===
Kennington made his debut in 1998 season, driving the No. 17 Castrol sponsored car for his own team. He ran full-time in CASCAR Super Series from 1998 season until 2006 season when NASCAR purchased CASCAR and created the NASCAR Canadian Tire Series for the 2007 season. Kennington had seven wins, 38 top-fives, 60 top-tens and seven pole-positions in 83 races. Kennington best championship result was runner-up in 2002 season.

=== Hooters Pro Cup Series ===
In 2004 and 2005, Kennington ran a partial schedule in the USAR Hooters Pro Cup Series as an owner/driver for DJK Racing.

== Motorsports career results ==
=== NASCAR ===
(key) (Bold – Pole position awarded by qualifying time. Italics – Pole position earned by points standings or practice time. * – Most laps led.)

==== Monster Energy Cup Series ====
Monster Energy NASCAR Cup Series results
Year	Team	No.	Make	1	2	3	4	5	6	7	8	9	10	11	12	13	14	15	16	17	18	19	20	21	22	23	24	25	26	27	28	29	30	31	32	33	34	35	36	MENCC	Pts	Ref
2016	Premium Motorsports	55	Chevy	DAY	ATL	LVS	PHO	CAL	MAR	TEX	BRI	RCH	TAL	KAN	DOV	CLT	POC	MCH	SON	DAY	KEN	NHA	IND	POC	GLN	BRI	MCH	DAR	RCH	CHI	NHA	DOV	CLT	KAN	TAL	MAR	TEX	PHO; 35	HOM	60th	0^{1}	
2017	Gaunt Brothers Racing	96	Toyota	DAY; 36	ATL	LVS	PHO	CAL	MAR	TEX	BRI	RCH	TAL; DNQ	KAN	CLT	DOV	POC	MCH	SON																					39th	17	
2017	Premium Motorsports	15	Toyota																	DAY; 38	KEN	NHA	IND	POC	GLN	MCH	BRI	DAR	RCH	CHI	NHA	DOV	CLT							39th	17	
2017	Premium Motorsports	55	Toyota																															TAL; 33	KAN	MAR	TEX			39th	17	
2017	Premium Motorsports	15	Chevy																																			PHO; 26	HOM	39th	17	
2018	Gaunt Brothers Racing	96	Toyota	DAY; 24	ATL	LVS	PHO; 31	CAL	MAR; 28	TEX	BRI; 27	RCH	TAL; 20	DOV	KAN	CLT	POC				DAY; 13	KEN	NHA	POC	GLN	MCH	BRI	DAR	IND	LVS	RCH	CLT	DOV			MAR; 27	TEX			53rd	0^{1}	
2018	Premium Motorsports	7	Chevy															MCH; 34	SON	CHI														TAL; 34	KAN			PHO; 27	HOM	53rd	0^{1}	
2019	Spire Motorsports	77	Chevy	DAY	ATL	LVS	PHO	CAL	MAR; 32	TEX	BRI	RCH	TAL	DOV	KAN	CLT	POC	MCH	SON	CHI	DAY	KEN	NHA	POC	GLN	MCH	BRI	DAR	IND	LVS	RCH	CLT	DOV	TAL	KAN	MAR	TEX	PHO	HOM	62nd	0^{1}	

===== Daytona 500 =====
Year	Team	Manufacturer	Start	Finish
2017	Gaunt Brothers Racing	Toyota	28	36
2018	Gaunt Brothers Racing	Toyota	30	24

==== Xfinity Series ====
NASCAR Xfinity Series results
Year	Team	No.	Make	1	2	3	4	5	6	7	8	9	10	11	12	13	14	15	16	17	18	19	20	21	22	23	24	25	26	27	28	29	30	31	32	33	34	35	NXSC	Pts	Ref
2006	MacDonald Motorsports	72	Chevy	DAY	CAL	MXC	LVS	ATL	BRI	TEX	NSH	PHO	TAL	RCH	DAR	CLT	DOV	NSH	KEN	MLW	DAY	CHI	NHA	MAR	GTY	IRP	GLN	MCH	BRI; DNQ	CAL	RCH	DOV	KAN	CLT					121st	82	
2006	MacDonald Motorsports	72	Dodge																																MEM; 27	TEX	PHO; DNQ	HOM; DNQ	121st	82	
2007	MacDonald Motorsports	72	Dodge	DAY	CAL	MXC	LVS	ATL	BRI	NSH	TEX	PHO; 27	TAL	RCH; 39	DAR	CLT	DOV; 23	NSH	KEN	MLW; 26	NHA	DAY	CHI	GTY	IRP; 25	CGV; 37	GLN	MCH	BRI; 30	CAL	RCH; 36	DOV	KAN; 29	CLT; DNQ	MEM; 43	TEX; DNQ	PHO; 43	HOM; DNQ	56th	719	
2008	MacDonald Motorsports	81	Dodge	DAY; 33	CAL; 26	LVS; 29	ATL; 34	BRI; 34	NSH; 34	TEX; 30	PHO; 26	MXC; 25	TAL; 26	RCH; 27	DAR; 20	CLT	DOV	NSH; 23	KEN; 26	MLW; 24	NHA	DAY; 29	CHI; 31	GTY	IRP	CGV; 27	GLN	MCH; 29	BRI; 29	CAL	RCH; 27	DOV	KAN	CLT; 25	MEM; 20	TEX; 31	PHO; 22	HOM; 26	24th	2099	
2009	MacDonald Motorsports	81	Dodge	DAY; 17	CAL; 24	LVS; 33	BRI	TEX	NSH	PHO; 23	TAL; 19	RCH; 24	DAR	CLT	DOV	NSH	KEN	MLW	NHA	DAY	CHI	GTY	IRP	IOW	GLN	MCH	BRI												66th	625	
2009	Specialty Racing	61	Ford																									CGV; 32	ATL	RCH	DOV	KAN	CAL	CLT	MEM	TEX	PHO	HOM	66th	625	
2010	Team Rensi Motorsports	24	Ford	DAY	CAL	LVS	BRI	NSH	PHO	TEX	TAL	RCH	DAR	DOV	CLT	NSH	KEN	ROA	NHA	DAY	CHI	GTY	IRP	IOW	GLN	MCH	BRI	CGV; 11	ATL	RCH	DOV	KAN	CAL	CLT	GTY	TEX	PHO	HOM	103rd	130	
2011	Jennifer Jo Cobb Racing	13	Dodge	DAY	PHO	LVS	BRI	CAL	TEX	TAL	NSH	RCH	DAR	DOV	IOW	CLT	CHI	MCH	ROA	DAY	KEN	NHA	NSH	IRP	IOW	GLN	CGV; 40	BRI	ATL	RCH	CHI	DOV	KAN	CLT	TEX				75th	15	
2011	MacDonald Motorsports	80	Dodge																																	PHO; 33	HOM		75th	15	
2016	MBM Motorsports	13	Dodge	DAY	ATL	LVS	PHO; 36	CAL	TEX	BRI	RCH	TAL	DOV	CLT	POC	MCH	IOW	DAY	KEN	NHA	IND	IOW	GLN	MOH	BRI	ROA	DAR	RCH	CHI	KEN	DOV	CLT	KAN	TEX					69th	16	
2016	B. J. McLeod Motorsports	15	Ford																																PHO; 30	HOM			69th	16	
2019	B. J. McLeod Motorsports	99	Toyota	DAY; 33	ATL	LVS	PHO	CAL	TEX	BRI	RCH	TAL	DOV	CLT	POC	MCH	IOW	CHI	DAY	KEN	NHA	IOW	GLN	MOH	BRI	ROA	DAR	IND	LVS	RCH	CLT	DOV	KAN	TEX	PHO	HOM			102nd	0^{1}	

==== Gander Outdoors Truck Series ====
NASCAR Gander Outdoors Truck Series results
Year	Team	No.	Make	1	2	3	4	5	6	7	8	9	10	11	12	13	14	15	16	17	18	19	20	21	22	23	24	25	NGOTC	Pts	Ref
2010	Rick Ware Racing	6	Chevy	DAY	ATL	MAR; 17	NSH	KAN	DOV	CLT	TEX	MCH	IOW	GTY	IRP	POC	NSH	DAR	BRI	CHI	KEN	NHA	LVS	MAR	TAL	TEX	PHO	HOM	93rd	112	
2013	Rick Ware Racing	1	Chevy	DAY	MAR	CAR	KAN	CLT	DOV	TEX	KEN	IOW	ELD	POC	MCH	BRI	MSP	IOW	CHI	LVS	TAL	MAR	TEX	PHO; 35					61st	26	
2013	Rick Ware Racing	84	Chevy																						HOM; 26				61st	26	
2016	Premium Motorsports	49	Chevy	DAY	ATL	MAR	KAN	DOV	CLT	TEX	IOW	GTW	KEN	ELD	POC	BRI	MCH	MSP; 14	CHI	NHA	LVS	TAL	MAR; 23	TEX	PHO	HOM			93rd	0^{1}	
2017	Gaunt Brothers Racing	96	Toyota	DAY	ATL	MAR	KAN	CLT	DOV	TEX	GTW	IOW	KEN	ELD	POC	MCH	BRI	MSP; 14	CHI	NHA	LVS								88th	0^{1}	
2017	Premium Motorsports	15	Chevy																			TAL; 15	MAR	TEX	PHO	HOM			88th	0^{1}	
2018	Premium Motorsports	49	Chevy	DAY	ATL	LVS	MAR	DOV	KAN	CLT	TEX	IOW	GTW	CHI	KEN	ELD	POC	MCH	BRI	MSP; 12	LVS	TAL	MAR; 25	TEX	PHO; 21	HOM; 26			40th	65	
2019	Young's Motorsports	02	Chevy	DAY	ATL	LVS	MAR	TEX	DOV	KAN	CLT	TEX	IOW	GTW	CHI	KEN	POC	ELD	MCH	BRI	MSP; 15	LVS	TAL	MAR	PHO	HOM			72nd	23	

==== Busch North Series ====
NASCAR Busch North Series results
Year	Team	No.	Make	1	2	3	4	5	6	7	8	9	10	11	12	13	14	15	16	17	18	19	20	NBNSC	Pts	Ref
1999	Info not available			LEE	RPS; DNQ	NHA	TMP	NZH	HOL	BEE	JEN	GLN	STA	NHA	NZH	STA	NHA	GLN	EPP	THU	BEE	NHA	LRP	N/A	-	

==== K&N Pro Series West ====
NASCAR K&N Pro Series West results
Year	Team	No.	Make	1	2	3	4	5	6	7	8	9	10	11	12	13	14	15	NKNPSWC	Pts	Ref
2011	Bill McAnally Racing	12	Toyota	PHO; 10	AAS	MMP	IOW	LVS	SON	IRW	EVG	PIR	CNS	MRP	SPO	AAS			48th	264	
2011	Bill McAnally Racing	81	Toyota														PHO; 11		48th	264	
2012	Bill McAnally Racing	81	Toyota	PHO; 10	LHC	MMP	S99	IOW	BIR	LVS	SON	EVG	CNS	IOW	PIR	SMP	AAS	PHO	62nd	34	
2013	Bill McAnally Racing	81	Toyota	PHO; 7	S99	BIR	IOW	L44	SON	CNS	IOW	EVG	SPO	MMP	SMP	AAS	KCR		44th	55	
2013	Dwight Kennedy	81	Dodge															PHO; 26	44th	55	
2014	Dwight Kennedy	81	Dodge	PHO; 5	IRW	S99	IOW	KCR	SON	SLS	CNS	IOW	EVG	KCR	MMP	AAS	PHO; 7		31st	76	
2015	Dwight Kennedy	81	Toyota	KCR	IRW	TUS	IOW	SHA	SON	SLS	IOW	EVG	CNS	MER	AAS	PHO; 9			49th	35	

==== Whelen Modified Tour ====
NASCAR Whelen Modified Tour results
Year	Car owner	No.	Make	1	2	3	4	5	6	7	8	9	10	11	12	13	14	15	16	NWMTC	Pts	Ref
2011	Ron Sheridan	17	Dodge	TMP	STA	STA	MND	TMP	NHA	RIV	STA	NHA	BRI	DEL; 8	TMP	LRP	NHA	STA	TMP	42nd	142	

==== Canada Series ====
NASCAR Canada Series results
Year	Team	No.	Make	1	2	3	4	5	6	7	8	9	10	11	12	13	14	NCSC	Pts	Ref
2007	DJK Racing	17	Dodge	**HAM**; 25	MSP; 5	BAR; 1*	MPS; 5	EDM; 4	CGV; 4	MSP; 10	CTR; 12	HAM; 3	BAR; 1	RIS; 3	KWA; 25			2nd	1793	
2008	DJK Racing	17	Dodge	HAM; 22	MSP; 2	BAR; 3	ASE; 2	MPS; 5	EDM; 5	CGV; 4	MSP; 3	CTR; 4	HAM; 10	BAR; 7	RIS; 21	KWA; 2		3rd	1972	
2009	DJK Racing	17	Dodge	ASE; 16	DEL; 1*	MSP; 4	**ASE**; 2	MPS; 4	EDM; 16	SAS; 3	MSP; 3*	CTR; 3	CGV; 4	BAR; 10	**RIS**; 18	KWA; 1		2nd	2023	
2010	DJK Racing	17	Dodge	**DEL**; 1*	MSP; 6	ASE; 1	TOR; 3	EDM; 15	**MPS**; 2*	**SAS**; 1*	CTR; 4	**MSP**; 6	CGV; 28	BAR; 1	RIS; 1*	**KWA**; 3		1st	2117	
2011	DJK Racing	17	Dodge	MSP; 5	ICAR; 20	DEL; 3	MSP; 1	TOR; 5	MPS; 2*	**SAS**; 2*	CTR; 9	CGV; 18	BAR; 7	RIS; 4	KWA; 1*			2nd	1881	
2012	DJK Racing	17	Dodge	MSP; 2	ICAR; 5	MSP; 1*	**DEL**; 1*	MPS; 1*	EDM; 1	SAS; 1	CTR; 5	CGV; 5	BAR; 21	RIS; 1*	KWA; 1			1st	517	
2013	DJK Racing	17	Dodge	MSP; 4	DEL; 4	MSP; 10	ICAR; 6	MPS; 9	SAS; 4	ASE; 16	CTR; 1	RIS; 2	MSP; 4	BAR; 2	KWA; 4			2nd	471	
2014	DJK Racing	17	Dodge	MSP; 5	ACD; 7	ICAR; 12	EIR; 5	SAS; 8	ASE; 9	CTR; 18	RIS; 3	MSP; 7	BAR; 3	KWA; 5				3rd	402	
2015	DJK Racing	17	Dodge	MSP; 4	ACD; 3	SSS; 16	ICAR; 9	EIR; 4	SAS; 16	ASE; 5	CTR; 7	**RIS**; 16	MSP; 4	KWA; 3				7th	382	
2016	DJK Racing	17	Dodge	MSP; 3	SSS; 6	ACD; 10	ICAR; 4	TOR; 25	EIR; 10	SAS; 6	CTR; 9	RIS; 8	MSP; 8	ASE; 2*	KWA; 4			6th	438	
2017	DJK Racing	17	Dodge	MSP; 17	DEL; 3	ACD; 4	ICAR; 8	TOR; 6	SAS; 2	**SAS**; 2*	EIR; 6	CTR; 8	**RIS**; 3	MSP; 9	ASE; 7	**JUK**; 17		5th	486	
2018	DJK Racing	17	Dodge	MSP; 4	JUK; 6	ACD; 5	TOR; 8	SAS; 5	SAS; 5	EIR; 5	CTR; 6	RIS; 3	MSP; 6	ASE; 7	NHA; 5	**JUK**; 1*		3rd	511	
2019	DJK Racing	17	Dodge	MSP; 8	JUK; 8	CHA; 12	TOR; 9	WYA; 16	WYA; 2	EDM; 10	TRO; 5	RIV; 2	MOS; 7	STE; 6	NHA; 3	JUK; 8		5th	480	
2020	DJK Racing	17	Dodge	SUN; 4	SUN; 6	FLA; 5	FLA; 4	JUK; 4	JUK; 1*									3rd	247	
2021	DJK Racing	17	Dodge	SUN; 17	SUN; 2	CTR; 6	ICAR; 6	MSP; 6	MSP; 24	FLA; 2	DEL; 1	DEL; 1	DEL; 5					3rd	378	
2022	DJK Racing	17	Dodge	SUN; 11	MSP; 11	ACD; 3	AVE; 3	TOR; 11	EDM; 7	SAS; 1	SAS; 6	CTR; 2	OSK; 6	ICAR; 12	MSP; 7	DEL; 5		3rd	494	
2023	DJK Racing	17	Dodge	SUN; 6	MSP; 8	ACD; 6	AVE; 19	TOR; 9	EIR; 17	SAS; 10	SAS; 12	CTR; 5	OSK; 3	OSK; 5	ICAR; 10	MSP; 4	DEL; 3	6th	500	
2024	DJK Racing	17	Dodge	MSP; 6	ACD; 6	AVE; 7	RIS; 14	RIS; 5	OSK; 11	SAS; 6	EIR; 5	CTR; 5	ICAR; 11	MSP; 5	DEL; 3	AMS; 9		4th	479	
2025	DJK Racing	17	Dodge	MSP; 7	**RIS**; 1*	EDM; 5	SAS; 6	CMP; 8	ACD; 4	CTR; 7	ICAR; 8	MSP; 6	**DEL**; 2*	DEL; 2	AMS; 5			2nd	476	
2026	DJK Racing	17	Dodge	MSP; 9	ACD; 6	ACD; 15	RIS; 10	AMS; 10	AMS; 3	CMP; 8	EIR; 7	EIR; 6	CTR; 29	MAR; 7	ICAR; 10	MSP; 24		4th	474	
2026	Rick Ware Racing	51	Dodge														DEL; 3	4th	474	

^{*} Season still in progress
^{1} Ineligible for series points

Sporting positions
Preceded by Andrew Ranger	NASCAR Canadian Tire Series Champion; 2010	Succeeded by Scott Steckly
Preceded by Scott Steckly	NASCAR Canadian Tire Series Champion; 2012	Succeeded by Scott Steckly
