= Steven Mathews =

Canadian racing driver

- Born: August 27, 1990 (age 36); New Liskeard, Ontario, Canada

ARCA Menards Series career
- 3 races run over 1 year
- Best finish: 42nd (2013)
- First race: 2013 Prairie Meadows 150 (Iowa)
- Last race: 2013 Kansas Lottery 98.9 (Kansas)
Wins	Top tens	Poles
0	1	0
- Statistics up to date as of February 10, 2025.

Steven Mathews (born August 27, 1990) is a Canadian professional stock car racing driver who has previously competed in the ARCA Racing Series and the NASCAR Canada Series.

Mathews has also competed in series such as the USAC Western States Midget Series, the USAC Indiana Ford Focus Midget Car Series, the NASCAR Advance Auto Parts Weekly Series, and the ASA Late Model Series.

== Motorsports results ==
=== ARCA Racing Series ===
(key) (Bold – Pole position awarded by qualifying time. Italics – Pole position earned by points standings or practice time. * – Most laps led.)

ARCA Racing Series results
Year	Team	No.	Make	1	2	3	4	5	6	7	8	9	10	11	12	13	14	15	16	17	18	19	20	21	ARSC	Pts	Ref
2013	Roulo Brothers Racing	99	Ford	DAY	MOB	SLM	TAL	TOL	ELK	POC	MCH	ROA	WIN	CHI	NJM	POC	BLN	ISF	MAD	DSF	IOW; 31	SLM	KEN; 20	KAN; 8	42nd	645	
