= Don Thomson Jr. =

Canadian racing driver (born 1962)

- Born: August 24, 1962; Ayr, Ontario, Canada
- Achievements: 2001, 2002, 2003, 2004, 2005 CASCAR Super Series Champion

NASCAR O'Reilly Auto Parts Series career
- 1 race run over 1 year
- Best finish: 144th (2008)
- First race: 2008 NAPA Auto Parts 200 (Montreal)
Wins	Top tens	Poles
0	0	0

NASCAR Canada Series career
- 134 races run over 11 years
- 2011 position: 5th
- Best finish: 1st (2001, 2002, 2003, 2004, 2005)
- First race: 2001 Mopar 250 (Delaware)
- Last race: 2011 Kawartha 250 (Kawartha)
- First win: 2001 Budweiser 150 (Kawartha)
- Last win: 2011 Keystone Light 200 (Delaware)
Wins	Top tens	Poles
14	105	30
- Statistics up to date as of July 11, 2012.

Don Thomson Jr. (born August 24, 1962) is a Canadian former racing driver in the NASCAR Canada Series. He drove the No. 4 Home Hardware Chevrolet Monte Carlo SS for Fitzpatrick Motorsports for more than two decades before moving over in 2011 to drive the No. 8 Dodge, becoming teammates with Jason Hathaway. He retired after the 2011 season after winning multiple championships.

== Racing career ==
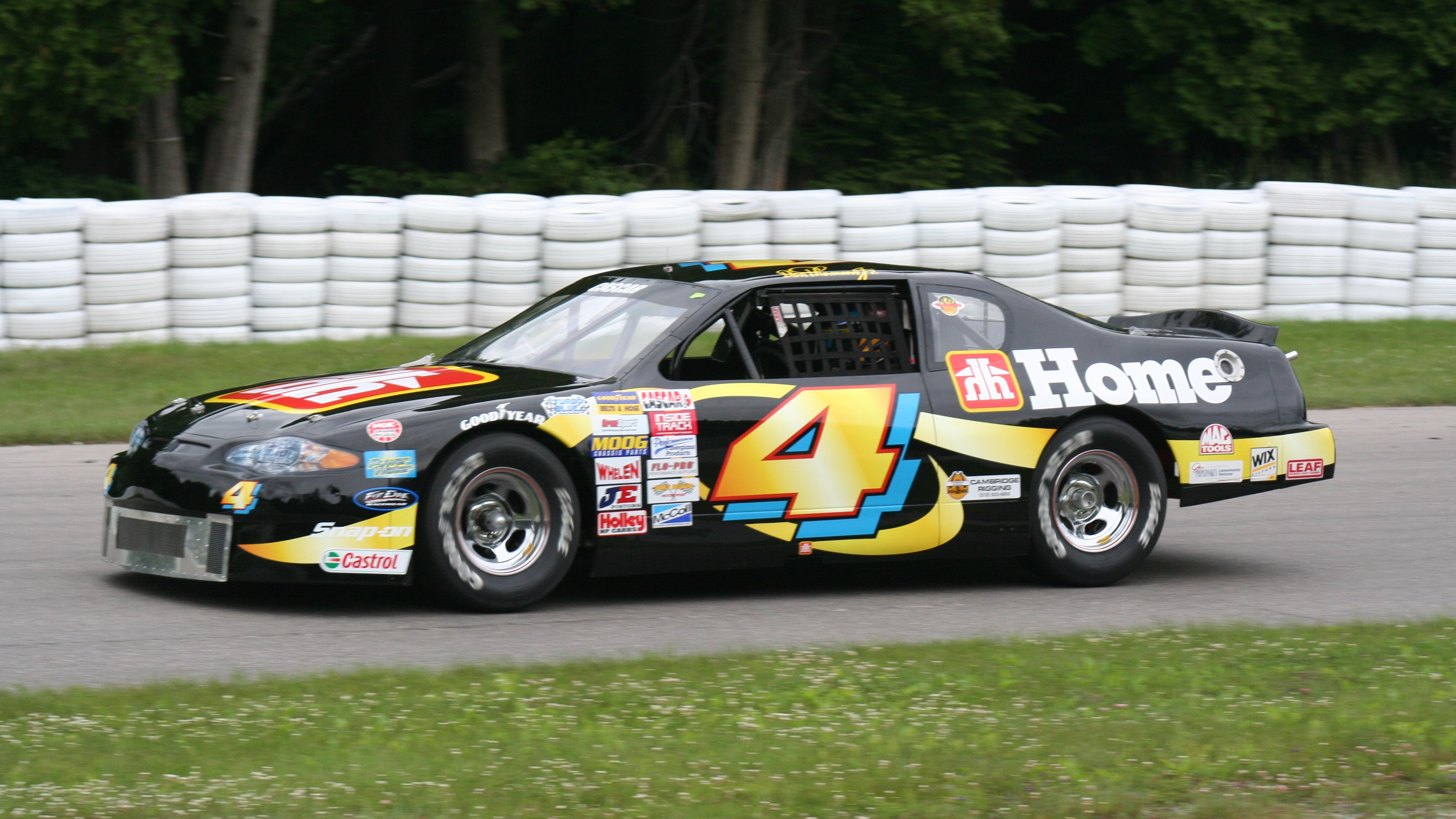
Don Thomson Jr. - CASCAR Super Series 2005

Thomson was the 2001 to 2005 champion in the CASCAR Super Series, the premiere stockcar series in Canada picking up many wins. He moved to the NASCAR Canadian Tire Series when CASCAR was purchased by NASCAR in 2007.

Thomson won the first race in the NASCAR Canadian Tire Series history at Cayuga International Speedway on May 26, 2007 as well as Mosport Speedway (2007); Sun Valley (2008), Riverside (2008). He has nine poles which include Sun Valley (2007), Cayuga-2 (2007); Cayuga-1 (2008), Barrie-1 (2008), Saint-Eustache (2008), Sun Valley (2008), Cayuga-2 (2008), Barrie-2 (2008) and Kawartha (2008). He also finished second in points in 2008, finishing 24 points behind Scott Steckly.

In 2009, he picked up one win at Barrie Speedway while in 2010, his performance improved getting one win at Mosport International Raceway.

== Motorsports career results ==
=== NASCAR ===
(key) (Bold – Pole position awarded by qualifying time. Italics – Pole position earned by points standings or practice time. * – Most laps led.)

==== Nationwide Series ====
NASCAR Nationwide Series results
Year	Team	No.	Make	1	2	3	4	5	6	7	8	9	10	11	12	13	14	15	16	17	18	19	20	21	22	23	24	25	26	27	28	29	30	31	32	33	34	35	NNSC	Pts	Ref
2008	MSRP Motorsports	90	Chevy	DAY	CAL	LVS	ATL	BRI	NSH	TEX	PHO	MXC	TAL	RCH	DAR	CLT	DOV	NSH	KEN	MLW	NHA	DAY	CHI	GTY	IRP	CGV; 40	GLN	MCH	BRI	CAL	RCH	DOV	KAN	CLT	MEM	TEX	PHO	HOM	144th	43	
