= Pacific Place =

Pacific Place may refer to:

- Pacific Place (Seattle), a shopping centre in Seattle, United States
- Pacific Place Jakarta, a shopping centre in Jakarta, Indonesia
- Pacific Place (Dallas), a skyscraper in Dallas, United States
- Pacific Place (Hong Kong), a complex of office towers, hotels and shopping centre in Hong Kong
- Concord Pacific Place, an urban redevelopment area in Vancouver, Canada
