= Scott Steckly =

Canadian racing driver (born 1972)

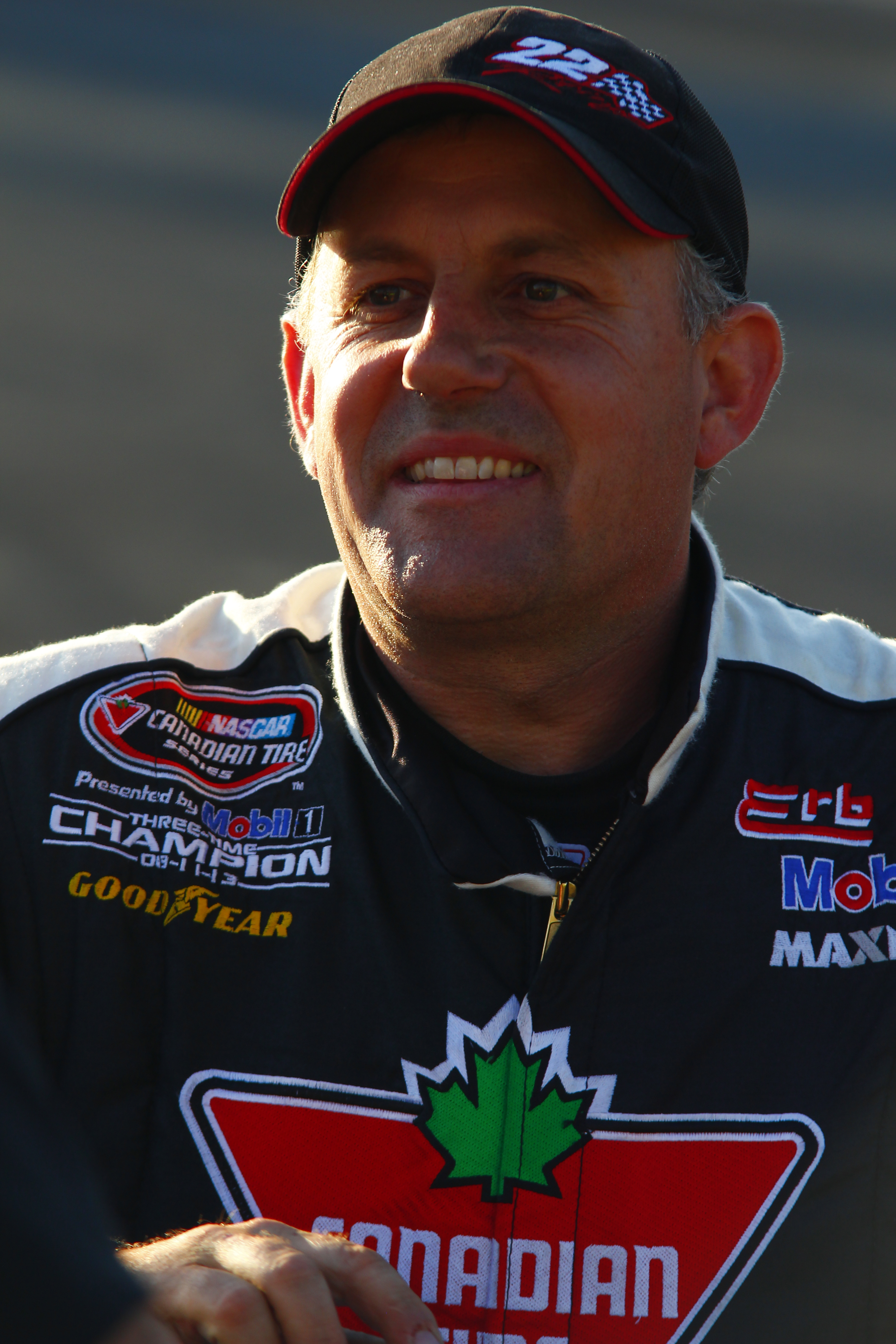
- Steckly in 2015
- Born: March 2, 1972 (age 54); Milverton, Ontario, Canada
- Achievements: 2008, 2011, 2013, 2015 NASCAR Canadian Tire Series Champion

NASCAR O'Reilly Auto Parts Series career
- 1 race run over 1 year
- Best finish: 147th (2008)
- First race: 2008 NAPA Auto Parts 200 (Montreal)
| Wins | Top tens | Poles |
|---|---|---|
| 0 | 0 | 0 |

NASCAR Canada Series career
- 110 races run over 10 years
- 2019 position: 38th
- Best finish: 1st (2008, 2011, 2013, 2015)
- First race: 2007 Dodge Dealers 200 (Cayuga)
- Last race: 2019 Lucas Oil 250 (St Eustache)
- First win: 2007 Dodge Charger 250 (Kawartha)
- Last win: 2015 Wounded Warriors Canada 300 (Antigonish)
| Wins | Top tens | Poles |
|---|---|---|
| 19 | 82 | 17 |
- Statistics up to date as of September 29, 2019.

Scott Steckly (born March 2, 1972) is a Canadian professional stock car racing driver and team owner. In his nine years competing in the NASCAR Canadian Tire Series, he drove the No. 22 Dodge Charger for his own 22 Racing team. He is the 2008, 2011, 2013, and 2015 NASCAR Canadian Tire Series Champion. He currently fields the No. 18 Chevrolet Camaro full-time for Alex Tagliani, the No. 22 Camaro full-time for Marc-Antoine Camirand, and the No. 24 Camaro full-time for Donald Theetge. He is the father of fellow racing driver Kyle Steckly.

== Racing career ==
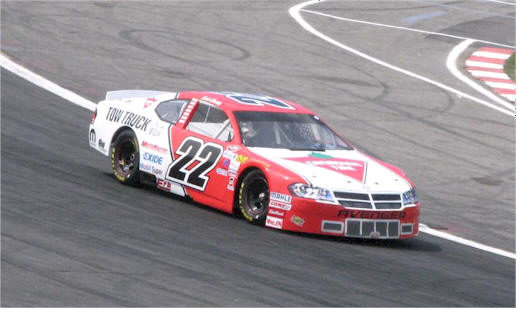
Steckly's car in 2009

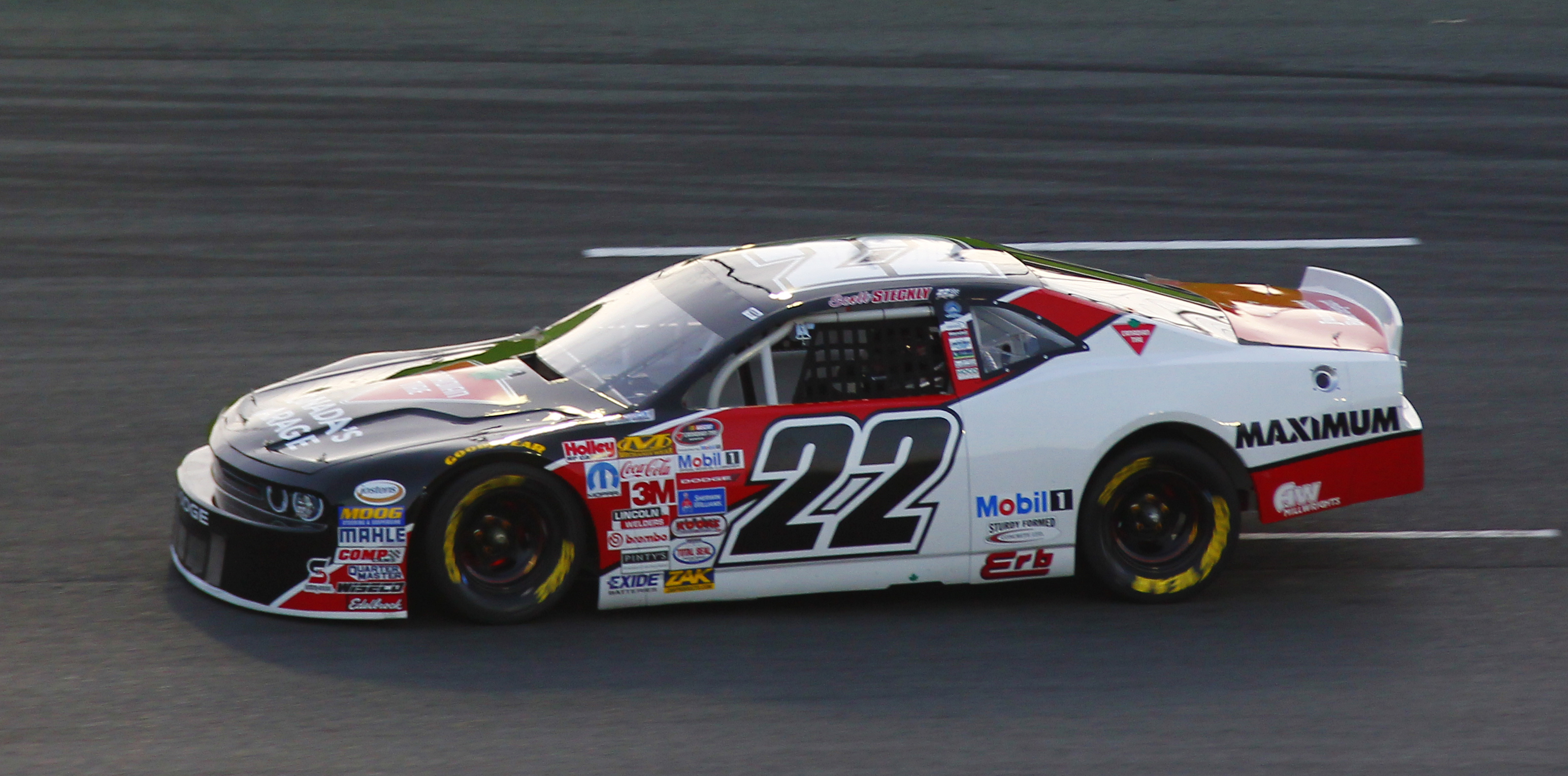
Steckly's No. 22 car at Autodrome Chaudière in 2015

Steckly made his debut in CASCAR Super Series in 2000 season, driving the No. 22 for his own team. Steckly ran in CASCAR Super Series from 2000 to 2006 season when NASCAR purchased CASCAR and created the NASCAR Canadian Tire Series in 2007 season. Steckly had one win, 19 top-fives and 37 top-tens in 71 races. His best championship result was in 2006 when Steckly finished sixth.

Since the formation of the Canadian Tire Series, Steckly has won seven times, four times in 2008 (Cayuga, Barrie, St. Eustache and Barrie 2) and once in the final race of 2007 (Kawartha) on his way to becoming the 2008 Series Champion. His championship made him eligible to compete in the 2008 Toyota All-Star Showdown, but he was taken out in a wreck early and finished 38th of 40 cars in the event. Steckly also made his Nationwide Series debut during 2008 in the NAPA Auto Parts 200 at Circuit Gilles Villeneuve, start-and-parking for MSRP Motorsports.

Steckly started off the 2009 season solid getting a win in the third race at St. Eustache Tide 250 leading 39 of the final 40 laps as well as the first ever race at Auto Clearing Motor Speedway. Steckly's car overturned at Montreal after being hit by another car at turn three. It flipped once fully, then rolled to its roof, coming to a stop upside-down, back end high in the air. He was unhurt.

In 2010, Steckly picked up the win at Motoplex Speedway after a late race pass on D. J. Kennington and finished third in points. He started off the 2011 year with a dominating performance with his Erb Racing team winning the first event at Mosport International Raceway.

In 2011, Steckly won the season opening event at Mosport and the rounds at Motoplex and Riverside on his way to win his second series championship; after finishing fourth in 2012, he returned to win four races on his way to winning the 2013 season championship by two points over D. J. Kennington. He ran his last full-time season in 2015.

During the 2019 season, 22 Racing driver Alex Tagliani was forced to miss the Autodrome St. Eustache round due to myocarditis. In his place, Steckly ran his first race in four years. After qualifying tenth, he finished 11th.

== Motorsports career results ==
=== NASCAR ===
(key) (Bold – Pole position awarded by qualifying time. Italics – Pole position earned by points standings or practice time. * – Most laps led.)

==== Nationwide Series ====
NASCAR Nationwide Series results
| Year | Team | No. | Make | 1 | 2 | 3 | 4 | 5 | 6 | 7 | 8 | 9 | 10 | 11 | 12 | 13 | 14 | 15 | 16 | 17 | 18 | 19 | 20 | 21 | 22 | 23 | 24 | 25 | 26 | 27 | 28 | 29 | 30 | 31 | 32 | 33 | 34 | 35 | NNSC | Pts | Ref |
|---|---|---|---|---|---|---|---|---|---|---|---|---|---|---|---|---|---|---|---|---|---|---|---|---|---|---|---|---|---|---|---|---|---|---|---|---|---|---|---|---|---|
| 2008 | MSRP Motorsports | 91 | Chevy | DAY | CAL | LVS | ATL | BRI | NSH | TEX | PHO | MXC | TAL | RCH | DAR | CLT | DOV | NSH | KEN | MLW | NHA | DAY | CHI | GTY | IRP | CGV; 41 | GLN | MCH | BRI | CAL | RCH | DOV | KAN | CLT | MEM | TEX | PHO | HOM | 147th | 40 | |

==== Pinty's Series ====
NASCAR Pinty's Series results
| Year | Team | No. | Make | 1 | 2 | 3 | 4 | 5 | 6 | 7 | 8 | 9 | 10 | 11 | 12 | 13 | NPSC | Pts | Ref |
|---|---|---|---|---|---|---|---|---|---|---|---|---|---|---|---|---|---|---|---|
| 2007 | 22 Racing | 22 | Dodge | HAM; 12 | MSP; 20 | BAR; 19 | MPS; 2* | EDM; 27 | CGV; 5 | MSP; 7 | CTR; 8 | HAM; 16 | BAR; 10 | RIS; 6 | KWA; 1 | | 10th | 1630 | |
| 2008 | 22 Racing | 22 | Dodge | HAM; 1* | **MSP**; 4 | BAR; 1* | ASE; 1 | MPS; 2 | EDM; 2 | CGV; 2 | **MSP**; 21* | CTR; 2 | HAM; 18 | BAR; 1 | RIS; 13 | KWA; 17 | 1st | 2070 | |
| 2009 | 22 Racing | 22 | Dodge | **ASE**; 4 | DEL; 3 | MSP; 20 | ASE; 1* | MPS; 2 | EDM; 3 | SAS; 1 | MSP; 2 | CTR; 27 | CGV; 19 | BAR; 3 | RIS; 17 | KWA; 4 | 4th | 1953 | |
| 2010 | 22 Racing | 22 | Dodge | DEL; 16 | MSP; 4 | ASE; 2* | TOR; 11 | EDM; 3 | MPS; 1 | SAS; 4 | CTR; 6 | MSP; 17 | CGV; 4 | BAR; 4* | **RIS**; 2 | KWA; 6 | 3rd | 2022 | |
| 2011 | 22 Racing | 22 | Dodge | MSP; 1* | ICAR; 2 | DEL; 2 | **MSP**; 5 | TOR; 2 | **MPS**; 1 | SAS; 20 | CTR; 3 | CGV; 7 | **BAR**; 14* | **RIS**; 1* | KWA; 2 | | 1st | 1960 | |
| 2012 | 22 Racing | 22 | Dodge | **MSP**; 3 | **ICAR**; 3 | MSP; 14 | DEL; 2 | MPS; 3 | **EDM**; 4* | SAS; 4 | CTR; 7 | CGV; 4 | BAR; 9 | RIS; 4 | KWA; 6 | | 4th | 471 | |
| 2013 | 22 Racing | 22 | Dodge | MSP; 24 | **DEL**; 21 | MSP; 2 | ICAR; 2 | MPS; 1* | SAS; 1 | ASE; 1 | CTR; 8 | **RIS**; 3* | MSP; 11 | **BAR**; 4 | **KWA**; 1* | | 1st | 473 | |
| 2014 | 22 Racing | 22 | Dodge | MSP; 25 | ACD; 4 | ICAR; 7 | EIR; 8 | **SAS**; 3* | ASE; 1* | CTR; 16 | RIS; 15 | MSP; 5 | BAR; 13 | KWA; 2 | | | 4th | 394 | |
| 2015 | 22 Racing | 22 | Dodge | MSP; 5 | ACD; 16* | SSS; 4 | ICAR; 5 | **EIR**; 1* | **SAS**; 1* | **ASE**; 10* | CTR; 9 | RIS; 1* | MSP; 7 | **KWA**; 2 | | | 1st | 446 | |
| 2019 | 22 Racing | 18 | Chevy | MSP | HAM | ACD | TOR | SAS | SAS | EIR | CTR | RIS | MSP | ASE; 11 | NHA | JUK | 38th | 33 | |

^{*} Season still in progress
^{1} Ineligible for series points

Achievements
| Preceded by Andrew Ranger; D. J. Kennington; D. J. Kennington; Louis-Philippe Dumoulin | NASCAR Canadian Tire Series Champion; 2008; 2011; 2013; 2015 | Succeeded by Andrew Ranger; D. J. Kennington; Louis-Philippe Dumoulin; Cayden Lapcevich |
