= 2017 Coke Zero 400 =

Auto race held at Daytona in 2017

Race details
- Race 17 of 36 in the 2017 Monster Energy NASCAR Cup Series
- The 2017 Coke Zero 400 program cover, featuring a tribute to Dale Earnhardt Jr. "A Daytona Legend"
- Date: July 1, 2017
- Location: Daytona International Speedway in Daytona Beach, Florida
- Course: Permanent racing facility
- Course length: 2.5 miles (4.023 km)
- Distance: 163 laps, 407.5 mi (655.808 km)
- Scheduled distance: 160 laps, 400 mi (643.738 km)
- Average speed: 123.986 miles per hour (199.536 km/h)

Pole position
Driver	Dale Earnhardt Jr.	Hendrick Motorsports
- Time: 47.127

Most laps led
Driver	Brad Keselowski	Team Penske
- Laps: 35

Winner
No. 17	Ricky Stenhouse Jr.	Roush Fenway Racing

Television in the United States
- Network: NBC
- Announcers: Rick Allen, Jeff Burton and Steve Letarte

Radio in the United States
- Radio: MRN
- Booth announcers: Joe Moore, Jeff Striegle and Rusty Wallace
- Turn announcers: Dave Moody (1 & 2), Mike Bagley (Backstretch) and Kyle Rickey (3 & 4)

The 2017 Coke Zero 400 powered by Coca-Cola was a Monster Energy NASCAR Cup Series race held on July 1, 2017 at Daytona International Speedway in Daytona Beach, Florida. Contested over 163 laps, extended from 160 laps due to overtime, on the 2.5-mile (4.0-kilometre) superspeedway, it was the 17th race of the 2017 Monster Energy NASCAR Cup Series season.

Ricky Stenhouse Jr. of Roush Fenway Racing took his second victory of the season, having taken the lead from Front Row Motorsports driver David Ragan on the final restart.

== Entry list ==
No.	Driver	Team	Manufacturer
1	Jamie McMurray	Chip Ganassi Racing	Chevrolet
2	Brad Keselowski	Team Penske	Ford
3	Austin Dillon	Richard Childress Racing	Chevrolet
4	Kevin Harvick	Stewart–Haas Racing	Ford
5	Kasey Kahne	Hendrick Motorsports	Chevrolet
6	Trevor Bayne	Roush Fenway Racing	Ford
7	Elliott Sadler (i)	Tommy Baldwin Racing	Chevrolet
10	Danica Patrick	Stewart–Haas Racing	Ford
11	Denny Hamlin	Joe Gibbs Racing	Toyota
13	Ty Dillon (R)	Germain Racing	Chevrolet
14	Clint Bowyer	Stewart–Haas Racing	Ford
15	D. J. Kennington	Premium Motorsports	Toyota
17	Ricky Stenhouse Jr.	Roush Fenway Racing	Ford
18	Kyle Busch	Joe Gibbs Racing	Toyota
19	Daniel Suárez (R)	Joe Gibbs Racing	Toyota
20	Matt Kenseth	Joe Gibbs Racing	Toyota
21	Ryan Blaney	Wood Brothers Racing	Ford
22	Joey Logano	Team Penske	Ford
23	Corey LaJoie (R)	BK Racing	Toyota
24	Chase Elliott	Hendrick Motorsports	Chevrolet
27	Paul Menard	Richard Childress Racing	Chevrolet
31	Ryan Newman	Richard Childress Racing	Chevrolet
32	Matt DiBenedetto	Go Fas Racing	Ford
33	Jeffrey Earnhardt	Circle Sport – The Motorsports Group	Chevrolet
34	Landon Cassill	Front Row Motorsports	Ford
37	Chris Buescher	JTG Daugherty Racing	Chevrolet
38	David Ragan	Front Row Motorsports	Ford
41	Kurt Busch	Stewart–Haas Racing	Ford
42	Kyle Larson	Chip Ganassi Racing	Chevrolet
43	Bubba Wallace (i)	Richard Petty Motorsports	Ford
47	A. J. Allmendinger	JTG Daugherty Racing	Chevrolet
48	Jimmie Johnson	Hendrick Motorsports	Chevrolet
55	Reed Sorenson	Premium Motorsports	Toyota
72	Cole Whitt	TriStar Motorsports	Chevrolet
75	Brendan Gaughan (i)	Beard Motorsports	Chevrolet
77	Erik Jones (R)	Furniture Row Racing	Toyota
78	Martin Truex Jr.	Furniture Row Racing	Toyota
83	Ryan Sieg (i)	BK Racing	Toyota
88	Dale Earnhardt Jr.	Hendrick Motorsports	Chevrolet
95	Michael McDowell	Leavine Family Racing	Chevrolet
Official entry list

== Practice ==
=== First practice ===
Kyle Busch was the fastest in the first practice session with a time of 45.584 seconds and a speed of 197.438 mph (317.746 km/h).

Pos	No.	Driver	Team	Manufacturer	Time	Speed
1	18	Kyle Busch	Joe Gibbs Racing	Toyota	45.584	197.438
2	2	Brad Keselowski	Team Penske	Ford	45.632	197.230
3	4	Kevin Harvick	Stewart–Haas Racing	Ford	45.639	197.200
Official first practice results

=== Final practice ===
Dale Earnhardt Jr. was the fastest in the final practice session with a time of 46.553 seconds and a speed of 193.328 mph (311.131 km/h).

Pos	No.	Driver	Team	Manufacturer	Time	Speed
1	88	Dale Earnhardt Jr.	Hendrick Motorsports	Chevrolet	46.553	193.328
2	95	Michael McDowell	Leavine Family Racing	Chevrolet	46.572	193.249
3	48	Jimmie Johnson	Hendrick Motorsports	Chevrolet	46.577	193.228
Official final practice results

== Qualifying ==
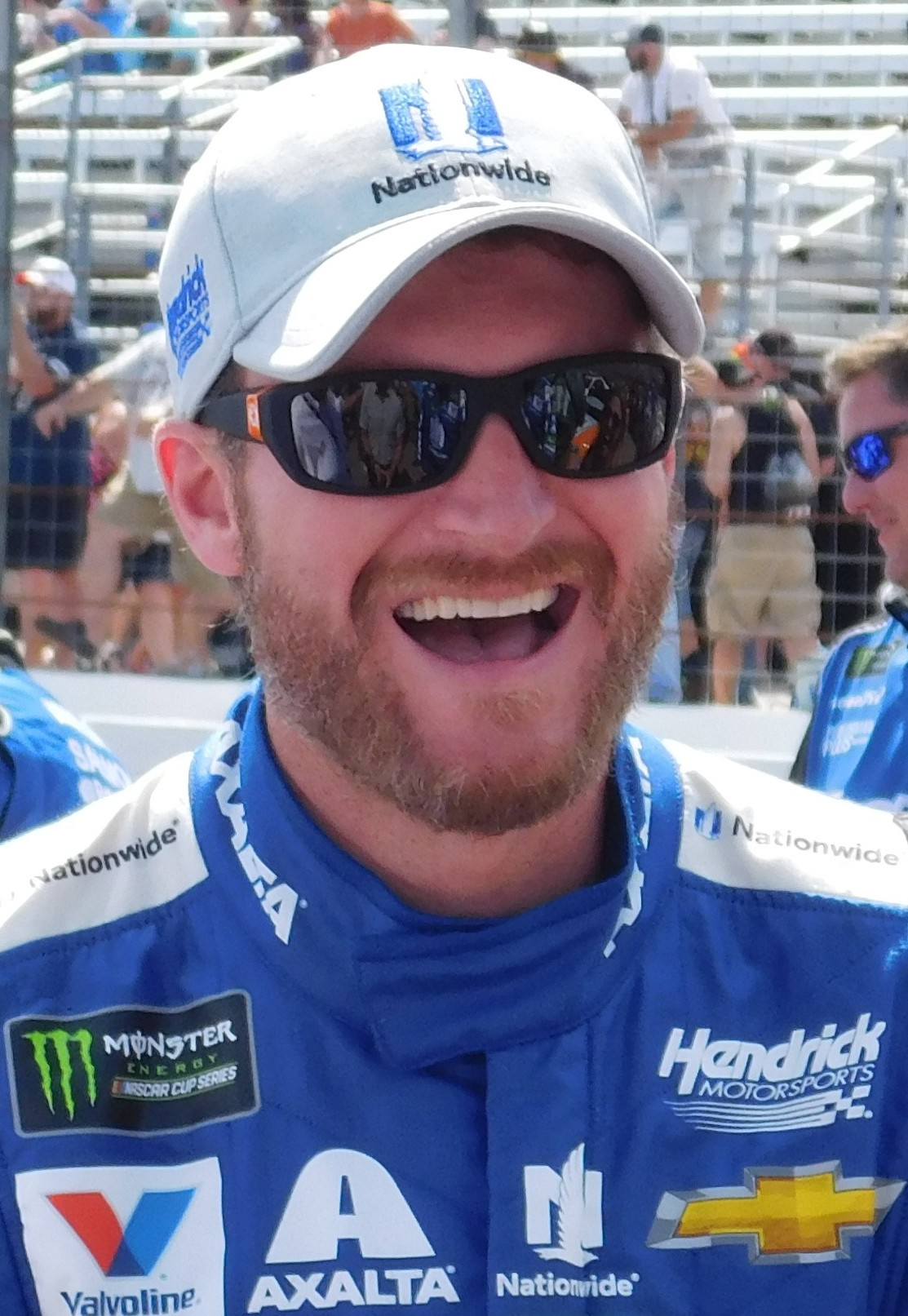
Dale Earnhardt Jr. scored the pole position.

Dale Earnhardt Jr. scored the pole for the race with a time of 47.127 and a speed of 190.973 mph (307.341 km/h).

=== Qualifying results ===
Pos	No.	Driver	Team	Manufacturer	R1	R2
1	88	Dale Earnhardt Jr.	Hendrick Motorsports	Chevrolet	47.157	47.127
2	24	Chase Elliott	Hendrick Motorsports	Chevrolet	47.182	47.171
3	2	Brad Keselowski	Team Penske	Ford	47.365	47.297
4	5	Kasey Kahne	Hendrick Motorsports	Chevrolet	47.325	47.356
5	4	Kevin Harvick	Stewart–Haas Racing	Ford	47.467	47.357
6	17	Ricky Stenhouse Jr.	Roush Fenway Racing	Ford	47.322	47.367
7	22	Joey Logano	Team Penske	Ford	47.298	47.388
8	1	Jamie McMurray	Chip Ganassi Racing	Chevrolet	47.509	47.406
9	21	Ryan Blaney	Wood Brothers Racing	Ford	47.427	47.422
10	10	Danica Patrick	Stewart–Haas Racing	Ford	47.445	47.460
11	14	Clint Bowyer	Stewart–Haas Racing	Ford	47.489	47.486
12	48	Jimmie Johnson	Hendrick Motorsports	Chevrolet	47.538	47.506
13	20	Matt Kenseth	Joe Gibbs Racing	Toyota	47.543	—
14	6	Trevor Bayne	Roush Fenway Racing	Ford	47.563	—
15	41	Kurt Busch	Stewart–Haas Racing	Ford	47.569	—
16	18	Kyle Busch	Joe Gibbs Racing	Toyota	47.604	—
17	77	Erik Jones (R)	Furniture Row Racing	Toyota	47.624	—
18	11	Denny Hamlin	Joe Gibbs Racing	Toyota	47.648	—
19	3	Austin Dillon	Richard Childress Racing	Chevrolet	47.659	—
20	19	Daniel Suárez (R)	Joe Gibbs Racing	Toyota	47.730	—
21	42	Kyle Larson	Chip Ganassi Racing	Chevrolet	47.742	—
22	31	Ryan Newman	Richard Childress Racing	Chevrolet	47.756	—
23	95	Michael McDowell	Leavine Family Racing	Chevrolet	47.766	—
24	27	Paul Menard	Richard Childress Racing	Chevrolet	47.803	—
25	78	Martin Truex Jr.	Furniture Row Racing	Toyota	47.815	—
26	34	Landon Cassill	Front Row Motorsports	Ford	47.817	—
27	47	A. J. Allmendinger	JTG Daugherty Racing	Chevrolet	47.934	—
28	32	Matt DiBenedetto	Go Fas Racing	Ford	47.957	—
29	37	Chris Buescher	JTG Daugherty Racing	Chevrolet	47.969	—
30	38	David Ragan	Front Row Motorsports	Ford	48.041	—
31	43	Bubba Wallace (i)	Richard Petty Motorsports	Ford	48.145	—
32	75	Brendan Gaughan (i)	Beard Motorsports	Chevrolet	48.199	—
33	7	Elliott Sadler (i)	Tommy Baldwin Racing	Chevrolet	48.201	—
34	13	Ty Dillon (R)	Germain Racing	Chevrolet	48.346	—
35	72	Cole Whitt	TriStar Motorsports	Chevrolet	48.484	—
36	23	Corey LaJoie (R)	BK Racing	Toyota	48.529	—
37	55	Reed Sorenson	Premium Motorsports	Toyota	48.747	—
38	15	D. J. Kennington	Premium Motorsports	Toyota	48.790	—
39	83	Ryan Sieg (i)	BK Racing	Toyota	49.063	—
40	33	Jeffrey Earnhardt	Circle Sport – The Motorsports Group	Chevrolet	49.588	—
Official qualifying results

== Race ==
=== First stage ===
Dale Earnhardt Jr. led the field to the green flag at 7:58 p.m., but teammate Chase Elliott passed him in Turn 3 and led the first lap. After leading the first four, Elliott dropped to the bottom and allowed Brad Keselowski to pass him on the high-side going into Turn 1 to take the lead on the fifth lap. Ryan Sieg and Cole Whitt suffered engine failures on lap 10, bringing out the first caution of the race.

The race restarted on lap 13. Denny Hamlin made an unscheduled stop a lap later for a loose wheel, which was a result of having only one lug nut. Fortuitous for him, caution #2 flew two laps later when D. J. Kennington spun out moments after blowing his engine in Turn 4.

Back to green on lap 20, Kevin Harvick – heading up the bottom line of cars – caught up to and edged out Keselowski at the start/finish line to take the lead on lap 30. The next lap, Earnhardt charged up the extreme outside and inched out both Keselowski and Harvick to lead his first lap of the night. Keselowski reestablished his lead on lap 33, but Earnhardt and Harvick bypassed him on lap 34, with Harvick leading it. Keselowski regained the point on lap 35 and Earnhardt took over on lap 37. Finally, Keselowski gained the upper hand on lap 38 and won the first stage on lap 40, with caution #3 flying moments later for the conclusion of the stage. Erik Jones took over the lead when the others pitted, as he opted not to pit.

=== Second stage ===
A lap after resuming action on lap 47, Hamlin took over the lead. Exiting Turn 4 on lap 49, Michael McDowell and Daniel Suárez made contact and both wound up on the apron. But rather than blend back into the field and risk causing a wreck, both dove full speed down pit road – which NASCAR allows drivers to do to avoid a wreck/avoid causing a wreck – and rejoined the field at the tail-end. Earnhardt cut down a tire and hit the wall in Turn 1 on lap 51, a result of contact with Paul Menard. Caution flew for the fourth time when Jeffrey Earnhardt blew an engine on lap 59.

The race returned to green on lap 64. Matt Kenseth took the lead from teammate Hamlin on lap 69. Rounding Turn 2 on lap 71, Kyle Busch suffered a left-rear tire failure and spun out in front of most of the field, resulting in a 10-car wreck, which brought out the fifth caution. Austin Dillon, Joey Logano and Martin Truex Jr. took the heaviest damage in the melee. The failure was a result of Busch making contact the lap prior with McDowell heading into Turn 1. Logano's comments after he was released from the care center verified supported this, saying he saw McDowell get "into the side of (Busch). I didn't see any smoke off (Busch's car), just a near miss. Then four or five laps later I think, the left-rear popped on and around (Busch) started going and we were there."

Racing resumed on lap 76 and Kenseth drove on to win the second stage. Caution #6 flew moments later for the end of the stage. Harvick elected not to pit and usurped the lead under the caution.

=== Final stage ===
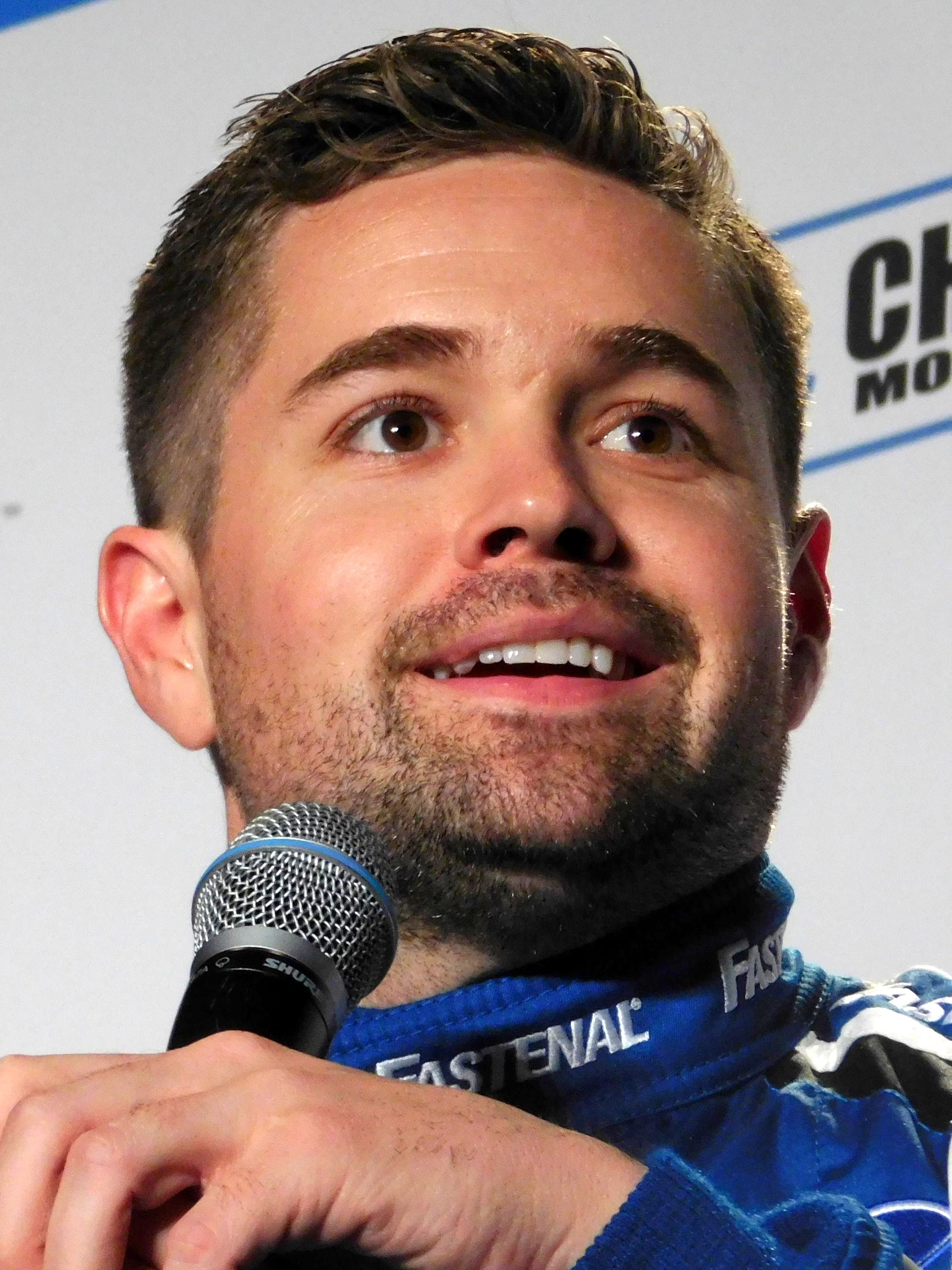
Ricky Stenhouse Jr. won the race.

On the lap 86 restart, Ricky Stenhouse Jr. passed Harvick heading down the backstretch to take the lead. Brendan Gaughan made contact with the wall in Turn 2 on lap 90, bringing out the seventh caution. Suárez took the lead when Stenhouse pitted.

Back to green on lap 96, Elliott and McDowell made contact exiting Turn 2 on lap 98, which sent Elliott spinning down the backstretch, collecting Trevor Bayne in the process. This brought out the eighth caution.

On the ensuing lap 102 restart, Kenseth took back the lead from teammate Suárez, only to lose it two laps later to Jimmie Johnson. Caution #9 flew a lap later when Harvick suffered a rear tire blowout and spun out in Turn 2, collecting Earnhardt and three others. Earnhardt said afterwards that he wished he "had had a good finish tonight if not a win. We were working up in there and having a good time and being aggressive and wearing out the sides of that race car. It just wasn't to be." Clint Bowyer took the lead when Johnson pitted.

Restart flew on lap 111. The next lap around, Stenhouse was back in front. Caution flew for the 10th time on lap 117 when Keselowski spun out in Turn 4. Stenhouse and Bowyer pitted, handing the lead back to Kenseth.

When the field reached the backstretch on the lap 121, Kasey Kahne was turned by David Ragan and spun down onto the apron, bringing out the 11th caution.

The race restarted on lap 125. Ryan Blaney made a crossover move on Kenseth on the backstretch to take the lead with 33 laps to go. Caution flew for the 12th time a lap later when Matt DiBenedetto when he suffered a right-front tire failure and slammed the wall.

The race resumed with 28 to go. Stenhouse worked his way back to the front with 25 to go, with Kahne taking over the following lap. From 22 to 20 to go, he and Suárez battled side-by-side for the lead, with Kahne taking sole control with 19 to go. With 11 to go, Stenhouse side-drafted him down the backstretch to retake the lead. Ty Dillon was credited as the leader with nine to go. Coming to the line with eight to go, Kyle Larson got turned into the tri-oval wall, lifting his car into the air for a few seconds. After his car landed back on the ground, it was t-boned by Blaney and made contact with Kenseth. This triggered a multi-car wreck that brought out the 13th caution, as well as an eight-minute and 41-second red flag.

Dillon lacked draft help on the ensuing restart with three to go, while Ragan got an excellent push to take the race lead. But a 2-car spin on the backstretch involving Jones and Hamlin sent the race into overtime and brought out the 14th caution.

==== Overtime ====
Heading down the backstretch in overtime with two to go, Ragan jumped to the high line and left the bottom open. Stenhouse pounced on the opening, took the lead going into Turn 3 and drove on to score the victory.

== Post-race ==
Stenhouse said in victory lane that his win validated "what we did at Talladega. We have been working hard at Roush Fenway and this pushes us further along. This Ford Performance team has been amazing. Ford has been dominant.”

Bowyer, who finished runner-up, said being bridesmaid "sucks. I want to win. We're in this business to win. That's what Tony (Stewart) and Gene (Haas) pay me to do." He also added that Stenhouse had "the fastest car right then. He did a good job getting it to the front, and she set sail. He does a good job of blocking. He's learned a lot. He's become a good [restrictor-]plate racer. I remember when he came in, he was a little bit chaotic, but he's not now. He's got it figured out, and he's won two of them."

McDowell, who finished a career-best fourth, on top of his six top-20 finishes in eight races, said it's awesome "to do this week after week. We've been putting together solid runs. At the same time, coming to the line second, I thought I had a shot at (Stenhouse) but just they had such a big run behind I couldn't hold them off.”

Ragan, who finished sixth after leading on the final restart, said he "made one bad move," and a few other "bad moves tonight," but that he was in a damned if he did and damned if he didn't scenario. "So if it was Thursday and you said ‘We'll give a sixth-place finish,’ I probably would have taken that coming down to Daytona because my record hasn't been that great the last several years here," he added. "I've been caught up in wrecks and haven't been able to finish one of these things clean, but to be that close is bittersweet. It hurts, but I got a lot of racing left and I'm a tough guy. I can handle it.”

== Race results ==
=== Stage results ===
Stage 1 Laps: 40

Pos	No	Driver	Team	Manufacturer	Points
1	2	Brad Keselowski	Team Penske	Ford	10
2	88	Dale Earnhardt Jr.	Hendrick Motorsports	Chevrolet	9
3	21	Ryan Blaney	Wood Brothers Racing	Ford	8
4	14	Clint Bowyer	Stewart–Haas Racing	Ford	7
5	22	Joey Logano	Team Penske	Ford	6
6	95	Michael McDowell	Leavine Family Racing	Chevrolet	5
7	1	Jamie McMurray	Chip Ganassi Racing	Chevrolet	4
8	41	Kurt Busch	Stewart–Haas Racing	Ford	3
9	20	Matt Kenseth	Joe Gibbs Racing	Toyota	2
10	38	David Ragan	Front Row Motorsports	Ford	1
Official stage one results

Stage 2 Laps: 40

Pos	No	Driver	Team	Manufacturer	Points
1	20	Matt Kenseth	Joe Gibbs Racing	Toyota	10
2	11	Denny Hamlin	Joe Gibbs Racing	Toyota	9
3	48	Jimmie Johnson	Hendrick Motorsports	Chevrolet	8
4	41	Kurt Busch	Stewart–Haas Racing	Ford	7
5	38	David Ragan	Front Row Motorsports	Ford	6
6	4	Kevin Harvick	Stewart–Haas Racing	Ford	5
7	5	Kasey Kahne	Hendrick Motorsports	Chevrolet	4
8	13	Ty Dillon (R)	Germain Racing	Chevrolet	3
9	43	Bubba Wallace (i)	Richard Petty Motorsports	Ford	0
10	21	Ryan Blaney	Wood Brothers Racing	Ford	1
Official stage two results

=== Final stage results ===
Stage 3 Laps: 83

Pos	Grid	No	Driver	Team	Manufacturer	Laps	Points
1	6	17	Ricky Stenhouse Jr.	Roush Fenway Racing	Ford	163	40
2	11	14	Clint Bowyer	Stewart–Haas Racing	Ford	163	42
3	24	27	Paul Menard	Richard Childress Racing	Chevrolet	163	34
4	23	95	Michael McDowell	Leavine Family Racing	Chevrolet	163	38
5	22	31	Ryan Newman	Richard Childress Racing	Chevrolet	163	32
6	30	38	David Ragan	Front Row Motorsports	Ford	163	38
7	32	75	Brendan Gaughan (i)	Beard Motorsports	Chevrolet	163	0
8	27	47	A. J. Allmendinger	JTG Daugherty Racing	Chevrolet	163	29
9	17	77	Erik Jones (R)	Furniture Row Racing	Toyota	163	28
10	29	37	Chris Buescher	JTG Daugherty Racing	Chevrolet	163	27
11	36	23	Corey LaJoie (R)	BK Racing	Toyota	163	26
12	12	48	Jimmie Johnson	Hendrick Motorsports	Chevrolet	163	33
13	28	32	Matt DiBenedetto	Go Fas Racing	Ford	163	24
14	8	1	Jamie McMurray	Chip Ganassi Racing	Chevrolet	163	27
15	31	43	Bubba Wallace (i)	Richard Petty Motorsports	Ford	163	0
16	34	13	Ty Dillon (R)	Germain Racing	Chevrolet	163	24
17	20	19	Daniel Suárez (R)	Joe Gibbs Racing	Toyota	163	20
18	4	5	Kasey Kahne	Hendrick Motorsports	Chevrolet	163	23
19	26	34	Landon Cassill	Front Row Motorsports	Ford	163	18
20	16	18	Kyle Busch	Joe Gibbs Racing	Toyota	163	17
21	33	7	Elliott Sadler (i)	Tommy Baldwin Racing	Chevrolet	163	0
22	3	24	Chase Elliott	Hendrick Motorsports	Chevrolet	162	15
23	14	6	Trevor Bayne	Roush Fenway Racing	Ford	160	14
24	18	11	Denny Hamlin	Joe Gibbs Racing	Toyota	157	22
25	10	10	Danica Patrick	Stewart–Haas Racing	Ford	154	12
26	9	21	Ryan Blaney	Wood Brothers Racing	Ford	154	20
27	13	20	Matt Kenseth	Joe Gibbs Racing	Toyota	154	22
28	15	41	Kurt Busch	Stewart–Haas Racing	Ford	153	19
29	21	42	Kyle Larson	Chip Ganassi Racing	Chevrolet	153	8
30	37	55	Reed Sorenson	Premium Motorsports	Toyota	147	7
31	3	2	Brad Keselowski	Team Penske	Ford	113	16
32	1	88	Dale Earnhardt Jr.	Hendrick Motorsports	Chevrolet	106	14
33	5	4	Kevin Harvick	Stewart–Haas Racing	Ford	105	9
34	25	78	Martin Truex Jr.	Furniture Row Racing	Toyota	73	3
35	7	22	Joey Logano	Team Penske	Ford	71	8
36	19	3	Austin Dillon	Richard Childress Racing	Chevrolet	70	1
37	39	33	Jeffrey Earnhardt	Circle Sport – The Motorsports Group	Chevrolet	57	1
38	40	15	D. J. Kennington	Premium Motorsports	Toyota	14	1
39	35	72	Cole Whitt	TriStar Motorsports	Chevrolet	9	1
40	38	83	Ryan Sieg (i)	BK Racing	Toyota	7	0
Official race results

=== Race statistics ===
- Lead changes: 33 among 16 different drivers
- Cautions/Laps: 14 for 51 laps
- Red flags: 1 for 8 minutes and 41 seconds
- Time of race: 3 hours, 17 minutes and 12 seconds
- Average speed: 123.986 miles per hour (199.536 km/h)

== Media ==
=== Television ===
NBC Sports covered the race on the television side; Rick Allen, Jeff Burton and Steve Letarte called the race from the broadcast booth, and Dave Burns, Parker Kligerman, Marty Snider and Kelli Stavast reported from pit lane.

NBC
Booth announcers	Pit reporters
Lap-by-lap: Rick Allen; Color commentator: Jeff Burton; Color commentator: Steve Letarte	Dave Burns; Parker Kligerman; Marty Snider; Kelli Stavast

=== Radio ===
MRN had the radio call for the race which was also simulcasted on SiriusXM's NASCAR Radio channel.

MRN Radio
Booth announcers	Turn announcers	Pit reporters
Lead announcer: Joe Moore; Announcer: Jeff Striegle; Announcer: Rusty Wallace	Turns 1 & 2: Dave Moody; Backstretch: Mike Bagley; Turns 3 & 4: Kyle Rickey	Alex Hayden; Winston Kelley; Kim Coon; Steve Post

== Standings after the race ==
Drivers' Championship standings

	Pos	Driver	Points
	1	Kyle Larson	667
	2	Martin Truex Jr.	649 (–18)
1	3	Kyle Busch	559 (–108)
1	4	Kevin Harvick	557 (–110)
	5	Brad Keselowski	535 (–132)
	6	Chase Elliott	524 (–143)
	7	Jimmie Johnson	516 (–151)
	8	Jamie McMurray	504 (–163)
	9	Denny Hamlin	498 (–169)
1	10	Clint Bowyer	469 (–198)
1	11	Matt Kenseth	445 (–222)
2	12	Joey Logano	442 (–225)
	13	Ryan Blaney	435 (–232)
	14	Kurt Busch	408 (–259)
	15	Ryan Newman	399 (–268)
1	16	Ricky Stenhouse Jr.	395 (–272)
Official driver's standings

Manufacturers' Championship standings

	Pos	Manufacturer	Points
1	1	Ford	613
1	2	Chevrolet	610 (–3)
	3	Toyota	572 (–41)
Official manufacturers' standings

- Note: Only the first 16 positions are included for the driver standings.
- . – Driver has clinched a position in the Monster Energy NASCAR Cup Series playoffs.

Previous race: 2017 Toyota/Save Mart 350	Monster Energy NASCAR Cup Series; 2017 season	Next race: 2017 Quaker State 400
