= 2019 O'Reilly Auto Parts 500 =

Seventh race of the 2019 Monster Energy Cup Series

Race details
- Race 7 of 36 in the 2019 Monster Energy NASCAR Cup Series
- Date: March 31, 2019
- Location: Texas Motor Speedway in Fort Worth, Texas
- Course: Permanent racing facility
- Course length: 1.5 miles (2.4 km)
- Distance: 334 laps, 501 mi (801.6 km)
- Average speed: 153.224 miles per hour (246.590 km/h)

Pole position
Driver	Jimmie Johnson	Hendrick Motorsports
- Time: 28.588

Most laps led
Driver	Kyle Busch	Joe Gibbs Racing
- Laps: 66

Winner
No. 11	Denny Hamlin	Joe Gibbs Racing

Television in the United States
- Network: Fox
- Announcers: Mike Joy, Jeff Gordon and Darrell Waltrip
- Nielsen ratings: 3.652 million

Radio in the United States
- Radio: PRN
- Booth announcers: Doug Rice and Mark Garrow
- Turn announcers: Rob Albright (1 & 2) and Pat Patterson (3 & 4)

The 2019 O'Reilly Auto Parts 500 was a Monster Energy NASCAR Cup Series race that was held on March 31, 2019, at Texas Motor Speedway in Fort Worth, Texas. Contested over 334 laps on the 1.5-mile (2.4 km) intermediate quad-oval, it was the seventh race of the 2019 Monster Energy NASCAR Cup Series season.

== Report ==
=== Background ===
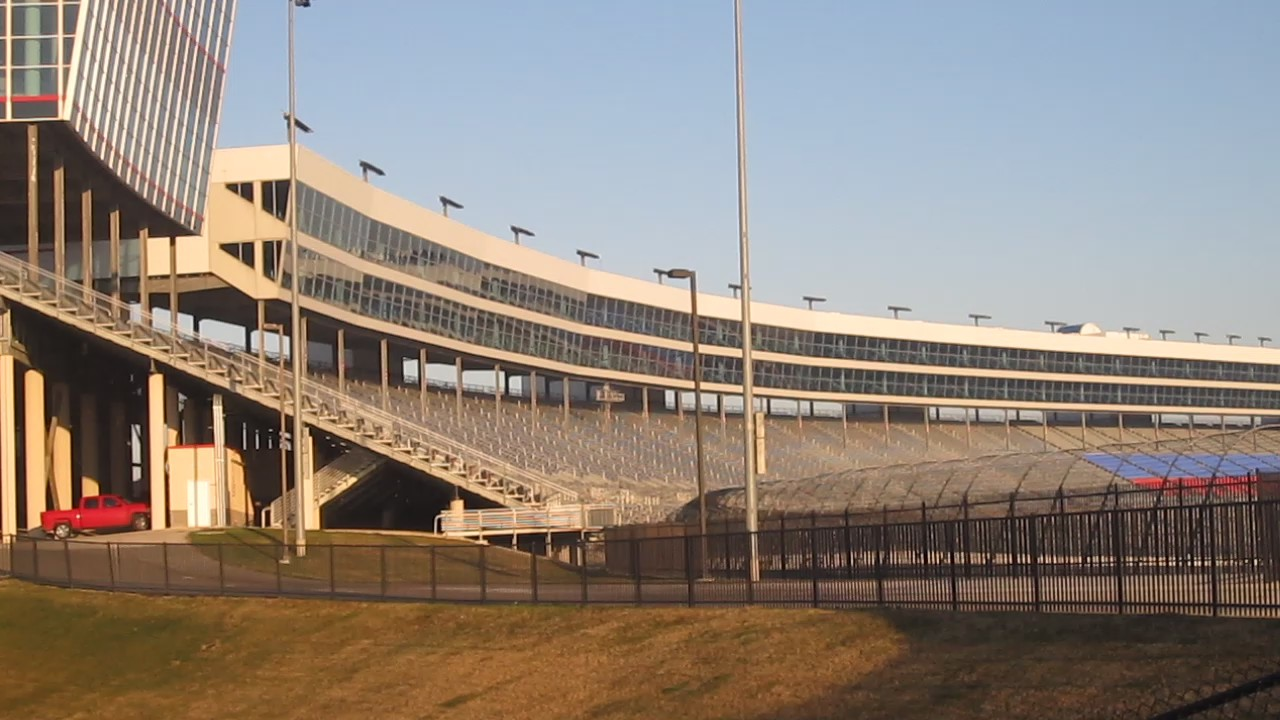
Texas Motor Speedway, the track where the race was held.

Texas Motor Speedway is a speedway located in the northernmost portion of the U.S. city of Fort Worth, Texas – the portion located in Denton County, Texas. The track measures 1.5 miles (2.4 km) around and is banked 24 degrees in the turns, and is of the oval design, where the front straightaway juts outward slightly. The track layout is similar to Atlanta Motor Speedway and Charlotte Motor Speedway (formerly Lowe's Motor Speedway). The track is owned by Speedway Motorsports, Inc., the same company that owns Atlanta and Charlotte Motor Speedways, as well as the short-track Bristol Motor Speedway.

==== Entry list ====
No.	Driver	Team	Manufacturer
00	Landon Cassill	StarCom Racing	Chevrolet
1	Kurt Busch	Chip Ganassi Racing	Chevrolet
2	Brad Keselowski	Team Penske	Ford
3	Austin Dillon	Richard Childress Racing	Chevrolet
4	Kevin Harvick	Stewart-Haas Racing	Ford
6	Ryan Newman	Roush Fenway Racing	Ford
8	Daniel Hemric (R)	Richard Childress Racing	Chevrolet
9	Chase Elliott	Hendrick Motorsports	Chevrolet
10	Aric Almirola	Stewart-Haas Racing	Ford
11	Denny Hamlin	Joe Gibbs Racing	Toyota
12	Ryan Blaney	Team Penske	Ford
13	Ty Dillon	Germain Racing	Chevrolet
14	Clint Bowyer	Stewart-Haas Racing	Ford
15	Ross Chastain (i)	Premium Motorsports	Chevrolet
17	Ricky Stenhouse Jr.	Roush Fenway Racing	Ford
18	Kyle Busch	Joe Gibbs Racing	Toyota
19	Martin Truex Jr.	Joe Gibbs Racing	Toyota
20	Erik Jones	Joe Gibbs Racing	Toyota
21	Paul Menard	Wood Brothers Racing	Ford
22	Joey Logano	Team Penske	Ford
24	William Byron	Hendrick Motorsports	Chevrolet
27	Reed Sorenson	Premium Motorsports	Chevrolet
32	Corey LaJoie	Go Fas Racing	Ford
34	Michael McDowell	Front Row Motorsports	Ford
36	Matt Tifft (R)	Front Row Motorsports	Ford
37	Chris Buescher	JTG Daugherty Racing	Chevrolet
38	David Ragan	Front Row Motorsports	Ford
41	Daniel Suárez	Stewart-Haas Racing	Ford
42	Kyle Larson	Chip Ganassi Racing	Chevrolet
43	Bubba Wallace	Richard Petty Motorsports	Chevrolet
47	Ryan Preece (R)	JTG Daugherty Racing	Chevrolet
48	Jimmie Johnson	Hendrick Motorsports	Chevrolet
51	B. J. McLeod (i)	Petty Ware Racing	Chevrolet
52	Bayley Currey (i)	Rick Ware Racing	Chevrolet
66	Timmy Hill (i)	MBM Motorsports	Toyota
77	Garrett Smithley (i)	Spire Motorsports	Chevrolet
88	Alex Bowman	Hendrick Motorsports	Chevrolet
95	Matt DiBenedetto	Leavine Family Racing	Toyota
96	Parker Kligerman (i)	Gaunt Brothers Racing	Toyota
Official entry list

== First practice ==
Jimmie Johnson was the fastest in the first practice session with a time of 28.459 seconds and a speed of 189.747 mph (305.368 km/h).

Pos	No.	Driver	Team	Manufacturer	Time	Speed
1	48	Jimmie Johnson	Hendrick Motorsports	Chevrolet	28.459	189.747
2	88	Alex Bowman	Hendrick Motorsports	Chevrolet	28.668	188.363
3	22	Joey Logano	Team Penske	Ford	28.668	188.180
Official first practice results

== Qualifying ==
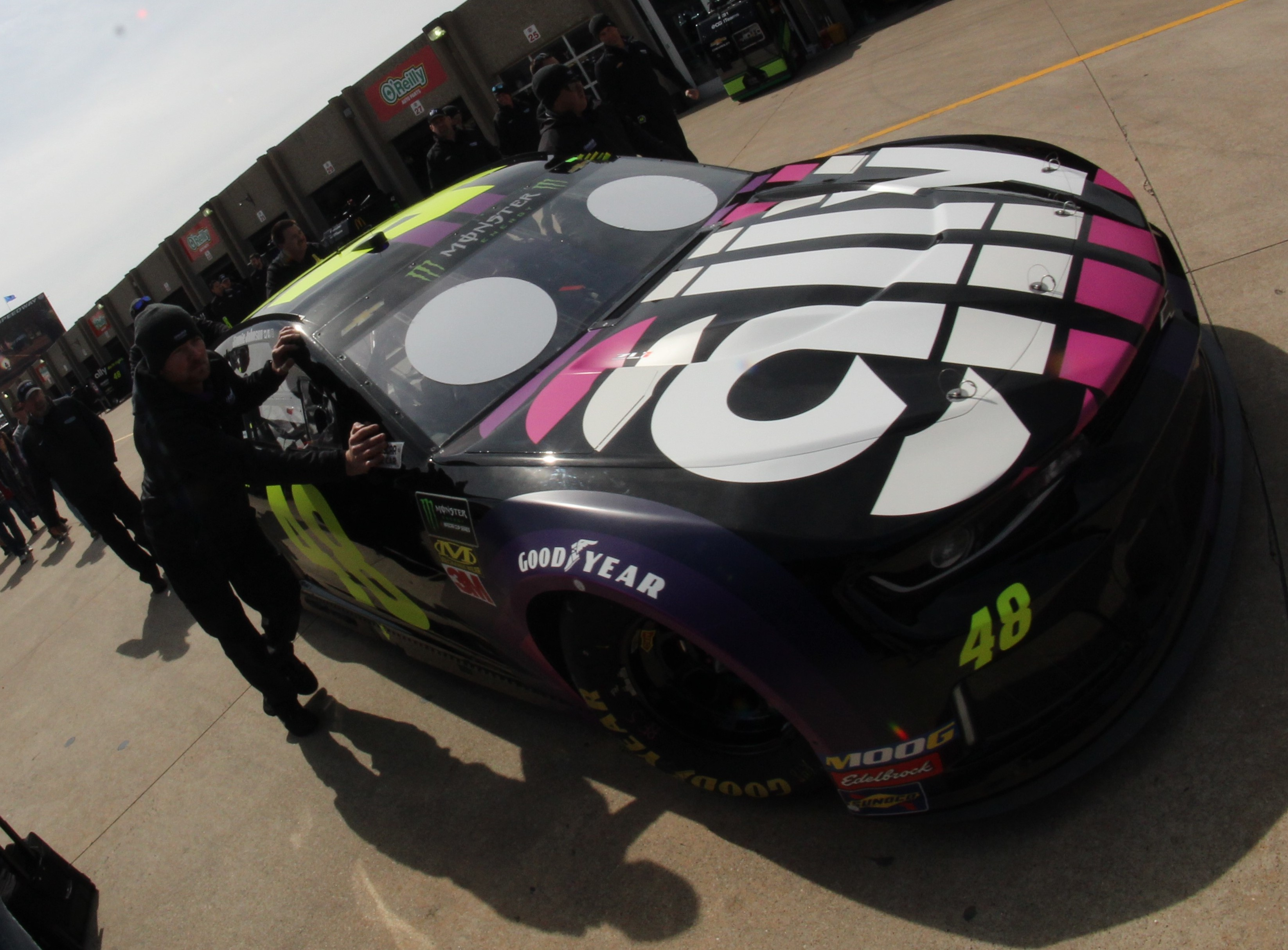
Jimmie Johnson started from pole position.

Jimmie Johnson scored the pole for the race with a time of 28.588 and a speed of 188.890 mph (303.989 km/h).

=== Qualifying results ===
Pos	No.	Driver	Team	Manufacturer	R1	R2	R3
1	48	Jimmie Johnson	Hendrick Motorsports	Chevrolet	28.628	28.730	28.588
2	24	William Byron	Hendrick Motorsports	Chevrolet	28.786	28.869	28.660
3	8	Daniel Hemric (R)	Richard Childress Racing	Chevrolet	28.877	28.736	28.678
4	9	Chase Elliott	Hendrick Motorsports	Chevrolet	28.862	28.899	28.682
5	41	Daniel Suárez	Stewart-Haas Racing	Ford	28.819	28.743	28.741
6	3	Austin Dillon	Richard Childress Racing	Chevrolet	28.704	28.856	28.862
7	11	Denny Hamlin	Joe Gibbs Racing	Toyota	29.068	28.816	28.895
8	22	Joey Logano	Team Penske	Ford	28.996	28.743	28.928
9	13	Ty Dillon	Germain Racing	Chevrolet	28.915	28.896	28.956
10	43	Bubba Wallace	Richard Petty Motorsports	Chevrolet	28.922	28.884	28.990
11	20	Erik Jones	Joe Gibbs Racing	Toyota	28.696	28.908	29.071
12	2	Brad Keselowski	Team Penske	Ford	29.016	28.847	29.412
13	12	Ryan Blaney	Team Penske	Ford	28.729	28.927	—
14	21	Paul Menard	Wood Brothers Racing	Ford	29.067	28.937	—
15	34	Michael McDowell	Front Row Motorsports	Ford	28.954	28.964	—
16	18	Kyle Busch	Joe Gibbs Racing	Toyota	28.888	28.971	—
17	17	Ricky Stenhouse Jr.	Roush Fenway Racing	Ford	28.922	28.971	—
18	6	Ryan Newman	Roush Fenway Racing	Ford	28.869	29.005	—
19	37	Chris Buescher	JTG Daugherty Racing	Chevrolet	28.948	29.016	—
20	19	Martin Truex Jr.	Joe Gibbs Racing	Toyota	28.914	29.161	—
21	10	Aric Almirola	Stewart-Haas Racing	Ford	28.886	29.226	—
22	42	Kyle Larson	Chip Ganassi Racing	Chevrolet	29.070	29.235	—
23	4	Kevin Harvick	Stewart-Haas Racing	Ford	29.011	29.239	—
24	88	Alex Bowman	Hendrick Motorsports	Chevrolet	28.992	0.000	—
25	14	Clint Bowyer	Stewart-Haas Racing	Ford	29.096	—	—
26	95	Matt DiBenedetto	Leavine Family Racing	Toyota	29.110	—	—
27	47	Ryan Preece (R)	JTG Daugherty Racing	Chevrolet	29.164	—	—
28	38	David Ragan	Front Row Motorsports	Ford	29.265	—	—
29	36	Matt Tifft (R)	Front Row Motorsports	Ford	29.265	—	—
30	1	Kurt Busch	Chip Ganassi Racing	Chevrolet	29.283	—	—
31	32	Corey LaJoie	Go Fas Racing	Ford	29.305	—	—
32	00	Landon Cassill	StarCom Racing	Chevrolet	29.429	—	—
33	96	Parker Kligerman (i)	Gaunt Brothers Racing	Toyota	29.549	—	—
34	51	B. J. McLeod (i)	Petty Ware Racing	Chevrolet	29.844	—	—
35	15	Ross Chastain (i)	Premium Motorsports	Chevrolet	29.987	—	—
36	52	Bayley Currey (i)	Rick Ware Racing	Chevrolet	30.235	—	—
37	27	Reed Sorenson	Premium Motorsports	Chevrolet	30.513	—	—
38	77	Garrett Smithley (i)	Spire Motorsports	Chevrolet	30.530	—	—
39	66	Timmy Hill (i)	MBM Motorsports	Toyota	31.416	—	—
Official qualifying results

== Practice (post-qualifying) ==
=== Second practice ===
Second practice session scheduled for Saturday was cancelled due to rain.

=== Final practice ===
Denny Hamlin was the fastest in the final practice session with a time of 28.879 seconds and a speed of 186.987 mph (300.926 km/h).

Pos	No.	Driver	Team	Manufacturer	Time	Speed
1	11	Denny Hamlin	Joe Gibbs Racing	Toyota	28.879	186.987
2	18	Kyle Busch	Joe Gibbs Racing	Toyota	28.979	186.342
3	12	Ryan Blaney	Team Penske	Ford	28.989	186.278
Official final practice results

== Race ==
=== Stage Results ===
Stage One Laps: 85

Pos	No	Driver	Team	Manufacturer	Points
1	22	Joey Logano	Team Penske	Ford	10
2	48	Jimmie Johnson	Hendrick Motorsports	Chevrolet	9
3	9	Chase Elliott	Hendrick Motorsports	Chevrolet	8
4	3	Austin Dillon	Richard Childress Racing	Chevrolet	7
5	12	Ryan Blaney	Team Penske	Ford	6
6	21	Paul Menard	Wood Brothers Racing	Ford	5
7	41	Daniel Suárez	Stewart-Haas Racing	Ford	4
8	18	Kyle Busch	Joe Gibbs Racing	Toyota	3
9	42	Kyle Larson	Chip Ganassi Racing	Chevrolet	2
10	37	Chris Buescher	JTG Daugherty Racing	Chevrolet	1
Official stage one results

Stage Two Laps: 85

Pos	No	Driver	Team	Manufacturer	Points
1	11	Denny Hamlin	Joe Gibbs Racing	Toyota	10
2	12	Ryan Blaney	Team Penske	Ford	9
3	41	Daniel Suárez	Stewart-Haas Racing	Ford	8
4	18	Kyle Busch	Joe Gibbs Racing	Toyota	7
5	21	Paul Menard	Wood Brothers Racing	Ford	6
6	6	Ryan Newman	Roush Fenway Racing	Ford	5
7	17	Ricky Stenhouse Jr.	Roush Fenway Racing	Ford	4
8	24	William Byron	Hendrick Motorsports	Chevrolet	3
9	34	Michael McDowell	Front Row Motorsports	Ford	2
10	48	Jimmie Johnson	Hendrick Motorsports	Chevrolet	1
Official stage two results

=== Final Stage Results ===
Stage Three

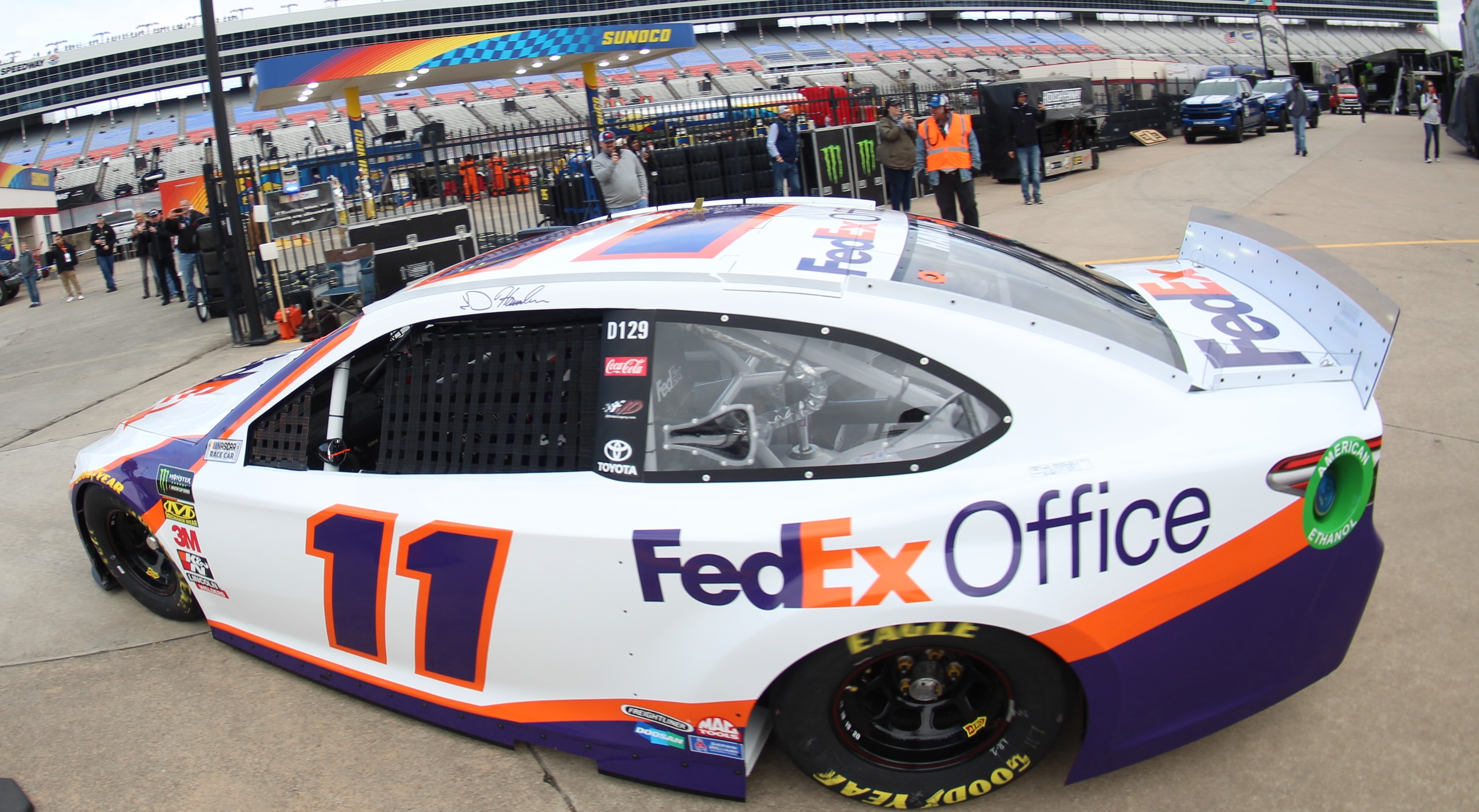
Denny Hamlin won the race.

Laps: 164

Pos	Grid	No	Driver	Team	Manufacturer	Laps	Points
1	6	11	Denny Hamlin	Joe Gibbs Racing	Toyota	334	50
2	25	14	Clint Bowyer	Stewart-Haas Racing	Ford	334	35
3	4	41	Daniel Suárez	Stewart-Haas Racing	Ford	334	46
4	11	20	Erik Jones	Joe Gibbs Racing	Toyota	334	33
5	1	48	Jimmie Johnson	Hendrick Motorsports	Chevrolet	334	42
6	2	24	William Byron	Hendrick Motorsports	Chevrolet	334	34
7	21	10	Aric Almirola	Stewart-Haas Racing	Ford	334	30
8	23	4	Kevin Harvick	Stewart-Haas Racing	Ford	334	29
9	30	1	Kurt Busch	Chip Ganassi Racing	Chevrolet	334	28
10	16	18	Kyle Busch	Joe Gibbs Racing	Toyota	334	37
11	18	6	Ryan Newman	Roush Fenway Racing	Ford	334	31
12	20	19	Martin Truex Jr.	Joe Gibbs Racing	Toyota	334	25
13	3	9	Chase Elliott	Hendrick Motorsports	Chevrolet	334	32
14	5	3	Austin Dillon	Richard Childress Racing	Chevrolet	334	30
15	15	34	Michael McDowell	Front Row Motorsports	Ford	334	24
16	17	17	Ricky Stenhouse Jr.	Roush Fenway Racing	Ford	333	25
17	8	22	Joey Logano	Team Penske	Ford	333	30
18	24	88	Alex Bowman	Hendrick Motorsports	Chevrolet	333	19
19	14	21	Paul Menard	Wood Brothers Racing	Ford	333	29
20	19	37	Chris Buescher	JTG Daugherty Racing	Chevrolet	333	18
21	9	13	Ty Dillon	Germain Racing	Chevrolet	332	16
22	27	47	Ryan Preece (R)	JTG Daugherty Racing	Chevrolet	332	15
23	10	43	Bubba Wallace	Richard Petty Motorsports	Chevrolet	332	14
24	29	36	Matt Tifft (R)	Front Row Motorsports	Ford	332	13
25	28	38	David Ragan	Front Row Motorsports	Ford	331	12
26	26	95	Matt DiBenedetto	Leavine Family Racing	Toyota	331	11
27	33	96	Parker Kligerman (i)	Gaunt Brothers Racing	Toyota	330	0
28	31	32	Corey LaJoie	Go Fas Racing	Ford	330	9
29	35	15	Ross Chastain (i)	Premium Motorsports	Chevrolet	329	0
30	32	00	Landon Cassill	StarCom Racing	Chevrolet	326	7
31	34	51	B. J. McLeod (i)	Petty Ware Racing	Chevrolet	325	0
32	38	77	Garrett Smithley (i)	Spire Motorsports	Chevrolet	325	0
33	7	8	Daniel Hemric (R)	Richard Childress Racing	Chevrolet	324	4
34	37	27	Reed Sorenson	Premium Motorsports	Chevrolet	322	3
35	36	52	Bayley Currey (i)	Rick Ware Racing	Chevrolet	320	0
36	12	2	Brad Keselowski	Team Penske	Ford	279	1
37	13	12	Ryan Blaney	Team Penske	Ford	225	16
38	39	66	Timmy Hill (i)	MBM Motorsports	Toyota	168	0
39	22	42	Kyle Larson	Chip Ganassi Racing	Chevrolet	147	3
Official race results

=== Race statistics ===
- Lead changes: 26 among 13 different drivers
- Cautions/Laps: 5 for 29
- Red flags: 0
- Time of race: 3 hours, 16 minutes and 11 seconds
- Average speed: 153.224 miles per hour (246.590 km/h)

== Media ==
=== Television ===
Fox Sports covered their 19th race at the Texas Motor Speedway. Mike Joy, 2009 race winner Jeff Gordon and Darrell Waltrip had the call in the booth for the race. Jamie Little, Vince Welch and Matt Yocum handled the pit road duties for the television side.

Fox
Booth announcers	Pit reporters
Lap-by-lap: Mike Joy; Color-commentator: Jeff Gordon; Color commentator: Darrell Waltrip	Jamie Little; Vince Welch; Matt Yocum

=== Radio ===
The race was broadcast on radio by the Performance Racing Network and simulcast on Sirius XM NASCAR Radio.

PRN
Booth announcers	Turn announcers	Pit reporters
Lead announcer: Doug Rice; Announcer: Mark Garrow	Turns 1 & 2: Rob Albright; Turns 3 & 4: Pat Patterson	Brad Gillie; Brett McMillan; Jim Noble; Wendy Venturini

== Standings after the race ==
Drivers' Championship standings

	Pos	Driver	Points
	1	Kyle Busch	310
	2	Denny Hamlin	302 (–8)
	3	Kevin Harvick	277 (–33)
	4	Joey Logano	275 (–35)
1	5	Aric Almirola	245 (–65)
1	6	Brad Keselowski	237 (–73)
	7	Martin Truex Jr.	232 (–78)
	8	Ryan Blaney	219 (–91)
	9	Chase Elliott	218 (–92)
	10	Kurt Busch	213 (–97)
2	11	Clint Bowyer	192 (–118)
1	12	Kyle Larson	185 (–125)
1	13	Ricky Stenhouse Jr.	183 (–127)
2	14	Daniel Suárez	180 (–130)
	15	Jimmie Johnson	176 (–134)
2	16	Erik Jones	173 (–137)
Official driver's standings

Manufacturers' Championship standings

Pos	Manufacturer	Points
1	Toyota	263
2	Ford	257 (–6)
3	Chevrolet	226 (–37)

- Note: Only the first 16 positions are included for the driver standings.
- . – Driver has clinched a position in the Monster Energy NASCAR Cup Series playoffs.

Previous race: 2019 STP 500	Monster Energy NASCAR Cup Series; 2019 season	Next race: 2019 Food City 500
