= 2019 STP 500 =

Sixth race of the 2019 Monster Energy Cup Series

Race details
- Race 6 of 36 in the 2019 Monster Energy NASCAR Cup Series
- Date: March 24, 2019
- Location: Martinsville Speedway in Ridgeway, Virginia
- Course: Permanent racing facility
- Course length: 0.526 miles (0.847 km)
- Distance: 500 laps, 263 mi (423.5 km)
- Average speed: 78.158 miles per hour (125.783 km/h)

Pole position
Driver	Joey Logano	Team Penske
- Time: 19.356

Most laps led
Driver	Brad Keselowski	Team Penske
- Laps: 446

Winner
No. 2	Brad Keselowski	Team Penske

Television in the United States
- Network: FS1
- Announcers: Mike Joy, Jeff Gordon and Darrell Waltrip
- Nielsen ratings: 2.455 million

Radio in the United States
- Radio: MRN
- Booth announcers: Alex Hayden, Jeff Striegle, and Rusty Wallace
- Turn announcers: Dave Moody (Backstretch)

The 2019 STP 500 was a Monster Energy NASCAR Cup Series race that was held on March 24, 2019, at Martinsville Speedway in Ridgeway, Virginia. Contested over 500 laps on the .526 mile (.847 km) paperclip-shaped short track, it was the sixth race of the 2019 Monster Energy NASCAR Cup Series season.

== Report ==
=== Background ===
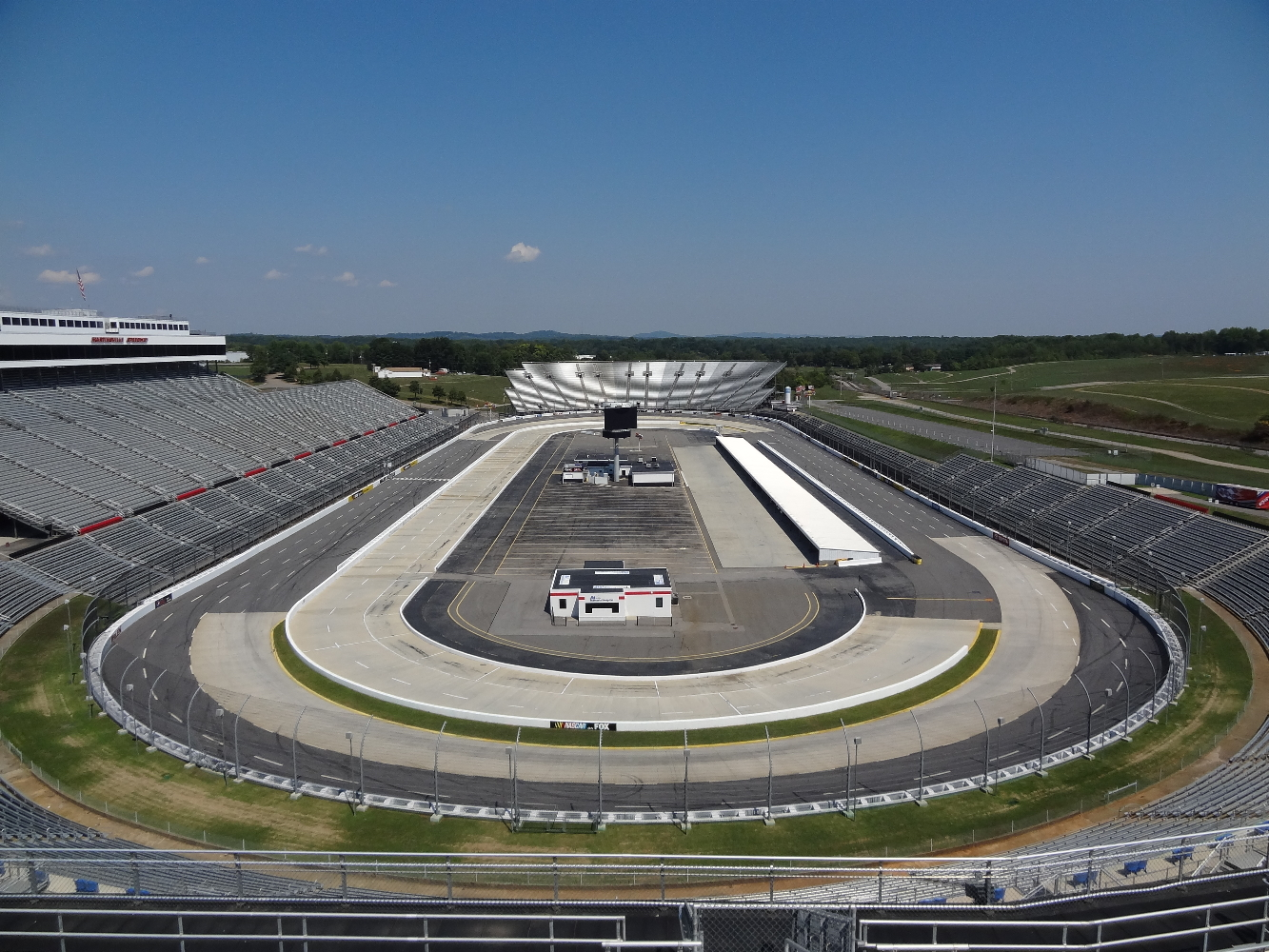
Martinsville Speedway, the track where the race was held.

Martinsville Speedway is an International Speedway Corporation-owned NASCAR stock car racing track located in Henry County, in Ridgeway, Virginia, just to the south of Martinsville. At 0.526 miles (0.847 km) in length, it is the shortest track in the Monster Energy NASCAR Cup Series. The track was also one of the first paved oval tracks in NASCAR, being built in 1947 by H. Clay Earles. It is also the only remaining race track that has been on the NASCAR circuit from its beginning in 1948.

==== Entry list ====
No.	Driver	Team	Manufacturer
00	Landon Cassill	StarCom Racing	Chevrolet
1	Kurt Busch	Chip Ganassi Racing	Chevrolet
2	Brad Keselowski	Team Penske	Ford
3	Austin Dillon	Richard Childress Racing	Chevrolet
4	Kevin Harvick	Stewart-Haas Racing	Ford
6	Ryan Newman	Roush Fenway Racing	Ford
8	Daniel Hemric (R)	Richard Childress Racing	Chevrolet
9	Chase Elliott	Hendrick Motorsports	Chevrolet
10	Aric Almirola	Stewart-Haas Racing	Ford
11	Denny Hamlin	Joe Gibbs Racing	Toyota
12	Ryan Blaney	Team Penske	Ford
13	Ty Dillon	Germain Racing	Chevrolet
14	Clint Bowyer	Stewart-Haas Racing	Ford
15	Ross Chastain (i)	Premium Motorsports	Chevrolet
17	Ricky Stenhouse Jr.	Roush Fenway Racing	Ford
18	Kyle Busch	Joe Gibbs Racing	Toyota
19	Martin Truex Jr.	Joe Gibbs Racing	Toyota
20	Erik Jones	Joe Gibbs Racing	Toyota
21	Paul Menard	Wood Brothers Racing	Ford
22	Joey Logano	Team Penske	Ford
24	William Byron	Hendrick Motorsports	Chevrolet
32	Corey LaJoie	Go Fas Racing	Ford
34	Michael McDowell	Front Row Motorsports	Ford
36	Matt Tifft (R)	Front Row Motorsports	Ford
37	Chris Buescher	JTG Daugherty Racing	Chevrolet
38	David Ragan	Front Row Motorsports	Ford
41	Daniel Suárez	Stewart-Haas Racing	Ford
42	Kyle Larson	Chip Ganassi Racing	Chevrolet
43	Bubba Wallace	Richard Petty Motorsports	Chevrolet
47	Ryan Preece (R)	JTG Daugherty Racing	Chevrolet
48	Jimmie Johnson	Hendrick Motorsports	Chevrolet
51	Cody Ware (R)	Petty Ware Racing	Chevrolet
52	Jeb Burton (i)	Rick Ware Racing	Chevrolet
77	D. J. Kennington (i)	Spire Motorsports	Chevrolet
88	Alex Bowman	Hendrick Motorsports	Chevrolet
95	Matt DiBenedetto	Leavine Family Racing	Toyota
Official entry list

== Practice ==
=== First practice ===
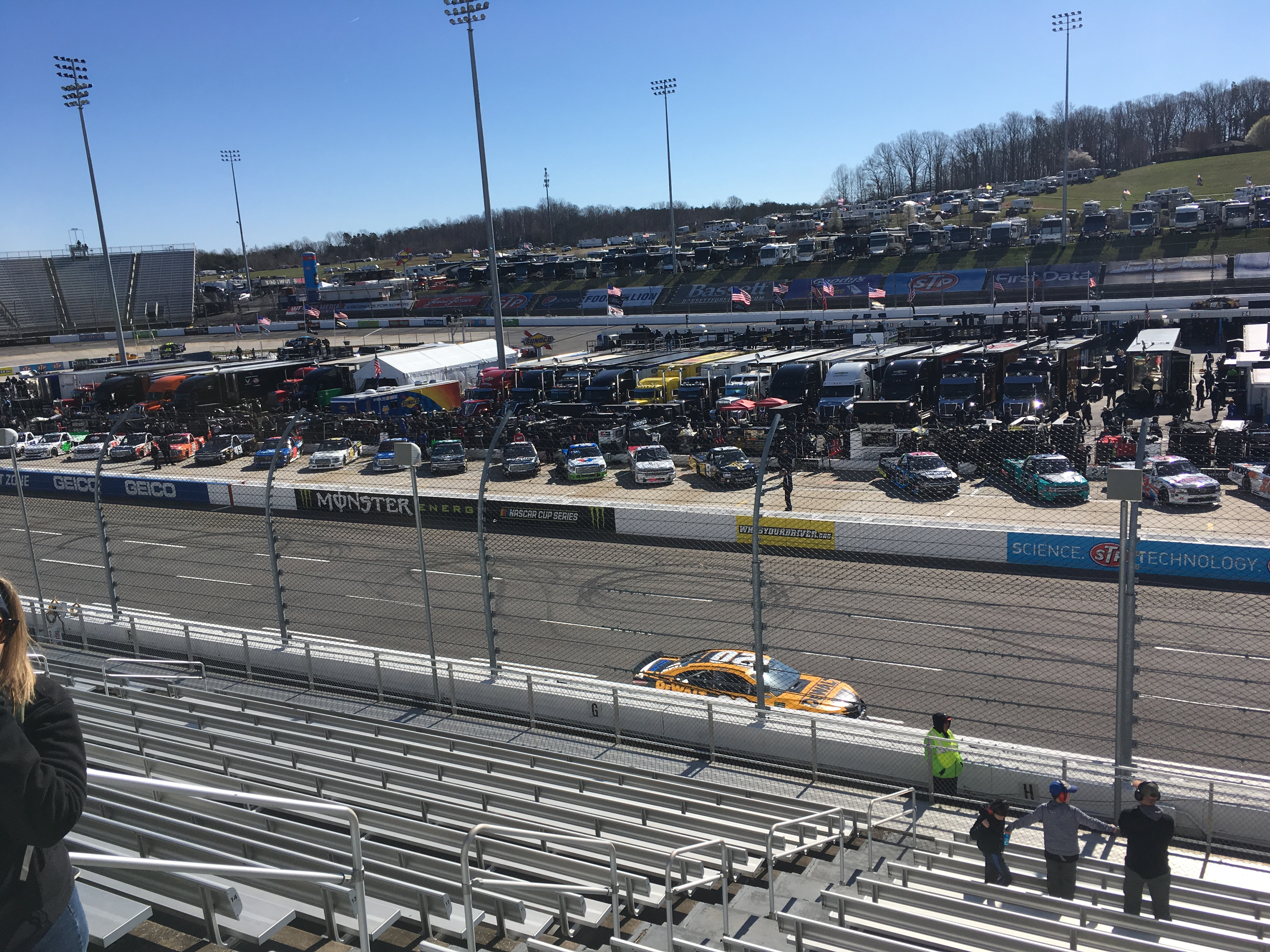
First practice

Clint Bowyer was the fastest in the first practice session with a time of 19.387 seconds and a speed of 97.674 mph (157.191 km/h).

Pos	No.	Driver	Team	Manufacturer	Time	Speed
1	14	Clint Bowyer	Stewart-Haas Racing	Ford	19.387	97.674
2	41	Daniel Suárez	Stewart-Haas Racing	Ford	19.470	97.257
3	10	Aric Almirola	Stewart-Haas Racing	Ford	19.521	97.003
Official first practice results

=== Final practice ===
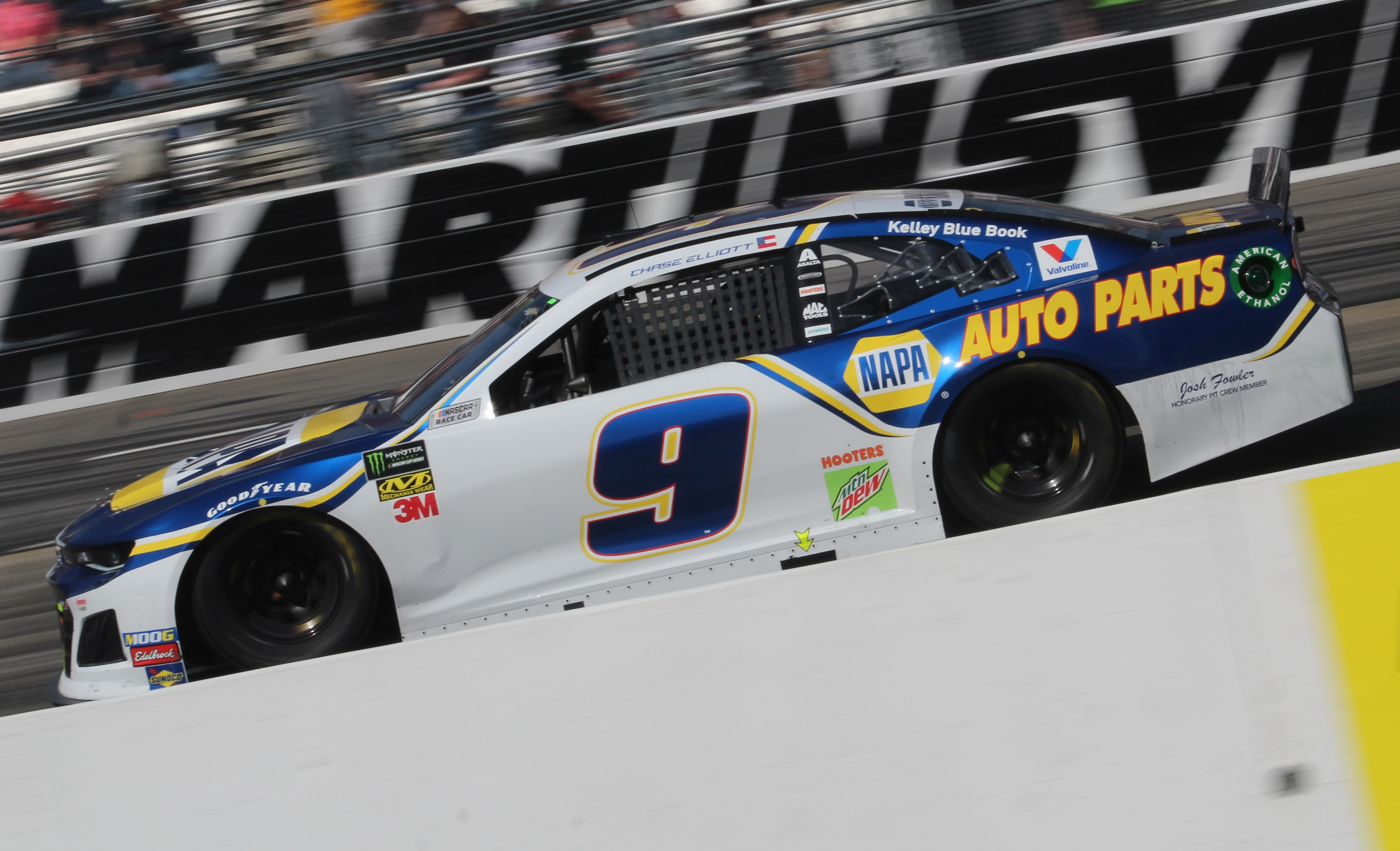
Chase Elliott was the fastest in the final practice.

Chase Elliott was the fastest in the final practice session with a time of 19.413 seconds and a speed of 97.543 mph (156.980 km/h).

Pos	No.	Driver	Team	Manufacturer	Time	Speed
1	9	Chase Elliott	Hendrick Motorsports	Chevrolet	19.413	97.543
2	88	Alex Bowman	Hendrick Motorsports	Chevrolet	19.597	96.627
3	48	Jimmie Johnson	Hendrick Motorsports	Chevrolet	19.600	96.612
Official final practice results

== Qualifying ==
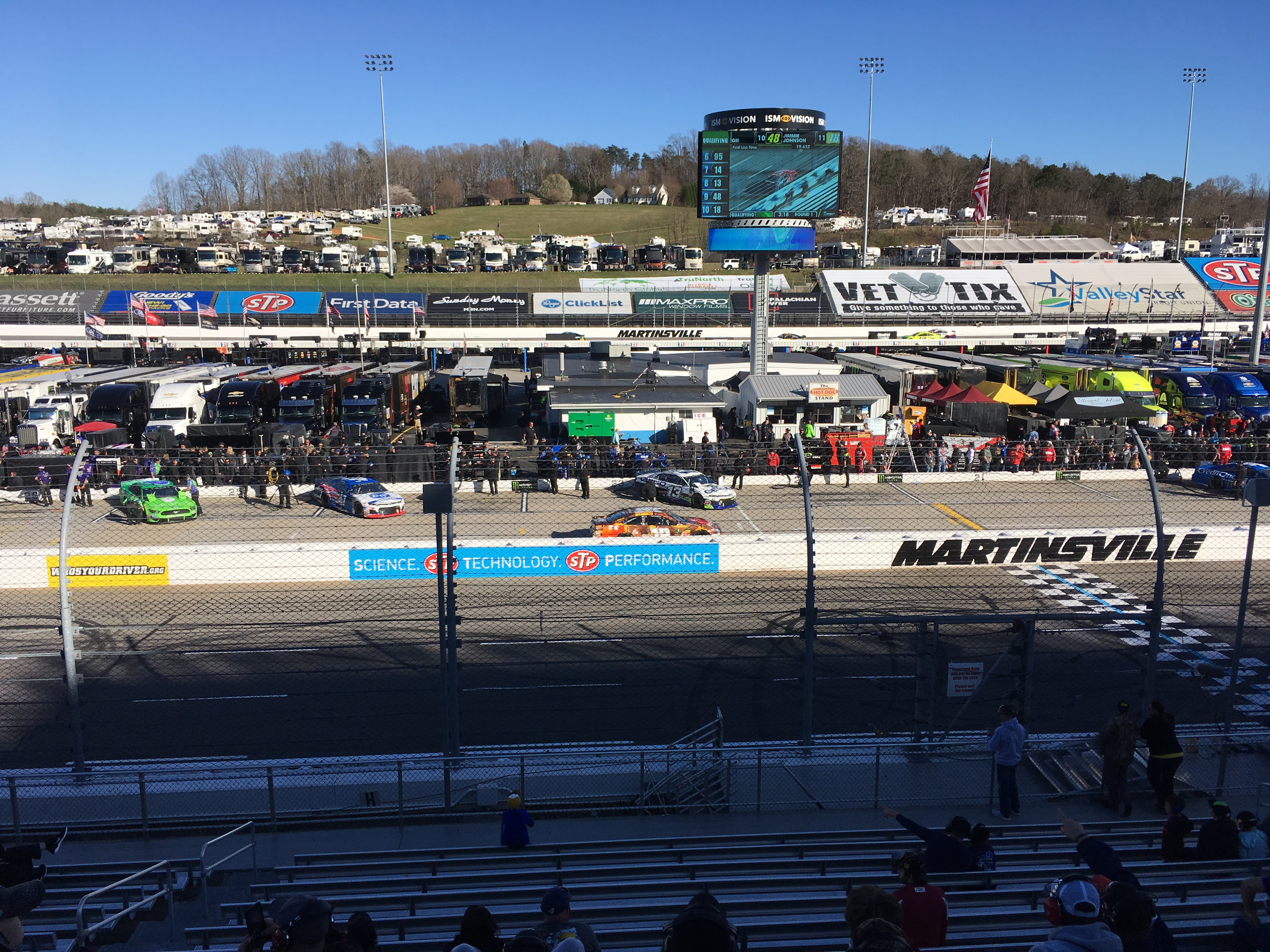
Qualifying for the race

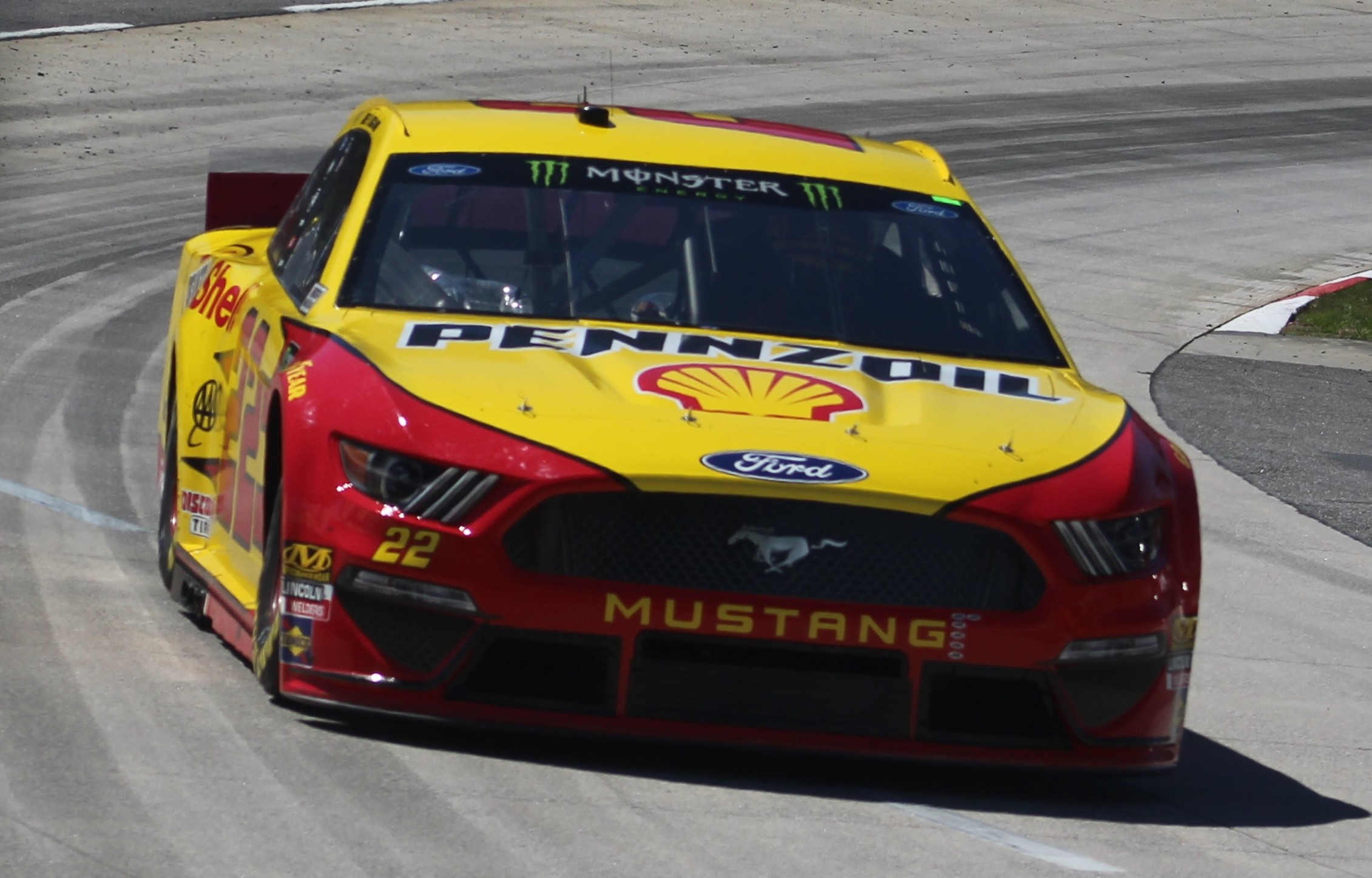
Joey Logano started from pole position.

Joey Logano scored the pole for the race with a time of 19.356 and a speed of 97.830 mph (157.442 km/h).

=== Qualifying results ===
Pos	No.	Driver	Team	Manufacturer	R1	R2	R3
1	22	Joey Logano	Team Penske	Ford	19.476	19.462	19.356
2	10	Aric Almirola	Stewart-Haas Racing	Ford	19.453	19.429	19.393
3	2	Brad Keselowski	Team Penske	Ford	19.430	19.474	19.430
4	4	Kevin Harvick	Stewart-Haas Racing	Ford	19.462	19.423	19.445
5	11	Denny Hamlin	Joe Gibbs Racing	Toyota	19.355	19.385	19.449
6	24	William Byron	Hendrick Motorsports	Chevrolet	19.530	19.551	19.481
7	42	Kyle Larson	Chip Ganassi Racing	Chevrolet	19.462	19.445	19.502
8	9	Chase Elliott	Hendrick Motorsports	Chevrolet	19.548	19.432	19.511
9	19	Martin Truex Jr.	Joe Gibbs Racing	Toyota	19.587	19.529	19.518
10	41	Daniel Suárez	Stewart-Haas Racing	Ford	19.505	19.497	19.556
11	14	Clint Bowyer	Stewart-Haas Racing	Ford	19.580	19.560	19.581
12	48	Jimmie Johnson	Hendrick Motorsports	Chevrolet	19.579	19.550	19.608
13	37	Chris Buescher	JTG Daugherty Racing	Chevrolet	19.571	19.571	—
14	18	Kyle Busch	Joe Gibbs Racing	Toyota	19.635	19.579	—
15	21	Paul Menard	Wood Brothers Racing	Ford	19.545	19.583	—
16	47	Ryan Preece (R)	JTG Daugherty Racing	Chevrolet	19.496	19.588	—
17	88	Alex Bowman	Hendrick Motorsports	Chevrolet	19.580	19.593	—
18	12	Ryan Blaney	Team Penske	Ford	19.501	19.602	—
19	20	Erik Jones	Joe Gibbs Racing	Toyota	19.597	19.602	—
20	1	Kurt Busch	Chip Ganassi Racing	Chevrolet	19.572	19.623	—
21	6	Ryan Newman	Roush Fenway Racing	Ford	19.570	19.626	—
22	95	Matt DiBenedetto	Leavine Family Racing	Toyota	19.575	19.630	—
23	13	Ty Dillon	Germain Racing	Chevrolet	19.591	19.652	—
24	34	Michael McDowell	Front Row Motorsports	Ford	19.636	19.695	—
25	17	Ricky Stenhouse Jr.	Roush Fenway Racing	Ford	19.664	—	—
26	38	David Ragan	Front Row Motorsports	Ford	19.703	—	—
27	43	Bubba Wallace	Richard Petty Motorsports	Chevrolet	19.742	—	—
28	00	Landon Cassill	StarCom Racing	Chevrolet	19.785	—	—
29	8	Daniel Hemric (R)	Richard Childress Racing	Chevrolet	19.807	—	—
30	3	Austin Dillon	Richard Childress Racing	Chevrolet	19.814	—	—
31	15	Ross Chastain (i)	Premium Motorsports	Chevrolet	19.846	—	—
32	36	Matt Tifft (R)	Front Row Motorsports	Ford	19.846	—	—
33	52	Jeb Burton (i)	Rick Ware Racing	Chevrolet	19.998	—	—
34	77	D. J. Kennington (i)	Spire Motorsports	Chevrolet	20.013	—	—
35	32	Corey LaJoie	Go Fas Racing	Ford	0.000	—	—
36	51	Cody Ware (R)	Petty Ware Racing	Chevrolet	0.000	—	—
Official qualifying results

- William Byron, D. J. Kennington, and Jeb Burton all starting at the back due to failing inspection.

== Race ==
=== Stage Results ===
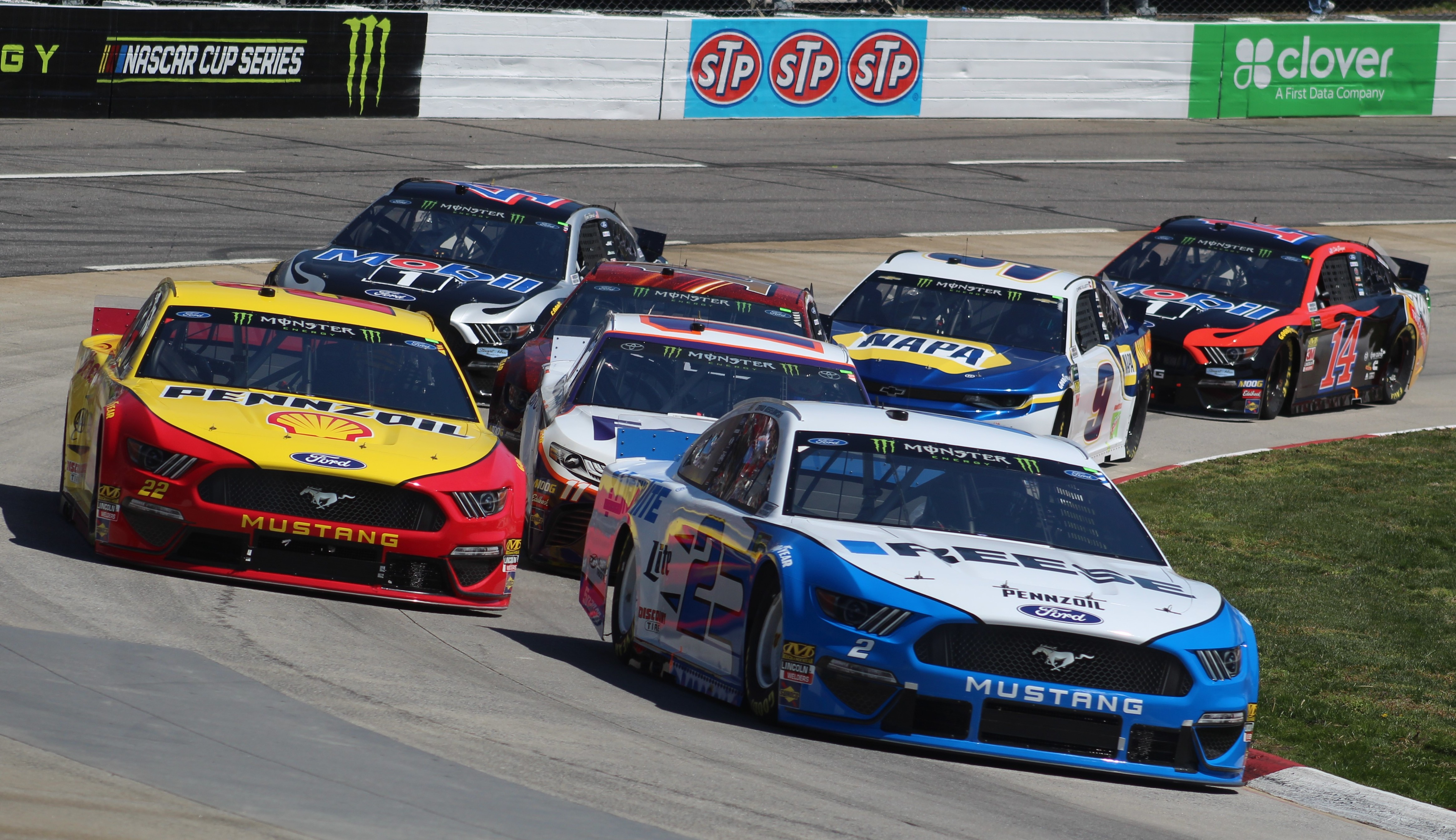
Brad Keselowski swept all stages.

Stage One Laps: 130

Pos	No	Driver	Team	Manufacturer	Points
1	2	Brad Keselowski	Team Penske	Ford	10
2	9	Chase Elliott	Hendrick Motorsports	Chevrolet	9
3	10	Aric Almirola	Stewart-Haas Racing	Ford	8
4	11	Denny Hamlin	Joe Gibbs Racing	Toyota	7
5	12	Ryan Blaney	Team Penske	Ford	6
6	14	Clint Bowyer	Stewart-Haas Racing	Ford	5
7	22	Joey Logano	Team Penske	Ford	4
8	19	Martin Truex Jr.	Joe Gibbs Racing	Toyota	3
9	18	Kyle Busch	Joe Gibbs Racing	Toyota	2
10	3	Austin Dillon	Richard Childress Racing	Chevrolet	1
Official stage one results

Stage Two Laps: 130

Pos	No	Driver	Team	Manufacturer	Points
1	2	Brad Keselowski	Team Penske	Ford	10
2	12	Ryan Blaney	Team Penske	Ford	9
3	11	Denny Hamlin	Joe Gibbs Racing	Toyota	8
4	9	Chase Elliott	Hendrick Motorsports	Chevrolet	7
5	19	Martin Truex Jr.	Joe Gibbs Racing	Toyota	6
6	10	Aric Almirola	Stewart-Haas Racing	Ford	5
7	4	Kevin Harvick	Stewart-Haas Racing	Ford	4
8	14	Clint Bowyer	Stewart-Haas Racing	Ford	3
9	41	Daniel Suárez	Stewart-Haas Racing	Ford	2
10	22	Joey Logano	Team Penske	Ford	1
Official stage two results

=== Final Stage Results ===
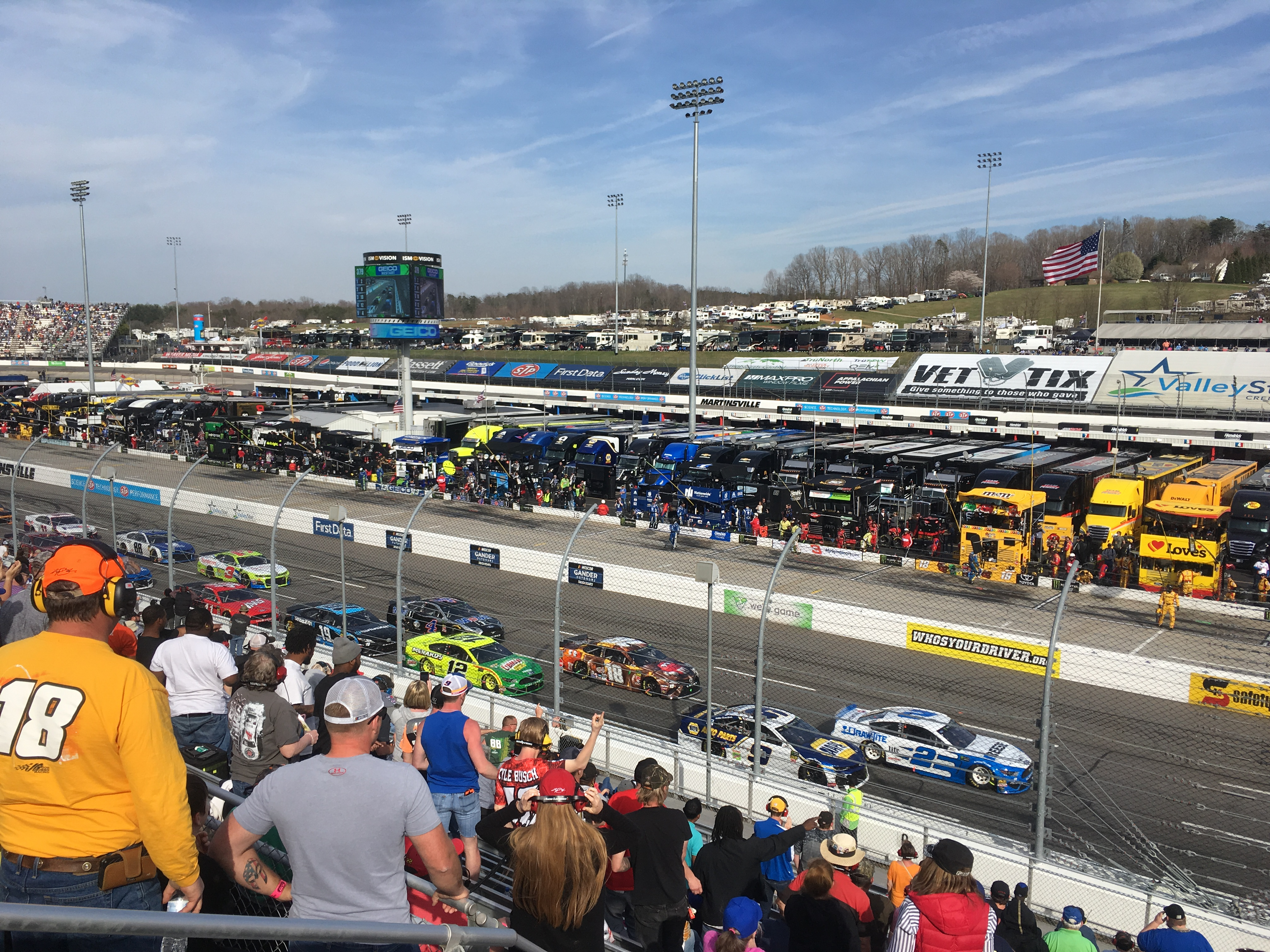
Brad Keselowski leads the race following a restart

Stage Three Laps: 240

Pos	Grid	No	Driver	Team	Manufacturer	Laps	Points
1	3	2	Brad Keselowski	Team Penske	Ford	500	60
2	7	9	Chase Elliott	Hendrick Motorsports	Chevrolet	500	51
3	13	18	Kyle Busch	Joe Gibbs Racing	Toyota	500	36
4	17	12	Ryan Blaney	Team Penske	Ford	500	48
5	5	11	Denny Hamlin	Joe Gibbs Racing	Toyota	500	47
6	4	4	Kevin Harvick	Stewart-Haas Racing	Ford	500	35
7	10	14	Clint Bowyer	Stewart-Haas Racing	Ford	500	38
8	8	19	Martin Truex Jr.	Joe Gibbs Racing	Toyota	500	38
9	2	10	Aric Almirola	Stewart-Haas Racing	Ford	500	41
10	9	41	Daniel Suárez	Stewart-Haas Racing	Ford	500	29
11	29	3	Austin Dillon	Richard Childress Racing	Chevrolet	500	27
12	19	1	Kurt Busch	Chip Ganassi Racing	Chevrolet	500	25
13	22	13	Ty Dillon	Germain Racing	Chevrolet	500	24
14	16	88	Alex Bowman	Hendrick Motorsports	Chevrolet	500	23
15	14	21	Paul Menard	Wood Brothers Racing	Ford	500	22
16	15	47	Ryan Preece (R)	JTG Daugherty Racing	Chevrolet	500	21
17	26	43	Bubba Wallace	Richard Petty Motorsports	Chevrolet	500	20
18	6	42	Kyle Larson	Chip Ganassi Racing	Chevrolet	500	19
19	1	22	Joey Logano	Team Penske	Ford	500	23
20	21	95	Matt DiBenedetto	Leavine Family Racing	Toyota	500	17
21	12	37	Chris Buescher	JTG Daugherty Racing	Chevrolet	499	16
22	34	24	William Byron	Hendrick Motorsports	Chevrolet	499	15
23	20	6	Ryan Newman	Roush Fenway Racing	Ford	499	14
24	11	48	Jimmie Johnson	Hendrick Motorsports	Chevrolet	498	13
25	24	17	Ricky Stenhouse Jr.	Roush Fenway Racing	Ford	498	12
26	25	38	David Ragan	Front Row Motorsports	Ford	496	11
27	28	8	Daniel Hemric (R)	Richard Childress Racing	Chevrolet	496	10
28	27	00	Landon Cassill	StarCom Racing	Chevrolet	494	9
29	31	36	Matt Tifft (R)	Front Row Motorsports	Ford	494	8
30	18	20	Erik Jones	Joe Gibbs Racing	Toyota	491	7
31	23	34	Michael McDowell	Front Row Motorsports	Ford	491	6
32	35	77	D. J. Kennington (i)	Spire Motorsports	Chevrolet	489	0
33	32	32	Corey LaJoie	Go Fas Racing	Ford	489	4
34	30	15	Ross Chastain (i)	Premium Motorsports	Chevrolet	365	0
35	36	52	Jeb Burton (i)	Rick Ware Racing	Chevrolet	163	0
36	33	51	Cody Ware (R)	Petty Ware Racing	Chevrolet	55	1
Official race results

=== Race statistics ===
- Lead changes: 4 among 3 different drivers (Laps Led: Keselowski (446), Elliott (49), Logano (5))
- Cautions/Laps: 7 for 56
- Red flags: 0
- Time of race: 3 hours, 21 minutes and 54 seconds
- Average speed: 78.158 miles per hour (125.783 km/h)

== Media ==
=== Television ===
Fox Sports covered their 19th race at the Martinsville Speedway. Mike Joy, nine-time Martinsville winner Jeff Gordon and 11-time Martinsville winner Darrell Waltrip called the race from the booth. Jamie Little, Vince Welch and Matt Yocum handled pit road duties for the entire race.

FS1
Booth announcers	Pit reporters
Lap-by-lap: Mike Joy; Color-commentator: Jeff Gordon; Color commentator: Darrell Waltrip	Jamie Little; Vince Welch; Matt Yocum

=== Radio ===
MRN had the radio call for the race which was also simulcasted on Sirius XM NASCAR Radio. Alex Hayden, Jeff Striegle and seven-time Martinsville winner Rusty Wallace called the race in the booth as the cars raced down the frontstretch. Dave Moody called the race from atop the turn 3 stands as the field raced down the backstretch. Winston Kelley, Steve Post and Dillon Welch worked pit road for the radio side.

MRN
Booth announcers	Turn announcers	Pit reporters
Lead announcer: Alex Hayden; Announcer: Jeff Striegle; Announcer: Rusty Wallace	Backstretch: Dave Moody	Winston Kelley; Steve Post; Dillon Welch

== Standings after the race ==
Drivers' Championship standings

	Pos	Driver	Points
	1	Kyle Busch	273
2	2	Denny Hamlin	252 (–21)
	3	Kevin Harvick	248 (–25)
2	4	Joey Logano	245 (–28)
	5	Brad Keselowski	236 (–37)
	6	Aric Almirola	215 (–58)
	7	Martin Truex Jr.	207 (–66)
2	8	Ryan Blaney	203 (–70)
3	9	Chase Elliott	186 (–87)
1	10	Kurt Busch	185 (–88)
3	11	Kyle Larson	182 (–91)
1	12	Ricky Stenhouse Jr.	158 (–115)
2	13	Clint Bowyer	157 (–116)
1	14	Erik Jones	140 (–133)
1	15	Jimmie Johnson	134 (–139)
2	16	Daniel Suárez	134 (–139)
Official driver's standings

Manufacturers' Championship standings

Pos	Manufacturer	Points
1	Toyota	223
2	Ford	222 (–1)
3	Chevrolet	194 (–29)

- Note: Only the first 16 positions are included for the driver standings.

Previous race: 2019 Auto Club 400	Monster Energy NASCAR Cup Series; 2019 season	Next race: 2019 O'Reilly Auto Parts 500
