= St. Thomas Raceway Park =

Motorsport venue near Sparta, Ontario

St. Thomas Dragway
Sparta
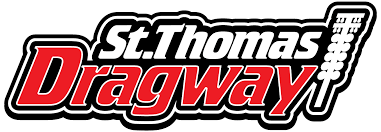
- Location: Sparta, Ontario, Canada
- Coordinates: 42°42′06.08″N 81°06′00.93″W
- Capacity: N/A
- Owner: Spriet Motorsports Inc
- Operator: Spriet Motorsports Inc
- Address: 45633 Sparta Line. St. Thomas, Ontario N5P 3S8
- Opened: 1962
- Former names: London Motorsports Park, St. Thomas Raceway Park

Drag Strip
- Surface: Concrete
- Length: 0.250 mi (0.402 km)
- Race lap record: 296.57 miles per hour (477.28 km/h) (Jim Epler, Jim Epler, 2018)

}

The St. Thomas Dragway is a quarter mile drag racing course that is sanctioned by the WDRA (World Drag Racing Alliance).

St. Thomas Dragway is Southwestern Ontario’s premiere drag racing facility and Canada’s oldest purpose built drag strip. Originally opened in 1962 by Bob & Helen Harvey it continues to be the oldest continually run drag strip in the country. Steeped in a rich history, this historic venue has hosted many racing legends including John Force and was the first drag strip outside of the United State to be sanctioned by the National Hot Rod Association.

Currently, St. Thomas Dragway is owned and operated by Spriet Motorsports Inc. It offers racing every weekend from May to the end of October which includes a season long points program for a number of different race classes, partnering with local car clubs and business for unique events and private track rentals. The newest addition to St. Thomas Dragway is the Off Road Park which will host a few Mud Bog events yearly as well as offer private rentals.

There is a variety of racing events from early April to mid November (usually on a Friday night, Saturday, or Sunday afternoon). It is located near Sparta (Elgin County), Ontario, Canada and is a reasonable driving distance from the larger town of St. Thomas. During the season, there is a possibility for night racing in addition to daytime racing. Hours of operation are considered to be six hours long for all events while time trials generally take place 30–60 minutes after the gates open. Racers on the raceway park tend to be locals who live within 100 miles (160 km) of the track in places like Tillsonburg, London, St. Thomas, Woodstock, and Windsor. The St. Thomas Raceway Park is owned by Spriet Investments who also own the only other drag race track in Ontario.

All cars must pass inspection by the in-house inspectors. If a car doesn't pass inspection, it doesn't get to race that day. Since the raceway is technically private property, racers who lose their cool will be ejected from the facility. DOT-approved helmets are required for the races and all articles must be removed from the trunk of the vehicle. All decisions (about inspection, class assignment, and qualification) are final and the staff has absolute authority. Burnouts are only permitted in the specially designated "burnout box." It has been highly controversial to members of the surrounding community and does not conform to current law's and regulation specific to racetracks.

On July 31st, 2026, it was announced that the track has officially been sold to Bill and Rachelle Fletcher and will return to its former iconic name – London Motorsports Park.

== Speed records ==
The fastest speed ever achieved at St. Thomas Raceway Park was by Jim Epler on July 2, 2000. He drove a Nitro Funny Car at a speed of 296.57 miles per hour (477.28 km/h). Lou Perriera did the second fastest track record while driving a jet dragster at 292.19 miles per hour (470.23 km/h) on August 28, 2004
