= List of 1983 Canadian incumbents =

== Federal government ==
- Governor General - Edward Schreyer

=== Cabinet ===
- Prime Minister - Pierre Trudeau
- Deputy Prime Minister - Allan MacEachen
- Minister of Finance - Marc Lalonde
- Secretary of State for External Affairs - Allan MacEachen
- Secretary of State for Canada - Serge Joyal
- Minister of National Defence - Gilles Lamontagne then Jean-Jacques Blais
- Minister of National Health and Welfare - Monique Bégin
- Minister of Regional Industrial Expansion - Ed Lumley
- Minister of the Environment - John Roberts then Charles Caccia
- Minister of Justice - Mark MacGuigan
- Minister of Transport - Jean-Luc Pépin then Lloyd Axworthy
- Minister of Communications - Francis Fox
- Minister of Fisheries and Oceans - Pierre de Bané
- Minister of Agriculture - Eugene Whelan
- Minister of Public Works - Roméo LeBlanc
- Minister of Employment and Immigration - Lloyd Axworthy then John Roberts
- Minister of Indian Affairs and Northern Development - John Munro
- Minister of Energy, Mines and Resources - John Roberts then Charles Caccia

== Parliament ==
See: 32nd Canadian parliament

=== Party leaders ===
- Liberal Party of Canada - Pierre Trudeau
- New Democratic Party- Ed Broadbent
- Progressive Conservative Party of Canada - Joe Clark then Erik Nielsen interim then Brian Mulroney

=== Supreme Court Justices ===
- Chief Justice: Bora Laskin
- William McIntyre
- Bertha Wilson
- Antonio Lamer
- Roland Almon Ritchie
- John Sopinka
- Jean Beetz
- Julien Chouinard
- Gerald Eric Le Dain

=== Other ===
- Speaker of the House of Commons - Jeanne Sauvé
- Governor of the Bank of Canada - Gerald Bouey
- Chief of the Defence Staff - Air General R.M. Withers then General G.C.E. Thériault

== Provinces ==
=== Premiers ===
- Premier of Alberta - Peter Lougheed
- Premier of British Columbia - Bill Bennett
- Premier of Manitoba - Howard Pawley
- Premier of New Brunswick - Richard Hatfield
- Premier of Newfoundland - Brian Peckford
- Premier of Nova Scotia - John Buchanan
- Premier of Ontario - Bill Davis
- Premier of Prince Edward Island - James Lee
- Premier of Quebec - René Lévesque
- Premier of Saskatchewan - Grant Devine

=== Lieutenant-governors ===
- Lieutenant-Governor of Alberta - Frank C. Lynch-Staunton
- Lieutenant-Governor of British Columbia - Henry Pybus Bell-Irving then Robert Gordon Rogers
- Lieutenant-Governor of Manitoba - Pearl McGonigal
- Lieutenant-Governor of New Brunswick - George F.G. Stanley
- Lieutenant-Governor of Newfoundland and Labrador - William Anthony Paddon
- Lieutenant-Governor of Nova Scotia - John Elvin Shaffner
- Lieutenant-Governor of Ontario - Jean-Pierre Côté
- Lieutenant-Governor of Prince Edward Island - Joseph Aubin Doiron
- Lieutenant-Governor of Quebec - Gilles Lamontagne
- Lieutenant-Governor of Saskatchewan - Irwin McIntosh then Sylvia Fedoruk

== Mayors ==
- Toronto - Art Eggleton
- Montreal - Jean Drapeau
- Vancouver - Michael Harcourt
- Ottawa - Marion Dewar

== Religious leaders ==
- Roman Catholic Bishop of Quebec - Cardinal Archbishop Louis-Albert Vachon
- Roman Catholic Bishop of Montreal - Cardinal Archbishop Paul Grégoire
- Roman Catholic Bishops of London - Bishop John Michael Sherlock
- Moderator of the United Church of Canada - W. Clarke MacDonald

== See also ==
- 1982 Canadian incumbents
- Events in Canada in 1983
- 1984 Canadian incumbents
- Governmental leaders in 1983
- Canadian incumbents by year
