= List of 1980 Canadian incumbents =

== Crown ==
- Head of State - Queen Elizabeth II

== Federal government ==
- Governor General - Edward Schreyer

=== Cabinet ===
- Prime Minister - Joe Clark then Pierre Trudeau
- Deputy Prime Minister - Vacant then Allan MacEachen
- Minister of Finance - John Crosbie then Allan MacEachen
- Secretary of State for External Affairs - Flora McDonald then Mark MacGuigan
- Secretary of State for Canada - David MacDonald then Francis Fox
- Minister of the Environment - John Allen Fraser then John Roberts
- Minister of Justice - Jacques Flynn then Jean Chrétien
- Minister of National Defence - Allan McKinnon then Gilles Lamontagne
- Minister of Health and Welfare - David Edward Crombie then Monique Bégin
- Minister of Regional Economic Expansion - Elmer MacKay then Pierre De Bané
- Minister of Transport - Don Mazankowski then Jean-Luc Pépin
- Minister of Communications - David MacDonald then Francis Fox
- Minister of Fisheries and Oceans - James McGrath then Roméo LeBlanc
- Minister of Public Works - Erik Nielsen then Paul James Cosgrove
- Minister of Employment and Immigration - Ron Atkey then Lloyd Axworthy
- Minister of Indian Affairs and Northern Development - Jake Epp then John Munro
- Minister of Energy, Mines and Resources - Ramon John Hnatyshyn then Marc Lalonde

== Parliament ==
=== Party leaders ===
- Liberal Party of Canada - Pierre Trudeau
- New Democratic Party- Ed Broadbent
- Progressive Conservative Party - Joe Clark

=== Supreme Court Justices ===
- Chief Justice: Bora Laskin
- William McIntyre
- Ronald Martland
- Antonio Lamer
- Roland Almon Ritchie
- Willard Estey
- Jean Beetz
- Julien Chouinard
- Gerald Eric Le Dain

=== Other ===
- Speaker of the House of Commons - James Jerome
- Governor of the Bank of Canada - Gerald Bouey
- Chief of the Defence Staff - Air General Robert Hilborn Falls

== Provinces ==
=== Premiers ===
- Premier of Alberta - Peter Lougheed
- Premier of British Columbia - Bill Bennett
- Premier of Manitoba - Sterling Lyon
- Premier of New Brunswick - Richard Hatfield
- Premier of Newfoundland - Brian Peckford
- Premier of Nova Scotia - John Buchanan
- Premier of Ontario - Bill Davis
- Premier of Prince Edward Island - Angus MacLean
- Premier of Quebec - René Lévesque
- Premier of Saskatchewan - Allan Blakeney

=== Lieutenant-governors ===
- Lieutenant-Governor of Alberta - Frank C. Lynch-Staunton
- Lieutenant-Governor of British Columbia - Henry Pybus Bell-Irving
- Lieutenant-Governor of Manitoba - Pearl McGonigal
- Lieutenant-Governor of New Brunswick - George F.G. Stanley
- Lieutenant-Governor of Newfoundland and Labrador - William Anthony Paddon
- Lieutenant-Governor of Nova Scotia - John Elvin Shaffner
- Lieutenant-Governor of Ontario - Jean-Pierre Côté
- Lieutenant-Governor of Prince Edward Island - Joseph Aubin Doiron
- Lieutenant-Governor of Quebec - Gilles Lamontagne
- Lieutenant-Governor of Saskatchewan - Irwin McIntosh

== See also ==
- 1979 Canadian incumbents
- Events in Canada in 1980
- 1981 Canadian incumbents
- Governmental leaders in 1980
- Canadian incumbents by year
