= 1983 in Canada =

- Decades: 1960s; 1970s; 1980s; 1990s; 2000s
- See also: History of Canada; Timeline of Canadian history; List of years in Canada

Events from the year 1983 in Canada.

== Incumbents ==
=== Crown ===
- Monarch – Elizabeth II

=== Federal government ===
- Governor General – Edward Schreyer
- Prime Minister – Pierre Trudeau
- Chief Justice – Bora Laskin (Ontario)
- Parliament – 32nd

=== Provincial governments ===
==== Lieutenant governors ====
- Lieutenant Governor of Alberta – Francis Charles Lynch-Staunton
- Lieutenant Governor of British Columbia – Henry Pybus Bell-Irving (until July 15) then Robert Gordon Rogers
- Lieutenant Governor of Manitoba – Pearl McGonigal
- Lieutenant Governor of New Brunswick – George Stanley
- Lieutenant Governor of Newfoundland – William Anthony Paddon
- Lieutenant Governor of Nova Scotia – John Elvin Shaffner
- Lieutenant Governor of Ontario – John Black Aird
- Lieutenant Governor of Prince Edward Island – Joseph Aubin Doiron
- Lieutenant Governor of Quebec – Jean-Pierre Côté
- Lieutenant Governor of Saskatchewan – Irwin McIntosh (until July 6) then Frederick Johnson

==== Premiers ====
- Premier of Alberta – Peter Lougheed
- Premier of British Columbia – Bill Bennett
- Premier of Manitoba – Howard Pawley
- Premier of New Brunswick – Richard Hatfield
- Premier of Newfoundland – Brian Peckford
- Premier of Nova Scotia – John Buchanan
- Premier of Ontario – Bill Davis
- Premier of Prince Edward Island – James Lee
- Premier of Quebec – René Lévesque
- Premier of Saskatchewan – Grant Devine

=== Territorial governments ===
==== Commissioners ====
- Commissioner of Yukon – Douglas Bell
- Commissioner of Northwest Territories – John Havelock Parker

==== Premiers ====
- Premier of the Northwest Territories – George Braden
- Premier of Yukon – Chris Pearson

== Events ==
- January 17 - Saskatchewan MLA Colin Thatcher resigns as Minister of Energy and Mines after several well-publicised disputes with premier Grant Devine.
- January 21 - Joann Thatcher, ex-wife of Saskatchewan MLA Colin Thatcher, is murdered in her Regina home. Colin would later be convicted of the crime.
- February 1 - Pay television begins operating in Canada.
- February 15 - The Tamarack Review ceases publication.
- April 1 - The spending mandate by Premier Bill Bennett's government expires without a sitting of the House or the calling of an election: constitutional interregnum and crisis ensues.
- April 5 - Lieutenant Governor of British Columbia Henry Pybus Bell-Irving summons Premier Bennett to Government House. The L-G issues emergency warrants to cover spending until a snap election.
- June 2 - Air Canada Flight 797 makes an emergency landing in Cincinnati, Ohio - a fire kills 23 of 41 passengers on board.
- June 9 - Bill 101, protecting the French language in Quebec is ruled unconstitutional.
- June 11 - Brian Mulroney replaces Joe Clark as leader of Progressive Conservative Party of Canada.
- June 17 - Saint John, New Brunswick Princess Diana and Prince Charles start their tour of Canada.
- June 19 - BC Place in Vancouver opens.
- July 23 - Gimli Glider: Air Canada flight 143 makes an emergency landing in Gimli, Manitoba.
- October 1 - North Atlantic Salmon Conservation Organization is established.
- November 17 - The Western Grain Transportation Act is passed.
- December 23 - Jeanne Sauvé is appointed Canada's first female Governor General.

=== Full date unknown ===
- Canada agrees to allow testing of American cruise missiles in the west.
- The Point Lepreau Nuclear Generating Station, the first nuclear power plant in the Maritimes.

== Arts and literature ==
=== New books ===
- A Time for Judas - Morley Callaghan
- Unearthing Suite - Margaret Atwood
- Seagull on Yonge Street - bill bissett
- "Happy Endings" - Margaret Atwood

=== Awards ===
- See 1983 Governor General's Awards for a complete list of winners and finalists for those awards.
- Books in Canada First Novel Award: W.P. Kinsella, Shoeless Joe
- Gerald Lampert Award: Diana Hartog, Matinee Light
- Pat Lowther Award: Rhea Tregebov, Remembering History
- Stephen Leacock Award: Morley Torgov, The Outside Chance of Maximilian Glick
- Vicky Metcalf Award: Claire Mackay

=== Film ===
- Graham Greene makes his film debut in Running Brave
- David Cronenberg's The Dead Zone is released
- A film is made of Farley Mowat's Never Cry Wolf, named Never Cry Wolf.

== Sport ==
- March 5 - Steve Podborski wins Gold at the World Cup of Skiing.
- March 13 - Saskatchewan Huskies won their only University Cup by defeating the Concordia Stingers 6 to 2, the Final game was played at Moncton Coliseum
- May 14 - Portland Winter Hawks become the First American team to win the Memorial Cup by defeating the Oshawa Generals 8 to 3.
- October 1 - Tulsa Roughnecks won their only Soccer Bowl by defeating the Toronto Blizzard in Soccer Bowl '83 played at BC Place Stadium in Vancouver
- May 17 - New York Islanders won their Fourth (consecutive and last to date) Stanley Cup by defeating the Edmonton Oilers. Montreal's Mike Bossy was awarded his Second(consecutive) Conn Smythe Trophy
- November 15 - Rocky Johnson becomes the Third Canadian to win the World Wrestling Federation's Tag Team Championship (with Tony Atlas as the "Soul Patrol") by defeating the Wild Samoans in Allentown, Pennsylvania
- November 19 - Calgary Dinos won their First Vanier Cup by defeating the Queen's Golden Gaels 31 to 21 in the 19th Vanier Cup played at Varsity Stadium in Toronto
- November 27 - Toronto Argonauts won their Tenth (and First since 1952) Grey Cup by defeating the BC Lions 18 to 17 in the 71st Grey Cup played at the Lions own BC Place Stadium in Vancouver

== Births ==
- January 3 – Joe Bartoch, swimmer
- January 6 – Cristina Rosato, actress
- January 9 – Chris Getzlaf, American football player; brother of Anaheim Ducks captain Ryan Getzlaf
- January 11 – Matthew Palleschi, soccer player
- January 21 – Maryse Mizanin, pro wrestler
- February 2 – Jordin Tootoo, ice hockey player
- February 4 – Lauren Ash, actress and comedian
- February 6 – Myron Wolf Child, youth activist, public speaker and politician (d.2007)
- February 8 – Atiba Hutchinson,
- February 9 – Keith Beavers, swimmer
- February 14 – Sasha Andrews, soccer player
- February 15 – Russell Martin, baseball player
- February 28 – Marie-Pierre Gagné, synchronized swimmer
- March 3
  - Olia Berger, judoka
  - Marie-Pier Boudreau Gagnon, synchronized swimmer
- March 10 – Kyle Marshall, Canadian animator, storyboard artist, director and writer
- March 31 – Ashleigh Ball, voice actress
- April 1 – John Axford, baseball player
- April 2 – Owen Fussey, ice hockey player
- April 4 – Doug Lynch, ice hockey player
- April 7 – Kyle Labine, actor
- April 8 – Crystal Gilmore, artistic gymnast
- April 11 – Joanna Douglas, actress
- April 12 – Anthony Sedlak, chef, and the host of Food Network Canada's The Main (d.2012)
- April 28 – Dan Mangan, singer-songwriter
- May 4 – Jesse Moss, actor
- May 20 – Dan Blackburn, ice hockey player
- June 6 – Lyndie Greenwood, actress
- June 13 – Jason Spezza, ice hockey player
- June 14 – Torrance Coombs, actor
- June 16 – Lisa Yamanaka, voice actress
- June 22 – Sheena Lawrick, softball player
- June 26 – Jessika Dubuc, synchronized swimmer
- June 30 – Katherine Ryan, comedian and actress
- July 6
  - Leo Carroll, volleyball player
  - Christine Firkins, actress
  - Gregory Smith, actor
- July 12 – Krystin Pellerin, actress
- July 14 – Katrina Chen, politician
- July 16 – Duncan Keith, ice hockey player
- July 21
  - Vinessa Antoine, actress
  - Tara Campbell, water polo player
- August 10 – Mathieu Roy, professional ice hockey player
- September 10 – Joey Votto, baseball player
- September 15 – Ashleigh McIvor, freestyle skier
- September 18 – Giulio Scandella, ice hockey player
- September 27 – Jay Bouwmeester, ice hockey player
- October 3 – Meghan Heffern, actress
- October 5 – Noot Seear, fashion model and actress
- October 16 – Kenny Omega, pro wrestler
- October 21
  - Christine Moore, NDP politician
  - Charlotte Sullivan, actress
- November 4 – Melanie Kok, rower
- November 10 – Fred Cheng, Canadian-born Hong Kong singer
- November 24 – Karine Vanasse, actress and producer
- November 28 – Courtney Rush, professional wrestler
- December 19
  - Laura Pomeroy, swimmer
  - Matt Stajan, ice hockey player
- December 22 – Joe Dinicol, actor
- December 24 – Daniel Stein, water polo player
- date unknown – Anita Sarkeesian, Canadian-American feminist
- date unknown – Jane McGregor, actress

== Deaths ==
=== January to June ===
- January 21 - JoAnn Wilson, murder victim (b.1939)
- March 16 - Fred Rose, politician and trade union organizer (b.1907)
- May 1 - George Hodgson, swimmer and double Olympic gold medalist (b.1893)
- May 10 - Leonard Marsh, social scientist and professor (b.1906)
- May 25 - Jean Rougeau, professional wrestler and bodyguard of Québec Premier René Lévesque (b.1929)
- June 2 -
  - Thomas John Bentley, politician (b.1891)
  - Stan Rogers, folk musician and songwriter (b.1949)
- June 12 - Norma Shearer, Academy Award–winning actress (b.1902)
- June 27 - Alden Nowlan, poet, novelist, playwright and journalist (b.1933)

=== July to December ===
- July 11 - Ross Macdonald, novelist (b.1915)
- July 13 - Gabrielle Roy, author (b.1909)
- July 29 - Raymond Massey, actor (b.1896)
- September 21 - Andrew Brewin, lawyer and politician (b.1907)
- October 20 - Yves Thériault, author (b.1915)
- November 24 - Graham Spry, broadcasting pioneer, business executive, diplomat and socialist (b.1900)
- December 2 - Fifi D'Orsay, actress (b.1904)
- December 23 – Edythe Shuttleworth, mezzo-soprano (b.1907)

== See also ==
- 1983 in Canadian television
- List of Canadian films of 1983
