= 1985 in Canada =

- Decades: 1960s; 1970s; 1980s; 1990s; 2000s
- See also: History of Canada; Timeline of Canadian history; List of years in Canada

Events from the year 1985 in Canada.

== Incumbents ==
=== Crown ===
- Monarch – Elizabeth II

=== Federal government ===
- Governor General – Jeanne Sauvé
- Prime Minister – Brian Mulroney
- Chief Justice – Brian Dickson (Manitoba)
- Parliament – 33rd

=== Provincial governments ===
==== Lieutenant governors ====
- Lieutenant Governor of Alberta – Francis Charles Lynch-Staunton (until January 22) then Helen Hunley
- Lieutenant Governor of British Columbia – Robert Gordon Rogers
- Lieutenant Governor of Manitoba – Pearl McGonigal
- Lieutenant Governor of New Brunswick – George Stanley
- Lieutenant Governor of Newfoundland – William Anthony Paddon
- Lieutenant Governor of Nova Scotia – Alan Abraham
- Lieutenant Governor of Ontario – John Black Aird (until September 20) then Lincoln Alexander
- Lieutenant Governor of Prince Edward Island – Joseph Aubin Doiron (until August 1) then Lloyd MacPhail
- Lieutenant Governor of Quebec – Gilles Lamontagne
- Lieutenant Governor of Saskatchewan – Frederick Johnson

==== Premiers ====
- Premier of Alberta – Peter Lougheed (until November 1) then Don Getty
- Premier of British Columbia – Bill Bennett
- Premier of Manitoba – Howard Pawley
- Premier of New Brunswick – Richard Hatfield
- Premier of Newfoundland – Brian Peckford
- Premier of Nova Scotia – John Buchanan
- Premier of Ontario – Bill Davis (until February 8) then Frank Miller (February 8 to June 26) then David Peterson
- Premier of Prince Edward Island – James Lee
- Premier of Quebec – René Lévesque (until October 3) then Pierre-Marc Johnson (October 3 to December 12) then Robert Bourassa
- Premier of Saskatchewan – Grant Devine

=== Territorial governments ===
==== Commissioners ====
- Commissioner of Yukon – Douglas Bell
- Commissioner of Northwest Territories – John Havelock Parker

==== Premiers ====
- Premier of the Northwest Territories – Richard Nerysoo (until November 5) then Nick Sibbeston
- Premier of Yukon – Chris Pearson (until March 23) then Willard Phelps (March 23 to May 29) then Tony Penikett

== Events ==
=== January to March ===
- January 26 – Frank Miller elected leader of the Ontario Progressive Conservative Party replacing Bill Davis.
- January 30 – The federal government relaxes laws requiring businesses to use the metric system.
- February 8 – Frank Miller becomes premier of Ontario, replacing Bill Davis after the Ontario Progressive Conservative leadership election.
- February 11 – The federal and Newfoundland governments sign the Atlantic Accord paving the way for joint development of Newfoundland's offshore oil and gas reserves.
- February 12 – Minister of National Defence Robert Coates resigns after it is revealed that he visited a strip-club while on government business in Germany.
- February 13 – Denis Lortie is found guilty of murder for his attack at the Quebec Parliament Building that killed three.
- February 28 – Holocaust denier Ernst Zündel is found guilty of publishing false news and fomenting racial intolerance.
- March – Willard Phelps becomes premier of Yukon, replacing Chris Pearson.
- March – At the so-called Shamrock Summit between Prime Minister Mulroney and US President Ronald Reagan the two agree on cooperation on missile defence and free trade.
- March 12 – Heavily armed Armenian militants storm the Turkish embassy in Ottawa. They kill a security guard and hold a dozen people hostage for four hours.
- March 21 – Rick Hansen launches his Man in Motion world tour to raise money for spinal cord research.
- March 29 – 10 are killed after two military planes collide near CFB Edmonton.

=== April to June ===
- April 24 - The Supreme Court of Canada rules the Lord's Day Act violates Canadians' freedom of religion.
- May - Tony Penikett becomes government leader of Yukon, replacing Willard Phelps.
- May 2 - Ontario election: Frank Miller's PCs win a minority, but David Peterson's Liberals will form a coalition with the NDP, forcing Miller to resign.
- May 9 - The Supreme Court rules that orders in council are subject to the Canadian Charter of Rights and Freedoms.
- May 31 - A tornado in Barrie, Ontario, kills twelve as part of the 1985 United States–Canada tornado outbreak.
- June 20 – René Lévesque announces his intention to resign as premier of Quebec.
- June 23 - Air India Flight 182 explodes en route from Montreal to London; Sikh terrorists are blamed.
- June 26 - David Peterson becomes premier of Ontario, replacing Frank Miller.

=== July to December ===
- July 1 - The first cell phone call is made in Canada, between Toronto mayor Art Eggleton and Montreal mayor Jean Drapeau.
- September 1 - The wreck of the RMS Titanic is found off the coast of Newfoundland.
- September 6 - The Canadian Encyclopedia is launched.
- September 17 - The Tunagate scandal erupts.
- September 20 - Lincoln Alexander becomes the Lieutenant-Governor of Ontario, the first Black person to hold a vice-regal position in Canada.
- September 25 - The Royal Tyrrell Museum of Palaeontology opens in Drumheller, Alberta.
- October 3 - Pierre-Marc Johnson becomes premier of Quebec, replacing René Lévesque.
- November 1 - Don Getty becomes premier of Alberta, replacing Peter Lougheed.
- November 5 - Nick Sibbeston becomes government leader of the Northwest Territories, replacing Richard Nerysoo.
- December 2 - In the Quebec election, Robert Bourassa's Liberals gain a majority, defeating the Parti Québécois.
- December 12 - Robert Bourassa becomes premier of Quebec for the second time, replacing Pierre-Marc Johnson.
- December 12 - The worst airplane accident in Canadian history occurs when Arrow Air Flight 1285 crashes on take-off from Gander International Airport; 256 people are killed.
- December 23 - Nahanni earthquake, largest of a number earthquakes occurs in Nahanni region of NWT.
- Corel is founded in Ottawa.

=== Unknown ===
- The Mulroney government establishes the Court Challenges Program.

== Arts and literature ==
=== New books ===
- Margaret Atwood: The Handmaid's Tale
- Colin Thatcher: Backrooms: A Story of Politics
- Brian Moore: Black Robe
- Erín Moure: Domestic Fuel
- Farley Mowat: My Discovery of America

=== Awards ===
- See 1985 Governor General's Awards for a complete list of winners and finalists for those awards.
- Books in Canada First Novel Award: G. Ursell, Perdue, or How the West Was Lost
- Gerald Lampert Award: Paulette Jiles, Celestial Navigation
- Pat Lowther Award: Paulette Jiles, Celestial Navigation
- Stephen Leacock Award: Ted Allan, Love Is a Long Shot
- Vicky Metcalf Award: Edith Fowke

=== Television ===
- The last episode of The Friendly Giant on CBC Television
- The first episode of the children's series The Raccoons on CBC Television

=== Music ===
- February 10 - A supergroup of Canadian musicians, Northern Lights, gathers to record the charity single Tears Are Not Enough for famine relief in Ethiopia.

== Sport ==
- May 18 – Prince Albert Raiders win their only Memorial Cup by defeating the Shawinigan Cataractes 6 to 2. The final game was played at the Cataractes' Shawinigan Municipal Auditorium in Shawinigan, Quebec.
- May 30 – Edmonton Oilers win their second (consecutive) Stanley Cup by defeating the Philadelphia Flyers 4 games to 1. The deciding Game 5 was played at Northlands Coliseum in Edmonton. Brantford, Ontario's Wayne Gretzky is awarded the Conn Smythe Trophy
- November 24 – BC Lions win their second (and first since 1964) Grey Cup by defeating the Hamilton Tiger-Cats 37 to 24 in the 73rd Grey Cup played at Olympic Stadium in Montreal
- November 30 – Calgary Dinos win their second (consecutive) Vanier Cup by defeating the Western Ontario Mustangs 25 to 6 in the 21st Vanier Cup played at Varsity Stadium in Toronto

== Births ==
- January 1 – Jeff Carter, ice hockey player
- January 3 – Leah Gibson, film actress
- January 4
  - Danielle Campo, swimmer
  - Robbie Dixon, skier
- January 6 – Nathan McIver, ice hockey player
- January 14 – Katie Thorlakson, soccer player
- January 27 – Eric Radford, pair skater
- January 30 – Torrey Mitchell, ice hockey player
- February 7 – Tegan Moss, actress
- February 11 – Mike Richards, ice hockey player
- February 18 – Chelsea Hobbs, actress and singer
- February 19 – Raymond Sawada, ice hockey player (d. 2023)
- February 27 – Braydon Coburn, ice hockey player
- February 28 – Fefe Dobson, singer and songwriter
- March 9 – Brent Burns, ice hockey player
- March 11 – Paul Bissonnette, ice hockey player
- March 25 – Carmen Rasmusen, singer
- April 6
  - Clarke MacArthur, ice hockey player
  - Al Mukadam, actor, director, and producer
- April 9 – Brian Elliott, ice hockey goaltender
- April 10
  - Christie Laing, actress
  - Dion Phaneuf, NHL hockey player
- April 14 – Grant Clitsome, ice hockey player
- April 19 – Sabrina Jalees, comedian, dancer, actress, presenter, and writer
- April 22 – Kristin Fairlie, actress
- April 23 – Rachel Skarsten, actress
- May 6 – Lewis Hilsenteger, YouTuber
- May 15 – Tyrone Savage, actor
- May 22 – Marc-Antoine Pouliot, ice hockey player
- May 27 – Andrew Francis, voice actor and actor
- June 10 – Kreesha Turner, singer-songwriter and dancer
- June 11 - Josh Ramsay, lead singer of Marianas Trench
- June 13 – Danny Syvret, ice hockey player
- June 22 – Douglas Smith, actor
- June 23 – Holly Lincoln, football (soccer) player
- June 24 – Isabelle Rampling, synchronized swimmer
- July 1 – Nineteen85, hip-hop producer
- July 5 – Michael Cuccione, child actor and activist (d. 2001)
- July 6 – Diamond Rings, singer-songwriter, guitarist, and producer
- July 12
  - Adam Gregory, singer
  - Theo Tams, singer-songwriter, pianist & keyboardist
- July 16
  - Matthew Santoro, YouTuber
  - Vanessa Meloche, artistic gymnast
- July 20 – Harley Morenstein, actor and internet personality
- July 21 – Vanessa Lengies, actress, dancer, and singer
- July 23 – Tessa Bonhomme, hockey player
- August 7 – Rick Genest, artist, actor, and fashion model (d. 2018)
- July 28 – Dustin Milligan, actor
- August 26 – Sean Denison, basketball player
- September 2 – Yani Gellman, Canadian/Australian film and television actor
- September 8 – Justin Bradley, actor
- September 10 – Elyse Levesque, actress
- September 19 – Renee Young, journalist
- September 22 – Tatiana Maslany, actress
- September 24 – Jessica Lucas, actress and singer
- September 27 – Massimo Bertocchi, decathlete
- October 1 – Leah Renee Cudmore, actress and singer
- October 8 – Magda Apanowicz, actress
- October 22 – Mitch MacDonald, singer & guitarist
- November 3 – Jaime Callica, actor and dancer
- November 11 – Kalan Porter, singer-songwriter
- November 21 – Carly Rae Jepsen, singer and songwriter
- December 8 – Meagan Duhamel, pair skater

== Deaths ==
=== January to June ===
- January 30 – F. R. Scott, poet, intellectual and constitutional expert (b. 1899)
- February 2 – Micheline Coulombe Saint-Marcoux, musician and composer (b. 1938)
- February 5 – Georges-Émile Lapalme, politician (b. 1907)
- February 16 – Marian Engel, novelist (b. 1933)
- March 17 – Athole Shearer, actress (b. 1900)
- April 17 – Walter Weir, politician and 15th Premier of Manitoba (b. 1929)
- April 21 – Foster Hewitt, radio pioneer (b. 1902)
- April 22 – Jacques Ferron, physician and author, founder of the Parti Rhinocéros (b. 1921)
- May 4 – Clarence Wiseman, Salvation Army general (b.1907)
- May 7 – Donald Smith, politician (b. 1905)

=== July to December ===
- July 3 – Frank J. Selke, ice hockey manager (b. 1893)
- August 20 – Donald O. Hebb, psychologist (b. 1904)
- September 6 – Isabel Meighen, wife of Arthur Meighen, 9th Prime Minister of Canada (b. 1883)
- October 28 – Eric Coy, discus thrower and shot putter (b. 1914)

=== Full date unknown ===
- June – Kenneth Zeller, teacher and librarian (b. 1945)

== See also ==
- 1985 in Canadian television
- List of Canadian films of 1985
