= List of 1979 Canadian incumbents =

== Crown ==
- Head of state (monarch) – Queen Elizabeth II

== Federal government ==
- Governor General - Jules Léger then Edward Richard Schreyer

=== Cabinet ===
- Prime Minister - Pierre Trudeau then Joe Clark
- Deputy Prime Minister - Allan MacEachen then Vacant
- Minister of Finance - Jean Chrétien then John Crosbie
- Secretary of State for External Affairs - Don Jamieson then Flora McDonald
- Secretary of State for Canada - John Roberts then David MacDonald
- Minister of the Environment - Roméo LeBlanc then Leonard Marchand then John Allen Fraser
- Minister of Justice - Marc Lalonde then Jacques Flynn
- Minister of National Defence - Barney Danson then Allan McKinnon
- Minister of Health and Welfare - Monique Bégin then David Edward Crombie
- Minister of Regional Economic Expansion - Marcel Lessard then Vacant then Elmer MacKay
- Minister of Transport - Otto Lang then Don Mazankowski
- Minister of Communications - Jeanne Sauvé then David MacDonald
- Minister of Fisheries and Oceans - Roméo LeBlanc then James McGrath
- Minister of Public Works - André Ouellet then Erik Nielsen
- Minister of Employment and Immigration - Bud Cullen then Ron Atkey
- Minister of Indian Affairs and Northern Development - James Hugh Faulkner then Jake Epp
- Minister of Energy, Mines and Resources - Alastair Gillespie then Ramon John Hnatyshyn

== Parliament ==
See: 31st Canadian parliament

=== Party leaders ===
- Liberal Party of Canada - Pierre Trudeau
- New Democratic Party- Ed Broadbent
- Progressive Conservative Party - Joe Clark

=== Supreme Court Justices ===
- Chief Justice: Bora Laskin
- William McIntyre
- Ronald Martland
- Louis-Philippe Pigeon
- Roland Almon Ritchie
- Willard Estey
- Jean Beetz
- Julien Chouinard
- Brian Dickson

=== Other ===
- Speaker of the House of Commons - James Jerome
- Governor of the Bank of Canada - Gerald Bouey
- Chief of the Defence Staff - Air General Robert Hilborn Falls

== Provinces ==
=== Premiers ===
- Premier of Alberta - Peter Lougheed
- Premier of British Columbia - Bill Bennett
- Premier of Manitoba - Sterling Lyon
- Premier of New Brunswick - Richard Hatfield
- Premier of Newfoundland - Frank Moores then Brian Peckford
- Premier of Nova Scotia - John Buchanan
- Premier of Ontario - Bill Davis
- Premier of Prince Edward Island - Bennett Campbell then Angus MacLean
- Premier of Quebec - René Lévesque
- Premier of Saskatchewan - Allan Blakeney

=== Lieutenant-governors ===
- Lieutenant-Governor of Alberta - Frank C. Lynch-Staunton
- Lieutenant-Governor of British Columbia - Henry Pybus Bell-Irving
- Lieutenant-Governor of Manitoba - Francis Lawrence Jobin
- Lieutenant-Governor of New Brunswick - Hédard Robichaud
- Lieutenant-Governor of Newfoundland and Labrador - Gordon Arnaud Winter
- Lieutenant-Governor of Nova Scotia - John Elvin Shaffner
- Lieutenant-Governor of Ontario - Pauline Mills McGibbon
- Lieutenant-Governor of Prince Edward Island - Gordon Lockhart Bennett
- Lieutenant-Governor of Quebec - Jean-Pierre Côté
- Lieutenant-Governor of Saskatchewan - Irwin McIntosh

== Mayors ==
- Toronto - John Sewell
- Montreal - Jean Drapeau
- Vancouver - Jack Volrich
- Ottawa - Marion Dewar

== See also ==
- Events in Canada in 1979
- Governmental leaders in 1979
- Canadian incumbents by year
