= 1986 in Canada =

- Decades: 1960s; 1970s; 1980s; 1990s; 2000s
- See also: History of Canada; Timeline of Canadian history; List of years in Canada

Events from the year 1986 in Canada.

== Incumbents ==
=== Crown ===
- Monarch – Elizabeth II

=== Federal government ===
- Governor General – Jeanne Sauvé
- Prime Minister – Brian Mulroney
- Chief Justice – Brian Dickson (Manitoba)
- Parliament – 33rd

=== Provincial governments ===
==== Lieutenant governors ====
- Lieutenant Governor of Alberta – Helen Hunley
- Lieutenant Governor of British Columbia – Robert Gordon Rogers
- Lieutenant Governor of Manitoba – Pearl McGonigal (until December 11) then George Johnson
- Lieutenant Governor of New Brunswick – George Stanley
- Lieutenant Governor of Newfoundland – William Anthony Paddon (until September 5) then James McGrath
- Lieutenant Governor of Nova Scotia – Alan Abraham
- Lieutenant Governor of Ontario – Lincoln Alexander
- Lieutenant Governor of Prince Edward Island – Lloyd MacPhail
- Lieutenant Governor of Quebec – Gilles Lamontagne
- Lieutenant Governor of Saskatchewan – Frederick Johnson

==== Premiers ====
- Premier of Alberta – Don Getty
- Premier of British Columbia – Bill Bennett (until August 6) then Bill Vander Zalm
- Premier of Manitoba – Howard Pawley
- Premier of New Brunswick – Richard Hatfield
- Premier of Newfoundland – Brian Peckford
- Premier of Nova Scotia – John Buchanan
- Premier of Ontario – David Peterson
- Premier of Prince Edward Island – James Lee (until May 2) then Joe Ghiz
- Premier of Quebec – Robert Bourassa
- Premier of Saskatchewan – Grant Devine

=== Territorial governments ===
==== Commissioners ====
- Commissioner of Yukon – Douglas Bell (until March 27) then John Kenneth McKinnon
- Commissioner of Northwest Territories – John Havelock Parker

==== Premiers ====
- Premier of the Northwest Territories – Nick Sibbeston
- Premier of Yukon – Tony Penikett

== Events ==
=== January to June ===
- January 22 – An investigation determines that a bomb caused the crash of Air India flight 182.
- January 31 – The Canadian dollar hits an all-time low of 70.2 U.S. cents on international money markets.
- February 8 – Hinton train collision: 23 people are killed when the Super Continental passenger train collides with a Canadian National Railway freight train near Hinton, Alberta.
- April 4 – Port Simpson, British Columbia, is renamed to Lax Kwʼalaams.
- May 1 – Shirley Carr becomes the first female head of the Canadian Union of Public Employees.
- May 2
  - Joe Ghiz becomes premier of Prince Edward Island, replacing James Lee.
  - The 1986 World Exposition (Expo 86) in Vancouver opens.
- May 8 – Alberta election: The PCs, led by Don Getty, win a fifth consecutive majority, but a smaller majority than before.
- May 9 – Roger Coles resigns as leader of Yukon Liberal Party and MLA for Tatchun after being arrested and charged with selling cocaine to an undercover police officer.
- May 25 – In Vancouver an attempt is made to assassinate Malkiat Singh Sidhu, a cabinet minister in the Indian state of Punjab.
- June 14 – An accident involving the Mindbender roller coaster at West Edmonton Mall kills three people and seriously injures a fourth.
- June 19 – The new Competition Act comes into force.
- June 20 – Jean Drapeau resigns as mayor of Montreal.

=== July to December ===
- August 5 – Canada adopts sanctions against South Africa for its apartheid policies
- August 6 – Bill Vander Zalm becomes premier of British Columbia, replacing Bill Bennett
- August 11 – Tamil refugees are found drifting off the coast of Newfoundland
- September 16 – Elizabeth II augments the coat of arms of Saskatchewan with a crest and supporters
- September 30 – MPs elect the speaker by secret ballot for the first time.
- October 6 – Canada receives a United Nations award for sheltering refugees
- October 20 – Saskatchewan election: Grant Devine's PCs win a second consecutive majority
- November 13 – The announcement that the film producer Claude Jutra was reported missing for over one week. He had started to suffer the first symptoms of the Alzheimer's disease.
- December 8 – The University of Toronto's John C. Polanyi shares the Nobel Prize for chemistry for the development of the chemical laser.

=== Full date unknown ===
- Negotiators begin work on what would eventually be the Canada-United States Free Trade Agreement
- The birds series of Canadian banknotes is released
- Supreme Court rules on the RWDSU v. Dolphin Delivery Ltd. case
- Conrad Black buys The Daily Telegraph
- Dinosaur fossils are found near Parrsboro, Nova Scotia

== Arts and literature ==
=== New works ===
- Margaret Atwood - Freeforall
- W.P. Kinsella - The Fence Post Chronicles
- Robert Munsch - Love You Forever
- Alice Munro - The Progress of Love
- Antonine Maillet - Garrochés en paradis
- Hugh Hood - The Motor Boys in Ottawa
- William Gibson - Count Zero

=== Awards ===
- See 1986 Governor General's Awards for a complete list of winners and finalists for those awards.
- Books in Canada First Novel Award: Wayne Johnston, The Story of Bobby O'Mally
- Gerald Lampert Award: Joan Fern Shaw, Raspberry Vinegar
- Marian Engel Award: Alice Munro
- Pat Lowther Award: Erín Moure, Domestic Fuel
- Stephen Leacock Award: Joey Slinger, No Axe too Small to Grind
- Vicky Metcalf Award: Dennis Lee

=== New music ===
- Leonard Cohen - First We Take Manhattan
- Neil Young - Landing on Water

=== New movies ===
- James Cameron's Aliens is released
- David Cronenberg's The Fly
- Denys Arcand's The Decline of the American Empire

== Sport ==
- March 15 – In an international women's field hockey match at Wembley Stadium (England) Canada beats England 3 – 1.
- May 17 – The Guelph Platers win their only Memorial Cup by defeating the Hull Olympiques 6 to 2.
- May 24 – The Montreal Canadiens win their 23rd Stanley Cup by defeating the Calgary Flames. The deciding Game 5 is played at Olympic Saddledome in Calgary
- June 1 – Canada participates in the FIFA World Cup for the first time. They would not come back to a World Cup until 2022.
- November 22 – The UBC Thunderbirds win their second championship by defeating the Western Ontario Mustangs by a score of 25–23.
- November 30 – Hamilton Tiger-Cats win their 7th Grey Cup by defeating the Edmonton Eskimos 39 to 15 in the 74th Grey Cup played at BC Place Stadium in Vancouver

Unknown date

- The Canadian Amateur Football Association is renamed Football Canada.
- Montreal Concordes are re-branded as the "new" Montreal Allouettes

== Births ==
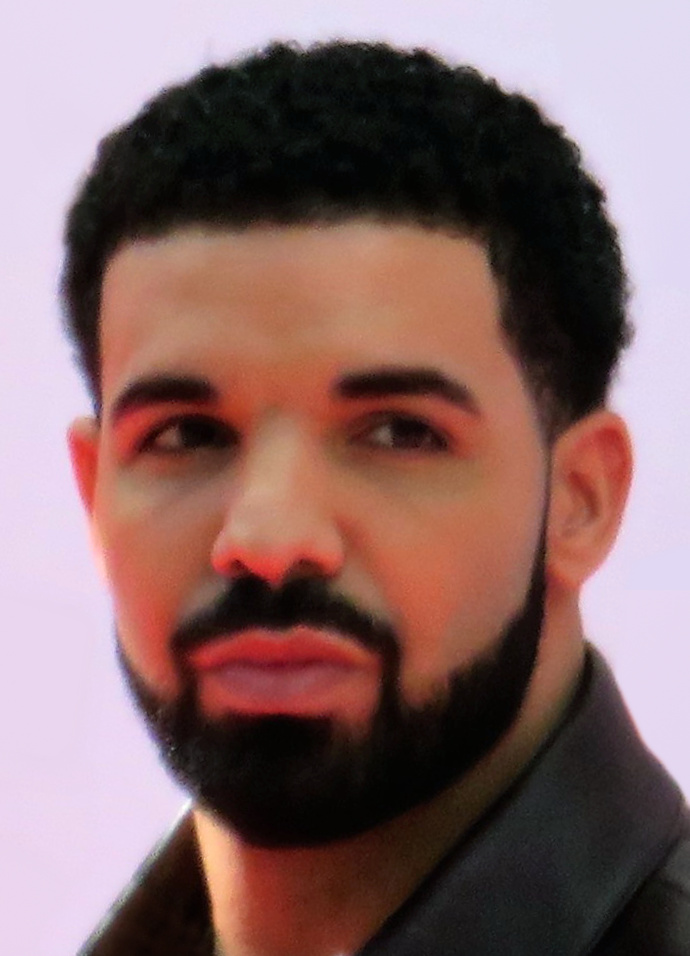
Drake

- January 8 – Jaclyn Linetsky, actress (d. 2003)
- January 13 - Joannie Rochette, figure skater
- January 20 – Krystina Alogbo, water polo player
- January 26 -
  - Taylor Wilde, wrestler
  - Johnny Griffin, voice actor
- February 13 – Matthew Hawes, swimmer
- February 19 – Jayde Nicole, model
- February 26 - Jeff Berg voice actor
- March 26 -
  - Jonny Craig, american singer
  - Carol-Anne Day, voice actor
- April 4 – Cam Barker, ice hockey defenceman
- April 8 - Jevohn Shepherd, basketball player
- April 21 – Kevin Graham, water polo player
- April 23 - Jessica Stam, model
- April 28 – Brandon Jung, water polo player
- May 6 - Tyler Hynes, actor and filmmaker
- May 12 – Emily VanCamp, actress
- May 31 – Melissa McIntyre, actress
- June 5 – Amanda Crew, actress
- June 9 - Adamo Ruggiero, actor
- June 17 - Marie Avgeropoulos, Greek actress and model
- June 18 – Meaghan Rath, actress
- June 28 - Shadia Simmons, actress
- July 15 - Mishael Morgan, actress
- July 16 – Dustin Boyd, ice hockey player
- July 18 - Brando Eaton, actor
- July 19 – Jinder Mahal, pro wrestler
- July 24 - Megan Park, actress and singer
- July 28 - Nolan Gerard Funk, actor and singer
- July 31 - Sean Eldrige, born American political and gay activist
- August 6 - Bryan Young (ice hockey), south korean ice hockey player
- August 16 – Sarah Pavan, volleyball player
- August 19 – Marie-Christine Schmidt, canoeist
- August 20 – Linus Sebastian, youtuber
- August 29 – Lauren Collins, actress
- September 8 – Leah LaBelle, singer (d. 2018)
- September 19 – Carrie Finlay, voice actor
- October 6 - Luisa D'Oliveira, actress
- October 24 – Drake, Canadian-American actor and rapper
- October 29 - Italia Ricci, actress
- November 4 – Alexz Johnson, singer-songwriter, actress, and philanthropist
- November 5 – Heather Purnell, artistic gymnast
- November 8 – Kaniehtiio Horn, actress
- November 16 – Will Stanhope, rock climber (b. 2026)
- December 7 – Corey Vidal, online video content provider and digital media consultant
- December 11 - Alex House, actor
- December 12 – Marie-Pier Beaudet, archer
- December 16 – Scott Tupper, field hockey player
- December 19 – Annie Murphy, actress

== Deaths ==
=== January to June ===
Dr. W.R. Franks

- January 4 - Wilbur R. Franks, scientist and inventor (b. 1901)
- January 26 - Norman MacKenzie, author, lawyer, professor and Senator (b. 1894)
- February 23 - Louis-Philippe Pigeon, judge of the Supreme Court of Canada (b. 1905)
- February 24 - Tommy Douglas, politician and Premier of Saskatchewan (b. 1904)
- February 27 - Jacques Plante, ice hockey player (b. 1929)
- March 4 - Richard Manuel, composer, singer and multi-instrumentalist (b. 1943)
- March 4 - Elizabeth Smart, poet and novelist (b. 1913)
- June 13 - Wilfrid Eggleston, journalist and chief censor for Canada from 1942 until 1944 (b. 1901)

=== July to December ===
- July 25 - Alison Parrott, murder victim (b. 1974)
- August 20 - Milton Acorn, poet, writer and playwright (b. 1923)
- September 28 – Howard Graham, army officer, Chief of the General Staff (b. 1898)
- October 11 – Barker Fairley, painter (b. 1887 in the United Kingdom)
- October 26 – John Henry Cates, businessman and political figure (b. 1896)
- November 5 - Claude Jutra, actor, film director and writer (b. 1930)
- November 8 - King Clancy, ice hockey player (b. 1903)
- November 19 - Don Jamieson, politician, diplomat and broadcaster (b. 1921)
- December 24 – John Damien, racing steward whose 1975 dismissal from his job for being gay ultimately led to the inclusion of sexual orientation in the Ontario Human Rights Code in 1986
- December 31 - Donald Fleming, politician, International Monetary Fund official and lawyer (b. 1905)

== See also ==
- 1986 in Canadian television
- List of Canadian films of 1986
