= Louis Rasminsky =

3rd governor of the Bank of Canada

Louis Rasminsky CC CBE
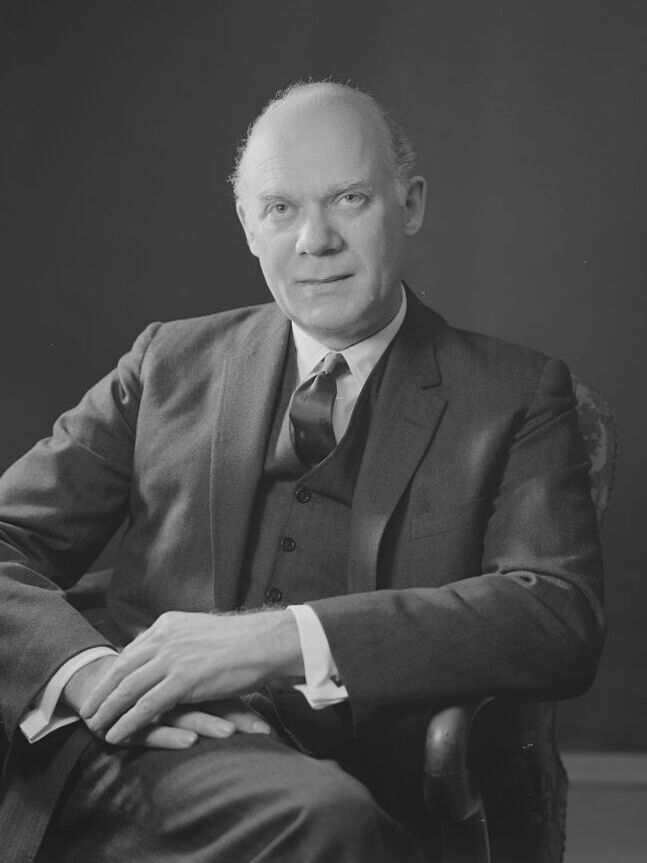
- Rasminsky c. 1964

3rd Governor of the Bank of Canada
- In office July 1961 – February 1, 1973
- Preceded by: James Coyne
- Succeeded by: Gerald Bouey

Personal details
- Born: February 1, 1908 Montreal, Quebec, Canada
- Died: September 15, 1998 (aged 90) Ottawa, Ontario, Canada
- Education: Harbord Collegiate Institute; University of Toronto; London School of Economics

Louis Rasminsky CC CBE (February 1, 1908 – September 15, 1998) was a Canadian economist who served as the third governor of the Bank of Canada from 1961 to 1973, succeeding James Coyne. He was succeeded by Gerald Bouey.

Born in Montreal, Quebec, he was raised in Toronto, graduated at Harbord Collegiate Institute, educated at the University of Toronto and the London School of Economics. In 1930, he started at the Economic and Financial Organization of the League of Nations as a specialist in monetary and banking issues. He joined the Bank of Canada in 1940, becoming executive assistant to the Governors of the Bank from 1943 to 1954 and Deputy Governor in 1955.

He served as Canada's executive director at the International Monetary Fund from 1946 until 1962. He was also executive director at the International Bank for Reconstruction and Development from 1950 to 1962.

In 1968, he was made a Companion of the Order of Canada, Canada's highest civilian honour, "for his services to Canada and a life-long career in the fields of international economic affairs and central banking". In 1968, he was awarded the Outstanding Achievement Award, the highest honour in the Public Service of Canada. He was the first Canadian to receive an honorary degree from Yeshiva University. He also received honorary degrees from Carleton University, Trent University, the University of British Columbia and Concordia University (1975).

In the 1960s, the Rideau Club in Ottawa declined to admit Rasminsky because he was Jewish. It succumbed to pressure from Prime Minister Lester B. Pearson, among others.

Canadian historian Bruce Muirhead received the Joseph and Fay Tanenbaum Award for Canadian Jewish History for his biography of Rasminsky, Against the Odds: The Public Life and Times of Louis Rasminsky (University of Toronto Press, 1999).

His daughter, Lola Rasminsky, is the founder and director of the Avenue Road Arts School in Toronto. His son, Dr. Michael Rasminsky, practiced neurology at the Montreal General Hospital.
