= Raymond Garneau =

Canadian politician

Member of the Canadian Parliament for Laval-des-Rapides
- In office 1984–1988
- Preceded by: Jeanne Sauvé
- Succeeded by: Jacques Tétreault

Member of the National Assembly of Quebec for Jean-Talon
- In office 1970–1978
- Preceded by: Henri Beaupré
- Succeeded by: Jean-Claude Rivest

Personal details
- Born: January 3, 1935 (age 91) Plessisville, Quebec, Canada
- Party: Liberal
- Other political affiliations: Quebec Liberal Party

Raymond Garneau, OC (born January 3, 1935) is a Canadian businessman and politician.

== Early life ==
Born in Plessisville, Quebec (located 30 km from Victoriaville, Quebec), the son of Daniel Garneau and Valérie Gosselin, he received a master's degree in commercial sciences from Université Laval in 1958 and a licence in economics from the University of Geneva in 1963.

== Provincial politics ==
From 1965 to 1970, he was the executive secretary and later executive assistant to Jean Lesage. He was elected to the National Assembly of Quebec as a Liberal in the riding of Jean-Talon in 1970. He was re-elected in 1973 and 1976. He held cabinet posts as Minister of Public Service (1970), Minister of Finance (1970–1976), president of the Treasury Board (1971–1976), and Minister of Education (1975–1976). He ran for the 1978 Quebec Liberal Party leadership election but lost to Claude Ryan. He resigned in 1978.

== Corporate interlude ==
In 1979, he became vice president of development for the Laurentian Group. From 1980 to 1984, he was the chairman and chief executive officer of the Montreal City and District Savings Bank and CEO of Credit Foncier.

== Federal politics ==
In 1984, he was elected to the House of Commons of Canada as a Liberal in the Quebec riding of Laval-des-Rapides. He sought reelection in the riding of Ahuntsic on the opposing bank of the Rivière des Prairies. He lost in 1988 by 692 votes. From 1984 to 1986, he was the president of the Quebec Liberal caucus and Liberal leader John Turner's Quebec lieutenant.

== Back to private life ==
From 1988 to 2005, he was the president and chief operating officer, president and chief executive officer, and chairman of the board of the Industrial Alliance Insurance and Financial Services Inc.

In 1996, he was appointed to the board of directors of the Bank of Canada. In 1991, he was elected director on the board of Laval University and became chairman of that board in 1997. In 2005, he was appointed chairman of the Advisory Commission for the Phase II: the Recommendations Phase of the Gomery Commission.

== Honours ==
In 1994, he was made an Officer of the Order of Canada for having "fulfilled his responsibilities with the utmost competence, efficiency, judgment and integrity, always seeking to contribute to the improved economic and social well-being of his fellow citizens".
