= Axford, Saskatchewan =

Axford
- Unincorporated community
- Location within Saskatchewan
- Coordinates: 49°39′14.56″N 104°25′24.15″W
- Country: Canada
- Province: Saskatchewan
- Region: Saskatchewan
- Time zone: CST
- Area code: 306

Axford is an unincorporated community in southeastern Saskatchewan and located 18.8 kilometres (11.7 mi) east of Khedive, Saskatchewan and north of Saskatchewan Highway 13 and due west of Weyburn, Saskatchewan.

A rural farming area, it is the birthplace of former Governor of the Bank of Canada Gerald Bouey.

== See also ==
- List of communities in Saskatchewan
