= Clarence Gosse =

Lieutenant governor of Nova Scotia from 1973 to 1978

The Honourable Clarence Lloyd Gosse OC

25th Lieutenant Governor of Nova Scotia
- In office October 1, 1973 – December 23, 1978
- Monarch: Elizabeth II
- Governors General: Roland Michener; Jules Léger
- Premier: Gerald Regan; John Buchanan
- Preceded by: Victor de Bedia Oland
- Succeeded by: John Elvin Shaffner

Personal details
- Born: Clarence Lloyd Gosse; October 20, 1912 Spaniard's Bay, Dominion of Newfoundland
- Died: December 21, 1996 (aged 84)

Clarence Lloyd Gosse OC (October 20, 1912 – December 21, 1996) was a Canadian physician and the 25th Lieutenant Governor of Nova Scotia.

Born in Spaniard's Bay, Newfoundland, he moved to Nova Scotia when he was ten. He graduated from the medical school of Dalhousie University in 1939. During World War II, serving in the Canadian Army Medical Corps, he was a member of one of the first surgical teams in the Battle of Normandy.

After the War, in Halifax, he was a Professor of Urology at Dalhousie University and Chair of the Department of Urology at the Victoria General and Camp Hill hospitals (now the Queen Elizabeth II Health Sciences Centre).

He was Lieutenant Governor of Nova Scotia from 1973 to 1978.

== Awards and recognition ==
width=100

In 1982, he was made an Officer of the Order of Canada.
