= Madeleine Dalphond-Guiral =

Canadian nurse, professor and politician

Madeleine Dalphond-Guiral (born June 6, 1938) is a Canadian nurse, professor and politician.

Dalphond-Gurial was a registered nurse by training and later a professor of nursing. She was first elected to the House of Commons of Canada as a Bloc Québécois MP for the riding of Laval Centre in the 1993 federal election. She served as Official Opposition Deputy Whip from 1994 to 1996, Chief BQ Whip from 1996 to 1997 and again as Deputy Whip until 2000. She also served in the BQ shadow cabinet as Citizenship and Immigration Critic from 2000 to 2004. She did not run in the 2004 federal election.

== Electoral record (partial) ==
1993 Canadian federal election: Laval Centre
Party	Candidate	Votes	%	±%	Expenditures
Bloc Québécois	Madeleine Dalphond-Guiral	31,462	55.19		$36,514
Liberal	Guymond Fortin	19,031	33.39	–	$55,391
Progressive Conservative	Bruno Fortier	4,548	7.98		$38,006
Natural Law	Yvon Dodier	675	1.18		$2,842
New Democratic Party	Afsun Qureshi	640	1.12		$400
National	Joe De Santis	252	0.44		$55
Commonwealth	Michel Destroismaisons	221	0.39		$0
Abolitionist	Emilien Martel	174	0.31		$1,848
Total valid votes/expense limit		57,003	100.00		
Total rejected ballots		2,200			
Turnout		59,203	79.48		
Electors on the lists		74,485			
Source: Thirty-fifth General Election, 1993: Official Voting Results, Published by the Chief Electoral Officer of Canada. Financial figures taken from official contributions and expenses provided by Elections Canada.

Parliament of Canada
Preceded by Jacques Tétreault	Member of Parliament for Laval Centre; 1993–2004	Succeeded by Electoral district was abolished in 2003
