= Laval Centre =

Former federal electoral district in Quebec, Canada

Coordinates: 45.569°N 73.722°W

Quebec electoral district

Defunct federal electoral district
- Legislature: House of Commons
- District created: 1976
- District abolished: 2003
- First contested: 1979
- Last contested: 2000

Laval Centre (French: Laval-Centre; formerly known as Laval-des-Rapides) was a federal electoral district in Quebec, Canada, that was represented in the House of Commons of Canada from 1979 to 2004.

It was created as "Laval-des-Rapides" riding in 1976 from parts of Laval, Ahuntsic, Dollard and Duvernay ridings.

It was renamed "Laval Centre" in 1990.

It was abolished in 2003 when it was redistributed between Laval and Marc-Aurèle-Fortin ridings.

== Members of Parliament ==
This riding elected the following members of Parliament:

Parliament	Years	Member	Party
Laval-des-Rapides; Riding created from Laval, Ahuntsic, Dollard and Duvernay
31st	1979–1980	Jeanne Sauvé	Liberal
32nd	1980–1984	Jeanne Sauvé	Liberal
32nd	1984–1984	Vacant	Vacant
33rd	1984–1988	Raymond Garneau	Liberal
34th	1988–1993	Jacques Tétreault	Progressive Conservative
Laval Centre
35th	1993–1997	Madeleine Dalphond-Guiral	Bloc Québécois
36th	1997–2000	Madeleine Dalphond-Guiral	Bloc Québécois
37th	2000–2004	Madeleine Dalphond-Guiral	Bloc Québécois
Riding dissolved into Laval and Marc-Aurèle-Fortin

== Election results ==
=== Laval-des-Rapides ===
1979 Canadian federal election
Party	Candidate	Votes
Liberal	Jeanne Sauvé	36,387
Progressive Conservative	Pierre Trudeau	5,033
Social Credit	Jean-Luc Roualdes	4,779
New Democratic	Pierre Ivan Laroche	3,702
Union populaire	François A. Lachapelle	472
Marxist–Leninist	Marc Bélanger	254

1980 Canadian federal election
Party	Candidate	Votes
Liberal	Jeanne Sauvé	33,317
New Democratic	Martin Vaillancourt	4,699
Progressive Conservative	Guy Villiard	3,049
Rhinoceros	Alain Bugs Bonnier	2,152
Social Credit	Jean-Luc Roualdes	911
Union populaire	Yves Henry	216
Marxist–Leninist	Marc Bélanger	100

1984 Canadian federal election
Party	Candidate	Votes
Liberal	Raymond Garneau	22,789
Progressive Conservative	Lawrence Hanigan	20,420
New Democratic	Léo St-Louis	5,215
Rhinoceros	Serge Lafortune	1,910
Parti nationaliste	Denis Bertrand	1,492
Commonwealth of Canada	François Lépine	90

1988 Canadian federal election
Party	Candidate	Votes
Progressive Conservative	Jacques Tétreault	27,955
Liberal	François Arsenault	14,926
New Democratic	John Shatilla	7,397
Green	Paul Savard	1,511
Commonwealth of Canada	Pierre Vigneault	224

=== Laval Centre ===
1993 Canadian federal election
Party	Candidate	Votes
Bloc Québécois	Madeleine Dalphond-Guiral	31,391
Liberal	Guymond Fortin	19,027
Progressive Conservative	Bruno Fortier	4,497
Natural Law	Yvon Dodier	662
New Democratic	Afsun Qureshi	630
National	Joe De Santis	323
Commonwealth of Canada	Michel Destroismaisons	268
Abolitionist	Emilien Martel	172

1997 Canadian federal election
Party	Candidate	Votes
Bloc Québécois	Madeleine Dalphond-Guiral	22,668
Liberal	Sylvie Matteau	20,222
Progressive Conservative	Alain Dubois	13,132
New Democratic	Jean-Yves Dion	1,188

2000 Canadian federal election
Party	Candidate	Votes
Bloc Québécois	Madeleine Dalphond-Guiral	23,746
Liberal	Pierre Lafleur	23,704
Progressive Conservative	Guy Fortin	2,778
Alliance	Eric Marchand	2,437
Green	Julien Bernard	1,285
New Democratic	Jean-Yves Dion	832

== See also ==
- List of Canadian electoral districts
- Historical federal electoral districts of Canada
