= Bruce Muirhead =

Canadian historian and academic

Bruce Muirhead is a Canadian historian and academic whose work focuses on Canada's foreign trade policy.

From 1985 to 2006, Muirhead taught at Lakehead University. Currently at the University of Waterloo, he teaches Canadian history, the American impact on Canada, and Canada's foreign economic policy in the 20th century. He is professor of history, Egg Farmers of Canada chair in public policy and associate dean of graduate studies and research.

In recent years Muirhead's focus has shifted to Canadian development policies. With his fellow historian Ron Harpelle, Muirhead has published two books on the history of the International Development Research Center. Muirhead is also a senior fellow at Waterloo's Centre for International Governance Innovation.

== Bibliography ==
- Long-Term Solutions for a Short Term World: Canada and Research and Development (Wilfrid Laurier University Press, forthcoming).
- CRDI: 40 ans d'idées, d'innovations et d'impacts (Les Presses de l'Université Laval, 2010).
- The International Development Research Centre: 40 Years of Ideas, Innovation and Impact (Wilfrid Laurier University Press, 2010),
- Dancing Around the Elephant: Creating a Prosperous Canada in an Era of American Dominance, 1957-1973 (University of Toronto Press, 2005),
- Against the Odds: the Public Life and Times of Louis Rasminsky (University of Toronto Press, 1999), and
- The Development of Post-War Canadian Trade Policy: the Decline of the Anglo-European Option (McGill-Queen's University Press, 1992).

For Against the Odds, he received the Joseph and Fay Tanenbaum Award for Canadian Jewish History.

== See also ==
- List of University of Waterloo people
- List of Canadian historians
