= Jacques Tétreault =

Canadian politician and lawyer (1929–2018)

2nd Mayor of Laval
- In office 1965–1973
- Preceded by: Jean-Noël Lavoie
- Succeeded by: Lucien Paiement

Member of Parliament for Laval-des-Rapides
- In office 1988–1993
- Preceded by: Raymond Garneau
- Succeeded by: Madeleine Dalphond-Guiral

Personal details
- Born: 8 April 1929 Montreal, Quebec, Canada
- Died: 20 August 2018 (aged 89)
- Spouse(s): Lise DesRosiers (m. 1957)
- Education: Collège Sainte-Marie de Montréal
- Profession: Lawyer, magistrate, teacher

Jacques Tétreault (French pronunciation: [ʒak tetʁo]; 8 April 1929 – 20 August 2018) was a Canadian politician and lawyer who was a member of the House of Commons of Canada from 1988 to 1993. His background was in law.

He was elected in the 1988 federal election at the Laval-des-Rapides electoral district for the Progressive Conservative party. He served in the 34th Canadian Parliament but did not seek another term in Parliament in the 1993 federal election.

Tétrault had also previously served as mayor of Laval between 1965 and 1973. He also was a leadership candidate for the Union Nationale in May 1976, but was defeated by Rodrigue Biron.

A street near the Montmorency metro station in Laval is named after him.

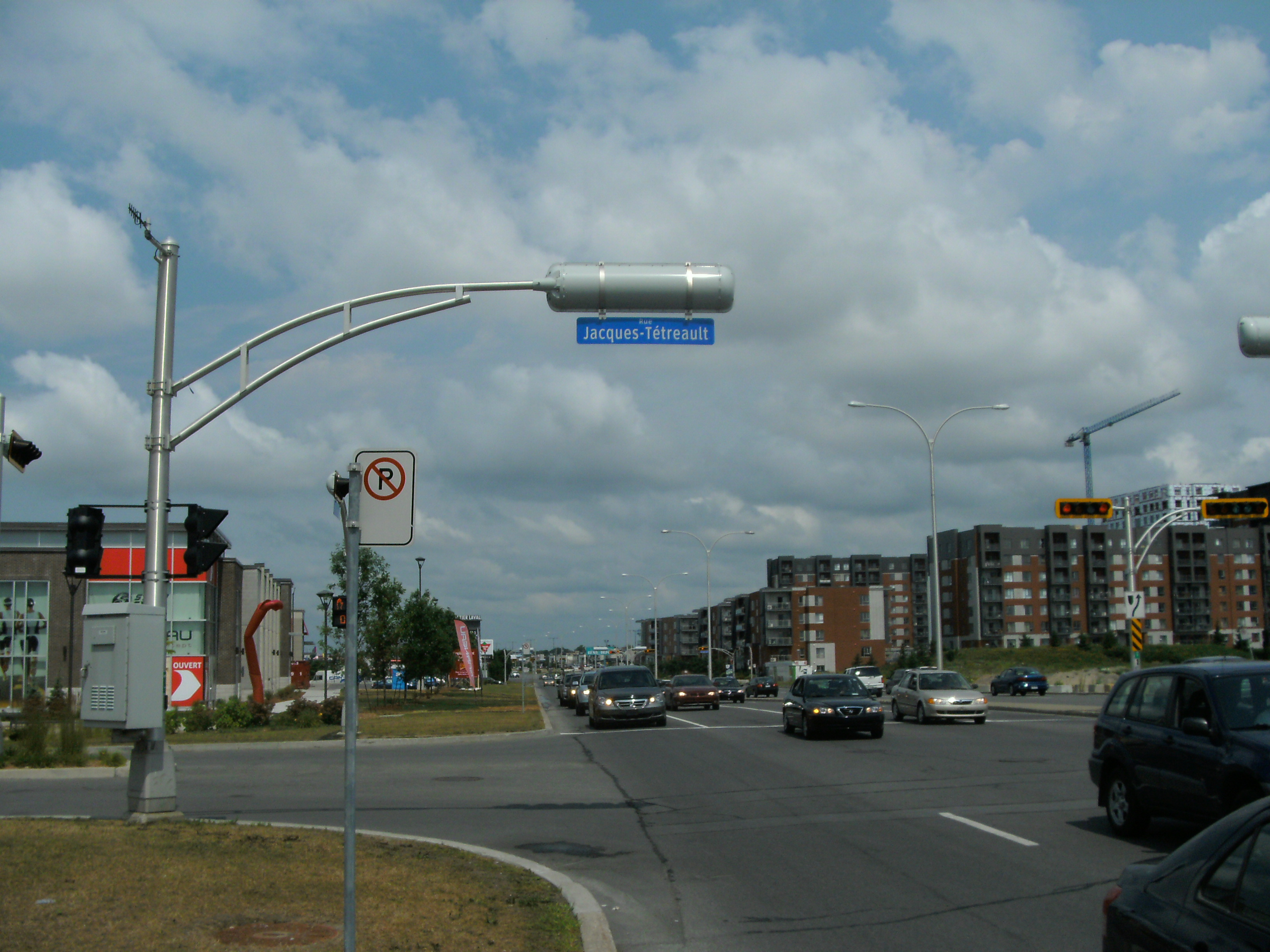
Street sign identifying rue Jacques-Tétreault in Laval.
