= Gérard Charles Édouard Thériault =

Canadian general (1932–1998)

- Born: June 5, 1932; Gaspé, Quebec
- Died: October 13, 1998 (aged 66) Victoria, British Columbia
- Allegiance: Canada
- Branch: Royal Canadian Air Force / Canadian Forces
- Service years: 1956–1989
- Rank: General
- Awards: Commander of the Order of Military Merit; Canadian Forces' Decoration
- Other work: President of AEG Canada Inc

General Gérard Charles Édouard Thériault, CMM, CD (June 5, 1932 in Gaspé, Quebec, Canada – October 13, 1998 in Victoria, British Columbia, Canada) was Chief of the Defence Staff between 1983 and 1986.

== Military service ==
Thériault graduated from Sir George Williams University (now Concordia University) in Montreal.

He joined the Royal Canadian Air Force in 1951. His first solo flight, where he earned his wings, took place on June 5, 1952, in a Harvard aircraft.

He was a proponent of the unification of the military of Canada. In 1967 he was promoted to wing commander and moved to the Collège Militaire Royal (CMR), St-Jean, Qué, now Royal Military College Saint-Jean where he served as vice-commandant until 1970. Promoted to colonel, he became commandant of the CMR in 1970. In 1971, he was assigned command of Canadian Forces Base Bagotville in Northern Québec.

In 1973, he was promoted to brigadier general and took over command of 1 CAG (First Canadian Air Group) in Germany. In 1975, he was promoted to major general and assumed command of Air Command in Winnipeg, Manitoba. In 1977, he was transferred to Ottawa as the CADO (Chief, Air Doctrine Operations).

In 1979, he was installed as the Deputy Chief of Defence Staff (DCDS). In 1980, he became Vice Chief of the Defence Staff and Chief of the Defence Staff in 1983 before retiring in 1986.

He was President of AEG Canada Inc. until 1995.

Academic offices
Preceded by K. Stuart	Commandant of the Royal Military College Saint-Jean; 1970–1971	Succeeded by H. H. Matthews
Military offices
Preceded by R.M. Withers	Vice Chief of the Defence Staff; 1980–1983	Succeeded by D.N. Mainguy
Preceded by R.M. Withers	Chief of the Defence Staff; 1983–1986	Succeeded by P.D. Manson
