= Henry Pybus Bell-Irving =

Lieutenant Governor of British Columbia (1913–2002)

Brigadier The Honourable Henry Pybus Bell-Irving OC, DSO, OBE, OBC, ED, CD

23rd Lieutenant-Governor of British Columbia
- In office May 18, 1978 – July 15, 1983
- Monarch: Elizabeth II
- Governors General: Jules Léger; Edward Schreyer
- Premier: Bill Bennett
- Preceded by: Walter Stewart Owen
- Succeeded by: Robert Gordon Rogers

Personal details
- Born: January 21, 1913 Vancouver, British Columbia
- Died: September 21, 2002 (aged 89)

Henry Pybus "Budge" Bell-Irving, OC DSO OBE OBC ED CD (January 21, 1913 – September 21, 2002) was a Canadian military officer and politician who served as the 23rd Lieutenant Governor of British Columbia from 1978 to 1983.

Born in Vancouver, he was educated at Shawnigan Lake School on Vancouver Island and Loretto at Musselburgh, Scotland. He returned to attend the University of British Columbia, but withdrew because of the war. During World War II, Bell-Irving served with The Seaforth Highlanders of Canada and commanded a company of the battalion in Sicily and Italy and northwest Europe before becoming the commander of the 10th Canadian Infantry Brigade.

Next he returned to Vancouver and he joined his family real estate company, Bell-Irving Insurance Agencies, which later merged with A.E. LePage in 1972. In 1974 he was elected Chairman of the Vancouver Board of Trade.

In 1978, Governor General Jules Léger, on the advice of Prime Minister Pierre Trudeau, appointed him Lieutenant-Governor of BC.

Bell-Irving met his wife, Nancy, while attending UBC and was married in April 1937.

== Honours ==
- 1984 - he was made an Officer of the Order of Canada
- 1985 - he received the Order of British Columbia.
- 1986 - he was appointed Freeman of the City of Vancouver
