= Gilles Lamontagne =

Canadian politician (1919–2016)

The Honourable Gilles Lamontagne PC OC CQ CD

24th Lieutenant Governor of Quebec
- In office March 28, 1984 – August 9, 1990
- Monarch: Elizabeth II
- Governors General: Edward Schreyer; Jeanne Sauvé; Ray Hnatyshyn
- Premier: René Lévesque; Pierre-Marc Johnson; Robert Bourassa
- Preceded by: Jean-Pierre Côté
- Succeeded by: Martial Asselin

Minister of National Defence
- In office March 3, 1980 – August 11, 1983
- Prime Minister: Pierre Trudeau
- Preceded by: Allan McKinnon
- Succeeded by: Jean–Jacques Blais

Minister of Veterans Affairs
- Acting; October 1, 1980 – September 21, 1981
- Prime Minister: Pierre Trudeau
- Preceded by: Daniel J. MacDonald
- Succeeded by: W. Bennett Campbell

Postmaster General of Canada
- In office February 2, 1978 – June 3, 1979
- Prime Minister: Pierre Trudeau
- Preceded by: Jean-Jacques Blais
- Succeeded by: John Allen Fraser

Minister without portfolio
- In office January 19, 1978 – February 1, 1978
- Prime Minister: Pierre Trudeau

Member of Parliament for Langelier
- In office May 24, 1977 – March 26, 1984
- Preceded by: Jean Marchand
- Succeeded by: Michel Côté

Mayor of Quebec City
- In office December 1, 1965 – December 1, 1977
- Preceded by: Wilfrid Hamel
- Succeeded by: Jean Pelletier

Personal details
- Born: Joseph Georges Gilles Claude Lamontagne; April 17, 1919 Montreal, Quebec, Canada
- Died: June 14, 2016 (aged 97) Quebec City, Quebec, Canada
- Party: Liberal
- Spouse: Mary Schaefer (m. 1949; died 2006)
- Occupation: Merchant

Military service
- Allegiance: Canada
- Branch/service: Royal Canadian Air Force
- Years of service: 1941–1945
- Rank: Flight Lieutenant / Bomber Pilot
- Awards: Canadian Forces' Decoration; Order of Canada; National Order of Quebec

Joseph Georges Gilles Claude Lamontagne PC OC CQ CD (French: [ʒozɛf ʒɔʁʒ(ə) ʒil klod lamɔ̃taɲ]; April 17, 1919 – June 14, 2016) was a Canadian politician who held a number of offices both in Quebec and federally. A Liberal, he was Mayor of Quebec City (1965–1977), Postmaster General of Canada (1978–1979), Minister of National Defence (1980–1983) and the 24th Lieutenant Governor of Quebec (1984–1990).

== Early life ==
He was born in Montreal. During World War II, Lamontagne served as a bomber pilot in the Royal Canadian Air Force with 425 Squadron and was shot down over the Netherlands in 1943, being detained as a prisoner of war until May 1945. He ended his air force service with the rank of flight lieutenant. In 1946, he settled in Quebec City and entered the importing business. He became a member of the Rotary Club of Quebec City with his partner and neighbour Jean Poliquin.

== Career ==
He entered politics and was elected mayor of Quebec City in 1965. He held that post until he won a seat in the House of Commons of Canada as a Liberal Party candidate in a 1977 by-election. In 1978, he entered the Cabinet of Prime Minister Pierre Trudeau, serving briefly as a Minister without Portfolio before becoming Postmaster General. He served in that position until the defeat of the government in the 1979 election. When the Liberals returned to power in the 1980 election, Lamontagne returned to Cabinet as Minister of National Defence.

=== Lieutenant-Governor of Quebec (1984–90) ===
In 1984, he left politics to accept the position of Lieutenant-Governor of Quebec, and served as the province's viceroy until his retirement in 1990.

== Personal life ==
Lamontagne married Mary Schaefer in 1949 and had four children and five grandchildren. Schaefer died in 2006. Lamontagne died in 2016 at the age of 97. In 1990, he was made an Officer of the Order of Canada. In 2000, he was made a Knight of the National Order of Quebec and in 2005, a member of l'Ordre des Grands Québécois. He was an honorary member of the Royal Military College of Canada club student # H15200.

== Arms ==
Coat of arms of Gilles Lamontagne
Notes The arms of Gilles Lamontagne consist of: Crest Above a helm on a wreath Argent and Azure a demi Snowy Owl (Nyctea Scandiaca) displayed of the first gorged with a collar of the second charged with a mullet Argent, each wing charged with two fleurs de lys Azure mantled Azure doubled Argent. Escutcheon Azure on a mount between two swords paleways, hilts in base a double-towered fortress gate all Argent, masoned of the first, in chief a coronet of six fleurs de lys, three visible, also Argent. Supporters Dexter a Moose (Alces alces) Argent gorged with a collar of maple leaves Gules, sinister a Moose of the first gorged with a collar of fleurs de lys Azure, roses Gules, thistles and shamrocks Vert alternately. Motto Deo Favente Vincit Vim Virtus

== Archives ==
There is a Gilles Lamonagne fonds at Library and Archives Canada and the Quebec City archives.

== See also ==
- List of mayors of Quebec City
