= Gerald Bouey =

4th governor of the Bank of Canada

Gerald Bouey CC

4th Governor of the Bank of Canada
- In office February 1, 1973 – February 1, 1987
- Preceded by: Louis Rasminsky
- Succeeded by: John Crow

Personal details
- Born: Gerald Keith Bouey; April 2, 1920 Axford, Saskatchewan, Canada
- Died: February 6, 2004 (aged 83) Ottawa, Ontario, Canada
- Spouse: Anne Bouey
- Children: 2
- Education: Queen's University (BAH)
- Occupation: Head of central bank
- Profession: Economist

Gerald Keith Bouey CC (April 2, 1920 – February 6, 2004) was a Canadian economist who served as the fourth governor of the Bank of Canada from 1973 to 1987, succeeding Louis Rasminsky. He was succeeded by John Crow.

Born in Axford, Saskatchewan, Bouey earned an Honours Bachelor of Arts in Economics at Queen's University. During the Second World War, he served with the Royal Canadian Air Force, attaining the rank of flight lieutenant. In 1948 Bouey joined the Bank of Canada Research Department and became Assistant Chief in 1953, Deputy Chief in 1956 and Chief of Research in 1962. Bouey became Advisor to the Governor in 1965, Deputy Governor in 1969, Senior Deputy Governor in 1972, and Governor in 1973. In 1981, he was made an Officer of the Order of Canada and promoted to Companion in 1987. His wife is Anne, and they had two children, Kathryn and Robert.
