= Minister of Communications (Canada) =

The minister of communications of Canada was a cabinet post which existed from 1969 to 1996, when it was abolished. Its telecommunications policy functions were transferred to the Minister of Industry and its cultural role was assumed by the Minister of Canadian Heritage.

The post was established by the Department of Communications Act, and abolished by the repeal of that act in 1995. During its existence, the department was authorized to oversee radio, television, and telephone communications in Canada, and supervised the CRTC.

== Ministers of communications ==
Key:

Liberal Party of Canada
Progressive Conservative Party of Canada

| No. | Name | Term of office | | Political party | Ministry |
|---|---|---|---|---|---|
| 1 | Eric Kierans | April 1, 1969 | April 28, 1971 | Liberal | 20 (P. E. Trudeau) |
| * | Jean-Pierre Côté (Acting) | April 29, 1971 | May 10, 1971 | Liberal | 20 (P. E. Trudeau) |
| * | Gérard Pelletier (Acting) | May 11, 1971 | August 11, 1971 | Liberal | 20 (P. E. Trudeau) |
| 2 | Robert Stanbury | August 12, 1971 | November 26, 1972 | Liberal | 20 (P. E. Trudeau) |
| 3 | Gérard Pelletier | November 27, 1972 | August 28, 1975 | Liberal | 20 (P. E. Trudeau) |
| 4 | Pierre Juneau | August 29, 1975 | October 24, 1975 | Liberal | 20 (P. E. Trudeau) |
| * | Otto Lang | October 25, 1975 | December 4, 1975 | Liberal | 20 (P. E. Trudeau) |
| 5 | Jeanne Sauvé | December 5, 1975 | June 3, 1979 | Liberal | 20 (P. E. Trudeau) |
| 6 | David MacDonald | June 4, 1979 | March 2, 1980 | Progressive Conservative | 21 (Clark) |
| 7 | Francis Fox | March 3, 1980 | June 29, 1984 | Liberal | 22 (P. E. Trudeau) |
| 8 | Ed Lumley | June 30, 1984 | September 16, 1984 | Liberal | 23 (Turner) |
| 9 | Marcel Masse | September 17, 1984 | September 25, 1985 | Progressive Conservative | 24 (Mulroney) |
| * | Benoît Bouchard (Acting) | September 26, 1985 | November 29, 1985 | Progressive Conservative | 24 (Mulroney) |
| (9) | Marcel Masse (Second time) | November 30, 1985 | June 29, 1986 | Progressive Conservative | 24 (Mulroney) |
| 10 | Flora MacDonald | June 30, 1986 | December 7, 1988 | Progressive Conservative | 24 (Mulroney) |
| * | Lowell Murray (Acting) | December 8, 1988 | January 29, 1989 | Progressive Conservative | 24 (Mulroney) |
| (9) | Marcel Masse (Third time) | January 30, 1989 | April 20, 1991 | Progressive Conservative | 24 (Mulroney) |
| 11 | Perrin Beatty | April 21, 1991 | June 24, 1993 | Progressive Conservative | 24 (Mulroney) |
| 12 | Monique Landry | June 25, 1993 | November 3, 1993 | Progressive Conservative | 25 (Campbell) |
| 13 | Michel Dupuy | November 4, 1993 | January 24, 1996 | Liberal | 26 (Chrétien) |
| 14 | Sheila Copps | January 25, 1996 | May 1, 1996 (Note: Resigned from Parliament to fulfill her promise to resign if the GST was not abolished) | Liberal | 26 (Chrétien) |
| 14 | Sheila Copps | June 19, 1996 (Note: Returned to Parliament following a by-election) | July 11, 1996 | Liberal | 26 (Chrétien) |

On July 12, 1996, office of the Minister of Communications and the office of the Minister of Multiculturalism and Citizenship were abolished and replaced with the office of Minister of Canadian Heritage (list).
