= John Elvin Shaffner =

Canadian politician (1911–2001)

The Honourable John Elvin Shaffner

26th Lieutenant Governor of Nova Scotia
- In office December 23, 1978 – February 1, 1984
- Monarch: Elizabeth II
- Governors General: Jules Léger; Edward Schreyer
- Premier: John Buchanan
- Preceded by: Clarence Gosse
- Succeeded by: Alan Abraham

Personal details
- Born: March 3, 1911 Lawrencetown, Nova Scotia
- Died: June 11, 2001 (aged 90) Halifax, Nova Scotia
- Spouse: Nell Margaret Potter
- Profession: Businessman

John Elvin Shaffner (March 3, 1911 – June 11, 2001) was a businessman and political figure in Nova Scotia. He served as the 26th Lieutenant Governor of Nova Scotia from 1978 to 1984. His surname also appears as Schaffner in some sources.

He was born in Lawrencetown, Nova Scotia and was educated there, at Acadia University and at the Bentley School of Accounting and Finance in Boston. In 1936, he married Nell Margaret Potter (she died 30 September 2010). Shaffner worked as a chartered accountant for several years. Later, he was president of 7 Up Maritimes Ltd. and M.W. Graves & Company. He also served on the board of governors for Acadia University. He served as agent-general for Nova Scotia in the United Kingdom and Europe from 1973 to 1976. Shaffner died at the age of 90 in 2001.
