= Joseph Aubin Doiron =

Canadian politician

The Honourable Joseph Aubin Doiron CM

22nd Lieutenant Governor of Prince Edward Island
- In office January 14, 1980 – August 1, 1985
- Monarch: Elizabeth II
- Governors General: Edward Schreyer; Jeanne Sauvé
- Premier: J. Angus MacLean; James M. Lee
- Preceded by: Gordon Lockhart Bennett
- Succeeded by: Lloyd MacPhail

Personal details
- Born: June 10, 1922 North Rustico, Prince Edward Island
- Died: January 29, 1995 (aged 72) Summerside, Prince Edward Island
- Spouse: Rose Bernice Gallant
- Children: Paul, Robert, Pierre, Simonne, Colette, Omer and Marc
- Education: Université de Montréal
- Occupation: Dentist

Joseph Aubin Doiron, CM (June 10, 1922 – January 29, 1995) was the 22nd Lieutenant Governor of Prince Edward Island from 1980 to 1985, becoming the province's second Acadian to hold this position.

Doiron was born in North Rustico in 1922. Following his early education in local schools, he went on to receive his B.A. from Sainte-Anne's College in Nova Scotia and his D.D.S from the Université de Montréal in 1951.

He was married to Rose Bernice Gallant of Duvar, PEI, and together they had seven children. Before his appointment as Lieutenant-Governor, Doiron practiced dentistry in Summerside.

Aubin Doiron was appointed Lieutenant-Governor of Prince Edward Island on January 14, 1980. Doiron had always been active in Acadian affairs, and was the founding President and Chairman of the Acadian Mardi Gras Association, as well as a charter member and President of the Acadian Museum Association in Miscouche.

He was also a past President of the Dental Association of Prince Edward Island and a representative on the Board of Governors of the Canadian Dental Association. Doiron was also a member of the Greater Summerside and Area Chamber of Commerce and a past director of the Prince Edward Island Heritage Foundation.

In 1994, he was made a Member of the Order of Canada.

Joseph Aubin Doiron died at the age of 72 in 1995.
