= Tony Paddon =

Canadian politician

The Honourable Tony Paddon OC

7th Lieutenant Governor of Newfoundland
- In office July 10, 1981 – September 5, 1986
- Monarch: Elizabeth II
- Governors General: Edward Schreyer; Jeanne Sauvé
- Premier: Brian Peckford
- Preceded by: Gordon Arnaud Winter
- Succeeded by: James McGrath

Personal details
- Born: July 10, 1914 Indian Harbour, Newfoundland
- Died: January 5, 1995 (aged 80)

Military service
- Allegiance: Canada
- Branch/service: Royal Canadian Navy
- Rank: Lieutenant-commander
- Battles/wars: Second World War

William Anthony Paddon, OC (July 10, 1914 – January 5, 1995) was a Canadian surgeon and the seventh lieutenant governor of Newfoundland from 1981 to 1986.

Born in Indian Harbour, Labrador, Newfoundland, the son of Dr. Harry Locke Paddon (1881-1939) and Mina Gilchrist, a physician and a nurse, respectively, with the International Grenfell Association. He received a Bachelor of Science in 1936 from Trinity College in Hartford, Connecticut. He received his Doctor of Medicine in 1940 from New York Medical College. During World War II, he served with the Royal Canadian Navy as a surgeon.

After the war, he returned to Labrador with the International Grenfell Association, serving as physician at the North West River hospital. He was the director of the IGA from 1960 until his retirement in 1978. He married Sheila Fortescue, also an IGA nurse.

In 1981, he was the first, and so far only Labradorian to be appointed Lieutenant-Governor of Newfoundland and Labrador. He served until 1986.

In 1986, he published his autobiography, Labrador Doctor: My Life with the Grenfell Mission.

In 1977 he received an honorary doctorate from Memorial University. In 1978, he was made a Member of the Order of Canada and was promoted to Officer in 1988.

On 21 June 2014, a new building at CFS St. John's was named after him.
