= Pearl McGonigal =

Canadian politician (born 1929)

The Honourable Pearl McGonigal CM OM

19th Lieutenant Governor of Manitoba
- In office October 23, 1981 – December 11, 1986
- Monarch: Elizabeth II
- Governors General: Edward Schreyer; Jeanne Sauvé
- Premier: Sterling Lyon; Howard Pawley
- Preceded by: Francis Lawrence Jobin
- Succeeded by: George Johnson

Personal details
- Born: Pearl Kathryne McGonigal; June 10, 1929 (age 97) Melville, Saskatchewan, Canada
- Education: University of Manitoba
- Occupation: Banker, merchandising representative
- Profession: Politician

Pearl Kathryne McGonigal CM OM (born June 10, 1929) is a retired Manitoba politician and office-holder. She was a prominent Winnipeg-area municipal politician from 1969 to 1981, and served as the province's 19th Lieutenant Governor from October 23, 1981 to December 11, 1986. She was the first woman to serve as Lieutenant Governor of Manitoba and only the second woman to serve as a viceroy in Canadian history, after Pauline McGibbon of Ontario.

McGonigal was born in Melville, Saskatchewan. Before entering politics, she spent nine years in the banking sector and seven as a merchandising representative.

McGonigal was elected to the city council of St. James-Assiniboia in 1969, two years before its amalgamation with Winnipeg. Following amalgamation, she served on the Greater City Council from 1971 to 1981, and was the city's Deputy Mayor from 1979 to 1981. Throughout her time on council, she was a member of the Independent Citizens' Election Committee, an unofficial alliance of right-wing and pro-development interest groups in the city (McGonigal's husband was a prominent Winnipeg-area developer).

McGonigal was appointed Lt. Governor of Manitoba by Governor General Edward Schreyer, on the advice of Pierre Trudeau, in 1981. The office was essentially a ceremonial post by this time, and McGonigal had little if any practical influence over the government of Howard Pawley during her time in office. She was notable, however, as the first woman in Manitoba (and only the second in Canada) to hold such a position.

McGonigal has also worked as the Manitoba chair of the Council for Canadian Unity. She was appointed to the Order of Canada in 1994 and the Order of Manitoba in 2000. In 2003, she received the President's Award from the Winnipeg Press Club. She is a gourmet cook that has written regular columns on the subject in Winnipeg's daily and community newspapers.

Also during the early 2000s, McGonigal served as Chairman of the Canadian Forces Liaison Council in Manitoba, which regularly lobbies public bodies and private businesses to grant time off to military reservists for training purposes.

Succeeded by George Johnson
Order of precedence
Preceded by Richard J. F. Chartier as Chief Justice of Manitoba	Order of precedence in Manitoba as a former Lieutenant Governor of Manitoba	Succeeded by Yvon Dumont as a former Lieutenant Governor of Manitoba
