= John Buchanan (Canadian politician) =

Premier of Nova Scotia from 1978 to 1990

The Honourable John Buchanan PC ECNS QC
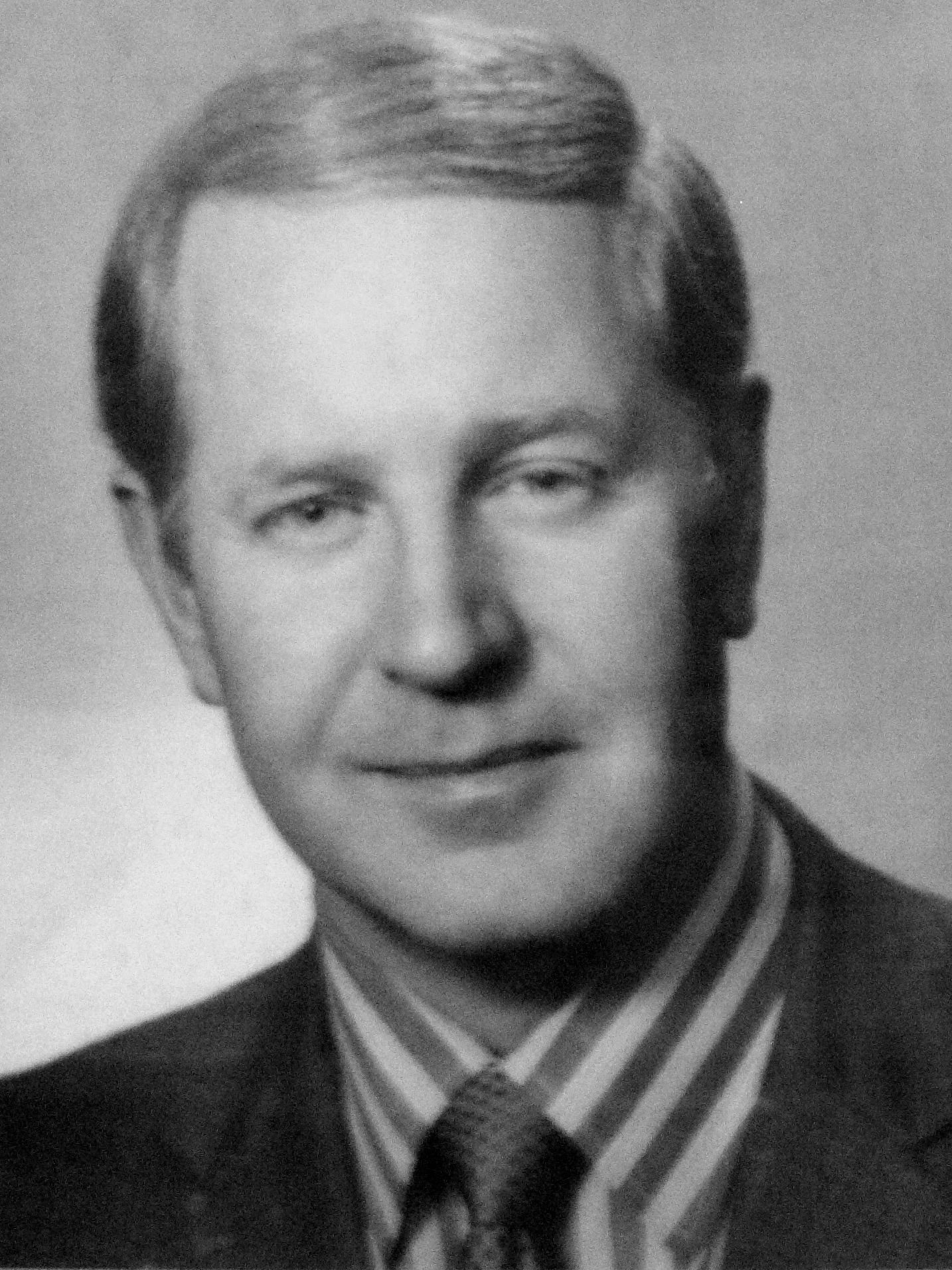
- Buchanan, c. 1973

20th Premier of Nova Scotia
- In office October 5, 1978 – September 12, 1990
- Monarch: Elizabeth II
- Lieutenant Governor: Clarence Gosse; John E. Shaffner; Alan Abraham; Lloyd Crouse
- Preceded by: Gerald Regan
- Succeeded by: Roger Bacon

MLA for Halifax Atlantic
- In office May 30, 1967 – September 11, 1990
- Preceded by: Riding established
- Succeeded by: Robert Chisholm

Senator for Halifax, Nova Scotia
- In office September 11, 1990 – April 22, 2006
- Appointed by: Brian Mulroney

Personal details
- Born: John MacLennan Buchanan; April 22, 1931 Sydney, Nova Scotia, Canada
- Died: October 3, 2019 (aged 88) Halifax, Nova Scotia, Canada
- Party: Progressive Conservative
- Other political affiliations: Progressive Conservative; Conservative
- Spouse: Mavis Buchanan (m. 1954)

John MacLennan Buchanan PC ECNS QC (April 22, 1931 – October 3, 2019) was a Canadian lawyer and politician who served as the 20th premier of Nova Scotia from 1978 to 1990 and as a member of the Senate of Canada from 1990 to 2006.

== Early life and education ==
John Buchanan was born on April 22, 1931 in Sydney, Nova Scotia, the son of Flora Isabel Campbell and Murdoch William Buchanan. He attended secondary school at Sydney Academy, and became employed in the steel mill in Sydney following his graduation. He graduated from Mount Allison University in 1954 with a Bachelor of Science degree and a Certificate in Engineering. He then went on to study at Dalhousie Law School, and after graduating in 1958 entered the practice of law where he was appointed Queen's Counsel in 1972 and awarded Doctorates from Nova Scotia Technical College, Mount Allison University, Saint Mary's University, St. Francis Xavier University, and Université Saint Anne.

== Political beginnings ==
Buchanan began his career in provincial politics in 1967, when he was elected as a Progressive Conservative (PC) Member of the Nova Scotia Legislative Assembly for the new riding of Halifax Atlantic. Following the resignation of Premier Robert Stanfield, Buchanan served on Executive Council as the minister of Fisheries and Public Works from 1967 to 1970 under Premier George Isaac Smith.

== Leader of the Progressive Conservatives ==
Buchanan retained his seat in the 1970 Nova Scotia general election, but Smith's PC government was brought down by the Liberals under Gerald Regan. Smith resigned as leader of the PCs the following year, and Buchanan was chosen as the party's new leader on March 6, 1971. He was re-elected to the House in the 1974 Nova Scotia general election, but the Liberals narrowly formed a minority government.

== Premier of Nova Scotia ==
Buchanan was elected as Premier of Nova Scotia in 1978. He was re-elected in 1981, 1984 and 1988, becoming the third Premier in Nova Scotia to be elected to four consecutive terms (following George Henry Murray and Robert Stanfield), and the fourth longest serving premier in the history of the province. On April 17, 1982, Buchanan was made a member of Her Majesty's Privy Council. His biggest majority came in the 1984 election, when he led his party to victory, capturing 42 of the 52 seats in the legislature.

The Buchanan government had a focus on the development of energy and natural resources, and successfully established the first tidal power plant in North America at the Annapolis Tidal Station in 1984. His policies emphasized reducing domestic energy costs by increasing coal production and harnessing the province's offshore petroleum. Buchanan's government invested significantly in public infrastructure, building new schools and hospitals across the province.

Buchanan resigned as Premier when he was appointed to the Senate of Canada by Brian Mulroney on September 12, 1990. He was succeeded by Roger Bacon as interim Premier. Buchanan's resignation was mired by scandal; in June 1990, the former deputy minister of government services Michael Zareski alleged before a legislature committee that the Buchanan government was engaging in cronyism, awarding government contracts to friends in exchange for payment. Zareski levelled allegations against Buchanan himself, claiming he had personally benefitted from secret deals and directed millions of dollars in government funds to his connections. The Royal Canadian Mounted Police (RCMP) investigated the allegations against Buchanan, and in September 1991 concluded that there was no evidence of criminal wrongdoing.

== Senator ==
Following his appointment in 1990, Buchanan sat as a Progressive Conservative senator until 2004, when the party merged with the Canadian Alliance. He then sat as a member of the Conservative Party of Canada from 2004 until his retirement at age 75 on April 22, 2006.

== Personal life ==
He married Mavis Forsyth in September 1954, and they had five children. Buchanan died on October 3, 2019, at the age of 88.
