= Jeanne Sauvé =

Governor General of Canada from 1984 to 1990

The Right Honourable Jeanne Sauvé PC CC CMM CD
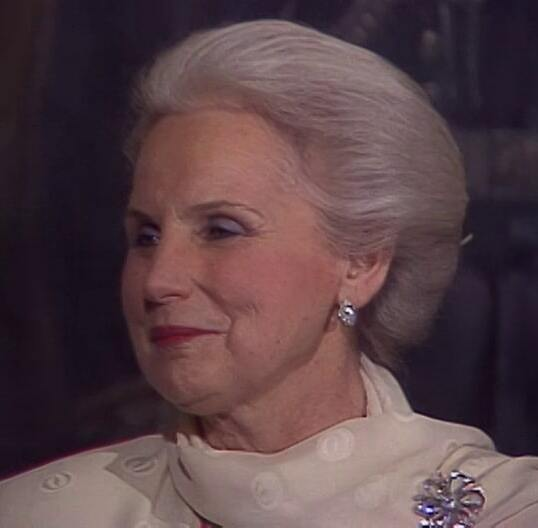
- Sauvé in 1987

23rd Governor General of Canada
- In office May 14, 1984 – January 28, 1990
- Monarch: Elizabeth II
- Prime Minister: Pierre Trudeau; John Turner; Brian Mulroney
- Preceded by: Edward Schreyer
- Succeeded by: Ray Hnatyshyn

29th Speaker of the House of Commons
- In office April 14, 1980 – January 15, 1984
- Preceded by: James Jerome
- Succeeded by: Lloyd Francis

Minister of Communications
- In office December 5, 1975 – June 4, 1979
- Prime Minister: Pierre Trudeau
- Preceded by: Otto Lang
- Succeeded by: David MacDonald

Minister of the Environment
- In office August 8, 1974 – December 5, 1975
- Prime Minister: Pierre Trudeau
- Preceded by: Jack Davis
- Succeeded by: Roméo LeBlanc

Member of Parliament for Laval-des-Rapides Ahuntsic (1972–1979)
- In office October 30, 1972 – January 15, 1984
- Preceded by: Jean-Léo Rochon
- Succeeded by: Raymond Garneau

Personal details
- Born: Jeanne Mathilde Benoît; April 26, 1922 Prud'homme, Saskatchewan, Canada
- Died: January 26, 1993 (aged 70) Montreal, Quebec, Canada
- Party: Liberal
- Spouse: Maurice Sauvé (m. 1948; died 1992)
- Profession: Politician; journalist

Jeanne Mathilde Sauvé (French: [ʒan sove]; née Benoît; April 26, 1922 – January 26, 1993) was a Canadian politician, journalist and stateswoman who served as the 23rd governor general of Canada from 1984 to 1990 and as the 29th speaker of the House of Commons from 1980 to 1984. She was the first woman to hold either office, and is to date the only woman to serve as speaker of the House of Commons.

Sauvé was born in Prud'homme, Saskatchewan, and educated in Ottawa and Paris, prior to working as a journalist for the Canadian Broadcasting Corporation (CBC). She was then elected to the House of Commons in 1972, whereafter she served as a minister of the Crown until 1980, when she became the Speaker. She was in 1984 appointed by Queen Elizabeth II as the 23rd governor general since Canadian Confederation, on the recommendation of Prime Minister of Canada Pierre Trudeau, to replace Edward Schreyer as vicereine, and she occupied the post until succeeded by Ray Hnatyshyn in 1990. She was the first woman to serve as Canada's governor general and, while her appointment as the Queen's representative was initially and generally welcomed, Sauvé caused some controversy during her time as vicereine, mostly due to increased security around the office, as well as an anti-monarchist attitude towards the position.

On November 27, 1972, Sauvé was sworn into the Queen's Privy Council for Canada. She subsequently founded and worked with the Sauvé Foundation until her death, caused by Hodgkin's lymphoma, on January 26, 1993.

The highest trophy for the Canadian Ringette Championships, the major national competition for the sport of ringette, is named in her honour. Initially called the Jeanne Sauvé Cup, it was post-humously renamed the Jeanne Sauvé Memorial Cup.

== Early life, youth, and first career ==
Sauvé was born in the Fransaskois community of Prud'homme, Saskatchewan, to Charles Albert Benoît and Anna Vaillant, and three years later moved with them to Ottawa, where her family had previously lived. In Ottawa, her father would take her to see the bronze bust on Parliament Hill of Canada's first female Member of Parliament (MP), Agnes Macphail. Sauvé studied at Notre Dame du Rosaire Convent in Ottawa, becoming head of her class in her first year, and continued her education at the University of Ottawa, working for the government of Canada as a translator in order to pay her tuition. At the same time, Sauvé actively involved herself in student and political affairs; at the age of 20, she became the national president of the Young Catholic Students Group, which employed her in 1942, necessitating her move to Montreal.

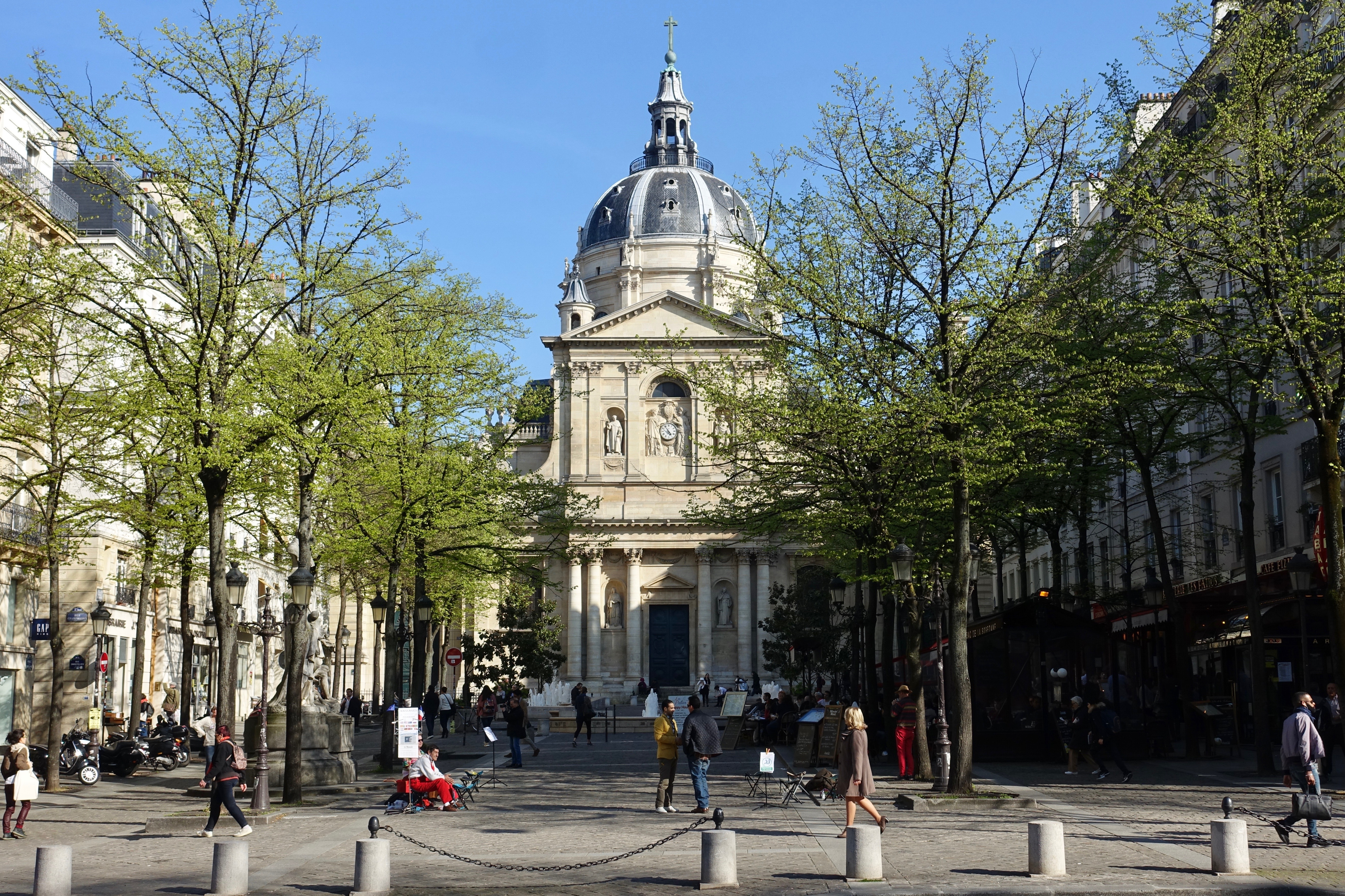
The Sorbonne in Paris, where Sauvé obtained her degree in French civilization

It was there that Sauvé met Maurice Sauvé, and the two married on September 24, 1948, the same year the couple moved to London; Maurice had obtained a scholarship to the London School of Economics, and Sauvé worked as a teacher and tutor. Two years later, they moved to Paris, where Sauvé was employed as the assistant to the director of the Youth Secretariat at UNESCO, and in 1951, she enrolled for one year at the Sorbonne, graduating with a degree in French civilization. Sauvé and her husband returned to Canada near the end of 1952, where the couple settled in Saint-Hyacinthe, Quebec, and in 1959 had one child, Jean-François. Sauvé then became a founding member of the Institute of Political Research and was hired as a journalist and broadcaster with the Canadian Broadcasting Corporation's French-language broadcaster, Radio-Canada.

After success on her first radio programme, Fémina, Sauvé was moved to CBC television and focused her efforts on covering political topics on both radio and television, in both English and French. She soon drew attention to herself and was frequently invited by her friend Gérard Pelletier as a panellist on the controversial show Les Idées en Marche, there revealing her left-wing political ideologies. This absorption of a woman into the traditionally male world of political journalism and commentary was unusual, yet Sauvé managed to be taken seriously, even being given her own television show, Opinions, which covered "such taboo subjects as teenage sex, parental authority, and student discipline". On air from 1956 to 1963, "it was the show that made Jeanne famous". However, Sauvé also attracted negative attention due to her husband's eventual elevation as a Crown minister; in a piece in The Globe and Mail, Progressive Conservative MP Louis-Joseph Pigeon expressed concern over the wife of a minister being paid "fabulous sums by the CBC", calling the circumstances a "shame and a scandal".

== Parliamentary career ==
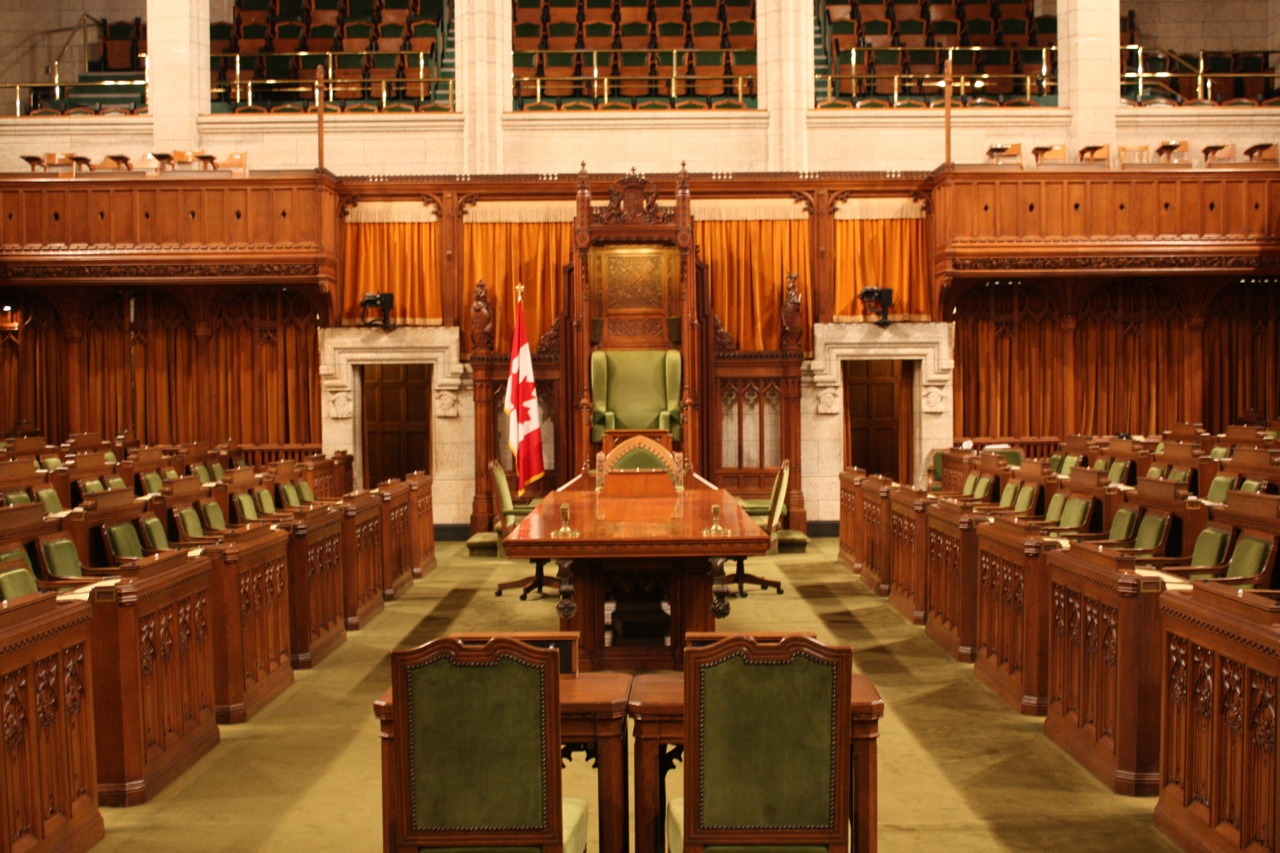
The House of Commons of Canada, where Sauvé served as a Member of Parliament and later Speaker of the House, sitting in the chair at the far centre

It was the Liberal Party that wooed Sauvé into politics, asking her to run as a candidate in the Montreal riding of Ahuntsic during the 1972 federal election. Though she found campaigning arduous, saying: "I felt uneasy for the first time in my life when I was campaigning ... I must say I had qualms about it myself", Sauvé won, becoming one of five female MPs. She was subsequently both sworn into the Queen's Privy Council and appointed as Minister of State for Science and Technology in the Cabinet chaired by Pierre Trudeau, thus becoming the first woman from Quebec to become a minister of the Crown and the sole female in that Cabinet. Sauvé ran again in the election two years later, re-winning Ahuntsic, and was given the environment portfolio until 1975, when she was appointed Minister of Communications.

In the 1979 election, Sauvé won the riding of Laval-des-Rapides, but the Liberals lost their majority in the commons to the Progressive Conservative Party; she thus lost her Cabinet position. She remained MP for her riding after the federal election of 1980, which saw both the Liberals returned to majority position.

=== Speaker of the House of Commons ===
Trudeau returned to position of prime minister in the 32nd Canadian Parliament, and selected Sauvé as his choice for the speaker of the House of Commons. Because she strongly desired to campaign for the "No" forces in the weeks leading up to Quebec's 1980 referendum on separation from Canada, Sauvé initially refused the offer to run for the non-partisan position. But she eventually acquiesced after Trudeau convinced her that she was the right person for the job and she received permission from the leaders of all the parties in the House of Commons to engage in the federalist campaign in Quebec. She became the first female Speaker of the House.

In her early days as speaker, Sauvé often made mistakes with the names of MPs or the ridings they represented—once calling on the Prime Minister as the "leader of the opposition"—and occasionally miscarried procedural rulings, which led to MPs addressing her with increasing curtness. Further, all 32 of the New Democratic Party MPs in the house walked out in protest of what they viewed as a bias on Sauvé's part; they felt she allowed Liberal MPs to ask more questions than those from any other party. In a CBC interview, Sauvé conceded that the NDP members may have been right that the Liberals may have been allowed more questions over two or three days, but, on the whole, each party received an equal number of opportunities. It was also speculated that MPs had taken to showboating for the television cameras that had recently been installed in the chamber.

Sauvé did, however, find success in implementing reforms that professionalised the speaker's tasks of managing expenses and staff for the House of Commons, cutting back on the excess bureaucracy, personnel, overtime waste, and costs she discovered upon her installation. Once the changes were made, Sauvé had reduced the commons' support personnel by 300 and saved $18 million out of the annual expenses, all of which, to some, actually improved overall service. Sauvé was lauded, by MPs and the media alike, for her courage in challenging the establishment. Other MPs, though, stated that she had gone too far and balked at the resulting inconveniences, such as having to clear their own plates in the commons cafeteria. At the same time, Sauvé also established the first daycare for Parliament Hill staff, MPs, and senators.

She also presided over debates on the constitution, dealing with filibusters and numerous points of order, as well as discussions over the proposed Energy Security Act, against which the loyal opposition mounted a counter-campaign that culminated in a two-week bell-ringing episode when the Conservatives' Whip refused to appear in the Commons to indicate that the opposition was ready for a vote. Despite pressure from the government that she intervene to break the deadlock, Sauvé maintained that it was up to the parties to resolve it themselves through negotiation.

== Governor General of Canada ==
Sauvé was the first female governor general in Canada's history, and only the second woman amongst all the Commonwealth realms—both previous and contemporary to the time—to assume the equivalent office, after Elmira Minita Gordon, who was in 1981 appointed Governor-General of Belize.

=== As governor general-designate ===
It was in December 1983 announced from the Office of the Prime Minister of Canada that Trudeau had put forward Sauvé's name to Queen Elizabeth II as his recommendation on who should succeed Edward Schreyer as governor general of Canada. In the national media, the reception was generally positive, with Sauvé's elegance, refined nature, and bilingualism viewed as an asset to such a posting, despite speculation regarding her ability to remain non-partisan, as would be expected of the vicereine. However, by January 15, of the following year Sauvé resigned as an MP, and thus as speaker, and two days later she was hospitalised; rumours circulated that it was due to cancer, but the official story was that she had contracted a respiratory virus, which was further complicated by an allergy to antibiotics.

Still, Queen Elizabeth II, by commission under the royal sign-manual and Great Seal of Canada, appointed on January 28, 1984, Trudeau's recommendation that she appoint Sauvé as her representative. However, the latter remained in hospital, and her illness only worsened, leading colleagues to believe that she would die, and the Canadian Press and CBC to draft preliminary obituaries. Sauvé did recover, and was released from care on March 3, though the illness had delayed her installation ceremony, which had been scheduled to take place that month. Sauvé remained secretive about the exact nature of the illness, and did not pay attention to rumours that she had developed Hodgkin's lymphoma, stating in interviews that it was a private matter, and that she was well enough to uphold her responsibilities.

=== In office ===
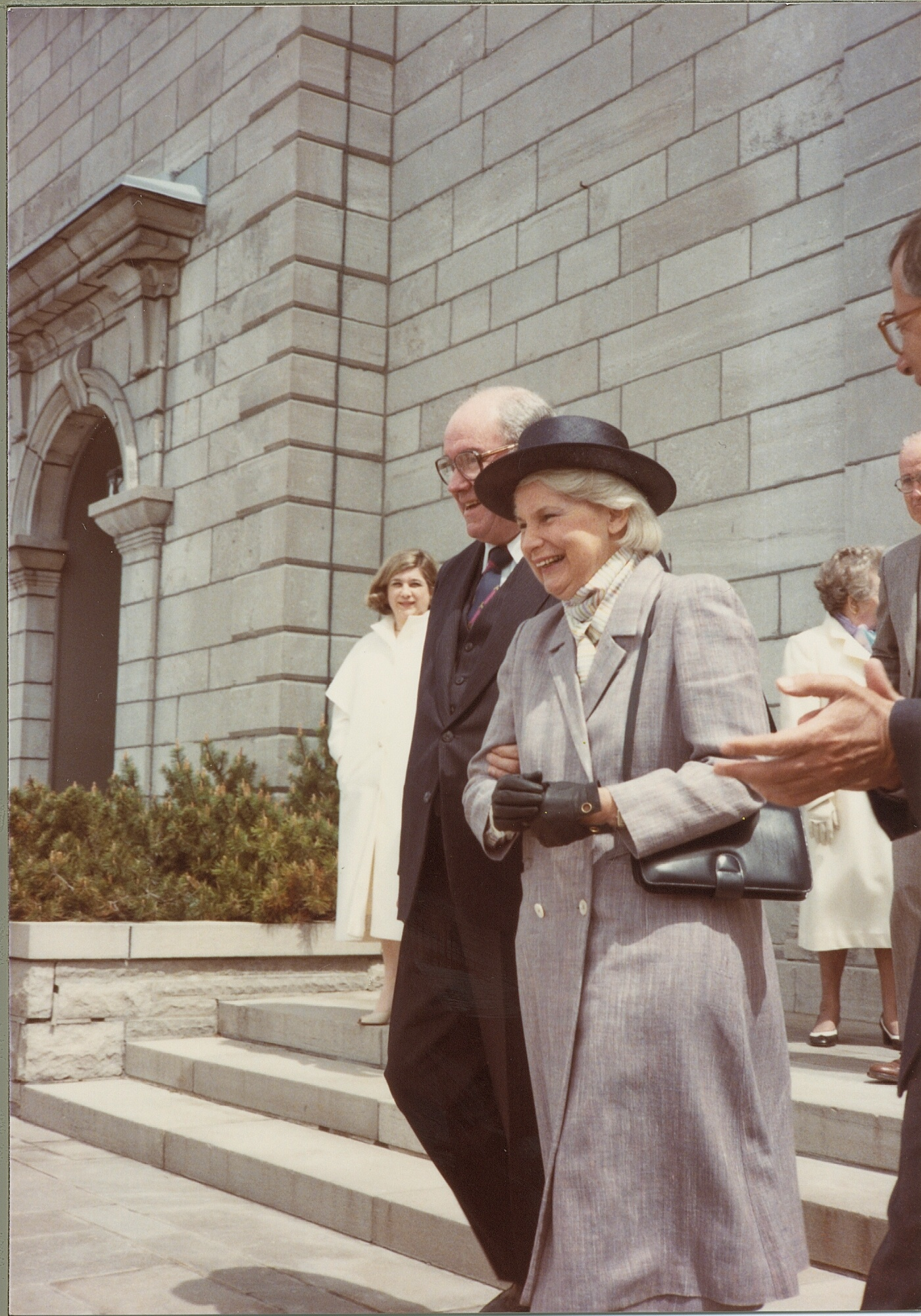
Sauvé in Ottawa, 1984

Sauvé was sworn in as governor general on May 14, 1984, in a ceremony in the Senate chamber, during which Trudeau said: "It is right and proper that Her Majesty should finally have a woman representative here", though stressing that the Queen had not appointed Sauvé simply because she was a woman. Almost immediately, Sauvé made it clear that she would use her time as governor general to promote issues surrounding youth and world peace, as well as that of national unity.

As governor general, Sauvé kept up to date with Cabinet papers and met every two weeks with her successive prime ministers. She would not speak openly about her relationship with these individuals, but there was reported friction between Sauvé and Brian Mulroney, whom she had appointed as prime minister in 1984. It was speculated Sauvé disapproved of the way Mulroney elevated the stature of his office with more presidential trappings and aura, as exemplified by his insistence that he alone greet U.S. President Ronald Reagan upon his arrival at Quebec City for the colloquially dubbed "Shamrock Summit". This was taken by the media as a snub against Sauvé who, as the head of state's direct representative, would otherwise have welcomed another head of state to Canada.

She did, however, greet members of the royal family, including the Queen and her husband, Prince Philip, Duke of Edinburgh; Queen Elizabeth The Queen Mother; and the Duke and Duchess of York. Prince Edward met with Sauvé at Rideau Hall on June 4, 1988, to present her with royal Letters Patent permitting the governor general to exercise the Queen's powers in respect of the granting of heraldic arms in Canada, leading to the eventual creation of the Canadian Heraldic Authority, of which Sauvé was the first head. Among foreign visitors welcomed by Sauvé were King Carl XVI Gustav of Sweden, Queen Beatrix of the Netherlands, King Hussein of Jordan, Pope John Paul II, Secretary-General of the United Nations Javier Pérez de Cuéllar, French President François Mitterrand, Chinese President Li Xiannian, Romanian President Nicolae Ceauşescu, Mother Teresa, and, eventually, President Reagan. A number of these state visits were reciprocated when Sauvé travelled to represent the Queen in Italy, the Vatican, China, Thailand, France, Uruguay, and Brazil.

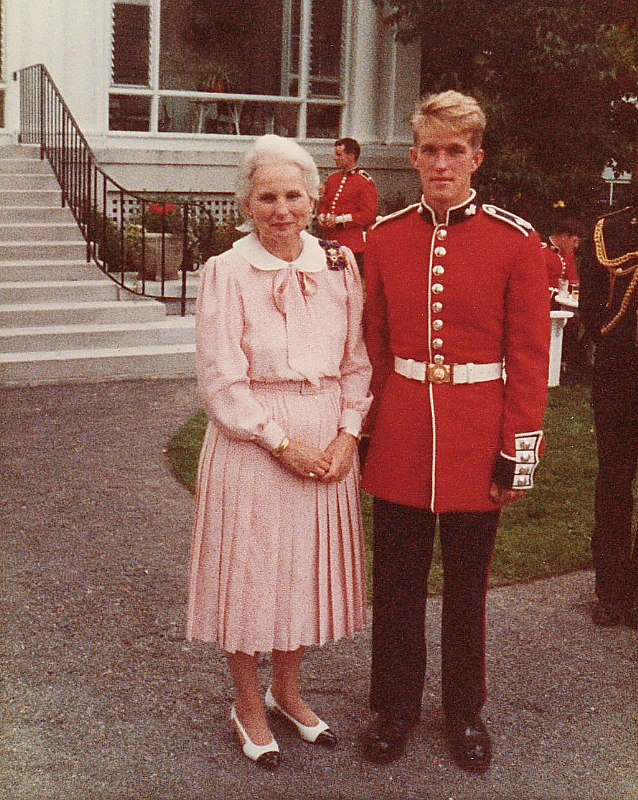
Sauvé (left) at a garden party for the Ceremonial Guard and Governor General's Foot Guards at Rideau Hall, 1985

Also in her capacity as governor general, in 1986 Sauvé accepted, on behalf of the "People of Canada", the Nansen Medal and, two years later, opened the XV Olympic Winter Games in Calgary, Alberta. One of her favourite events to host was the annual Christmas party for the Ottawa Boys & Girls Club and its French-language counterpart, the Patro d'Ottawa; the children came to Rideau Hall to visit with Santa Claus and attended a lunch in the Tent Room. Sauvé personally hosted and wore a paper party hat to celebrate the special occasion.

Ironically, as with the speculations about Sauvé's standing in protocol vis-a-vis Mulroney, she was herself accused of elevating her position above its traditional place; she was criticised for her own presidentialisation of the viceregal post, with pundits at the time saying she occupied "Republican Hall". For instance, it was revealed that Sauvé's staff had meddled in Lieutenant Governor of Saskatchewan Frederick Johnson's plans to host a dinner at Government House in Regina, at which the Governor General was to be a guest. Further, municipal event organisers were told that singing of God Save the Queen, the Canadian royal anthem, was not allowed and the loyal toast to the Queen was to be replaced with a toast to Sauvé, all of which not only disregarded precedent but also grated on prairie sensitivities.

In her final address in office, at Christmas, 1989, some of Sauvé's words were perceived as veiled warning about the failure of the Meech Lake Accord and she was criticised for this suspected breach of neutrality. The Premier of Newfoundland at the time, Clyde Wells, said it was "inappropriate for the Crown to be intruding in political affairs that way" and Bill Dawson, a law professor at the University of Western Ontario, described Sauvé's use of the word pact as "injudicious". This was a subject on which Sauvé and the Queen agreed, as the Queen had also publicly expressed on October 22 and 23, 1987, her personal support for the accord and received criticism from its opponents. Sauvé, though, always held that she had been speaking about Canadian unity in general and not the Meech Lake Accord in particular, or any side of the debate around it.

=== Legacy ===
During her time as governor general, Sauvé established in commemoration of her state visit to Brazil the Governor General Jeanne Sauvé Fellowship, awarded each year to a Brazilian graduate student in Canadian studies. She also created two awards for students entering the field of special education and subsequently created the Sauvé Foundation in 2003 "to develop the leadership potential of promising youth from around the world", which was dedicated to the cause of youth excellence in Canada and is today headed by Jean-François. The Sauvé Scholars Program has brought groups of up to fourteen young people with demonstrated leadership potential each year to Montreal, where they attend classes at McGill University, work on individual projects and "enlarge their understanding of the world". The Sauvé Scholars, who have come from 44 countries around the world, enjoy a unique residential program at Maison Jeanne Sauvé, which constitutes a key part of their experience.

For sporting endeavours, Sauvé formed the Jeanne Sauvé Trophy, for the world cup championship in women's field hockey, and the Jeanne Sauvé Fair Play Award, to recognise national amateur athletes who best demonstrate fair play and non-violence in sport. Further, Sauvé encouraged a safer society in Canada by establishing the Governor General's Award for Safety in the Workplace.

In 1983, then President of the national organization for the sport of ringette in Canada, Ringette Canada, Betty Shields, had the trophy for the Canadian Ringette Championships named in her honour. The trophy was initiated in December 1984 and was first presented at the 1985 Canadian Ringette Championships in Dollard-des-Ormeaux, Québec. While Sauvé was alive the trophy was called the Jeanne Sauvé Cup. Post-humously it was renamed the Jeanne Sauvé Memorial Cup, which remains the trophy's namesake today.

Though there was some criticism in the final evaluations of her performance as governor general, mostly for a perceived aloofness and sense of self-importance—which her closing of the Rideau Hall estate to the public came to symbolise—Sauvé was also described as having been elegant, charming, and a person who could mingle well with common Canadians—especially children—while also maintaining a sense of the dignity of state. She was said to have enjoyed both entertaining and ceremony, two necessary parts of the role of the Queen's representative. However, she was pointed out unfavourably by Canadian monarchists for her republican attitudes, as illustrated in her stated opinion that the monarchy should be abolished. (Note: Sauvé said: "Mais absolument, on devrait abolir la monarchie au Canada!": "But absolutely, the Monarchy must be abolished in Canada!")

== Retirement and death ==
After departing Rideau Hall for the last time as governor general in 1990, Sauvé and her husband returned to Montreal, where she continued to work with the Sauvé Foundation. Only two years later, however, Maurice died, and Sauvé followed him on January 26, 1993, after a long battle with Hodgkin's lymphoma. The couple were both interred in Notre Dame des Neiges Cemetery in Montreal, and, one year following her death, Canada Post issued a postage stamp bearing an image of Sauvé.

== Titles, styles, honours, and arms ==
=== Titles ===
Viceregal styles of Jeanne Sauvé (1984–1990)
- Reference style: Her Excellency the Right Honourable; Son Excellence la très honorable
- Spoken style: Your Excellency; Votre Excellence

- November 27, 1972 – May 14, 1984: The Honourable Jeanne Sauvé
- May 14, 1984 – January 28, 1990: Her Excellency the Right Honourable Jeanne Sauvé, Governor General and Commander-in-Chief in and over Canada
- January 28, 1990 – January 26, 1993: The Right Honourable Jeanne Sauvé

=== Honours ===
Sauvé's personal awards and decorations include:

| Ribbon | Description | Notes |
| | Order of Canada (CC) | Appointed Extraordinary Companion 14 May 1984 |
| | Order of Military Merit (CMM) | Appointed Extraordinary Commander (CMM) on 14 May 1984 |
| | Order of St John (KStJ) | Appointed Knight 14 May 1984 |
| | Canadian Centennial Medal | Decoration awarded in 1967 |
| | Queen Elizabeth II Silver Jubilee Medal | Decoration awarded in 1977; Canadian version |
| | 125th Anniversary of the Confederation of Canada Medal | Decoration awarded in 1992 |
| | Canadian Forces' Decoration (CD) | As per appointment, 14 May 1984 |

Appointments

- (Canada) January 4, 1973 – January 15, 1984: Member of Parliament (MP)
- November 27, 1972 – January 26, 1993: Member of the Queen's Privy Council for Canada (PC)
- May 14, 1984 – January 28, 1990: Chancellor and Principal Companion of the Order of Canada (CC)
  - January 28, 1990 – January 26, 1993: Companion of the Order of Canada (CC)
- (Canada) May 14, 1984 – January 28, 1990: Chancellor and Commander of the Order of Military Merit (CMM)
  - January 28, 1990 – January 26, 1993: Commander of the Order of Military Merit (CMM)
- May 14, 1984 – January 28, 1990: Dame of Justice, Prior, and Chief Officer in Canada of the Most Venerable Order of the Hospital of Saint John of Jerusalem (DStJ)
  - January 28, 1990 – January 26, 1993: Dame of Justice of the Most Venerable Order of the Hospital of Saint John of Jerusalem (DStJ)
- May 14, 1984 – January 28, 1990: Chief Scout of Canada
- 1984 – January 26, 1993: Honorary Member of the Royal Military College of Canada Club

Medals

- (Canada) 1967: Canadian Centennial Medal
- (Canada) 1977: Queen Elizabeth II Silver Jubilee Medal
- (Canada) May 14, 1984: Canadian Forces' Decoration (CD)
- 1992: Commemorative Medal for the 125th Anniversary of the Confederation of Canada

Foreign honours

- (France) 1989: Médaille de la Chancellerie des universités de Paris

==== Honorary military appointments ====
- (Canada) May 14, 1984 – January 28, 1990: Colonel of the Governor General's Horse Guards
- (Canada) May 14, 1984 – January 28, 1990: Colonel of the Governor General's Foot Guards
- (Canada) May 14, 1984 – January 28, 1990: Colonel of the Canadian Grenadier Guards

==== Honorary degrees ====
- (Ontario) 1986: Queen's University, Doctor of Laws (LLD)
- (Thailand) 1987: Chulalongkorn University, Doctor of Political Science (DPSci)
- (Saskatchewan) 1991: University of Regina, Doctor of Laws (LLD)

==== Honorific eponyms ====
Awards

- Alberta: Jeanne Sauvé Undergraduate Scholarship, University of Alberta, Edmonton
- Canada: Jeanne Sauvé Fair Play Award
- Canada: Governor General Jeanne Sauvé Fellowship
- Canada: Jeanne Sauvé Memorial Cup
- Canada: Jeanne Sauvé Trophy

Geographic locations

- Quebec: Jeanne-Sauvé Park, Montreal
- Quebec: Jeanne-Sauvé District, Outremont

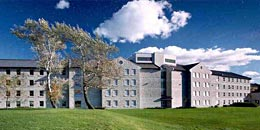
Fort Sauvé, Royal Military College of Canada

Buildings

- Ontario: Fort Sauvé, Kingston

Schools

- Manitoba: Collège Jeanne-Sauvé, Winnipeg
- Ontario: École publique Jeanne-Sauvé, Sudbury
- Ontario: Ecole Jeanne-Sauvé, Orléans
- Ontario: Jeanne Sauvé Catholic School, Stratford
- Ontario: Jeanne Sauvé French Immersion Public School, London
- Ontario: Jeanne Sauvé French Immersion Public School, St. Catharines
- Ontario: Jeanne Sauvé French Immersion Public School, Oshawa

Organisations

- Ontario: Jeanne Sauvé Family Service
- Quebec: Sauvé Foundation
- Quebec: Jeanne Sauvé House

Events

- Quebec: Jeanne Sauvé Lecture Series

=== Arms ===
Coat of arms of Jeanne Sauvé
| Notes Though Sauvé had been granted a coat of arms in 1985 by the College of Arms, these were augmented by the Canadian Heraldic Authority upon its formation in 1988. Adopted November 19, 1988 Crest Upon a Helm mantled Azure doubled Or, on a Wreath Or and Azure alighting within a circlet composed alternately of Maple Leaves Gules and Fleurs-de-Lys Or a Dove wings elevated and addorsed holding in its beak a sprig of Olive both proper Escutcheon Azure the Mace of the House of Commons of Canada Or in bend between in chief an Eagle displayed Or bearing in its beak a bolt of lightning Gules and in base a Lion passant guardant Or imperially crowned proper holding in the dexter paw a Maple Leaf Gules fimbriated Or Supporters On either side a Doe proper each gorged with a collar Argent pendant therefrom a Roundel barry wavy Argent and Vert Motto VIS ET TOLERANTIA (Strength and tolerance) Orders The ribbon and insignia of a Companion of the Order of Canada; DESIDERANTES MELIOREM PATRIAM (They desire a better country) Symbolism The dove bearing an olive branch symbolises peace, while the maple leaves and fleurs de lys on the coronet in which the dove sits are representative of Sauvé's French Canadian roots. The white tailed deer hearken to the symbols of Saskatchewan, where Sauvé was born, and, on the shield they support, the phoenix represents Sauvé's resurgence from cancer, the lightning bolt her career in television and radio, the mace stands for her time as Speaker of the House of Commons, and the crowned lion—the crest of the Royal Coat of Arms of Canada—indicates that Sauvé served as the viceregal representative of the Canadian monarch. Hanging below the shield is the insignia of a Companion of the Order of Canada on the bow typically used by female members of the order. Previous versions Crest: upon a Helm mantled Azure doubled Or, on a Wreath Or and Azure alighting within a circlet composed of Maple Leaves Gules a Dove wings elevated and addorsed holding in its beak a sprig of Olive both proper; Escutcheon: Azure the Mace of the House of Commons of Canada Or in bend between in chief an Eagle displayed Or and in base a Royal Crown proper Or; Supporters: on either side a Doe proper, Dexter applied with a Fleur de Lys Azure, Sinister applied with a Maple Leaf Gules |

== Archives ==
There is a Jeanne Sauvé fonds at Library and Archives Canada.

== See also ==
- List of elected or appointed female heads of state
- Women in Canadian politics

== Notes ==
Parliament of Canada
| Preceded by Jean-Léo Rochon | Member of Parliament for Ahuntsic; October 30, 1972 – May 22, 1979 | Constituency abolished |
| New constituency | Member of Parliament for Laval-des-Rapides; May 22, 1979 – January 15, 1984 | Succeeded by Raymond Garneau |
| Preceded by James Jerome | Speaker of the House of Commons; April 14, 1980 – January 15, 1984 | Succeeded by Cyril Lloyd Francis |
Cabinet offices
| Preceded by Jack Davis | Minister of the Environment; August 8, 1974 – December 5, 1975 | Succeeded by Roméo LeBlanc |
| Preceded by Otto Lang; Acting | Minister of Communications; December 5, 1975 – June 4, 1979 | Succeeded by David MacDonald |
Government offices
| Preceded by Edward Schreyer | Governor General of Canada; May 14, 1984 – January 29, 1990 | Succeeded by Ray Hnatyshyn |
