= 1907 in Canada =

- Decades: 1880s; 1890s; 1900s; 1910s; 1920s
- See also: History of Canada; Timeline of Canadian history; List of years in Canada

Events from the year 1907 in Canada.

== Incumbents ==
=== Crown ===
- Monarch – Edward VII

=== Federal government ===
- Governor General – Albert Grey, 4th Earl Grey
- Prime Minister – Wilfrid Laurier
- Chief Justice – Charles Fitzpatrick (Quebec)
- Parliament – 10th

=== Provincial governments ===
==== Lieutenant governors ====
- Lieutenant Governor of Alberta – George Hedley Vicars Bulyea
- Lieutenant Governor of British Columbia – James Dunsmuir
- Lieutenant Governor of Manitoba – Daniel Hunter McMillan
- Lieutenant Governor of New Brunswick – Jabez Bunting Snowball (until February 24) then Lemuel John Tweedie (from March 6)
- Lieutenant Governor of Nova Scotia – Duncan Cameron Fraser
- Lieutenant Governor of Ontario – William Mortimer Clark
- Lieutenant Governor of Prince Edward Island – Donald Alexander MacKinnon
- Lieutenant Governor of Quebec – Louis-Amable Jetté
- Lieutenant Governor of Saskatchewan – Amédée Forget

==== Premiers ====
- Premier of Alberta – Alexander Cameron Rutherford
- Premier of British Columbia – Richard McBride
- Premier of Manitoba – Rodmond Roblin
- Premier of New Brunswick – Lemuel John Tweedie (until March 6) then William Pugsley (March 6 to May 31) then Clifford William Robinson
- Premier of Nova Scotia – George Henry Murray
- Premier of Ontario – James Whitney
- Premier of Prince Edward Island – Arthur Peters
- Premier of Quebec – Lomer Gouin
- Premier of Saskatchewan – Thomas Walter Scott

=== Territorial governments ===
==== Commissioners ====
- Commissioner of Yukon – John T. Lithgow (acting) (until June 17) then Alexander Henderson
- Gold Commissioner of Yukon – F.X. Gosselin (from June 17)
- Commissioner of Northwest Territories – Frederick D. White

== Events ==
- March 6 – William Pugsley becomes premier of New Brunswick, replacing Lemuel John Tweedie
- May 24 – Boer War Memorial (Montreal) unveiled
- May 30 – King Edward VII grants the Coat of Arms of Alberta
- May 31 – Clifford Robinson becomes premier of New Brunswick, replacing William Pugsley
- August 24 – Part of the under-construction Quebec Bridge collapses in Quebec City killing 75 construction workers and injuring 11.
- September 7
  - An anti-Asian riot in Vancouver attacks Chinatown
  - Alexander Grant MacKay is elected leader of the Ontario Liberal Party
- September 14 – Jasper Forest Park – later named Jasper National Park – is established.

=== Full date unknown ===
- The National Council for Women demands "equal pay for equal work"
- The world's first rotary telephone came into use at Sydney Mines, Nova Scotia
- The first Sobeys opens in Stellarton, Nova Scotia

== Births ==
=== January to June ===
- January 14 – Georges-Émile Lapalme, politician (d.1985)
- January 26 – Hans Selye, endocrinologist (d.1982)
- February 9 – Harold Scott MacDonald Coxeter, geometer (d.2003)
- March 20 – Hugh MacLennan, author and professor of English (d.1990)
- March 24 – Paul Sauvé, lawyer, soldier, politician and 17th Premier of Quebec (d.1960)
- April 16 – Joseph-Armand Bombardier, inventor, businessman and founder of Bombardier Inc. (d.1964)
- April 17 – Louis-Philippe-Antoine Bélanger, politician (d.1989)
- June 19 – Clarence Wiseman, Salvation Army general (d.1985)

=== July to December ===
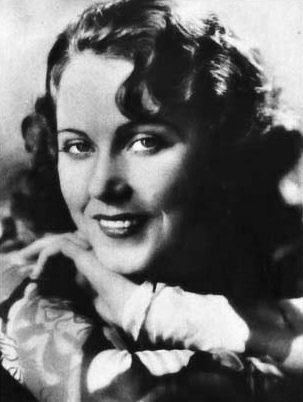
Fay Wray – Publicity photo, ca. 1930

- July 6 – George Stanley, historian, author, soldier, teacher, public servant and designer of the current Canadian flag (d. 2002)
- August 5 – Herman Linder, rodeoist
- August 24 – Alfred Belzile, politician and farmer
- September 3 – Andrew Brewin, lawyer and politician (d. 1983)
- September 11 – Cécile Chabot, poet and illustrator (d. 1990)
- September 15 – Fay Wray, actress (d.2004)
- October 20 – Carl Goldenberg, lawyer, arbitrator, mediator and Senator (d. 1996)
- November 19 – Frederick Thomas Armstrong, politician (d. 1990)
- November 21 – Christie Harris, children's author (d. 2002)
- December 12 – Fleurette Beauchamp-Huppé, pianist, soprano and teacher (d. 2007)

=== Unknown ===
- Edythe Shuttleworth, mezzo-soprano (d.1983)

== Deaths ==
=== January to June ===
- January 1 – William Pearce Howland, politician (b.1811)
- January 25 – Andrew George Blair, politician and 6th Premier of New Brunswick (b.1844)
- January 31 – Timothy Eaton, businessman and founder of Eaton's (b.1834)
- March 3 – Oronhyatekha, Mohawk physician and scholar (b.1841)
- March 8 – Edward Cochrane, politician (b.1834)
- March 20 – Louis Adolphe Billy, politician and lawyer (b.1834)
- April 6 – William Henry Drummond, poet (b.1854)
- May 24 – Frederick William Lewis, politician.
- June 12 – John Waldie, politician (b.1833)

=== July to December ===
- August 10 – James Brien, politician and physician (b.1848)
- September 26 – Alexander Gunn, politician (b.1828)
- October 10 – Cassie Chadwick, fraudster (b.1857)
- October 13 – Harvey William Burk, politician and farmer (b.1822)
