= 1910 in Canada =

- Decades: 1890s; 1900s; 1910s; 1920s; 1930s
- See also: History of Canada; Timeline of Canadian history; List of years in Canada

Events from the year 1910 in Canada.

== Incumbents ==
=== Crown ===
- Monarch – Edward VII (until May 6), then George V

=== Federal government ===
- Governor General – Albert Grey, 4th Earl Grey
- Prime Minister – Wilfrid Laurier
- Chief Justice – Charles Fitzpatrick (Quebec)
- Parliament – 11th

=== Provincial governments ===
==== Lieutenant governors ====
- Lieutenant Governor of Alberta – George Hedley Vicars Bulyea
- Lieutenant Governor of British Columbia – Thomas Wilson Paterson
- Lieutenant Governor of Manitoba – Daniel Hunter McMillan
- Lieutenant Governor of New Brunswick – Lemuel John Tweedie
- Lieutenant Governor of Nova Scotia – Duncan Cameron Fraser (until September 27) then James Drummond McGregor
- Lieutenant Governor of Ontario – John Morison Gibson
- Lieutenant Governor of Prince Edward Island – Donald Alexander MacKinnon (until June 1) then Benjamin Rogers
- Lieutenant Governor of Quebec – Charles Alphonse Pantaléon Pelletier
- Lieutenant Governor of Saskatchewan – Amédée Forget (until October 5) then George William Brown

==== Premiers ====
- Premier of Alberta – Alexander Cameron Rutherford (until May 26) then Arthur Sifton
- Premier of British Columbia – Richard McBride
- Premier of Manitoba – Rodmond Roblin
- Premier of New Brunswick – John Douglas Hazen
- Premier of Nova Scotia – George Henry Murray
- Premier of Ontario – James Whitney
- Premier of Prince Edward Island – Francis Haszard
- Premier of Quebec – Lomer Gouin
- Premier of Saskatchewan – Thomas Walter Scott

=== Territorial governments ===
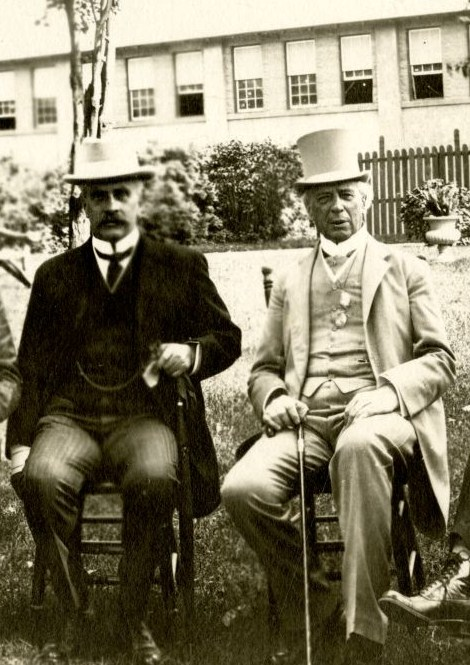
Prime Ministers Robert Borden and Wilfrid Laurier. At the time of this photo, in 1912, Borden was Prime Minister of Canada, and Laurier was Leader of the Opposition.

==== Commissioners ====
- Commissioner of Yukon – Alexander Henderson
- Gold Commissioner of Yukon – F.X. Gosselin
- Commissioner of Northwest Territories – Frederick D. White

== Events ==
- January 3 – Happiness and contentment are found from one end of Canada to the other – headline in The Times (page 5)
- January 10 – The Laurier government introduces the Naval Service Act creating a Canadian navy to great controversy. The bill would end up alienating most of Laurier supporters and lead to his defeat in the 1911 election.
- January 10 – Le Devoir first published
- January 21 – A Canadian Pacific Railway passenger train derails and crashes into a bridge over the Spanish River near Nairn in Sudbury District, Ontario. Between 43 and 70 people are killed in what was at the time the worst disaster in Canadian Pacific history, and one of the worst railway disasters in Canadian history.
- March 5 – 65 railway maintenance workers, over half of them Japanese, are killed in an avalanche at Rogers Pass, British Columbia while trying to clear the Canadian Pacific Railway's transcontinental mainline. It is the worst disaster in Canadian Pacific history.
- May 4 – The Royal Canadian Navy is created after the Naval Service Act passes
- May 6 – Edward VII dies and is succeeded by George V
- May 26 – Arthur Sifton becomes premier of Alberta, replacing Alexander Rutherford
- July 31 – British murderer Dr. Crippen is caught in Quebec City
- December 9 – a coal mine explosion at Bellevue, Alberta, kills 31

== Sport ==
- January 5/7 – Ottawa HC defeats Galt HC 15 goals to 4 to win the first Stanley Cup challenge in Ottawa's Dey's Arena
- January 18/20 – Ottawa HC defeats Edmonton HC 21 goals to 11 to win the second Stanley Cup challenge in Ottawa's Dey's Arena
- March 12 – Montreal Wanderers defeat Berlin Dutchmen 7 goals to 3 to win the final Stanley Cup challenge in Montreal's Jubilee Rink
- September 13 – Regina Rugby Club (Saskatchewan Roughriders) are established
- November 26 – The University of Toronto Varsity Blues defeat the Hamilton Tigers 16 to 7 to win the 2nd Grey Cup, played at Hamilton's A.A.A. Grounds

== Arts and literature ==
=== New Books ===
- Anne of Avonlea – Lucy Maud Montgomery
- Ednyfed Fychan – William Williams
- Practical Political Economy – Stephen Leacock

== Births ==
=== January to June ===
- January 4 – Arthur Villeneuve, painter (d. 1990)
- February 2 – Andrew McKeller, astrophysicist
- February 5 – Charles Philippe Leblond, pioneer of cell biology and stem cell research (d. 2007)
- February 27 – Robert Bryce, civil servant (d. 1997)
- May 4 – Arsène Gagné, Quebec politician (d. 1964)
- May 30 – Keir Clark, Prince Edward Island politician (d. 2010)
- June 17 – George Hees, politician and minister (d. 1996)
- June 26 – Munroe Bourne, swimmer (d. 1992)

=== July to December ===
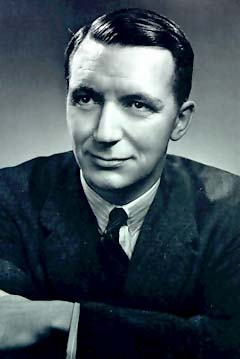
James Coyne

- July 2 – Lorne Carr, hockey player (d. 2007)
- July 17 – James Elliott Coyne, second Governor of the Bank of Canada
- July 19 – Jean Wilson, speed-skater
- July 29 – Norman Fawcett, politician (d. 1997)
- August 13 – Gwendolyn Ringwood, playwright
- August 18 – Robert Winters, politician and businessman (d. 1969)
- August 26 – Jessie Gray, surgeon (d. 1978)
- September 10 – Harry Thode, geochemist, nuclear chemist and academic administrator (d. 1997)
- September 21 – Anne Wilkinson, poet (d. 1961)
- October 8 – Ray Lewis, track and field athlete, Olympic bronze medallist, first Canadian-born black Olympic medallist (d. 2003)
- October 13 – Otto Joachim, German-born composer (d. 2010)
- October 21 – Pauline Mills McGibbon, politician and 22nd Lieutenant-Governor of Ontario (d. 2001)
- October 27 – Jack Carson, actor (d. 1963)
- November 14 – Michael Starr, politician and first Canadian cabinet minister of Ukrainian descent (d. 2000)

=== Full date unknown ===
- James Cameron, writer
- Al Clouston, storyteller, humourist and author (d. 2004)
- Leo Landreville, politician and judge implicated in the Northern Ontario Natural Gas scandal (d. 1996)

== Deaths ==
- February 2 – George Murdoch, politician and 1st mayor of Calgary (b.1850)
- February 9 – George Barnard Baker, lawyer, politician and Senator (b.1834)
- February 15 – Joseph-Élisée Beaudet, businessman and politician (b.1834)
- February 26 – Adelaide Hoodless, educational reformer who founded the Women's Institute (b.1857)
- May 6 – Edward VII, King of Canada (b.1841)
- June 7 – Goldwin Smith, historian and journalist (b.1823)
- June 9 – Charles Braithwaite, politician and agrarian leader (b.1850)
- September 2 – Hector Fabre, lawyer, journalist, diplomat and senator (b.1834)
