= 1834 in Canada =

- Decades: 1810s; 1820s; 1830s; 1840s; 1850s
- See also: History of Canada; Timeline of Canadian history; List of years in Canada

Events from the year 1834 in Canada.

== Incumbents ==
- Monarch: William IV

=== Federal government ===
- Parliament of Lower Canada: 14th (until October 9)
- Parliament of Upper Canada: 11th (until March 6)

=== Governors ===
- Governor of the Canadas: Robert Milnes
- Governor of New Brunswick: George Stracey Smyth
- Governor of Nova Scotia: John Coape Sherbrooke
- Commodore-Governor of Newfoundland: Richard Goodwin Keats
- Governor of Prince Edward Island: Charles Douglass Smith

== Events ==
=== January to June ===
- January – King William IV appoints an arbitrator to settle questions regarding customs dues between the Canadas.
- January – The King announces that he will not make the Legislative Council an elected body, as it would be inconsistent with the monarchy, but that he will favour measures for the Council's independence.
- January – Thomas Spring Rice, the Secretary of State for War and the Colonies writes "If coming events should constrain the British Legislature to interpose its supreme authority to appease the internal dissensions of the Colony, it would then, indeed, become my duty to submit for the consideration of Parliament, some modifications of the charters of the Canadas, not however, for introducing institutions inconsistent with monarchy, but to preserve and cement their connection with the Mother Country, adhering ever to the spirit of the British Constitution, and confining within their legitimate bounds the rights and privileges of His Majesty's subjects."
- January 23 – The Chateau St. Louis (Quebec) is burned.
- February 17 – The Ninety-Two Resolutions are passed by the Legislative Assembly of Lower Canada. The complaints relate, chiefly, to nominations of Councillors, partiality in filling offices, of which 47 are alleged to have been distributed among 525,000 Frenchmen, against 157 higher positions, among 75,000 of British origin.
  - Speaking in the House upon the Ninety-Two Resolutions, which he frames and Mr. Bedard moves, Louis-Joseph Papineau says "It is certain that, before long, the whole of America will be republicanized. If a change be necessary in our present constitution, it is to be undertaken in view of such a conjuncture as I have just mentioned. Would it be a crime, were I to demand that it should? The members of the House are all answerable to their constituents for whatever decisions they may come to, in this regard. And, even though the soldiery should slaughter them for it, they ought not to hesitate, for one moment, to pronounce for any change which they consider beneficial to their country."
  - Mr. Neilson replies: "The American revolutionists and the British Liberals contended for the maintenance of franchises already acquired; we oppositionists are reaching out our hands for freedom which we never possessed. The Resolutions can not be justified, for they favour the refusal of supplies, without which there would be no means of defraying the expense of governing the Province."
- March 6 – Incorporation of Toronto, heretofore York, Upper Canada.
- William Lyon Mackenzie elected first mayor of the city of Toronto.
- March 8 – The Saint-Jean-Baptiste Society, an institution in Quebec dedicated to the protection of Quebec francophone interests and to the promotion of Quebec Sovereignism, is founded.

=== July to December ===
- July 31 – At midnight July 31, slavery comes to an end in all British territories, including British North America. To honour this important event, August 1 is celebrated as Emancipation Day in Windsor, Ontario, and elsewhere.
- December 9 – Foundation of the "Canadian Alliance Society" in Upper Canada at Toronto.
- Before a committee of the British Commons, Hon. Edward Ellice suggests remedies for troubles in Canada.

=== Full date unknown ===
- A majority of the Assembly call for Lord Aylmer's impeachment for maladministration, and invite Daniel O'Connell and others to assist them. The Council and British Canadians counter-petition. The Assembly omit voting supplies.
- Adopting revolutionary tactics, Papineau advises wearing homespun cloth and buying nothing British, in order to diminish misused revenues. Bankstocks being of British ownership, he advises a general demand of gold for banknotes.
- Samuel Lount elected to Assembly along with William Lyon Mackenzie and a Reform majority.

== Parliaments and Assemblies ==
- 14th Parliament of Lower Canada
- 11th Parliament of Upper Canada
- 14th General Assembly of Nova Scotia
- 10th New Brunswick Legislative Assembly
- 13th General Assembly of Prince Edward Island

== Arts and literature ==
- Song Ô Canada! mon pays, mes amours by George-Étienne Cartier.

== Births ==
=== January to March ===
- January 1 – Edward Cochrane, politician (died 1907)
- January 4 – Alexander Cameron, physician and politician (died 1917)
- January 8 – Timothy Coughlin, farmer and politician (died 1912)
- January 17 – Hannah Maynard, photographer
- January 20 – William Carpenter Bompas, Church of England clergyman, bishop and missionary (died 1906)
- January 29 – George Barnard Baker, lawyer, politician and Senator (died 1910)
- February 14 – George Ralph Richardson Cockburn, educator and politician (died 1912)
- March – Timothy Eaton, businessman and founder of Eaton's (died 1907)
- March 3 – Colin MacDougall, politician and lawyer (died 1901)
- March 8 – Thomas Christie, physician, professor and politician (died 1902)
- March 19 – Auguste Achintre, journalist and essayist (died 1886)

=== April to June ===
- April 21 – William Elliott, farmer, merchant and politician (died 1888)
- April 21 – Erastus Wiman, journalist and businessman (died 1904)
- May 7 – John Herbert Turner, politician and Premier of British Columbia (died 1923)
- June 6 – Abram William Lauder, lawyer and politician (died 1884)

=== July to September ===
- July 27 – Donald Farquharson, politician and Premier of Prince Edward Island (died 1903)
- August 7 – Sévère Rivard, lawyer, politician and 17th Mayor of Montreal (died 1888)
- August 9 – Hector Fabre, lawyer, journalist, diplomat and Senator (died 1910)
- August 12 – William Donahue, merchant and politician (died 1892)
- August 25 – Anson Dodge, lumber dealer and politician (died 1918)
- September 12 – Daniel Woodley Prowse, lawyer, politician, judge, historian and essayist (died 1914)
- September 16 – Robert Simpson, businessman and founder of Simpsons (died 1897)
- September 21 – Désiré Olivier Bourbeau, politician and merchant (died 1900)
- September 27 – Charles Fleetford Sise, businessman (died 1918)

=== October to December ===
- October 4 – Ward Bowlby, lawyer and politician, reeve of Berlin, Ontario (died 1917)
- October 13 – Louis Adolphe Billy, politician and lawyer (died 1907)
- November 7 – Ernest Gagnon, folklorist (died 1915)
- November 11 – Richard Butler, editor, publisher, journalist and U.S. vice-consul (died 1925)
- November 13 – William Doran, mayor of Hamilton, Ontario (died 1903)
- November 15 – George Anthony Walkem, jurist, politician and 3rd and 5th Premier of British Columbia (died 1908)
- November 16 – Georges-Isidore Barthe, lawyer, publisher, journalist and politician (died 1900)
- November 17 – George Cox, mayor of Ottawa (died 1909)
- November 26 – Joseph Brunet, politician and businessman (died 1904)
- December 14 – Thomas Bain, politician and Speaker of the House of Commons of Canada (died 1915)

=== Full date unknown ===
- Joseph-Élisée Beaudet, businessman and politician (died 1910)
- James Cunningham, merchant and politician (died 1925)

== Deaths ==
- May 24 – John Saunders, soldier, lawyer, politician and Chief Justice of New Brunswick (born 1754)
- August 12 or August 13 – Peter Rindisbacher, painter (born 1806)
- September 6 – William Dummer Powell, lawyer, judge and politician (born 1755)
- September 8 – William Black, Methodist minister (born 1760)
