= 1908 in Canada =

- Decades: 1880s; 1890s; 1900s; 1910s; 1920s
- See also: History of Canada; Timeline of Canadian history; List of years in Canada

Events from the year 1908 in Canada.

== Incumbents ==
=== Crown ===
- Monarch – Edward VII

=== Federal government ===
- Governor General – Albert Grey, 4th Earl Grey
- Prime Minister – Wilfrid Laurier
- Chief Justice – Charles Fitzpatrick (Quebec)
- Parliament – 10th (until 17 September)

=== Provincial governments ===
==== Lieutenant governors ====
- Lieutenant Governor of Alberta – George Hedley Vicars Bulyea
- Lieutenant Governor of British Columbia – James Dunsmuir
- Lieutenant Governor of Manitoba – Daniel Hunter McMillan
- Lieutenant Governor of New Brunswick – Lemuel John Tweedie
- Lieutenant Governor of Nova Scotia – Duncan Cameron Fraser
- Lieutenant Governor of Ontario – William Mortimer Clark (until September 22) then John Morison Gibson
- Lieutenant Governor of Prince Edward Island – Donald Alexander MacKinnon
- Lieutenant Governor of Quebec – Louis-Amable Jetté (until September 15) then Charles Alphonse Pantaléon Pelletier
- Lieutenant Governor of Saskatchewan – Amédée Forget

==== Premiers ====
- Premier of Alberta – Alexander Cameron Rutherford
- Premier of British Columbia – Richard McBride
- Premier of Manitoba – Rodmond Roblin
- Premier of New Brunswick – Clifford William Robinson (until March 24) then John Douglas Hazen
- Premier of Nova Scotia – George Henry Murray
- Premier of Ontario – James Whitney
- Premier of Prince Edward Island – Arthur Peters (until January 29) then Francis Haszard (from February 1)
- Premier of Quebec – Lomer Gouin
- Premier of Saskatchewan – Thomas Walter Scott

=== Territorial governments ===
==== Commissioners ====
- Commissioner of Yukon – Alexander Henderson
- Gold Commissioner of Yukon – F.X. Gosselin
- Commissioner of Northwest Territories – Frederick D. White

== Events ==
- January 2 – The Royal Canadian Mint opens.
- January 29 – Arthur Peters, Premier of Prince Edward Island, dies in office
- February 1 – F. L. Haszard becomes premier of Prince Edward Island.
- March 7 – The University of British Columbia is established by the British Columbia University Act.
- March 24 – Sir John Douglas Hazen becomes premier of New Brunswick, replacing Clifford Robinson.
- June 8 – In the Ontario election, Sir James Whitney's Conservatives win a second consecutive majority.
- June 12 – Saskatchewan Government Telephones created.
- August 2 – A fire in the Kootenay region kills 70.
- August 14 – In the Saskatchewan election, Walter Scott's Liberals win a second consecutive majority.
- September 23 – The University of Alberta opens.
- October 26 – In the federal election, Sir Wilfrid Laurier's Liberals win a fourth consecutive majority.

=== Full date unknown ===
- Anne of Green Gables is first published, having a great effect on Prince Edward Island.
- The Opium and Narcotics Act is passed banning certain drugs in Canada.
- The Grain Growers Guide is first published.
- The Child Labour Act of Ontario is passed.
- Vancouver Courier first published.

== Arts and literature ==
- Lucy Maud Montgomery's Anne of Green Gables is published.

== Births ==
=== January to June ===
- January 1 – Clarence Dunlap, Chief of the Air Staff Royal Canadian Air Force (d. 2003)
- January 22 – Sinclair Ross, banker and author (d.1996)
- February 1 – Louis Rasminsky, third Governor of the Bank of Canada (d.1998)
- February 7 – Lela Brooks, speed skater (d.1990)
- February 10 – Jean Coulthard, composer and academic (d.2000)
- March 5 – Colin Emerson Bennett, politician and lawyer (d. 1993)
- March 24 – Carl Klinck, literary historian and academic (d. 1990)
- April 7 – Percy Faith, band-leader, orchestrator and composer (d. 1976)
- May 11 – Hide Hyodo Shimizu, Japanese-Canadian educator and activist (d. 1999)
- May 19 – Percy Williams, athlete (d. 1982)
- May 26 – James Sinclair, politician, businessman and father of Margaret Sinclair, one-time wife of Prime Minister Pierre Trudeau, and grandfather of Justin Trudeau (d.1984)
- May 28 – Léo Cadieux, politician (d.2005)
- June 5 – Maxwell Meighen, financier (d.1992)
- June 12 – Alphonse Ouimet, broadcaster (d. 1988)
- June 18 – Stanley Knowles, politician (d.1997)

=== July to December ===
- July 11
  - Gérard Légaré, politician (d. 1997)
  - Yves Prévost, politician and lawyer (d. 1997)
- September 20 – Ernest Manning, Premier of Alberta (d.1996)
- October 15 – John Kenneth Galbraith, economist and diplomat (d. 2006 in the United States)
- October 18 – Alfred Henry Bence, politician and barrister (d.1977)
- October 24 – John Tuzo Wilson, geophysicist and geologist (d. 1993)
- October 31 – Muriel Duckworth, pacifist and social activist (d. 2009)
- November 3 – Bronko Nagurski, American football player (d. 1990)
- November 10 – Charles Merritt, army officer and politician (d. 2000)
- December 6 – Nicholas Goldschmidt, conductor, administrator and artistic director (d.2004)
- December 13 – W. L. Morton, historian (d.1980)
- December 23 – Yousuf Karsh, photographer (d.2002)

== Deaths ==
=== January to June ===
- January 6 – George Dixon, first Canadian-born boxing champion (b.1870)
- January 13 – George Anthony Walkem, jurist and Premier of British Columbia (b.1834)
- January 29 – Arthur Peters, Premier of Prince Edward Island (b.1854)
- May 31 – Louis-Honoré Fréchette, politician and writer (b.1839)
- June 14 – Frederick Stanley, 16th Earl of Derby, Governor General of Canada (b.1841)
- June 24 – William Whiteway, Premier of Newfoundland (b.1828)

=== July to December ===
- August 18 – Alfred Boyd, 1st Premier of Manitoba (b.1835)
- September 7 – Joseph-Guillaume Bossé, politician and lawyer (b.1843)
- October 30 – Thomas Greenway, 7th Premier of Manitoba (b.1838)
- November 16 – Henri-Gustave Joly de Lotbinière, 4th Premier of Quebec and Lieutenant Governor of British Columbia (b.1829)
- December 11 – Jean Blanchet, politician (b.1843)
- December 25 – William McGuigan, politician and 10th Mayor of Vancouver (b.1853)
