= 1909 in Canada =

- Decades: 1880s; 1890s; 1900s; 1910s; 1920s
- See also: History of Canada; Timeline of Canadian history; List of years in Canada

The following lists events that happened during 1909 in Canada.

== Incumbents ==
=== Crown ===
- Monarch – Edward VII

=== Federal government ===
- Governor General – Albert Grey, 4th Earl Grey
- Prime Minister – Wilfrid Laurier
- Chief Justice – Charles Fitzpatrick (Quebec)
- Parliament – 11th (from 20 January)

=== Provincial governments ===
==== Lieutenant governors ====
- Lieutenant Governor of Alberta – George Hedley Vicars Bulyea
- Lieutenant Governor of British Columbia – James Dunsmuir (until December 3) then Thomas Wilson Paterson
- Lieutenant Governor of Manitoba – Daniel Hunter McMillan
- Lieutenant Governor of New Brunswick – Lemuel John Tweedie
- Lieutenant Governor of Nova Scotia – Duncan Cameron Fraser
- Lieutenant Governor of Ontario – John Morison Gibson
- Lieutenant Governor of Prince Edward Island – Donald Alexander MacKinnon
- Lieutenant Governor of Quebec – Charles Alphonse Pantaléon Pelletier
- Lieutenant Governor of Saskatchewan – Amédée Forget

==== Premiers ====
- Premier of Alberta – Alexander Cameron Rutherford
- Premier of British Columbia – Richard McBride
- Premier of Manitoba – Rodmond Roblin
- Premier of New Brunswick – John Douglas Hazen
- Premier of Nova Scotia – George Henry Murray
- Premier of Ontario – James Whitney
- Premier of Prince Edward Island – Francis Haszard
- Premier of Quebec – Lomer Gouin
- Premier of Saskatchewan – Thomas Walter Scott

=== Territorial governments ===
==== Commissioners ====
- Commissioner of Yukon – Alexander Henderson
- Gold Commissioner of Yukon – F.X. Gosselin
- Commissioner of Northwest Territories – Frederick D. White

== Events ==
- January 11 – The Boundary Waters Treaty signed.
- February 23 – The first powered flight in Canada is made by John McCurdy in the AEA Silver Dart, flying 2,640 feet (805 m) from the ice of Bras d'Or Lake at Baddeck on Cape Breton Island.
- March 22 – 1909 Alberta election: Alexander Rutherford's Liberals win a second consecutive majority.
- April 6 – Robert Peary claims to have reached the North Pole.
- July 13 – Gold is discovered near Cochrane, Ontario.
- August – The Canadian Pacific Railway's Spiral Tunnels are opened in British Columbia's Kicking Horse Pass.
- September 2 – Jeanne Mance Monument unveiled in Montreal.
- September 6 – Field Day Sports athletic competition Toronto.
- October 13 – The Ontario Provincial Police is established.

=== Full date unknown ===
- University of Toronto Schools opens as an all-boys school.
- Leon's furniture store opens.
- The Criminal Code is amended to criminalize the abduction of women. Before this, the abduction of any woman over 16 was legal, except if she was an heiress.

== Arts and literature ==
- March 22 – Gabrielle Roy, French Canadian author (died 1983)
- October 24 – Sheila Watson (Sheila Doherty), Canadian novelist and critic (died 1998)

== Sport ==
- December 4
  - University of Toronto defeats the Toronto Parkdale Canoe Club 26–6 to win the 1st Grey Cup at Rosedale Field. Montreal Canadiens are established on the same day.
  - Montreal Canadiens, a professional ice hockey club, is founded.

== Births ==
=== January to June ===
- February 4 – Jack Shadbolt, painter (d.1998)
- February 14 – A. M. Klein, poet, journalist, novelist, short story writer and lawyer (d.1972)
- March 2 – Art Alexandre, ice hockey player (d.1976)
- March 19 – John Fauquier, war hero
- March 20 – Jack Bush, painter (d.1977)
- March 22 – Gabrielle Roy, author (d.1983)
- April 6 – George Isaac Smith, lawyer, politician and Premier of Nova Scotia (d.1982)
- May 8 – Samuel Boulanger, politician (d.1989)
- May 29 – Red Horner, ice hockey player (d.2005)
- May 31 – Aurore Gagnon, murder victim (d.1920)
- June 23 – David Lewis, lawyer and politician (d.1981)

=== July to December ===
- August 12 – Albert Bruce Matthews, commander of the 2nd Canadian Infantry Division during the Second World War (d.1991)
- August 15 – Maurice Breton, politician and lawyer (d.2001)
- August 18 – Gérard Filion, businessman and journalist (d.2005)
- September 12 – Donald MacDonald, labour leader
- October 12 – Dorothy Livesay, poet (d.1996)
- October 19 – Robert Beatty, actor (d.1992)
- October 24 – Sheila Watson, novelist, critic and teacher (d.1998)
- November 3 – Russell Paulley, politician (d.1984)

=== Full date unknown ===
- Ronald Martland, Justice of the Supreme Court of Canada (d.1997)

== Deaths ==
- May 5 – Daniel Lionel Hanington, politician and 5th Premier of New Brunswick (b.1835)
- May 7 – William Hallett Ray, politician (b. 1825)
- May 12 – Michel Auger, politician (b.1830)
- October 7 – William Thomas Pipes, politician and Premier of Nova Scotia (b.1850)
- October 27 – James William Bain, politician (b.1838)
- November 14 – Joshua Slocum, seaman, adventurer, writer, and first man to sail single-handedly around the world (b.1844)
- December 17 – George Cox, mayor of Ottawa (b.1834)
