= 1903 in Canada =

- Decades: 1880s; 1890s; 1900s; 1910s; 1920s
- See also: History of Canada; Timeline of Canadian history; List of years in Canada

Events from the year 1903 in Canada.

== Incumbents ==
=== Crown ===
- Monarch – Edward VII

=== Federal government ===
- Governor General – Gilbert Elliot-Murray-Kynynmound, 4th Earl of Minto
- Prime Minister – Wilfrid Laurier
- Chief Justice – Henri Elzéar Taschereau (Quebec)
- Parliament – 9th

=== Provincial governments ===
==== Lieutenant governors ====
- Lieutenant Governor of British Columbia – Henri-Gustave Joly de Lotbinière
- Lieutenant Governor of Manitoba – Daniel Hunter McMillan
- Lieutenant Governor of New Brunswick – Jabez Bunting Snowball
- Lieutenant Governor of Nova Scotia – Alfred Gilpin Jones
- Lieutenant Governor of Ontario – Oliver Mowat (until April 19) then William Mortimer Clark (from April 21)
- Lieutenant Governor of Prince Edward Island – Peter Adolphus McIntyre
- Lieutenant Governor of Quebec – Louis-Amable Jetté

==== Premiers ====
- Premier of British Columbia – Edward Gawler Prior (until June 1) then Richard McBride
- Premier of Manitoba – Rodmond Roblin
- Premier of New Brunswick – Lemuel John Tweedie
- Premier of Nova Scotia – George Henry Murray
- Premier of Ontario – George William Ross
- Premier of Prince Edward Island – Arthur Peters
- Premier of Quebec – Simon-Napoléon Parent

=== Territorial governments ===
==== Commissioners ====
- Commissioner of Yukon – Zachary Taylor Wood (acting) (until March 4) then Frederick Tennyson Congdon

==== Lieutenant governors ====
- Lieutenant Governor of Keewatin – Daniel Hunter McMillan
- Lieutenant Governor of the North-West Territories – Amédée E. Forget

==== Premiers ====
- Premier of North-West Territories – Frederick Haultain

== Events ==
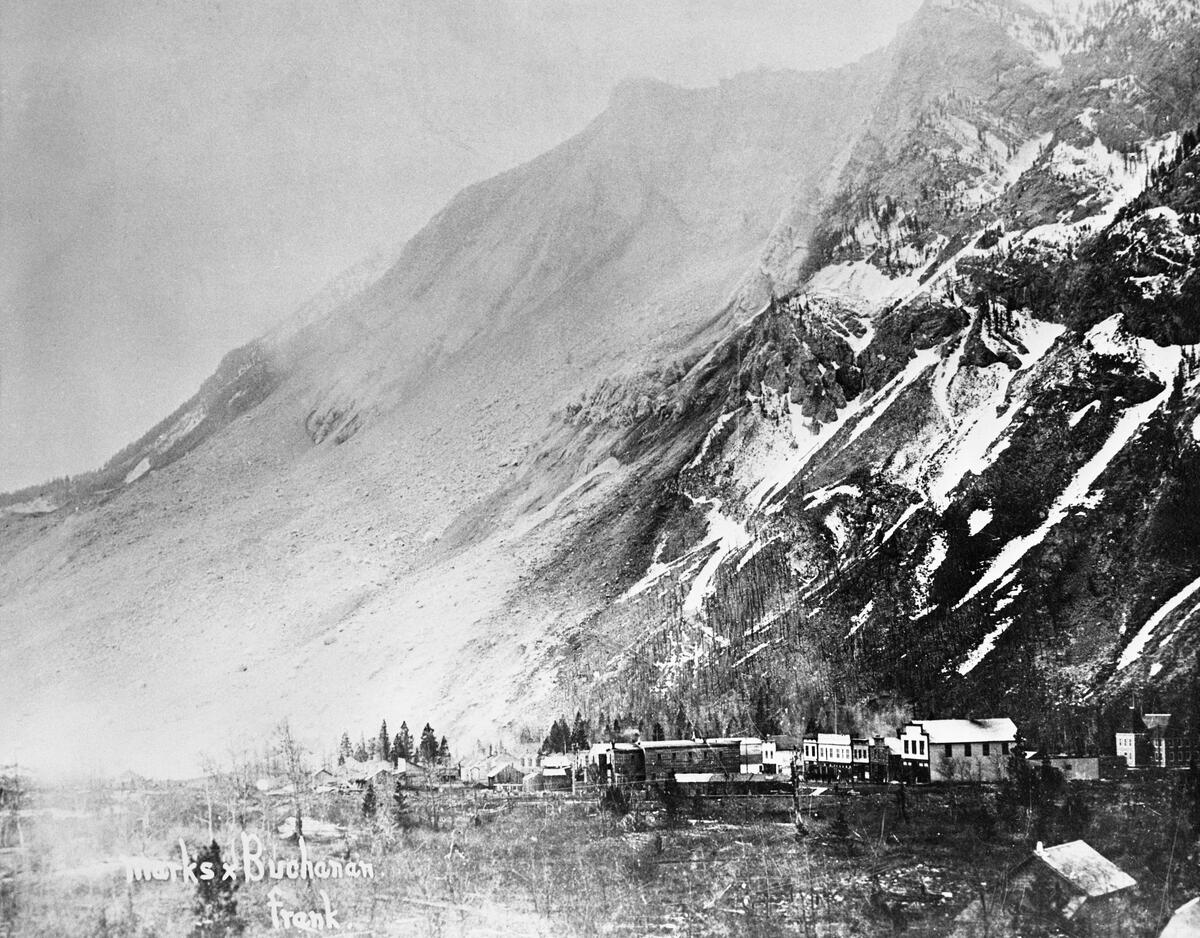
April 29: The Frank Slide occurs

- March 22 – Because of a drought, the U.S. side of Niagara Falls runs short of water
- March 1 – Henri Bourassa's Ligue nationaliste is founded
- March 25 – The Alaska Boundary Dispute is settled in the United States' favour
- April 29 – The Frank Slide, The most destructive landslide in Canadian history, kills 70 in Frank, District of Alberta, North-West Territories
- June 1 – Richard McBride becomes Premier of British Columbia, replacing Edward Prior
- June 19 – Regina, District of Assiniboia, North-West Territories, is incorporated as a city
- June 24 – Ignace Bourget Monument unveiled
- July 1 – Ray Knight builds the Raymond Stampede rodeo arena and rodeo grandstands in Raymond, District of Alberta, North-West Territories, which are the first ever built in the world.

== See also ==
- List of Canadian films

== Births ==
=== January to June ===
- January 3 – Charles Foulkes, General, first Chairman of the Chiefs of Staff, negotiated the WWII Nazi surrender in the Netherlands (d.1969)
- February 15 – Sarto Fournier, politician and mayor of Montreal (d.1980)
- February 16 – Georges-Henri Lévesque, Dominican priest and sociologist (d.2000)
- February 22 – Morley Callaghan, novelist, short story writer, playwright, and television and radio personality (d.1990)
- February 25 – King Clancy, ice hockey player (d.1986)
- May 23 – Elsie Gibbons, politician, first women to be elected mayor of a municipality in Quebec (d.2003)
- June 10 – Alexander Wallace Matheson, politician and Premier of Prince Edward Island (d.1976)
- June 23 – Paul Martin Sr., politician (d.1992)
- June 30 – Donald Ferguson Brown, politician, barrister and lawyer

=== July to December ===
- July 16 – Carmen Lombardo, singer and composer (d.1971)
- July 30
  - Harold Ballard, owner of the Toronto Maple Leafs (d.1990)
  - Alan Macnaughton, politician (d.1999)
- August 31 – Helen Battle, zoologist
- December 8 – Louis-Marie Régis, philosopher, theologian, scholar and member of the Dominican Order (d.1988)

== Deaths ==
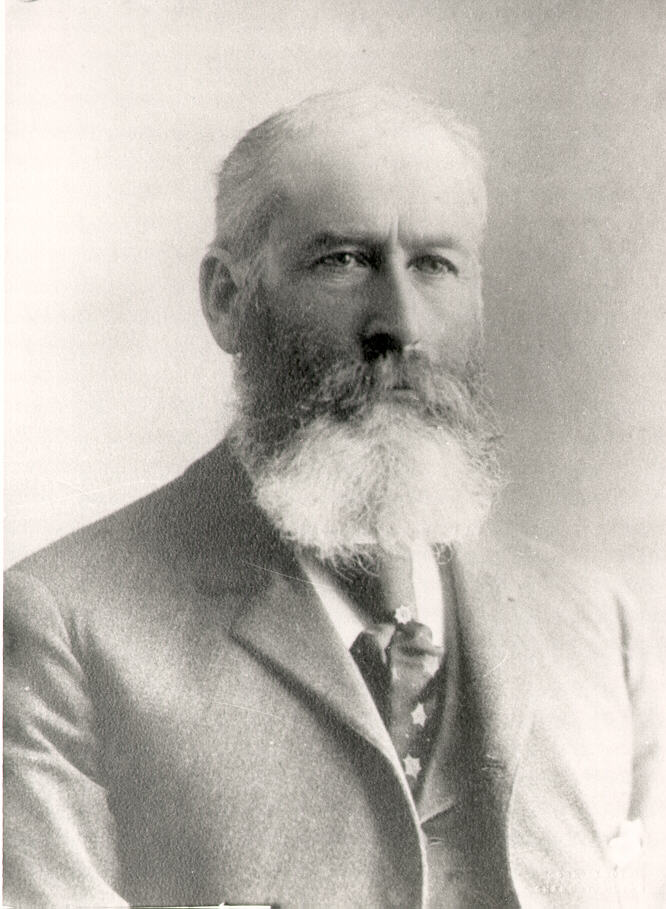
Donald Farquharson

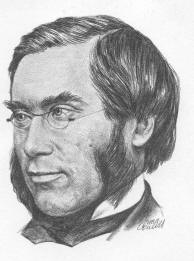
Oliver Mowat

- January 7 – Robert Atkinson Davis, businessman, politician and 4th Premier of Manitoba (b. 1841)
- July 2 – Oliver Mowat, politician, 3rd Premier of Ontario and 8th Lieutenant Governor of Ontario (b. 1820)
- April 30 – Emily Stowe, first female doctor to practice in Canada and women's rights and suffrage activist (b. 1831)
- May 6 – Samuel Bridgeland, politician (b. 1847)
- May 8 – David Mills, politician, author, poet and jurist (b. 1831)
- June 26 – Donald Farquharson, politician and Premier of Prince Edward Island (b. 1834)
- November 12 – William Doran, mayor of Hamilton, Ontario (b. 1834)
- November 14 – John Andrew Davidson, politician (b. 1852)
