= 1906 in Canada =

- Decades: 1880s; 1890s; 1900s; 1910s; 1920s
- See also: History of Canada; Timeline of Canadian history; List of years in Canada

Events from the year 1906 in Canada.

== Incumbents ==
=== Crown ===
- Monarch – Edward VII

=== Federal government ===
- Governor General – Albert Grey, 4th Earl Grey
- Prime Minister – Wilfrid Laurier
- Chief Justice – Henri Elzéar Taschereau (Quebec) (until 2 May) then Charles Fitzpatrick (Quebec) (from 2 June)
- Parliament – 10th

=== Provincial governments ===
==== Lieutenant governors ====
- Lieutenant Governor of Alberta – George Hedley Vicars Bulyea
- Lieutenant Governor of British Columbia – Henri Joly de Lotbinière (until May 11) then James Dunsmuir
- Lieutenant Governor of Manitoba – Daniel Hunter McMillan
- Lieutenant Governor of New Brunswick – Jabez Bunting Snowball
- Lieutenant Governor of Nova Scotia – Alfred Gilpin Jones (until March 15) then Duncan Cameron Fraser
- Lieutenant Governor of Ontario – William Mortimer Clark
- Lieutenant Governor of Prince Edward Island – Donald Alexander MacKinnon
- Lieutenant Governor of Quebec – Louis-Amable Jetté
- Lieutenant Governor of Saskatchewan – Amédée Forget

==== Premiers ====
- Premier of Alberta – Alexander Cameron Rutherford
- Premier of British Columbia – Richard McBride
- Premier of Manitoba – Rodmond Roblin
- Premier of New Brunswick – Lemuel John Tweedie
- Premier of Nova Scotia – George Henry Murray
- Premier of Ontario – James Whitney
- Premier of Prince Edward Island – Arthur Peters
- Premier of Quebec – Lomer Gouin
- Premier of Saskatchewan – Thomas Walter Scott

=== Territorial governments ===
==== Commissioners ====
- Commissioner of Yukon – William Wallace Burns McInnes (until December 31) then John T. Lithgow (acting)
- Commissioner of Northwest Territories – Frederick D. White

== Events ==
- January 1 – Canada's first movie theatre Ouimetoscope opens in Montreal
- January 22 – The SS Valencia strikes a reef off Vancouver Island, killing over 100 (officially 136) in the ensuing disaster.
- March 27 – The Alpine Club of Canada is founded in Winnipeg by Elizabeth Parker and Arthur Oliver Wheeler.
- April 30 – The Ottawa Public Library opens
- May 7 – Ontario Hydro created
- May 23 – Regina decreed capital of Saskatchewan
- June 24 – Octave Crémazie Monument unveiled
- August 26 – Edward VII grants the Coat of Arms of Saskatchewan
- The Revillon Frères trading post opens at Fort Saint John, British Columbia, as competition against the Hudson's Bay Company
- August 28 – Treaty 10 is signed.

== Sport ==
- February 23 – Tommy Burns becomes the First Canadian to be Boxing's Heavyweight champion by defeating Marvin Hart

== Births ==
- January 15 – Edna Staebler, author (d. 2006)
- January 27 – Walter L. Gordon, accountant, businessman, politician and writer (d.1987)
- January 29 – Joe Primeau, ice hockey player (d.1989)
- February 14 – Roland Beaudry, politician, journalist, publicist and publisher (d.1964)
- March 10 – Lionel Bertrand, politician, journalist and newspaper editor (d.1979)
- May 15 – Robert Methven Petrie, astronomer (d.1966)
- May 16 – Alfred Pellan, painter (d.1988)
- June 22 – Stanley Fox, politician (d.1984)
- June 24 – George Alexander Gale, chief justice of Ontario (d. 1997)
- June 26 – Marian Scott, painter
- July 18 – S. I. Hayakawa, Canadian-born American academic and politician (d. 1992)
- September 24 – Leonard Marsh, social scientist and professor (d.1983)
- November 20 – John Josiah Robinette, lawyer (d.1996)
- December 16 – Barbara Kent, Canadian actress

== Deaths ==
- February 2 – Thomas Arkell, politician, farmer and grain merchant (b.1823)
- March 31 – James McIntyre, poet (b.1828)
- April 12 – Robert Thorburn, merchant, politician and Premier of Newfoundland (b.1836)
- May 3 – Peter White, politician (b.1838)
- May 19 – Gabriel Dumont, Metis leader (b.1837)
- June 9 – William Carpenter Bompas, Church of England clergyman, bishop and missionary (b.1834)
- June 11 – Hector-Louis Langevin, lawyer, politician and a Father of Confederation (b.1826)
- October 7 – Honoré Beaugrand, journalist, politician, author and folklorist (b.1848)
