= 1920 in Canada =

- Decades: 1900s; 1910s; 1920s; 1930s; 1940s
- See also: History of Canada; Timeline of Canadian history; List of years in Canada

Events from the year 1920 in Canada.

== Incumbents ==
=== Crown ===
- Monarch – George V

=== Federal government ===
- Governor General – Victor Cavendish, 9th Duke of Devonshire
- Prime Minister – Robert Borden (until July 10) then Arthur Meighen
- Chief Justice – Louis Henry Davies (Prince Edward Island)
- Parliament – 13th

=== Provincial governments ===
==== Lieutenant governors ====
- Lieutenant Governor of Alberta – Robert Brett
- Lieutenant Governor of British Columbia – Edward Gawler Prior (until December 12) then Walter Cameron Nichol (from December 24)
- Lieutenant Governor of Manitoba – James Albert Manning Aikins
- Lieutenant Governor of New Brunswick – William Pugsley
- Lieutenant Governor of Nova Scotia – MacCallum Grant
- Lieutenant Governor of Ontario – Lionel Herbert Clarke
- Lieutenant Governor of Prince Edward Island – Murdock MacKinnon
- Lieutenant Governor of Quebec – Charles Fitzpatrick
- Lieutenant Governor of Saskatchewan – Richard Stuart Lake

==== Premiers ====
- Premier of Alberta – Charles Stewart
- Premier of British Columbia – John Oliver
- Premier of Manitoba – Tobias Norris
- Premier of New Brunswick – Walter Foster
- Premier of Nova Scotia – George Henry Murray
- Premier of Ontario – Ernest Drury
- Premier of Prince Edward Island – John Howatt Bell
- Premier of Quebec – Lomer Gouin (until July 9) then Louis-Alexandre Taschereau
- Premier of Saskatchewan – William Melville Martin

=== Territorial governments ===
==== Commissioners ====
- Gold Commissioner of Yukon – George P. MacKenzie
- Commissioner of Northwest Territories – William Wallace Cory

== Events ==
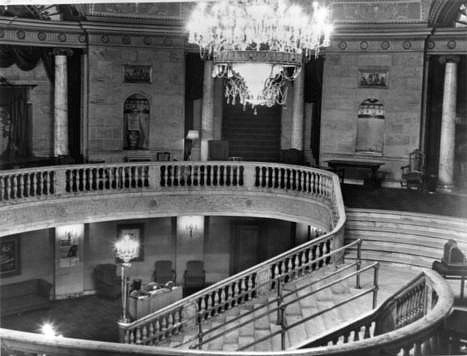
The Capitol Cinema in Ottawa opens on November 8

- January 10 – Canada is a founding member of the League of Nations, effectively ending the declaration of war.
- February 1 – The Royal North-West Mounted Police and the Dominion Police are amalgamated and renamed the Royal Canadian Mounted Police.
- February 14 – Université de Montréal founded.
- February 26 – The Indian Act is amended to give Canadian aboriginal peoples the right to vote in band elections.
- March 12 – The first Lions Club outside the United States is founded in Windsor, Ontario.
- May 14 – Canadian Forum magazine founded.
- June – The Catholic Women's League is formed in Montreal.
- June 24 – Dollard des Ormeaux Monument unveiled.
- July 1 – Under the Dominion Elections Act, uniform franchise is established and the right for women to be elected to parliament is made permanent.
- July 9 – Louis-Alexandre Taschereau becomes premier of Quebec, replacing Sir Lomer Gouin.
- July 10 – Arthur Meighen becomes prime minister, replacing Sir Robert Borden.
- July 11 – Charles Stephens, a barber and daredevil from Bristol, England, dies attempting to go over Niagara Falls.
- October 17 – The first airplane to fly across Canada arrives in Richmond from Halifax.
- December 25 – Walter Cameron Nichol becomes the 12th Lieutenant Governor of British Columbia.

=== Date unknown ===
- Esther Marjorie Hill (1895–1985) becomes the first female architect in Canada when she graduates from the University of Toronto.

== Arts and literature ==
- May 7 – The first exhibit of art by the Group of Seven opens in Toronto.
- November 8 – The Capitol Cinema opens in Ottawa, the capital's only true movie palace.
- Undated – A group of artists, educators, and art patrons formed the British Columbia Art League to lobby the provincial and city governments for a school.

== Sport ==
- January 10 – The Montreal Canadiens and Toronto St. Patricks combine for 21 goals to set an NHL record for most goals in a single game.
- March 23–25 – The Ontario Hockey Association's Toronto Canoe Club win their first Memorial Cup by defeating Saskatchewan Amateur Hockey Association's Selkirk Fishermen 15 to 5 in a 2-game aggregate played at Arena Gardens in Toronto
- April 1 – The NHL's Ottawa Senators win their ninth Stanley Cup by defeating the Pacific Coast Hockey Association's Seattle Metropolitans 3 games to 2. The deciding game was played at Toronto's Arena Gardens
- December 4 – The University of Toronto Varsity Blues win their fourth and final Grey Cup by defeating the Toronto Argonauts 16 to 3 in the 8th Grey Cup played at Toronto's Varsity Stadium

1920 Olympics

- April 26 – The Winnipeg Falcons representing Canada beat Sweden 12–1 to win the gold medal for ice hockey at the 1920 Olympics in Antwerp.
- August 18 – Earl Thomson wins a gold medal in Men's 110 m Hurdles at the Athletics
- August 23 – Bert Schneider wins a gold medal for Canada in the Boxing Welterweight at the 1920 Olympics in Antwerp.

== Births ==
=== January to March ===
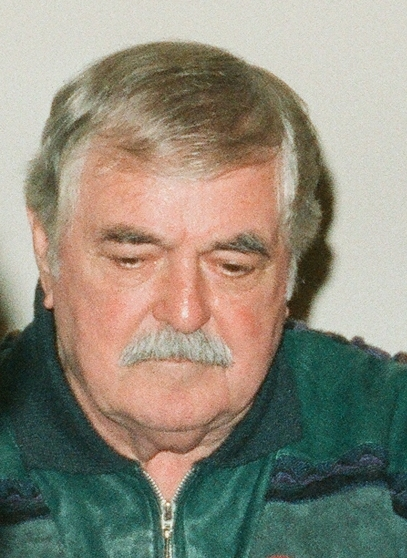
James Doohan, 1997

- January 4 – James William Baskin, politician and businessman (d. 1999)
- January 6 – Henry Corden, Canadian-born American actor, voice actor and singer (d.2005)
- January 7 – Margaret W. Thompson, geneticist (d. 2014)
- January 12 – Bill Reid, artist (d. 1998)
- February 22 – Ralph Raymond Loffmark, politician. (d. 2012)
- February 23 – Paul Gérin-Lajoie, lawyer, philanthropist, politician and Minister (d. 2018)
- February 25
  - Merrill Edwin Barrington, politician, accountant and insurance broker (d. 1965)
  - Gérard Bessette, author and educator (d. 2005)
- March 3 – James Doohan, actor (d. 2005)
- March 9 – Erwin Schild, rabbi and author (d. 2024)
- March 19
  - Cyril Lloyd Francis, politician and Speaker of the House of Commons of Canada (d. 2007)
  - Laurent Noël, Roman Catholic bishop (d. 2022)
- March 24 – Bill Irwin, Olympic skier (d. 2013)

=== April to June ===
- April 2 – Gerald Bouey, 4th Governor of the Bank of Canada (d. 2004)
- May 1 – Louis Siminovitch, molecular biologist (d. 2021)
- May 2 – William Hutt, actor (d. 2007)
- May 5 – Bill Hunter, ice hockey player, general manager and coach (d. 2002)
- May 8
  - Barbara Howard, sprinter (d. 2017)
  - Harry Rankin, lawyer and politician (d. 2002)
- May 9 – Helen Nicol, baseball player (d. 2021)
- May 25 – Maria Gomori, Hungarian-born psychologist (d. 2021)
- May 27 – Peter Dmytruk, World War II military hero (d. 1943)
- June 4 – Lynda Adams, diver (d. 1997)
- June 6 – Jan Rubeš, opera singer and actor (d. 2009)
- June 11 – Qapik Attagutsiak, Inuit elder (d. 2023)
- June 14 – Stanley Waters, Senator (d. 1991)
- June 15 – Sam Sniderman, founder of the Sam the Record Man chain (d. 2012)
- June 24 – Joe Greene, politician (d. 1978)
- June 26 – Jean-Pierre Roy, Major League Baseball pitcher (d. 2014)

=== July to December ===
- July 12
  - Pierre Berton, author, television personality and journalist (d. 2004)
  - Bob Fillion, ice hockey player (d. 2015)
- August 2 – Marcel Adams, businessman (d. 2020)
- August 3 – Lucien Lamoureux, politician and Speaker of the House of Commons of Canada (d. 1998)
- August 12 – Aidan Maloney, politician and executive (d. 2018)
- August 19 – Agnes Benidickson, first female chancellor of Queen's University at Kingston, Ontario (d.2007)
- August 24 – Alex Colville, painter (d. 2013)
- September 4 – Catherine Bennett, baseball player
- September 6 – Helen Hunley, politician (d. 2010)
- September 9 – Joan Neiman, senator (d. 2022)
- September 11 – Dalton Camp, journalist, politician, political strategist and commentator (d. 2002)
- September 26 – Edmund Tobin Asselin, politician (d. 1999)
- October 1 – Charles Daudelin, sculptor and painter (d. 2001)
- October 13 – Evelyn Dick, murderer
- October 29 – Bill Juzda, ice hockey player (d. 2008)
- November 11 – John Ferguson Browne, politician (d. 2014)
- November 17 – George Dunning, Canadian-born cartoon director, animator (d. 1979)
- November 18 – George Johnson, politician and Lieutenant-Governor of Manitoba (d. 1995)

== Deaths ==
=== January to June ===
- February 12 – Aurore Gagnon, murder victim (b. 1909)
- February 16 – Augustus F. Goodridge, politician and Premier of Newfoundland (b. 1839)
- April 25 – Alexander Grant MacKay, teacher, lawyer and politician (b. 1860)
- June 6 – James Dunsmuir, industrialist, politician and Premier of British Columbia (b. 1851)
- June 18 – John Macoun, naturalist (b. 1831)
- June 27 – Adolphe-Basile Routhier, judge, author and lyricist (b. 1839)

=== July to December ===
- September 5 – Agnes Macdonald, 1st Baroness Macdonald of Earnscliffe, second wife of John A. Macdonald, first Prime Minister of Canada (b. 1836)
- September 7 – Simon-Napoléon Parent, politician and Premier of Quebec (b. 1855)
- September 18 – Robert Beaven, businessman, politician and 6th Premier of British Columbia (b. 1836)
- September 30 – William Wilfred Sullivan, journalist, jurist, politician and Premier of Prince Edward Island (b. 1843)
- November 19 – Byron Moffatt Britton, politician, lawyer and lecturer (b. 1833)
- December 12 – Edward Gawler Prior, mining engineer, politician and Premier of British Columbia (b. 1854)

== See also ==
- List of Canadian films
