= 1905 in Canada =

- Decades: 1880s; 1890s; 1900s; 1910s; 1920s
- See also: History of Canada; Timeline of Canadian history; List of years in Canada

Events from the year 1905 in Canada.

== Incumbents ==
=== Crown ===
- Monarch – Edward VII

=== Federal government ===
- Governor General – Albert Grey, 4th Earl Grey
- Prime Minister – Wilfrid Laurier
- Chief Justice – Henri Elzéar Taschereau (Quebec)
- Parliament – 10th (from 11 January)

=== Provincial governments ===
==== Lieutenant governors ====
- Lieutenant Governor of Alberta – George Hedley Vicars Bulyea (from September 1)
- Lieutenant Governor of British Columbia – Henri-Gustave Joly de Lotbinière
- Lieutenant Governor of Manitoba – Daniel Hunter McMillan
- Lieutenant Governor of New Brunswick – Jabez Bunting Snowball
- Lieutenant Governor of Nova Scotia – Alfred Gilpin Jones
- Lieutenant Governor of Ontario – William Mortimer Clark
- Lieutenant Governor of Prince Edward Island – Donald Alexander MacKinnon
- Lieutenant Governor of Quebec – Louis-Amable Jetté
- Lieutenant Governor of Saskatchewan – Amédée Forget (from September 1)

==== Premiers ====
- Premier of Alberta – Alexander Cameron Rutherford (from September 2)
- Premier of British Columbia – Richard McBride
- Premier of Manitoba – Rodmond Roblin
- Premier of New Brunswick – Lemuel John Tweedie
- Premier of Nova Scotia – George Henry Murray
- Premier of Ontario – George William Ross (until February 8) then James Whitney
- Premier of Prince Edward Island – Arthur Peters
- Premier of Quebec – Simon-Napoléon Parent (until March 24) then Lomer Gouin
- Premier of Saskatchewan – Thomas Walter Scott (from September 5)

=== Territorial governments ===
==== Commissioners ====
- Commissioner of Yukon – Zachary Taylor Wood (acting) (until May 27) then William Wallace Burns McInnes
- Commissioner of Northwest Territories – Frederick D. White (from August 24)

==== Lieutenant governors ====
- Lieutenant Governor of Keewatin – Daniel Hunter McMillan (until September 1)
- Lieutenant Governor of the North-West Territories – Amédée E. Forget (until September 1)

=== Premiers ===
- Premier of North-West Territories – Frederick Haultain (until September 1)

== Events ==
- January 25 – 1905 Ontario election: Sir James Whitney's Conservatives win a majority, defeating G. W. Ross's Liberals
- February 8 – Sir James Whitney becomes premier of Ontario, replacing George Ross
- February 27 – Clifford Sifton resigns from cabinet
- March 23 – Lomer Gouin becomes premier of Quebec, replacing Simon-Napoléon Parent
- July 20 – The Saskatchewan Act and the Alberta Act receive royal assent
- August 24 – Frederick D. White becomes the first Commissioner of the Northwest Territories in Canada, and will serve until his death in 1918.
- August 26 – Roald Amundsen begins the first to travel through the Northwest Passage
- September 1 – Saskatchewan and Alberta are established as provinces
- September 2 – Alexander Rutherford becomes the first premier of Alberta
- September 5 – Walter Scott becomes the first premier of Saskatchewan
- November 9 – 1905 Alberta general election: Alexander Rutherford's Liberals win a majority in the first Alberta election
- November 24 – The Canadian Northern Railway is completed to Edmonton
- December 13 – 1905 Saskatchewan election: Walter Scott's Liberals win a majority in the first Saskatchewan election

== Births ==
=== January to June ===
- January 21 – George Laurence, nuclear physicist (d.1987)
- January 28 – Ellen Fairclough, politician and first female member of the Canadian Cabinet (d.2004)
- February 8 – Louis-Philippe Pigeon, judge of the Supreme Court of Canada (d.1986)
- March 27 – Elsie MacGill, the world's first female aircraft designer (d.1980)
- April 30 – John Peters Humphrey, legal scholar, jurist and human rights advocate (d.1995)
- May 1 – Paul Desruisseaux, lawyer and politician (d. 1982)
- May 23 – Donald Fleming, politician, International Monetary Fund official and lawyer (d.1986)
- June 8 – Ralph Steinhauer, native leader, first Aboriginal to become the Lieutenant Governor of Alberta (d.1987)
- June 23 – Jack Pickersgill, civil servant and politician (d.1997)

=== July to December ===
- July 4 – Marie-Thérèse Paquin, pianist (d. 1997)
- July 25 – Grace MacInnis, politician and feminist (d.1991)
- August 1 – Helen Hogg-Priestley, astronomer (d.1993)
- August 31 – William Anderson, politician and businessman (d.1961)
- August 15 – E.K. Brown, literary critic
- September 21 – Loran Ellis Baker, politician (d.1991)
- November 1 – Paul-Émile Borduas, painter (d.1960)
- December 1 – Alex Wilson, track and field athlete and Olympic silver medallist (d.1994)
- December 24 – Milt Dunnell, sportswriter (d.2008)

=== Full date unknown ===
- Nat Taylor, inventor of the cineplex (d.2004)

== Deaths ==
- April 23 – Gédéon Ouimet, politician and 2nd Premier of Quebec (b.1823)
- May 23 – Fletcher Bath Wade, politician and barrister (b.1852)
- May 29 – William McDougall, lawyer, politician and a Father of Confederation (b.1822)
- August 1 – John Brown, politician, miller, mining consultant and prospector (b.1841)
- August 7 – Alexander Melville Bell, educator (b.1819)
- September 8 – David Howard Harrison, farmer, physician, politician and 6th Premier of Manitoba (b.1843)
- October 29 – Étienne Desmarteau, athlete and Olympic gold medallist (b.1873)
