= 1984 in Canada =

- Decades: 1960s; 1970s; 1980s; 1990s; 2000s
- See also: History of Canada; Timeline of Canadian history; List of years in Canada

Events from the year 1984 in Canada.

== Incumbents ==
=== Crown ===
- Monarch – Elizabeth II

=== Federal government ===
- Governor General – Edward Schreyer (until May 14) then Jeanne Sauvé
- Prime Minister – Pierre Trudeau (until June 30) then John Turner (June 30 to September 17) then Brian Mulroney
- Chief Justice – Bora Laskin (Ontario) (until 18 April) then Brian Dickson (Manitoba)
- Parliament – 32nd (until 9 July) then 33rd (from November 5)

=== Provincial governments ===
==== Lieutenant governors ====
- Lieutenant Governor of Alberta – Francis Charles Lynch-Staunton
- Lieutenant Governor of British Columbia – Robert Gordon Rogers
- Lieutenant Governor of Manitoba – Pearl McGonigal
- Lieutenant Governor of New Brunswick – George Stanley
- Lieutenant Governor of Newfoundland – William Anthony Paddon
- Lieutenant Governor of Nova Scotia – John Elvin Shaffner (until February 1) then Alan Abraham
- Lieutenant Governor of Ontario – John Black Aird
- Lieutenant Governor of Prince Edward Island – Joseph Aubin Doiron
- Lieutenant Governor of Quebec – Jean-Pierre Côté (until March 28) then Gilles Lamontagne
- Lieutenant Governor of Saskatchewan – Frederick Johnson

==== Premiers ====
- Premier of Alberta – Peter Lougheed
- Premier of British Columbia – Bill Bennett
- Premier of Manitoba – Howard Pawley
- Premier of New Brunswick – Richard Hatfield
- Premier of Newfoundland – Brian Peckford
- Premier of Nova Scotia – John Buchanan
- Premier of Ontario – Bill Davis
- Premier of Prince Edward Island – James Lee
- Premier of Quebec – René Lévesque
- Premier of Saskatchewan – Grant Devine

=== Territorial governments ===
==== Commissioners ====
- Commissioner of Yukon – Douglas Bell
- Commissioner of Northwest Territories – John Havelock Parker

==== Premiers ====
- Premier of the Northwest Territories – George Braden then Richard Nerysoo
- Premier of Yukon – Chris Pearson

== Events ==
=== January to June ===
- January 12 - Richard Nerysoo becomes government leader of the Northwest Territories, replacing George Braden.
- February 29 - Pierre Trudeau announces he will retire as soon as the Liberal Party of Canada can elect another leader.
- April 5 - A fire races through Number 26 Colliery in Glace Bay on Cape Breton Island killing one miner. This effectively closes the mine permanently, ending years of coal mining in Glace Bay.
- May 8 - Cpl. Denis Lortie enters the Quebec National Assembly and opens fire, killing 3 and wounding 13. René Jalbert, sergeant-at-arms of the assembly, succeeds in calming him, for which he will later receive the Cross of Valour.
- June 30 - John Turner becomes Canada's seventeenth prime minister replacing the retiring Pierre Trudeau.

=== July to December ===
- July 18 - Quebec actress Denise Morelle is found murdered in a house she had gone to visit Sanguinet Street in Montreal. Autopsies show that she was raped and brutally beaten to death. The murderer, 49-year-old Gaetan Bissonnette, will not be discovered until 2007.
- August 31 - MuchMusic first airs.
- September 1 - The Sports Network (TSN) first airs.
- September 3 - In protest of the upcoming Papal visit, Thomas Bernard Brigham, a retired American armed forces officer, bombs Montreal's Central Station, killing 3 people and wounding more than 30.
- September 4 - In the 1984 federal election, the incumbent government of the Liberal Party of Canada is defeated as the Progressive Conservative Party of Canada, led by Brian Mulroney, wins the largest parliamentary majority in Canadian history.
- September 9–20 - Pope John Paul II tours Canada.
- September 17 - Brian Mulroney is sworn in as Canada's eighteenth prime minister.
- September 25 - The Premier of New Brunswick Richard Bennett Hatfield is accused of drug possession (35 grams of cannabis was found in his bag) during the official visit of Queen Elizabeth II in the province. He was finally acquitted.
- October 5 - Marc Garneau becomes the first Canadian in space, aboard the Space Shuttle Challenger.
- November 6
  - Saskatchewan MLA Colin Thatcher is convicted of the murder of his ex-wife Joanne.
  - Nova Scotia election: John Buchanan's Progressive Conservatives win a third consecutive majority.
- November 23 - The Fredericton City Hall is designated a National Historic Site.

=== Full date unknown ===
- Labatt introduces the first twist-off cap on a reusable beer bottle.
- Telelatino Network signs on in October.

== Arts and literature ==
=== New books ===
- Neuromancer: William Gibson
- La Détresse et l'enchantement: Gabrielle Roy
- Dinner Along the Amazon: Timothy Findley
- The Summer Tree: Guy Gavriel Kay

=== Awards ===
- See 1984 Governor General's Awards for a complete list of winners and finalists for those awards.
- Books in Canada First Novel Award: Heather Robertson, Willie
- Gerald Lampert Award: Sandra Birdsell, Night Travellers and Jean McKay, Gone to Grass
- Pat Lowther Award: Bronwen Wallace, Signs of the Former Tenant
- Stephen Leacock Award: Gary Lautens, No Sex Please...We're Married
- Vicky Metcalf Award: Bill Freeman

=== Film ===
- James Cameron's The Terminator propels the Canadian director to international fame

=== Television ===
- Jeopardy! is relaunched with Canadian Alex Trebek as host
- Second City Television ends its run on Canadian television

== Sport ==
- May 19 – Edmonton Oilers win their first Stanley Cup defeating the New York Islanders 5 to 2. The deciding Game 5 was played at Northlands Coliseum in Edmonton. Edmonton's own Mark Messier was awarded the Conn Smythe Trophy
- May 19 – Ottawa 67's win their first Memorial Cup by defeating the Kitchener Rangers 7 to 2. The final game was played at the Kitchener Memorial Auditorium in Kitchener, Ontario
- August 12 – At the 1984 Summer Olympics held in Los Angeles Canada has its best performance ever, mostly due to the boycott of the games by the Eastern Bloc countries.
- October 3 – Chicago Sting win their second Soccer Bowl by defeating the Toronto Blizzard 2 games to 0. The deciding game was played at Varsity Stadium in Toronto. This would be the final game played in the original North American Soccer League
- November 18 – Winnipeg Blue Bombers win their eighth Grey Cup (and first since 1962) by defeating the Hamilton Tiger-Cats 47 to 17 in the 72nd Grey Cup played at Commonwealth Stadium in Edmonton. Edmonton's own Sean Kehoe is awarded the game's Most Valuable Canadian
- November 24 – Guelph Gryphons win their first Vanier Cup by defeating the Mount Allison Mounties 22 to 13 in the 20th Vanier Cup played at Varsity Stadium in Toronto.

== Births ==
- January 2 – Kristen Hager, film and television actress
- January 26 – Jon Hameister-Ries, football player (died 2021)
- February 8 – Manuel Osborne-Paradis, skier
- February 10 – Chris Pellini, canoeist
- February 15 – Mark de Jonge, canoeist
- March 13 – Noel Fisher, actor
- March 26 – Stéphanie Lapointe, singer-songwriter and actress
- April 12 – Jean-François Gariépy, political commentator
- April 25 – Dallas Soonias, volleyball player
- April 27 – Pierre-Marc Bouchard, ice hockey player
- May 7 – Kevin Owens, pro wrestler
- May 29 – James Steacy, hammer thrower
- June 2 – Max Boyer, wrestler
- June 13 – Chanelle Charron-Watson, swimmer
- June 16 – Rick Nash, ice hockey player
- June 27 – Kate Richardson, gymnast
- July 3 – Corey Sevier, actor
- July 11 – Melanie Papalia, actress
- July 12 – Sami Zayn, pro wrestler
- July 20 – Nicholas Tritton, judoka
- July 24 – Tyler Kyte, actor and singer
- August 4 – Scott Dickens, swimmer
- August 6 – Kit Lang, actor
- September 5
  - Marina Radu, water polo player
  - Shawn Hook, singer-songwriter
- September 19 – Kevin Zegers, actor
- September 22 – Laura Vandervoort, actress
- September 27 – Avril Lavigne, singer-songwriter, fashion designer and actress
- October 1 – Rosanna Tomiuk, water polo player
- October 4 – Sheray Thomas, basketball player
- October 11 – Martha MacIsaac, actress
- October 24 – Sultana Frizell, hammer thrower
- October 26 – Dominique Perreault, water polo player
- November 26 – Shannon Rempel, speed skater
- November 28 – Marc-André Fleury, ice hockey player
- December 21 – Sarah Mutch, model and actress

== Deaths ==
=== January to June ===
- February 7 – James Sinclair, politician, businessman and father of Margaret Sinclair, one-time wife of Prime Minister Pierre Trudeau, and grandfather of Justin Trudeau (born 1908)
- February 9 – William Earl Rowe, politician and 20th Lieutenant Governor of Ontario (born 1894)
- March 22 – Stanley Fox, politician (born 1906)
- March 26 – Bora Laskin, jurist and 14th Chief Justice of Canada (born 1912)
- March 30 – Gaëtan Dugas, early AIDS patient, the alleged and debunked Patient Zero for AIDS (born 1953)
- April 11 – Adhémar Raynault, politician and Mayor of Montreal (born 1891)
- May 17 – Gordon Sinclair, journalist, writer and commentator (born 1900)
- May 19 – Russell Paulley, politician (born 1909)
- May 30 – George Pearkes, politician, soldier and recipient of the Victoria Cross (born 1888)

=== July to December ===
- July 17 – Denise Morelle, actress and murder victim (born 1926)
- August 12 – Lenny Breau, guitarist (born 1941)
- September 25 – Walter Pidgeon, actor (born 1897)
- October 2 – Harry Strom, politician and 9th Premier of Alberta (born 1914)
- October 19 – Grant Notley, politician (born 1939)
- December 31 – Chester Ronning, diplomat and politician (born 1894)

== See also ==
- 1984 in Canadian television
- List of Canadian films of 1984
