= 1904 in Canada =

- Decades: 1880s; 1890s; 1900s; 1910s; 1920s
- See also: History of Canada; Timeline of Canadian history; List of years in Canada

Events from the year 1904 in Canada.

== Incumbents ==
=== Crown ===
- Monarch – Edward VII

=== Federal government ===
- Governor General – Gilbert Elliot-Murray-Kynynmound, 4th Earl of Minto (until December 10) then Albert Grey, 4th Earl Grey
- Prime Minister – Wilfrid Laurier
- Chief Justice – Henri Elzéar Taschereau (Quebec)
- Parliament – 9th (until 29 September)

=== Provincial governments ===
==== Lieutenant governors ====
- Lieutenant Governor of British Columbia – Henri-Gustave Joly de Lotbinière
- Lieutenant Governor of Manitoba – Daniel Hunter McMillan
- Lieutenant Governor of New Brunswick – Jabez Bunting Snowball
- Lieutenant Governor of Nova Scotia – Alfred Gilpin Jones
- Lieutenant Governor of Ontario – William Mortimer Clark
- Lieutenant Governor of Prince Edward Island – Peter A. McIntyre (until October 3) then Donald Alexander MacKinnon
- Lieutenant Governor of Quebec – Louis-Amable Jetté

==== Premiers ====
- Premier of British Columbia – Richard McBride
- Premier of Manitoba – Rodmond Roblin
- Premier of New Brunswick – Lemuel John Tweedie
- Premier of Nova Scotia – George Henry Murray
- Premier of Ontario – George William Ross
- Premier of Prince Edward Island – Arthur Peters
- Premier of Quebec – Simon-Napoléon Parent

=== Territorial governments ===
==== Commissioners ====
- Commissioner of Yukon – Frederick Tennyson Congdon (until October 29) then Zachary Taylor Wood (acting)

==== Lieutenant governors ====
- Lieutenant Governor of Keewatin – Daniel Hunter McMillan
- Lieutenant Governor of the North-West Territories – Amédée E. Forget

==== Premiers ====
- Premier of North-West Territories – Frederick Haultain

== Events ==
- April 8 – In the Lansdowne-Cambon Convention France gives up some of its longstanding rights in Newfoundland
- April 19 – The Great Toronto Fire destroys much of that city's downtown, but kills no one.
- June 24 – The North-West Mounted Police become the Royal Northwest Mounted Police
- September 10 – American criminal Bill Miner stages Canada's first-ever train robbery
- October 8 – Edmonton is incorporated as a city of the North-West Territories.

=== Full date unknown ===
- Henry Ford opens an automobile manufacturing plant in Windsor, Ontario
- Assiniboine Park in Winnipeg opens
- Creation of Marionville, Ontario, the only village (for now) that shares the 3 Canadian municipalities.

== Births ==
=== January to June ===
- January 3 – Caro Lamoureux, soprano (d. 1998)
- January 4 – Pegi Nicol MacLeod, artist (d.1949)
- January 14 – Walter Harris, politician and lawyer (d.1999)
- February 29 – Lloyd Stinson, politician (d.1976)
- March 6 – Farquhar Oliver, politician (d.1989)
- March 26 – Gustave Biéler, Special Operations Executive agent during World War II (d.1944)
- April 16 – Fifi D'Orsay, actress (d.1983)
- April 26 – Paul-Émile Léger, Cardinal of the Roman Catholic Church (d.1991)
- May 1 – Wally Downer, politician (d.1994)
- May 13 – Earle Birney, poet (d.1995)

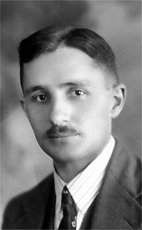
Eugene Forsey

- May 29 – Eugene Forsey, politician and constitutional expert (d.1991)
- June 26 – Frank Scott Hogg, astrophysicist (d.1951)

=== July to December ===
- July 22 – Donald O. Hebb, psychologist (d.1985)
- August 15 – George Klein, inventor (d. 1992)
- September 7 – Matthew Halton, radio and television journalist (d.1956)
- September 14 – Frank Amyot, sprint canoer and Olympic gold medallist (d.1962)
- September 23 – Geoffrey Waddington, conductor
- September 29 – Robert Legget, civil engineer, historian and non-fiction writer (d.1994)
- October 20 – Tommy Douglas, politician and Premier of Saskatchewan (d.1986)
- November 18 – Jean Paul Lemieux, painter (d.1990)
- November 26 – Armand Frappier, physician and microbiologist (d.1991)
- December 18 – Wilf Carter, country music singer, songwriter, guitarist and yodeller (d.1996)
- December 25 – Gerhard Herzberg, physicist and physical chemist (d.1999)
- December 28 – Bobbie Rosenfeld, athlete and Olympic gold medallist (d.1969)
- December 29 – Léo Gauthier, politician (d.1964)

== Deaths ==
- January 9 – Christian Kumpf, mayor of Waterloo, Ontario (b. 1838)
- February 9 – Erastus Wiman, journalist and businessman (b.1834)
- March 9 – Robert Machray, clergyman, missionary and first Primate of the Church of England in Canada (b.1831)
- April 17 – Joseph Brunet, politician and businessman (b.1834)
- May 11 – David Breakenridge Read, lawyer and 14th Mayor of Toronto (b. 1823)
- August 8 – James Cox Aikins, politician, Minister and Lieutenant-Governor of Manitoba (b.1823)
- August 31 – Jean-Baptiste Blanchet, politician (b.1842)
- September 26 – John Fitzwilliam Stairs, entrepreneur and statesman (b.1848)
