= 1981 in Canada =

- Decades: 1960s; 1970s; 1980s; 1990s; 2000s
- See also: History of Canada; Timeline of Canadian history; List of years in Canada

Events from the year 1981 in Canada.

== Incumbents ==
=== Crown ===
- Monarch – Elizabeth II

=== Federal government ===
- Governor General – Edward Schreyer
- Prime Minister – Pierre Trudeau
- Chief Justice – Bora Laskin (Ontario)
- Parliament – 32nd

=== Provincial governments ===
==== Lieutenant governors ====
- Lieutenant Governor of Alberta – Francis Charles Lynch-Staunton
- Lieutenant Governor of British Columbia – Henry Pybus Bell-Irving
- Lieutenant Governor of Manitoba – Francis Lawrence Jobin (until October 23) then Pearl McGonigal
- Lieutenant Governor of New Brunswick – Hédard Robichaud (until December 23) then George Stanley
- Lieutenant Governor of Newfoundland – Gordon Arnaud Winter (until July 10) then William Anthony Paddon
- Lieutenant Governor of Nova Scotia – John Elvin Shaffner
- Lieutenant Governor of Ontario – John Black Aird
- Lieutenant Governor of Prince Edward Island – Joseph Aubin Doiron
- Lieutenant Governor of Quebec – Jean-Pierre Côté
- Lieutenant Governor of Saskatchewan – Irwin McIntosh

==== Premiers ====
- Premier of Alberta – Peter Lougheed
- Premier of British Columbia – Bill Bennett
- Premier of Manitoba – Sterling Lyon (until November 30) then Howard Pawley
- Premier of New Brunswick – Richard Hatfield
- Premier of Newfoundland – Brian Peckford
- Premier of Nova Scotia – John Buchanan
- Premier of Ontario – Bill Davis
- Premier of Prince Edward Island – Angus MacLean (until November 17) then James Lee
- Premier of Quebec – René Lévesque
- Premier of Saskatchewan – Allan Blakeney

=== Territorial governments ===
==== Commissioners ====
- Commissioner of Yukon – Douglas Bell
- Commissioner of Northwest Territories – John Havelock Parker

==== Premiers ====
- Premier of the Northwest Territories – George Braden
- Premier of Yukon – Chris Pearson

== Events ==
- January 1 – Gasoline and diesel are sold by the litre rather than the gallon.
- February 5 – More than three hundred men are arrested after police sweeps of Toronto bathhouses. The arrests create an outcry among Canada's gay population, and become a historic turning point in Canadian LGBT history.
- March 19 – Ontario election: Bill Davis's PCs win a majority.
- June 4 – NABET employees at the Canadian Broadcasting Corporation hold a long strike, disrupting programming for much of the Spring.
- July 17 – The government of British Columbia name a 2,639-metre (8,658 ft) peak in the Rocky Mountains after Terry Fox.
- July 30 – The 83 km (52 mi) section of the Trans-Canada Highway in Ontario where Terry Fox was forced to end his run, was renamed in his honour.
- August – The prime rate hits a record high of 22.75%.
- September 1 – Quebec's French-language sign law comes into effect.
- September 1 – The Alberta and federal governments sign an energy agreement.
- September – The Canadian Radio-television and Telecommunications Commission holds pay-TV hearings in Hull, Quebec.
- September – West Edmonton Mall opens
- October 16 – Canada Post becomes a crown corporation.
- November 5 – In the Kitchen Accord, the federal government and all provinces except Quebec agree on how to patriate the Canadian Constitution.
- November 13 – The Canadarm is first deployed aboard the Space Shuttle.
- November 17 – James Lee becomes premier of Prince Edward Island, replacing Angus MacLean.
- November 30 – Howard Pawley becomes premier of Manitoba, replacing Sterling Lyon.

=== Full date unknown ===
- Power Corporation sells Canada Steamship Lines Inc. to Paul Martin and Laurence Pathy.
- News media: Now created.

== Arts and literature ==
=== New works ===
- Margaret Atwood - True Stories
- Bill Bissett - Northern Birds in Colour
- W.O. Mitchell - How I Spent My Summer Holidays
- Gordon R. Dickson - Lost Dorsai
- Nancy Huston - Les Variations Goldberg
- Joy Kogawa - Obasan

=== Awards ===
- See 1981 Governor General's Awards for a complete list of winners and finalists for those awards.
- Books in Canada First Novel Award: W.D. Valgardson, Gentle Sinners
- Gerald Lampert Award: Elizabeth Allan, The Shored Up House
- Marian Engel Award:
- Pat Lowther Award: M. Travis Lane, Divinations and Short Poems 1973-1978
- Stephen Leacock Award: Gary Lautens, Take My Family...Please!
- Vicky Metcalf Award: Monica Hughes

=== Film ===
- David Cronenberg's Scanners is released
- James Cameron's Piranha II: The Spawning, his first directing effort, is released
- Ladies and Gentlemen, The Fabulous Stains is released

== Sport ==
- March 2 – The Edmonton Drillers host Game 1 of the 1980–81 NASL indoor finals at Northlands Coliseum. They defeat the Chicago Sting 9–6.
- March 5 – The Edmonton Drillers win the 1980–81 NASL indoor title in Chicago by defeating the Chicago Sting 5–4 in Game 2 of the finals.
- March 15 – The Moncton Aigles Bleus win their first University Cup by defeating the Saskatchewan Huskies 4–2. The final game was played at the Stampede Corral in Calgary
- May 10 – The Cornwall Royals win their third (second consecutive) Memorial Cup by defeating the Kitchener Rangers 8–2. The final game was played at Windsor Arena in Windsor, Ontario
- May 13 – The original Montreal Allouettes cease operations
- May 14 – Montreal Concordes are established
- May 21 – Saint Boniface, Manitoba's Butch Goring of the New York Islanders is awarded the Conn Smythe Trophy
- July 21 – Quebec City's Rick Martel win his second World Wrestling Federation Tag Team Championship (with Tony Garea) by defeating the Moondogs in Allentown, Pennsylvania
- September 26 – Toronto hosts Soccer Bowl '81 at Exhibition Stadium. 36,971 fans witness Chicago defeat New York 1–0 in a shoot-out.
- September 28 – Calgary is awarded the 1988 Winter Olympics.
- November 22 – The Edmonton Eskimos win their eighth (fourth consecutive) Grey Cup by defeating the Ottawa Redblacks 26–23 in the 69th Grey Cup played at Olympic Stadium in Montreal. London, Ontario's Neil Lumsden won the game's Most Valuable Canadian
- November 28 – The Acadia Axemen win their second Vanier Cup by defeating the Alberta Golden Bears 18–12 in the 17th Vanier Cup played at Varsity Stadium in Toronto

== Births ==
- January 7 – Alex Auld, ice hockey player
- January 8 – Jeff Francis, baseball pitcher
- January 11 – Jonathan Mandick, rower
- January 15 – Dylan Armstrong, shot putter
- January 16 – Nic Youngblud, water polo player
- January 17 – Julien Cousineau, alpine skier
- January 20 – Owen Hargreaves, soccer player
- January 21 – Dany Heatley, ice hockey player
- February 13 – Kristina Kiss, soccer player
- February 19 – Shawn Spears, pro wrestler
- February 24 – Adam Kunkel, hurdler
- March 14 – Isabelle Pearson, judoka
- March 28 – Dan Petronijevic, actor
- April 6 – Auburn Sigurdson, softball player
- April 16 – Matthieu Proulx, football player
- April 19 – Hayden Christensen, actor
- April 29 – Oliver Bone, sailor
- May 8 – Blake Leibel, murderer
- May 15 – Justin Morneau, baseball player
- May 19 – Georges St-Pierre, mixed martial artist
- May 20 – Morgan Knabe, swimmer
- June 4 – Jennifer Carroll, swimmer
- June 21 – Kevin Mitchell, water polo player
- June 23 – Mikey Bustos, Filipino Canadian entertainer
- July 9 – Dylan Taylor, actor
- July 13 – Michael Mando, actor, writer and director
- July 21 – Anabelle Langlois, figure skater
- July 23 – Steve Jocz, drummer
- August 9 – Lauren Bay Regula, softball player
- August 19 – Taylor Pyatt, ice hockey player
- September 1 – Michael Adamthwaite, voice actor
- September 7
  - Annie Martin, beach volleyball player
  - Athena Karkanis, television, film and voice actress
- September 13 – Angelina Love, professional wrestler
- September 26 – Kaila Holtz, softball player
- October 3 – Amanda Walsh, actress
- October 4 – Justin Williams, ice hockey player
- October 8 – Raffi Torres, ice hockey player
- October 25 – Gary Reed, middle distance athlete
- October 30 – Shaun Sipos, actor
- November 4 – Paul Tucker comic-book artist
- November 20 – Christian Bernier, volleyball player

== Deaths ==
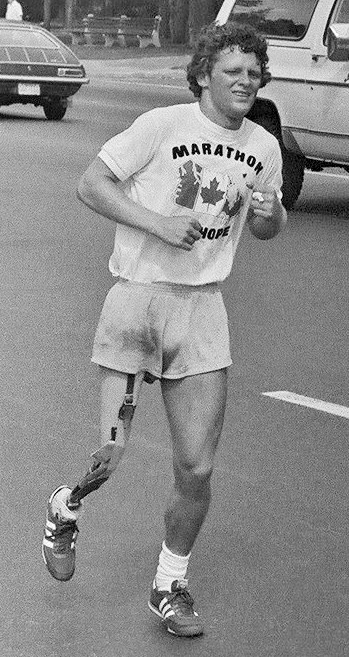
Terry Fox

- January 5 - Lomer Brisson, politician and lawyer (b. 1916)
- January 16 - John Oates Bower, politician, businessman and executive (b. 1901)
- April 10 - George Carlyle Marler, politician, notary and philatelist (b. 1901)
- May 4 - Samuel Rosborough Balcom, politician (b. 1888)
- May 23 - David Lewis, lawyer and politician (b. 1909)
- May 29 - Walter Russell Shaw, politician and Premier of Prince Edward Island (b. 1887)
- June 28 - Terry Fox, humanitarian, athlete and cancer treatment activist (b. 1958)
- September 23 - Chief Dan George, actor and author (b. 1899)
- November 3 - Thérèse Casgrain, feminist, reformer, politician and Senator (b. 1896)
- December 4 – Jovette Bernier, journalist, author and radio show host (b. 1900)
- December 28 - Allan Dwan, film director, producer and screenwriter (b. 1885)

== See also ==
- 1981 in Canadian television
- List of Canadian films of 1981
