= 1902 in Canada =

- Decades: 1880s; 1890s; 1900s; 1910s; 1920s
- See also: History of Canada; Timeline of Canadian history; List of years in Canada

Events from the year 1902 in Canada.

== Incumbents ==
=== Crown ===
- Monarch – Edward VII

=== Federal government ===
- Governor General – Gilbert Elliot-Murray-Kynynmound, 4th Earl of Minto
- Prime Minister – Wilfrid Laurier
- Chief Justice – Samuel Henry Strong (Ontario) (until 18 November) then Henri Elzéar Taschereau (Quebec)
- Parliament – 9th

=== Provincial governments ===
==== Lieutenant governors ====
- Lieutenant Governor of British Columbia – Henri-Gustave Joly de Lotbinière
- Lieutenant Governor of Manitoba – Daniel Hunter McMillan
- Lieutenant Governor of New Brunswick – Abner Reid McClelan (until January 28) then Jabez Bunting Snowball
- Lieutenant Governor of Nova Scotia – Alfred Gilpin Jones
- Lieutenant Governor of Ontario – Oliver Mowat
- Lieutenant Governor of Prince Edward Island – Peter Adolphus McIntyre
- Lieutenant Governor of Quebec – Louis-Amable Jetté

==== Premiers ====
- Premier of British Columbia – James Dunsmuir (until November 21) then Edward Prior
- Premier of Manitoba – Rodmond Roblin
- Premier of New Brunswick – Lemuel John Tweedie
- Premier of Nova Scotia – George Henry Murray
- Premier of Ontario – George William Ross
- Premier of Prince Edward Island – Arthur Peters
- Premier of Quebec – Simon-Napoléon Parent

=== Territorial governments ===
==== Commissioners ====
- Commissioner of Yukon – James Hamilton Ross (until February 8) then Henry W. Newlands (acting) (February 8 to August 15) then Zachary Taylor Wood (acting)

==== Lieutenant governors ====
- Lieutenant Governor of Keewatin – Daniel Hunter McMillan
- Lieutenant Governor of the North-West Territories – Amédée E. Forget

==== Premiers ====
- Premier of the North-West Territories – Frederick Haultain

== Events ==
- February – The town of Crofton, British Columbia, is founded on Vancouver Island
- May 21 – 1902 Northwest Territories general election
- May 24 – The first Victoria Day is celebrated
- May 29 – 1902 Ontario general election: G. W. Ross's Liberals win a second consecutive majority. Margaret Haile runs as a candidate of the Canadian Socialist League in Toronto North, becoming the first woman ever to stand in a provincial election.
- May 31 – The Second Boer War ends
- July 1 – Ray Knight stages the first Raymond Stampede in Raymond, Alberta. This was the first use of the word stampede in the name of a rodeo. The Raymond Stampede is now Canada's oldest rodeo
- August 9 – Edward VII is crowned King of the United Kingdom and of Canada.
- October 10 – Altona schoolhouse shooting
- October 20 – The first train enters Edmonton, by way of the Canadian Northern's Edmonton, Yukon and Pacific Railway across the Low Level Bridge
- November 21 – Edward Prior becomes Premier of British Columbia, replacing James Dunsmuir
- December 15 – The first transatlantic radio press report is filed from Glace Bay, Nova Scotia.
- The first ascent of Mount Forbes by James Outram and party

== Arts and literature ==
- The first symphony orchestra in Canada begins in Quebec City.
- The first movie theatre in Canada opens in Vancouver

== Births ==
=== January to June ===
- January 22 – Jean-Paul Beaulieu, politician and chartered accountant (d.1976)
- February 17 – Howard O'Hagan, writer (d.1982)
- April 14 – Olive Diefenbaker, wife of John Diefenbaker, 13th Prime Minister of Canada (d.1976)
- April 20 – Elizabeth Goudie, writer (d.1982)
- May 24 – Sylvia Daoust, sculptor (d.2004)
- June 17 – Anna Hilliard, doctor
- June 19 – Guy Lombardo, bandleader and violinist (d.1977)
- June 21 – Howie Morenz, ice hockey player (d.1937)

=== July to December ===
- July 15 – Donald Creighton, historian (d.1979)
- July 30 – Dorise Nielsen, politician (d.1980)
- August 10 – Norma Shearer, Academy Award-winning actress (d.1983)
- September 2 – Peter Pitseolak, Inuit photographer and author (d.1973)
- November 8 – A. J. M. Smith, poet (d.1980)
- November 21 – Foster Hewitt, radio pioneer (d.1985)
- December 29 – Nels Stewart, ice hockey player (d.1957)

== Deaths ==
- February 12 – Frederick Hamilton-Temple-Blackwood, 1st Marquess of Dufferin and Ava, Governor General of Canada (b.1826)
- February 19 – Richard Maurice Bucke, psychiatrist (b.1837)
- August 5 – Thomas Christie, physician, professor and politician (b.1834)
- August 10 – James McMillan, United States Senator from Michigan from 1889 until 1902. (b.1838)
- October 31 – John A. Dawson, politician (b.1826)
