= 1837 in Canada =

- Decades: 1810s; 1820s; 1830s; 1840s; 1850s
- See also: History of Canada; Timeline of Canadian history; List of years in Canada

Events from the year 1837 in Canada.

== Incumbents ==
- Monarch: William IV (until June 20), then Victoria

=== Federal government ===
- Parliament of Lower Canada: 15th
- Parliament of Upper Canada: 13th

=== Governors ===
- Governor of the Canadas: Robert Milnes
- Governor of New Brunswick: George Stracey Smyth
- Governor of Nova Scotia: John Coape Sherbrooke
- Commodore-Governor of Newfoundland: Richard Goodwin Keats
- Governor of Prince Edward Island: Charles Douglass Smith

== Events ==
- British attempts to unite the colonies of Upper and Lower Canada lead to revolt. Two separate rebellions, one in Upper and one in Lower Canada, fail to dislodge entrenched elites.
- Along with a general feeling that the government was not democratic, the failure of the executive committee to maintain the confidence of the elected officials leads to violent but unsuccessful rebellions in Upper and Lower Canada. The leaders, William Lyon Mackenzie (Reformers) and Louis-Joseph Papineau (Patriotes), both escape to the U.S.
- Revolts in Upper and Lower Canada. Small businessmen and farmers against merchant elites who, as political leaders, are raising property taxes, tariffs and freight rates to raise money for canals.
- Black militia units participate in putting down the rebellion in Upper Canada.
- British parliament passes Coercion Bill, seizes Lower Canada treasury.
- Chartists organize support in England.
- May – 1837 Newfoundland general election.
- July 31 – Declaration of Toronto Reformers followed by 200 township meetings.
- August 26 – Lord Gosford prorogues Parliament by proclamation. Mr. Papineau finds a copy on his seat, on returning from the audience hall.
- Lord Gosford is now convinced that it is intended to institute a republican form of government, in Canada. Justices of the Peace and officers of Militia are removed from office: Mr. Papineau among them.
- The newspaper Le Populaire is started, at Montreal, to quiet the public mind; and, at Quebec, the Liberal, a seditious journal.
- The Governor warns the people against rebellion.
- Messrs. Papineau, Lafontaine, Girouard and Morin go through the country, exciting the inhabitants.
- An effigy of the Governor is burnt.
- Mr. Lafontaine says "We have demanded reforms, without obtaining them. It is time to be up and doing."
- Lord Gosford proposes adding seven Frenchmen to the Legislative Council and nine to the Executive Council.
- Société des Fils de la Liberté ("Sons of Liberty") secretly drill and prepare munitions; but many of the French remain loyal.
- Among the malcontents are Dr. Nelson, Messrs. Papineau, Wilson, Viger, Lacoste, Brown, and Girod.
- Alarmed at the length excitement has carried him, Mr. Papineau now inclines to the constitutional remedy of ceasing to trade with England, but Dr. Nelson declares that the time for action has come.
- The Roman Catholic Bishop Lartigue, of Montreal, preaches obedience to authority, as a cardinal rule of the Church.
- The R. C. Bishop Signai, of Quebec, warns his flock against revolt, and reminds them that, even in France, where sovereignty resides in the people, it rests, not with a part, but with the whole population; and "who will dare to say that the whole population of this country desire the overthrow of the Government?"
- General Colborne speedily arms 600 inhabitants, and regulars are called from New Brunswick.
- November – William Lyon Mackenzie presents plans to overthrow the government.
- November 6 – In Montreal, the Doric Club come to blows with "Sons of Liberty."
- The military march through the streets with guns.
- November 23 – Patriotes defeat British army at St. Denis, Lower Canada. At St. Denis, Col. Gore, with five companies of regulars, fails to dislodge rebel Dr. Nelson, with 200 men, behind walls.
- For safety, Mr. Papineau is induced to cross the Line.
- November 24 – William Lyon Mackenzie delivers order to local leaders to march on Toronto December 7.
- November 25 – British defeat Patriotes at St. Charles and return to burn St. Denis.
- November 25 – Col. Wetherall's 400 defeat a larger number of rebels, of whom about 100 are killed, 372 wounded, and 30 surrender. At St. Eustache, over 1,200 rebels, under Dr. Chenier and Girod, a Swiss, dwindle to 250. A priest tries to dissuade Dr. Chenier, who replies, with a trea, "I will conquer, or die."
- Sir John Colborne, with 2,000 and field-pieces, wins the battle. To unarmed followers Dr. Chenier has said: "Be easy; some will be killed – you can take their muskets." True, there are muskets to spare, but the men to use them are wanting. Girod shoots himself.
- T.S. Brown and Dr. O'Callaghan cross the Line.
- At St. Benoid, 250 men surrender to Sir John Colborne.
- People return thanks for peace, and promise loyalty.
- Mr. Lafontaine too tardily asks the Governor to summon Parliament. He refuses. Arrests are made on charge of High Treason.
- Rolph panics, calls troops out for December 4.
- December 2 – Troops occupy St. Denis.
- December 4 – Confrontation at Montgomery's Tavern. See https://web.archive.org/web/20080511160744/https://www.edunetconnect.com/cat/rebellions/1837f01.html
- December 5 – Lord Gosford proclaims martial law.
- December 6 – Battle of Mississquoi Bay.
- December 7 – Rebels are defeated, at Toronto.
- December 7 – Loyalist militia defeats Patriots at Toronto. William Lyon Mackenzie escapes to the U.S.
- December 9 – Peter Matthews captured.
- Charles Duncombe leads Patriot uprising in London District.
- December 13 – Revolutionary Provisional Government established at Navy Island.
- December 13 – Governor-General Colborne leads British assault on Two Mountains Country, Lower Canada.
- December 14 – Rebels are defeated, at St. Eustache, Jean-Olivier Chénier is killed
- December 15 – Rebels surrender, at Grade Brule.
- December 16 – William Lyon MacKenzie occupies Navy Island and proclaims the short-lived Republic of Canada.

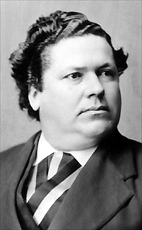
Joseph-Alfred Mousseau

- December 29 – The Patriot steamer "Caroline" is burned in the Niagara River at Niagara Falls.
- In the course of this year, steam is adopted as the motive power, on the Champlain & St. Lawrence Railway.
- Unlike Upper and Lower Canada, other Canadian territories move toward responsible government without rebellion. New Brunswick accepts the British offer to allow their assembly more revenue control over salaries of public servants and judges. Nova Scotia agrees to the same conditions in 1839.

== Births ==
- January 22 – Charles Alphonse Pantaléon Pelletier, lawyer, militia officer, politician, publisher, judge, and the 9th Lieutenant Governor of Quebec (died 1911)
- January 23 – Agnes Maule Machar, author (died 1927)
- March 18 – Richard Maurice Bucke, psychiatrist (died 1902)
- May 20 – William Jackman, sailor

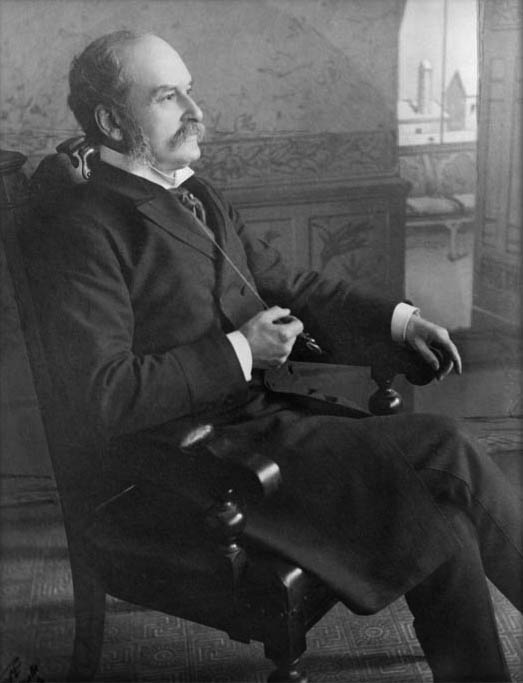
Arthur Sturgis Hardy

- July 18 – Joseph-Alfred Mousseau, politician and 6th Premier of Quebec (died 1886)
- September 1 – Christopher William Bunting, politician, merchant, newspaper owner and newspaper publisher (died 1896)
- December – Gabriel Dumont, Metis leader (died 1906)
- December 14 – Arthur Sturgis Hardy, lawyer, politician and 4th Premier of Ontario (died 1901)

== Deaths ==
- July 13 – Charles James Stewart, clergyman of the Church of England, bishop, and politician (born 1775)
- December 14 – Jean-Olivier Chénier, physician and Patriote (born 1806)
- Richard Pierpoint, black loyalist.
