= 1901 in Canada =

- Decades: 1880s; 1890s; 1900s; 1910s; 1920s
- See also: History of Canada; Timeline of Canadian history; List of years in Canada

Events from the year 1901 in Canada.

== Incumbents ==
=== Crown ===
- Monarch – Victoria (until January 22), then Edward VII

=== Federal government ===
- Governor General – Gilbert Elliot-Murray-Kynynmound, 4th Earl of Minto
- Prime Minister – Wilfrid Laurier
- Chief Justice – Samuel Henry Strong (Ontario)
- Parliament – 9th (from 6 February)

=== Provincial governments ===
==== Lieutenant governors ====
- Lieutenant Governor of British Columbia – Henri-Gustave Joly de Lotbinière
- Lieutenant Governor of Manitoba – Daniel Hunter McMillan
- Lieutenant Governor of New Brunswick – Jabez Bunting Snowball
- Lieutenant Governor of Nova Scotia – Alfred Gilpin Jones
- Lieutenant Governor of Ontario – Oliver Mowat
- Lieutenant Governor of Prince Edward Island – Peter Adolphus McIntyre
- Lieutenant Governor of Quebec – Louis-Amable Jetté

==== Premiers ====
- Premier of British Columbia – Edward Gawler Prior
- Premier of Manitoba – Rodmond Roblin
- Premier of New Brunswick – Lemuel John Tweedie
- Premier of Nova Scotia – George Henry Murray
- Premier of Ontario – George William Ross
- Premier of Prince Edward Island – Donald Farquharson (until December 29) then Arthur Peters
- Premier of Quebec – Simon-Napoléon Parent

=== Territorial governments ===
==== Commissioners ====
- Commissioner of Yukon – William Ogilvie (until March 11) then James Hamilton Ross

==== Lieutenant governors ====
- Lieutenant Governor of Keewatin – Daniel Hunter McMillan
- Lieutenant Governor of the North-West Territories – Amédée E. Forget

==== Premiers ====
- Premier of North-West Territories – Frederick Haultain

== Events ==
- January 22 – Death of Queen Victoria and accession of King Edward VII.
- September 16 – The Duke and Duchess of Cornwall and York (later King George V and Queen Mary) arrive in Quebec City. They visit all provinces (except Prince Edward Island) and the districts of Assiniboia and Alberta in the North-West Territories. They also visit Newfoundland before leaving North America.
- December 12 — Guglielmo Marconi receives a transatlantic radio message at St. John's, Newfoundland.
- December 18 — The Territorial Grain Growers' Association is founded.
- December 29 — Arthur Peters becomes Premier of Prince Edward Island, replacing Donald Farquharson.
- First ascent of Mount Assiniboine by James Outram's party.
- The 1901 Canadian census took place, having a large focus on the labour force, income, and wage class.

== Arts and literature ==
- March 22 — Gabrielle Roy, a prominent French Canadian author, was born. She would go on to become one of Canada's most celebrated writers.
- October 24 — Sheila Watson, a Canadian novelist and critic, was born. She is best known for her novel "The Double Hook".

== Births ==
=== January to June ===
- January 12 — Jack Humphrey, painter (d.1967)
- January 14 — Dana Porter, politician and jurist (d.1967)
- January 29 — E. P. Taylor, business tycoon and race horse breeder (d.1989)

Dr. W.R. Franks

- February 6 — Pat Harrington Sr., actor (d. 1965)
- March 4 — Wilbur R. Franks, scientist and inventor (d.1986)
- March 25 — Wilfrid Eggleston, journalist and chief censor for Canada from 1942 until 1944 (d.1985)
- April 15 — Thomas Ricketts, soldier and Victoria Cross recipient in 1918 (d.1967)
- May 5 — Donald Buchanan Blue, politician

=== July to December ===
- July 15 — James Litterick, politician
- September 8 — Harold Connolly, journalist, newspaper editor, politician and Premier of Nova Scotia (d.1980)
- September 12 — Ben Blue, Canadian-born comedian, actor (d. 1975)
- September 14 — George Carlyle Marler, politician, notary and philatelist (d.1981)
- September 15 — Gweneth Lloyd, choreographer
- September 22 — Charles Brenton Huggins, physician, physiologist, cancer researcher and Nobel prize laureate (d.1997)
- October 14 — John Oates Bower, politician, businessman and executive (d.1981)

=== Full date unknown ===
- Maryon Pearson, wife of Lester B. Pearson, 14th Prime Minister of Canada (d.1989)

== Deaths ==
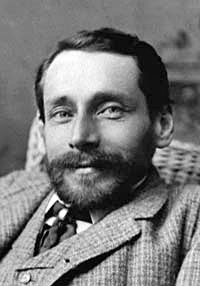
George M. Dawson in May 1885.

- January 22 — Victoria, Queen of Canada, since 1867 (b.1819)
- March 2 — George Mercer Dawson, scientist and surveyor (b.1849)
- May 4 — John Jones Ross, politician and Premier of Quebec (b.1831)
- May 7 — George Edwin King, jurist, politician and 2nd Premier of New Brunswick (b.1839)
- June 13 — Arthur Sturgis Hardy, lawyer, politician and 4th Premier of Ontario (b.1837)

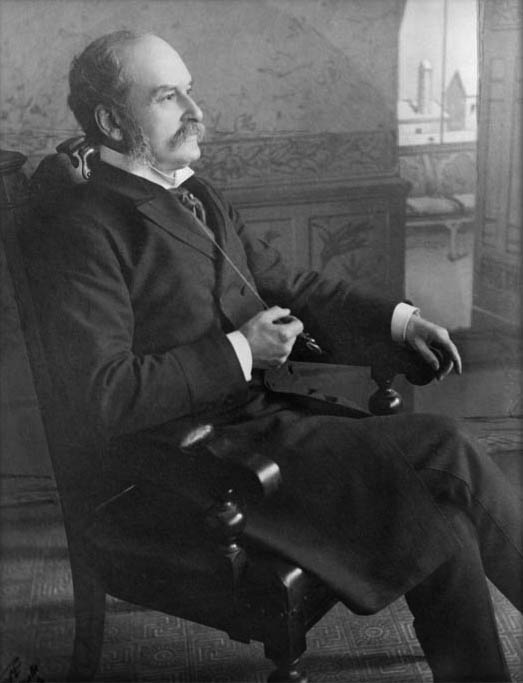
Arthur Sturgis Hardy

- July 24 — George William Allan, politician and 11th Mayor of Toronto (b.1822)
- October 25 — Colin MacDougall, politician and lawyer (b.1834)
