= 1982 in Canada =

- Decades: 1960s; 1970s; 1980s; 1990s; 2000s
- See also: History of Canada; Timeline of Canadian history; List of years in Canada

Events from the year 1982 in Canada.

== Incumbents ==
=== Crown ===
- Monarch – Elizabeth II

=== Federal government ===
- Governor General – Edward Schreyer
- Prime Minister – Pierre Trudeau
- Chief Justice – Bora Laskin (Ontario)
- Parliament – 32nd

=== Provincial governments ===
==== Lieutenant governors ====
- Lieutenant Governor of Alberta – Francis Charles Lynch-Staunton
- Lieutenant Governor of British Columbia – Henry Pybus Bell-Irving
- Lieutenant Governor of Manitoba – Pearl McGonigal
- Lieutenant Governor of New Brunswick – George Stanley
- Lieutenant Governor of Newfoundland – William Anthony Paddon
- Lieutenant Governor of Nova Scotia – John Elvin Shaffner
- Lieutenant Governor of Ontario – John Black Aird
- Lieutenant Governor of Prince Edward Island – Joseph Aubin Doiron
- Lieutenant Governor of Quebec – Jean-Pierre Côté
- Lieutenant Governor of Saskatchewan – Irwin McIntosh

==== Premiers ====
- Premier of Alberta – Peter Lougheed
- Premier of British Columbia – Bill Bennett
- Premier of Manitoba – Howard Pawley
- Premier of New Brunswick – Richard Hatfield
- Premier of Newfoundland – Brian Peckford
- Premier of Nova Scotia – John Buchanan
- Premier of Ontario – Bill Davis
- Premier of Prince Edward Island – James Lee
- Premier of Quebec – René Lévesque
- Premier of Saskatchewan – Allan Blakeney (Until May 8) then Grant Devine

=== Territorial governments ===
==== Commissioners ====
- Commissioner of Yukon – Douglas Bell
- Commissioner of Northwest Territories – John Havelock Parker

==== Premiers ====
- Premier of the Northwest Territories – George Braden
- Premier of Yukon – Chris Pearson

== Events ==
=== January to June ===
- January 11 – CBC's The National moves to 10 p.m. and The Journal debuts at 10:22 p.m.
- January 15 – Striking Quebec transit workers are forced back to work.
- February – First reported cases of AIDS in Canada.
- February 15 – 84 are killed when the Ocean Ranger oil platform capsizes.
- March 4 – Bertha Wilson is appointed Canada's first female Supreme Court justice.
- March 8 – The Canada Act is passed by the British House of Commons.
- April 14 – 1982 Northwest Territories division plebiscite
- April 17 – In an outdoor ceremony in Ottawa, Queen Elizabeth II signs a royal proclamation that completes patriation of the constitution, and the Constitution Act, 1982, including the Charter of Rights and Freedoms, comes into effect.
- April 26 – Saskatchewan election: Grant Devine's PCs win a landslide majority, defeating Allan Blakeney's NDP.
- May 5 – Peru requests Canadian intervention in the ongoing Falklands War.
- May 8 – Grant Devine becomes Premier of Saskatchewan after defeating Allan Blakeney's NDP.
- May 23 – André Besette beatified by the Pope.
- June 12 – The first drawing of Lotto 6/49 occurs with a jackpot of CA$500,000 (equivalent to $1,500,000 in 2025). Winning numbers are 03, 11, 12, 14, 41, 43, bonus 13.
- June 28 – Access to Information Act passed.

=== July to December ===
- July 15 – Anik 1, Canada's first communications satellite, is retired after ten years' service.
- July 26 – Karen Baldwin is crowned Miss Universe in Lima, Peru, becoming the first Canadian to win this award.
- August 16 – Communications satellite Anik D launched.
- August 23 – Turkish military attaché to Canada, Colonel Atilla Altıkat, is assassinated by Justice Commandos of the Armenian Genocide in Ottawa.
- October 5 – Laurie Skreslet becomes the first Canadian to climb Mount Everest.
- October 27 – Dominion Day renamed Canada Day.
- October 31 – Marguerite Bourgeoys becomes Canada's first female saint.
- November 2 – Alberta election: Peter Lougheed's PCs win a fourth consecutive majority.
- December 10 – Canada's 200 nautical mile (370 km) limit is officially recognized.

=== Full date unknown ===
- The year sees a severe recession in the economy.
- In a case concerning the development of the Hibernia Oil Field the Supreme Court rules that the continental shelf falls under federal jurisdiction.
- Ed Mirvish purchases London's Old Vic theatre.
- Colin Thatcher is elected to his third term in the Saskatchewan Legislative Assembly, where he is appointed Minister of Energy and Mines.

== Arts and literature ==
=== New books ===
- Dig up My Heart: Milton Acorn

=== Awards ===
- See 1982 Governor General's Awards for a complete list of winners and finalists for those awards.
- Books in Canada First Novel Award: Joy Kogawa, Obasan
- Gerald Lampert Award: Abraham Boyarsky, Schielber and Edna Alford, A Sleep Full of Dreams
- Pat Lowther Award: Rona Murray, Journey
- Stephen Leacock Award: Mervyn J. Huston, Gophers Don't Pay Taxes Tree
- Vicky Metcalf Award: Janet Lunn

=== Film ===
- 'E' released

=== Dance ===
- Arnold Spohr wins the Dancemagazine Award

== Sports ==
- March 14 – The Moncton Aigles Bleus win their second (consecutive) University Cup be defeating the Saskatchewan Huskies 3 to 2. The final game was played in the Moncton Coliseum in Moncton, New Brunswick
- May 9 – Gilles Villeneuve is killed at the Belgian Grand Prix.
- May 15 – The Kitchener Rangers win their first Memorial Cup by defeating the Sherbrooke Castors 7 to 4. The final game was played at Robert Guertin Arena in Hull, Quebec
- May 16 – The New York Islanders win their third (consecutive) Stanley Cup by defeating the Vancouver Canucks 4 games to 0. The deciding Game 4 was played at Pacific Coliseum in Vancouver. Montreal's Mike Bossy was awarded the Conn Smythe Trophy
- November 20 – The UBC Thunderbirds win their first Vanier Cup by defeating the Western Ontario Mustangs by a score of 39–14 in the 18th Vanier Cup played at Varsity Stadium in Toronto
- November 28 – The Edmonton Eskimos win their ninth (fifth consecutive) Grey Cup by defeating the Toronto Argonauts in the 70th Grey Cup played at Exhibition Stadium in Toronto

== Births ==
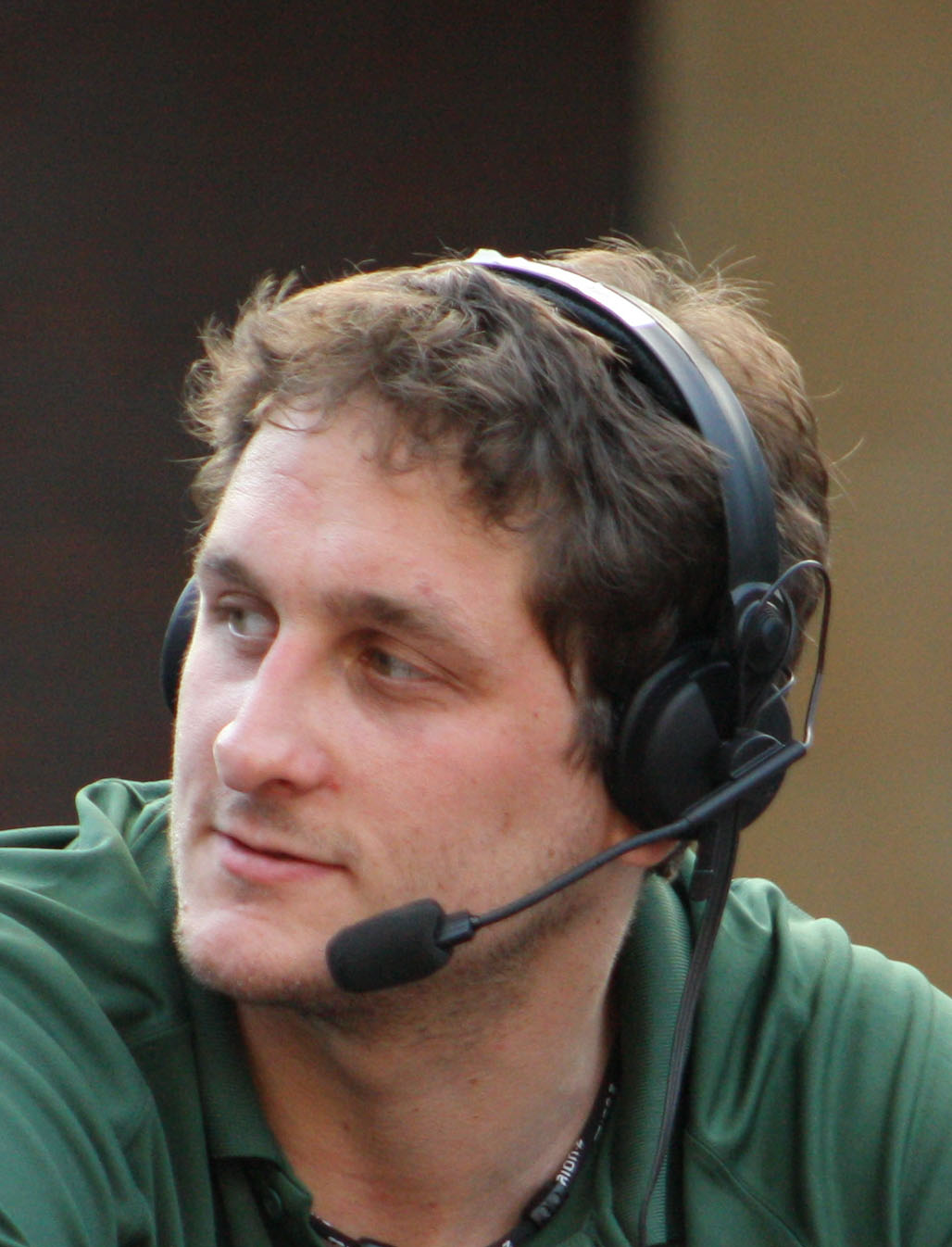
Derek Boogaard, hockey player

- January 5 – Tiiu Nurmberg, skier
- January 12 – Shawn Desman, pop musician
- January 31 – Jay Malinowski musician
- March 10 – Kathleen Stoody, swimmer
- March 18 – Matthew Lombardi, ice hockey player
- March 30 – A-Trak, DJ and turntablist
- April 3 – Cobie Smulders, actress and model
- April 9 – Jay Baruchel, actor and comedian
- April 14 – Lise Leveille, gymnast
- April 15 – Seth Rogen, actor, comedian, and filmmaker
- April 16 – Aaron Feltham, water polo player
- April 24 – Shayna Nackoney, synchronized swimmer
- May 6 – Kyle Shewfelt, gymnast
- May 10 – Adam Sioui, swimmer
- May 11 – Cory Monteith, actor (d. 2013)
- May 12 – Rhian Wilkinson, soccer player
- May 16 – Melissa Altro, actress
- May 23 – Linda Consolante, soccer player
- May 27 – Natalya Neidhart, pro wrestler
- June 9 – Rachel Schill, softball player
- June 16 – Kathy Tremblay, triathlete
- June 23 – Derek Boogaard, hockey player (d. 2011)
- June 24 – Jarret Stoll, ice hockey player
- July 6 – Kelly Stefanyshyn, swimmer
- July 8 – Ariel Helwani, combat sports commentator
- July 9 – Viola Yanik, wrestler
- July 17 – Jessi Cruickshank, television host
- August 20 – Meghan Ory, actress
- August 21 – Omar Sachedina, journalist and news anchor
- September 1 – Jeffrey Buttle, figure skater, Olympic bronze medallist and World Champion
- September 2 – Kelly Haxton, soccer player
- September 9 – Niki Ashton, politician
- September 21 – Cindy Eadie, softball player
- September 23 – Shyla Stylez, porn actress (d. 2017)
- October 29 – Chelan Simmons, actress
- October 31 – Justin Chatwin, actor
- November 26 – Alison Braden, water polo player
- November 29 – Elizabeth Collins, swimmer
- December 22 – Brooke Nevin, actress
- December 29 – Brian Hill, Paralympic swimmer
- December 30 – Kristin Kreuk, actress

=== Full date unknown ===
- July – Gregory Despres, murderer
- Ryan Riordon, politician

== Deaths ==
=== January to June ===
- January 5 – Elizabeth Bagshaw, doctor (b.1881)
- March 28 – William Giauque, chemist and Nobel laureate (b.1895)
- May 8 – Gilles Villeneuve, motor racing driver (b.1950).
- June 10 – Elizabeth Goudie, writer (b.1902).
- June 28 – Igor Gouzenko, Russian defector (b.1919)

=== July to December ===
- July 25 – Hal Foster, cartoonist (b.1892)
- October 4 – Glenn Gould, pianist (b.1932)
- October 16 – Hugh John Flemming, politician and 24th Premier of New Brunswick (b.1899)
- October 16 – Hans Selye, endocrinologist (b.1907)
- October 18 – John Robarts, lawyer, politician and 17th Premier of Ontario (b.1917)
- November 2 – J. Dewey Soper, Arctic explorer, zoologist, ornithologist and author (b.1893)
- November 19 – Erving Goffman, sociologist and writer (b.1922)
- November 29 – Percy Williams, athlete and double Olympic gold medallist (b.1908)
- December 2 – Honore Brenot, professional ice hockey player (b. 1899)
- December 7 – Harry Jerome, track and field runner (b.1940)
- December 19 – George Isaac Smith, lawyer, politician and Premier of Nova Scotia (b.1909)

== See also ==
- 1982 in Canadian television
- List of Canadian films of 1982
