= 1836 in Canada =

- Decades: 1810s; 1820s; 1830s; 1840s; 1850s
- See also: History of Canada; Timeline of Canadian history; List of years in Canada

Events from the year 1836 in Canada.

== Incumbents ==
- Monarch: William IV

=== Federal government ===
- Parliament of Lower Canada: 15th
- Parliament of Upper Canada: 12th (until March 8), 13th (starting November 8)

=== Governors ===
- Governor of the Canadas: Earl of Gosford
- Governor of New Brunswick: Sir Archibald Campbell, 1st Baronet
- Governor of Nova Scotia: Henry Prescott
- Commodore-Governor of Newfoundland: Henry Prescott
- Governor of Prince Edward Island: George Wright
- Governor of Upper Canada: John Colborne then Francis Bond Head

== Events ==
- January – Book by Maria Monk claims that she was sexually exploited in a Canadian convent
- February – Lord Aberdeen approves of Lord Aylmer's conduct. The Governor declares that, in filling offices, he has more considered qualifications than nationality; that 80, of 142, places of emolument, and 295 of 580 unsalaried offices, are filled by Frenchmen.
- Lieutenant-Governor Francis Bond Head dissolves parliament and calls a new election.
- July 4 – First issue of The Constitution published.
- July 21 – Opening of the Champlain and St. Lawrence Railroad, the first public railway in Canada.
- August – The Commission reaches Quebec, and consists of Lord Gosford, Sir Charles Grey and Sir James Gipps. A congratulatory address is presented to them at Quebec.
- October – Lord Gosford informs Parliament of the purposes of the Commission and of the intended changes. He exhorts members to be conciliatory, saying: "Consider the blessings you might enjoy, but for your dissensions. Offspring, as you are, of the two foremost nations of the earth, you hold a vast and beautiful country, having a fertile soil, with a healthful climate, while the noblest river in the world makes seaports of your remote havens."
- November
  - Commissioner Grey embarks for England.
  - 1836 Newfoundland general election
- Mr. Papineau's following is 40 to 27, of the House. Mr. Papineau declares "Our task is not light, indeed, for we are called on to defend the rights of all British Colonial dependencies, as well as that we inhabit. The same evil genius, whose workings drove provincials of the neighboring States, unwittingly into the paths of a righteous and glorious resistance, presides over our affairs also. ...These Commissioners' instructions imply refusal, of those who prepared them, to listen heedfully to any representation of the many grievances either Canada has to complain of."
- Eastern Townships, members desert Mr. Papineau.
- Lord Gosford disappointedly declares "I will not predict all the consequences which may result from the factious opposition."
- In Upper Canada the 92 resolutions are expunged from the journals.

== Births ==
- January 20 – Robert Beaven, businessman, politician and 6th Premier of British Columbia (died 1920)
- March 28 – Robert Thorburn, merchant, politician and Premier of Newfoundland (died 1906)
- May 24 – William Mortimer Clark, lawyer, politician and Lieutenant Governor of Ontario (died 1915)
- August 24 – Agnes Macdonald, 1st Baroness Macdonald of Earnscliffe, second wife of John A. Macdonald, first Prime Minister of Canada (died 1920)
- September 25 – James Macleod, militia officer, lawyer, police officer, magistrate, judge and politician (died 1894)
- October 7 – Henri Elzéar Taschereau, jurist and 4th Chief Justice of Canada (died 1911)
- December 4 – Charles Augustus Semlin, politician and Premier of British Columbia (died 1927)
- December 11 – George Gerald King, politician (died 1928)

=== Full date unknown ===
- Robert Boston, politician (died 1922)
