= 1839 in Canada =

- Decades: 1810s; 1820s; 1830s; 1840s; 1850s
- See also: History of Canada; Timeline of Canadian history; List of years in Canada

Events from the year 1839 in Canada.

== Incumbents ==
- Monarch: Victoria

=== Federal government ===
- Parliament of Upper Canada: 13th

=== Governors ===
- Governor of the Canadas: John Lambton, 1st Earl of Durham then Charles Poulett Thomson, 1st Baron Sydenham
- Governor of New Brunswick: John Harvey
- Governor of Nova Scotia: Colin Campbell
- Commodore-Governor of Newfoundland: Henry Prescott
- Governor of Prince Edward Island: Charles Douglass Smith
- Governor of Upper Canada: George Arthur then Charles Poulett Thomson

== Events ==
- February 15 – Chevalier DeLorimier and others who joined in the Rebellion are executed.
- April 11 – Death of John Galt, novelist, one of the originators of the British American Land Company.
- June 24 – Last meeting of the Committee of Trade, forerunner of the Board of Trade.
- September 19 – Opening of the Albion Mines Railway in Nova Scotia, an early Canadian steam-driven mining railway
- September 26 – Canadian rebels are transported to New South Wales.
- October 19 – Charles Thomson, Governor of Upper and Lower Canada, arrives. It is determined that Upper and Lower Canada shall share revenue in the ratio of 2 to 3.

=== Full date unknown ===
- Lord Durham's report recommends the establishment of responsible government and the union of Upper and Lower Canada to speed the assimilation of French-speaking Canadians.
- Territorial disputes between lumbermen from Maine and New Brunswick lead to armed conflict in the Aroostook River valley (the Aroostook War).
- First Horse Railway in Upper Canada.
- Mount Allison University founded by Charles Frederick Allison in Sackville, New Brunswick.

== Births ==
- January 1 – Annie L. Jack, author
- January 29 – Élie Saint-Hilaire, educator, farmer and politician (died 1888)
- May 8 – Adolphe-Basile Routhier, judge, author and lyricist (died 1920)
- May 31 – Louis-Alphonse Boyer, politician (died 1916)
- October 8 – George Edwin King, jurist, politician and 2nd Premier of New Brunswick (died 1901)
- September 17 – Antonin Nantel, priest, teacher, school administrator, and author (died 1929)
- November 16 – Louis-Honoré Fréchette, poet, politician, playwright and short story writer (died 1908)

=== Full date unknown ===
- Augustus F. Goodridge, politician and Premier of Newfoundland (died 1920)
- James Colebrooke Patterson, politician, Minister and Lieutenant-Governor of Manitoba (died 1929)

== Deaths ==
- September 18 – Jeanne-Charlotte Allamand, pioneer, educator and artist (b. 1760 in Switzerland)
