= Auguste Achintre =

Canadian journalist and essayist (1834-1886)

Auguste Achintre (19 March 1834 – 25 June 1886), baptized Joseph-Frédéric-Auguste, was a Canadian journalist and essayist.

== Early life ==
Achintre was born in Besançon, France, on 19 March 1834 to Guillaume-Auguste Achintre, a pharmacist, and Anne-Marie Duprey. After his father died when he was still young, Achintre's uncle Joseph Achintre, a university professor of humanities, raised him in Aix-en-Provence. Achintre had a brief military career before moving on to literature. He studied in Paris and took courses at the Conservatoire de Paris "to lose his southern accent."

== Career ==
As a young man, Achintre traveled to the West Indies. Intending to only stay there for a few weeks, he eventually spent five years on the island of Haiti. While living there, he started several newspapers, published books, and became involved in politics. This led to his arrest; he was imprisoned and sentenced to death. In 1859, however, after Fabre Geffrard restored a republic in Haiti, Achintre was pardoned for his crimes and appointed the Haitian ambassador to the United States. While traveling to New York City in his role as ambassador, the Haitian government was overthrown and his role was no longer official.

Achintre remained in the United States, and joined a theatrical company, which was touring America at the time, and eventually brought him to Montreal in 1861. There, Achintre decided to begin a career in journalism, eventually settling in Canada permanently in 1866. He wrote a lyric oratorio, La Confederation, about the political situation of the day; it was performed many times.

As a journalist, Achintre contributed to several publications including L'Événement in Quebec City, and La Minerve and Le Pays of Montreal. Achintre also wrote for L'Opinion publique. At the end of his career he was an editor at La Presse.

He died in Montreal, Quebec, Canada, on 25 June 1886.
