= Kit Lang =

Canadian actor

Kit Lang is a Canadian actor.

== Biography ==
=== Personal life ===
Kit Lang was born as Christopher William Lang in Montreal, Quebec, He was raised in the nearby small towns of Hudson, Quebec and Port Hope, Ontario, often traveling in between provinces to spend time with his separated parents.

=== Career ===
In 2001, Lang began his professional career studying drama at Vanier College in Montreal, Quebec, where he presented at various stage plays during the festival seasons. After two years of training, Lang relocated to Toronto, Ontario and devoted his time to honing his acting skills at various prestigious institutions under the guidance of reputable acting teachers such as Tom Todoroff/Palmerston Theatre; Kevin McCormick and R. H. Thomson/Equity Showcase Theatre and Walter Alza/Alza Studio. Having developing his craft, using voice and the Alexander technique both in Shakespearean and modern roles, Lang has showcased in lead performances on stage and in recorded media national and internationally.

In theatre, Lang had his stage debut in the 'oldest and proudest Toronto theatrical company’; Donald Jones. Toronto Star. In an Alumnae Theatre production of Girls Do Brunch at the ‘New Ideas Festival’. Later at Alumnae Theatre, Lang was cast in a stage version of Moonlight and Valentino as Valentino, a character based on Rudolph Valentino the 1920s silent film star.

In 2006 Lang worked in a CBC Radio drama, From the Beyond, alongside Eric Peterson and Saul Rubinek. It was around this time Lang joined the union guilds for performing artists ACTRA and later the Canadian Actors' Equity Association. Other notable stage performances in Lang’s portfolio included award-winning plays Angels in America, Tarantella, A Lonely Impulse of Delight and the British production of Crazy Gary's Mobile Disco. The latter was featured at the 2009 London, Windsor and Hamilton Fringe Festivals.

In film, Lang played the role of Dutch in the award-winning film entitled Gangsters Exchange. The film featured at multiple prominent film festivals internationally Beverly Hills Film Festival, The European Independent Film Festival, Seattle True Independent Film Festival, and the New York Film Festival.Gangsters Exchange won multiple awards including: Best Film Award at the Mississauga Independent Film Festival, Best Foreign Film at the 2009 Action On Film International Film Festival, and a New York Film Festival Award.

Further credits in films include: The Night Writer (premiering at the New York Film Festival and the International South Asian Film Festival), Trigger, The Blue Knight and Little Red Riding Hood. Trigger premiered at the prestigious Cannes International Film Festival and was in the official selection for Big Bear Lake International Film Festival, Trimedia Film Festival and the Moving Images Film Festival. Since premiering, Trigger is set to release in European cable. Both The Blue Knight and Little Red Riding Hood successfully premiered at the historic Tribeca Cinemas in New York City in March 2010, an event sponsored by the St. Jude Children’s Hospital.

In television, Lang has held key performing roles on Canada’s CBC Television’s Gemini Award winning show The Morgan Waters Show, Comedy Central’s Worst Speeches of All Time and in Citytv's Gemini Award-winning drama series Murdoch Mysteries, among others.

In the summer of 2010, Lang starred in two feature films shot in New York City, a drama entitled Memoir for Almanac Studios directed by Samuel Gonzalez and a horror film entitled Siodmak for Deviant Children Productions directed by Nicholas Ortiz, Lang playing leading roles in both.
