= Louis-Marie Régis =

Canadian philosopher, medievalist and Dominican priest

The Reverend Louis-Marie Régis CC OP MSRC
- Born: December 8, 1903; Hébertville, Quebec, Canada
- Died: February 2, 1988 (aged 84); Montreal, Quebec, Canada

Ecclesiastical career
- Church: Latin Church

Academic background
- Education: Saulchoir

Academic work
- Discipline: Philosophy
- Sub-discipline: Epistemology; metaphysics

Louis-Marie Régis CC OP MSRC (December 8, 1903 – February 2, 1988) was a Canadian philosopher, medievalist, and Dominican priest. He was the founder of the Institute for Medieval Studies in 1942 and served as its director from 1943 until 1952. In 1971 he was made a Companion of the Order of Canada.
