= Qapik Attagutsiak =

Canadian Inuk bone collector during WWII (1920–2023)

- Born: 11 June 1920; Siuraq, Northwest Territories (present day Nunavut), Canada
- Died: 14 December 2023 (aged 103); Ottawa, Ontario, Canada
- Known for: Animal bone and carcass collection efforts during World War II
- Children: 14

Qapik Attagutsiak (11 June 1920 – 14 December 2023) was a Canadian Inuk World War II contributor and the last known surviving Inuit contributor of the War, particularly the drive to collect animal bones and carcasses for the Allied munitions effort.

== Early life ==
Attagutsiak was born on 11 June 1920 at Siuraq, near Chesterfield Inlet (Igluligaarjuk) and Coral Harbour, in the Keewatin Region of the Northwest Territories, now the Kivalliq Region of Nunavut, Canada. Her father, Quliktalik, was a hunter, and her mother, Pakak, was a seamstress. She began to learn midwifery from her mother when she was 10 years old, becoming a midwife when she was 18, and subsequently working as a seamstress. She married a man named Attagutsiak, who became one of the first members of the Canadian Rangers in 1947. Qapik had 14 children with her husband Attagutsiak, the first of whom was born in 1939, and she adopted two more after her husband's death in 1984.

== Wartime efforts ==
Attagutsiak was 20 years old when news of World War II reached her community in 1940, and she was the last known surviving member of the Inuit wartime efforts during World War II. During World War II, the Government of Canada and the Department of Munitions and Supply instituted the National Resources Mobilization Act, encouraging citizens to salvage as much waste as possible, with the goal of repurposing used materials like metal, rubber, and paper into wartime munitions. Because these materials were not abundant in the Canadian Arctic, instead Inuit communities began to collect animal bones and carcasses to be shipped down to industrial cities and ports for use in the ongoing munitions drive. One centre of the bone and carcass collection efforts was a springtime hunting camp on an island called Qaipsunik, near Igloolik in today's Nunavut. The members of the camp collected about three bags of animal bones and carcasses per day from 1940 through 1945, with each bag weighing about 57 kg (125 lb). The bags were packaged by older members of the community, and then existing Hudson's Bay Company shipping routes were used to transport the bags to southern Canadian ports in cities like Montreal and Halifax where the materials were processed into ammunition, glue for aircraft, or fertilizer for the Canadian war effort.

== Recognition ==
In 2012, Attagutsiak received the Queen Elizabeth II Diamond Jubilee Medal, which is awarded "to honour significant contributions and achievements by Canadians". In January 2020, a ceremony in Gatineau was organised by Parks Canada and the Canadian Armed Forces at the Canadian Museum of History to honour Attagutsiak's contributions as the only known surviving representative of the wartime efforts by Inuit communities during World War II. Jonathan Wilkinson, the Minister of Environment and Climate Change and Minister responsible for Parks Canada, named her one of Parks Canada's Hometown Heroes.

Attagutsiak was also acknowledged for her work as a health professional. Parks Canada credited Attagutsiak with being "instrumental in helping establish the Akausivik Inuit Family Health Team - Medical Centre in Ottawa" in her capacity as a midwife. She also contributed to academic studies of health promotion, and the use of technology to improve health outcomes, among Inuit living in cities.

Attagutsiak was for several years the oldest Elder in Arctic Bay, and was called a "revered elder" in Nunatsiaq News. In 2014, a photo by Clare Kines that documented Attagutsiak's traditional lifestyle was a finalist in the Global Arctic Awards International Photography Competition, and was exhibited internationally.

== Death ==
Attagutsiak died in Ottawa on 14 December 2023, at the age of 103.
