= Rachel Schill =

Canadian softball player

Rachel Schill (born June 9, 1982 in Kitchener, Ontario) is a Canadian softball center fielder. She started softball at age 10, and has attended Simon Fraser University. She was a part of the Canadian Softball team that finished 9th at the 2002 World Championships in Saskatoon, Saskatchewan, and part of the Canadian Softball team that finished 5th at the 2004 Summer Olympics.
