= Paul Tucker (artist) =

Artist

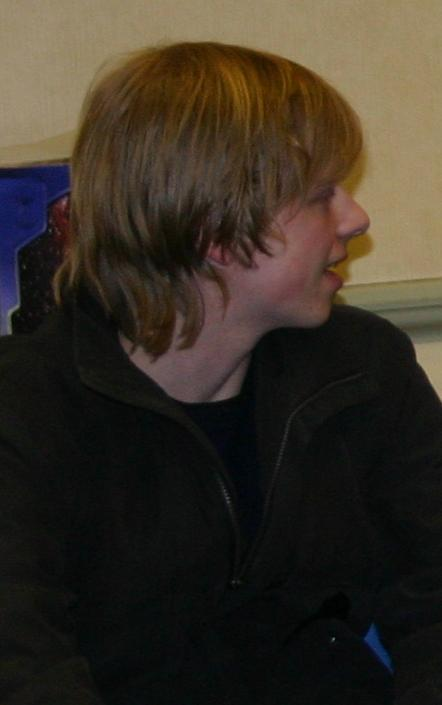
- Tucker at the 2008 Sci-Fi on the Rock convention
- Born: Paul Tucker; November 4, 1981 (age 45) St. John's, Newfoundland, Canada
- Area: artist
- Notable works: Dystopian Dream Girl; Proof of Concept; The Underworld Railroad

Paul Tucker (born November 4, 1981) is a Canadian visual artist, and illustrator of graphic novels and webcomics.

== Biography ==
Born in St. John's, Newfoundland, Tucker claims his fascination with comics started as a child, and stuck with him.

== Education ==
Tucker attained his bachelor's degree in Fine Arts, at Memorial University of Newfoundland Sir Wilfred Grenfell College in Corner Brook.

== Japanese travel ==
After university he taught English in Japan for a year. In Japan, Tucker was able to learn more about the popular illustrated comic books, known as manga.

== Partial bibliography ==
Comic Books

- Dystopian Dream Girl
- Proof of Concept (AiT/PlanetLar)
- The Underworld Railroad (2007, Viper Comics)
- Tet (2015, IDW Publishing)
- Nobody is in Control (2019)

Webcomics

- Google John Smith - a collaboration with writer Aaron Goulding, about a man named John Smith who strives to claim the top Google search result for his own name.
