= Joseph-Élisée Beaudet =

Canadian politician

Joseph-Élisée Beaudet (October 25, 1832 – February 15, 1910) was a businessman and political figure in Quebec. He represented Chicoutimi-Saguenay in the Legislative Assembly of Quebec from 1880 to 1881 as a Conservative. His name also appears as Élisée Beaudet.

He was born on October 25, 1832, in Lotbinière, Lower Canada, the son of Amable Beaudet and Félicité Chabot. He was partner with Eugène Chinic in the firm Chinic et Beaudet, later the Chinic Hardware Company of Québec. Beaudet was also co-owner of a sawmill at Betsiamites and director and vice-president for the Quebec and Lake St. John Railway. He later served as a customs official at Quebec City. He was married twice: to Éléonore-Georgianne Hardy in 1859 and to Emma Bourgeois in 1906.

He was first elected to the Quebec assembly in an 1880 by-election held after William Evan Price resigned his seat for health reasons. He did not run for re-election in the 1881 general election. He was an unsuccessful candidate in an 1886 by-election in Lotbinière. Beaudet died in Quebec City and was buried at Sainte-Foy.
