= Alexander Henderson (Canadian politician) =

Canadian politician

Alexander Henderson KC
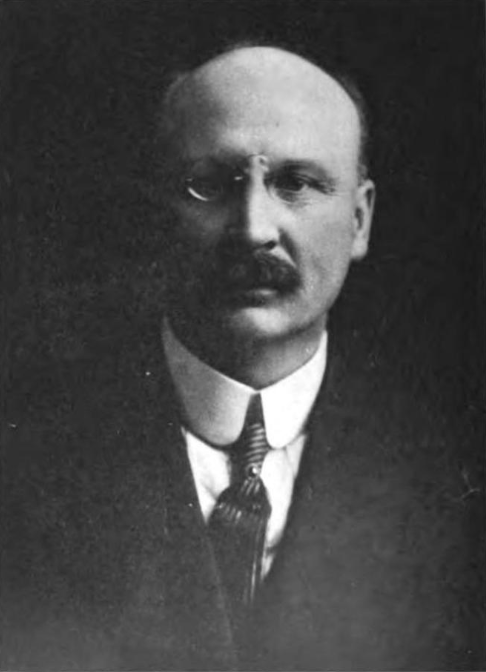

Commissioner of Yukon
- In office 1907–1911
- Preceded by: John T. Lithgow
- Succeeded by: Arthur Wilson (acting)

Member of the Legislative Assembly of British Columbia
- In office 1898–1900
- Constituency: New Westminster City

Personal details
- Born: March 13, 1860 Oshawa, Canada West
- Died: December 13, 1940 (aged 80) Vancouver, British Columbia
- Spouse: Susan Crawford (m. 1895)
- Occupation: Jurist, politician

Alexander Henderson (March 13, 1860 – December 13, 1940) was a lawyer, judge and political figure in British Columbia and Yukon. He represented New Westminster City in the Legislative Assembly of British Columbia from 1898 to 1900. Henderson served as the sixth commissioner of Yukon from 1907 to 1911.

== Biography ==
Henderson was born in Oshawa, Canada West, the son of Alexander Henderson, and was educated there, at the University of Toronto and at Osgoode Hall. Henderson was called to the Ontario bar in 1889 and the British Columbia bar in 1892. Henderson practised law in Oshawa until 1891 when he moved to New Westminster, British Columbia. In 1899, he was named King's Counsel. He served in the British Columbia cabinet as Attorney General. In 1904, he was named county court judge for Vancouver, serving until 1907, when he resigned his seat to run unsuccessfully for a seat in the British Columbia assembly. Henderson also served as major in the militia.

In 1895, Henderson married Susan Crawford, the daughter of William McCraney.

Henderson died in Vancouver on December 13, 1940.
