= John T. Lithgow =

Canadian politician

John Thomas Lithgow (born in Nova Scotia about 1856, died after 1915) was the acting commissioner of Yukon from January to May 1907. Earlier he had served as Controller of the Currency for Yukon, in 1898 to at least 1904. He was a member of the Conservative party.

In 1910, he was appointed as Canadian Trade Commissioner in Glasgow, Scotland.
