= François Xavier Gosselin =

François Xavier Gosselin (1861 – May 28, 1916) was a notary and political figure in the Yukon. He served as Gold Commissioner for the Yukon from 1907 to 1912.

He was born in Quebec, where he worked as a notary for 14 years. In October 1898, he came to Dawson City. In January of the following year, Gosselin was named Crown Timber and Land Agent for the Yukon. He died from heart failure at the Yukonia Hotel in Dawson City in 1916.
