= List of Canadian films of 1980 =

This is a list of Canadian films which were released in 1980:

Title	Director	Cast	Genre	Notes
Agency	George Kaczender	Robert Mitchum, Lee Majors, Valerie Perrine, Alexandra Stewart, Saul Rubinek	Drama/thriller	
Atlantic City	Louis Malle	Burt Lancaster, Susan Sarandon, Michel Piccoli, Hollis McLaren, Robert Joy, Al Waxman, Kate Reid, Moses Znaimer, Robert Goulet	A Canadian-French-U.S. crime drama/ romance set in Atlantic City, NJ,	The first Canadian film to receive a Best Picture Oscar nomination.
Bad Company	Peter Vronsky	Clay Borris	Drama	Straight to video
Challenger: An Industrial Romance	Stephen Low		Documentary	
The Changeling	Peter Medak	George C. Scott, Trish Van Devere, Melvyn Douglas, Jean Marsh, John Colicos, Barry Morse	Thriller	Golden Reel Award
The Coffin Affair (L'Affaire Coffin)	Jean-Claude Labrecque	August Schellenberg, Gabriel Arcand	Docudrama	Based on the case of Wilbert Coffin
Coming Out Alive	Don McBrearty	Helen Shaver, Scott Hylands, Michael Ironside	Thriller	
Cordélia	Jean Beaudin	Louise Portal, Gilbert Sicotte, James Blendick	Historical drama	Genie Award – Costumes; based on a novel by Pauline Cadieux
The Courage of Kavik the Wolf Dog	Peter Carter		Adventure	
Deadly Companion	George Bloomfield	Michael Sarrazin, Anthony Perkins, John Candy	Mystery, thriller	
Death Ship	Alvin Rakoff	George Kennedy, Richard Crenna, Nick Mancuso, Sally Ann Howes, Kate Reid	Horror	
The Dream Never Dies	William Johnston	Ken Read	Documentary	
Fantastica	Gilles Carle	Carole Laure, Lewis Furey, Serge Reggiani, Claudine Auger, John Vernon	Musical fantasy	Genie Award – Costumes; entered into the 1980 Cannes Film Festival
Final Assignment	Paul Almond	Geneviève Bujold, Michael York, Burgess Meredith, Colleen Dewhurst	Drama	
Funeral Home	William Fruet	Lesleh Donaldson, Kay Hawtrey, Harvey Atkin	Horror	
Girls	Just Jaeckin	Anne Parillaud	Drama	French-German-Canadian coproduction
Good Riddance (Les Bons débarras)	Francis Mankiewicz	Charlotte Laurier, Marie Tifo, Germain Houde, Louise Marleau, Roger Lebel, Gilbert Sicotte	Drama	AV Preservation Trust Masterwork
The Handyman (L'Homme à tout faire)	Micheline Lanctôt	Jocelyn Bérubé, Andrée Pelletier, Marcel Sabourin	Drama	
Hank Williams: The Show He Never Gave	David Acomba	Sneezy Waters, Dixie Seatle, Sean McCann	Musical, biographical drama	
Head On	Michael Grant	Sally Kellerman, Lawrence Dane, Stephen Lack	Drama	
History of the World in Three Minutes Flat	Michael Mills	Vlasta Vrána	Animated short	
Hog Wild	Les Rose		Comedy	
Hot Dogs (Les chiens chauds)	Claude Fournier			
The Hounds of Notre Dame	Zale Dalen	Thomas Peacocke, Frances Hyland, Barry Morse, David Ferry	Drama	Genie Award – Actor (Peacocke)
It Can't Be Winter, We Haven't Had Summer Yet (Ça peut pas être l'hiver, on n'a même pas eu d'été)	Louise Carré	Charlotte Boisjoli, Céline Lomez, Jacques Galipeau	Drama	
It Rained All Night the Day I Left	Nicolas Gessner	Tony Curtis, Louis Gossett Jr., Sally Kellerman	Comedy	
Jack London's Klondike Fever	Peter Carter	Jeff East, Gordon Pinsent, Lorne Greene, Barry Morse, Rod Steiger, Angie Dickerson	Adventure	Genie Award – Supporting Actor (Pinsent)
The Kidnapping of the President	George Mendeluk	William Shatner, Hal Holbrook, Van Johnson, Ava Gardner, Maury Chaykin	Political thriller	Based on a novel by Charles Templeton; made with U.S. financing
The Last Chase	Martyn Burke	Lee Majors, Chris Makepeace, Burgess Meredith, Alexandra Stewart	Sci-fi drama	Made with U.S. financing
The Lucky Star	Max Fischer	Lou Jacobi, Rod Steiger, Louise Fletcher, Brett Marx, Helen Hughes	Holocaust melodrama	Genie Awards – Adapted Screenplay, Musical Score, Sound Editing
Middle Age Crazy	John Trent	Bruce Dern, Ann-Margret, Eric Christmas	Drama	Made with U.S. financing
No Looking Back	Dennis Hopper	Dennis Hopper, Linda Manz	Drama	
Nothing Personal	George Bloomfield	Donald Sutherland, Suzanne Somers, Lawrence Dane, Roscoeé Lee Browne, Dabney Coleman	Comedy	Made with U.S. financing
Phobia	John Huston	Paul Michael Glaser, Susan Hogan, John Colicos, Patricia Collins	Drama	The American director John Huston’s only Canadian film. His father, Walter Huston, was born in Toronto.
Pinball Summer	George Mihalka	Michael Zelniker, Carl Marotte	Teen comedy	
Prom Night	Paul Lynch	Leslie Nielsen, Jamie Lee Curtis	Slasher film	Jamie Lee Curtis cemented her early reputation as the ‘scream queen’ with this slasher tale of revenge.
Some Even Fall in Love (Plusieurs tombent en amour)	Guy Simoneau		Documentary	
Sophie Wollock's Newspaper	Gilles Blais		Documentary	
Speak White	Pierre Falardeau, Julien Poulin	Marie Eykel	Short	Recitation of Michèle Lalonde's influential poem of the same name
The Strongest Man in the World	Halya Kuchmij	Mike Swistun	Short documentary	
Suzanne	Robin Spry	Jennifer Dale, Winston Rekert, Gabriel Arcand	Romance, drama	
The Sweater	Sheldon Cohen		National Film Board animated short	Adaptation of Roch Carrier children's story; BAFTA – Animated Short
Tanya's Island	Alfred Sole		Fantasy	
Terror Train	Roger Spottiswoode	Ben Johnson, Jamie Lee Curtis	Slasher film	Made with U.S. financing
Tribute	Bob Clark	Jack Lemmon, Robby Benson, Lee Remick	Drama based on the play by Bernard Slade	Academy Award nomination – Actor (Lemmon)
A Wives' Tale (Une histoire de femmes)	Sophie Bissonnette, Martin Duckworth, Joyce Rock		Documentary	

== See also ==
- 1980 in Canada
- 1980 in Canadian television
