= 2nd Genie Awards =

1981 Canadian film awards

- Date: March 12, 1981
- Site: Royal Alexandra Theatre, Toronto
- Hosted by: Brian Linehan

Highlights
- Best Picture: Les bons débarras (Good Riddance)
- Most awards: Les bons débarras (Good Riddance) (8)
- Most nominations: Les bons débarras (Good Riddance); Tribute

Television coverage
- Network: CBC Television

The 2nd Genie Awards were held March 12, 1981, honouring Canadian films released in 1980. The ceremony, which was broadcast live by the CBC, was held at the Royal Alexandra Theatre and was hosted by television host Brian Linehan.

The most notable sight of the evening was Prime Minister Pierre Trudeau escorting starlet Kim Cattrall; the moment received renewed media attention in March 2016 when 60 Minutes, in a profile of Justin Trudeau, ran a photo of the appearance while mis-identifying Cattrall as Margaret Trudeau.

The films Good Riddance (Les Bons débarras) and Tribute tied for the most nominations overall. Les bons débarras won most of the major awards, including Best Picture.

For the first time, screenings for academy members were held in western Canada, in Edmonton and Vancouver. Later in the year the Academy of Canadian Cinema held the Bijou Awards, a one-time ceremony to honour non-feature and non-theatrical films, and to present some of the specialized categories that had been dropped from the Genies in their transition from the Canadian Film Awards.

== Award winners and nominees ==
Motion Picture	Direction
Good Riddance (Les bons débarras) (Claude Godbout, Marcia Couelle); The Handyman (L'Homme à tout faire) (René Malo); The Hounds of Notre Dame (Fil Fraser); The Lucky Star (André Fleury, Claude Léger); Tribute (Joel B. Michaels, Garth Drabinsky)	Francis Mankiewicz, Good Riddance (Les bons débarras); Bob Clark, Tribute; Zale Dalen, The Hounds of Notre Dame; Jean-Claude Labrecque, The Coffin Affair (L'Affaire Coffin); Micheline Lanctôt, The Handyman (L'Homme à tout faire)
Actor in a leading role	Actress in a leading role
Thomas Peacocke, The Hounds of Notre Dame; Jocelyn Bérubé, The Handyman (L'Homme à tout faire); Lewis Furey, Fantastica; Winston Rekert, Suzanne; August Schellenberg, The Coffin Affair (L'Affaire Coffin)	Marie Tifo, Good Riddance (Les bons débarras); Geneviève Bujold, Final Assignment; Jennifer Dale, Suzanne; Charlotte Laurier, Good Riddance (Les bons débarras); Andrée Pelletier, The Handyman (L'Homme à tout faire)
Actor in a supporting role	Actress in a supporting role
Germain Houde, Good Riddance (Les bons débarras); Gabriel Arcand, Suzanne; David Ferry, The Hounds of Notre Dame; Robert Joy, Atlantic City, U.S.A.; John Marley, Tribute	Kate Reid, Atlantic City, U.S.A.; Colleen Dewhurst, Tribute; Gale Garnett, Tribute; Frances Hyland, The Hounds of Notre Dame; Micheline Lanctôt, The Coffin Affair (L'Affaire Coffin)
Foreign Actor	Foreign Actress
Jack Lemmon, Tribute; Bruce Dern, Middle Age Crazy; Burt Lancaster, Atlantic City, U.S.A.; Brett Marx, The Lucky Star; Rod Steiger, The Lucky Star	Susan Sarandon, Atlantic City, U.S.A.; Ann-Margret, Middle Age Crazy; Jamie Lee Curtis, Prom Night; Louise Fletcher, The Lucky Star; Lee Remick, Tribute
Original Screenplay	Adapted Screenplay
Réjean Ducharme, Good Riddance (Les bons débarras); Marc Rosen, Final Assignment; Jean-Claude Labrecque, Jacques Benoit, The Coffin Affair (L'Affaire Coffin); Micheline Lanctôt, The Handyman (L'Homme à tout faire); Ken Mitchell, The Hounds of Notre Dame	Max Fischer and Jack Rosenthal, The Lucky Star; Bernard Slade, Tribute; Ronald Sutherland and Robin Spry, Suzanne
Best Documentary	Best Theatrical Short
Guy Simoneau, Some Even Fall in Love (Plusiers tombent en amour); William Johnston, The Dream Never Dies; Arthur Lamothe, A Wives' Tale (Une histoire de femmes)	Halya Kuchmij, The Strongest Man in the World; Roberta King and Ronald Squire, Heavy Horse Pull; Michael Mills, History of the World in Three Minutes Flat
Art Direction	Cinematography
Anne Pritchard, Atlantic City, U.S.A.; Glenn Bydwell, Terror Train; Anne Pritchard and Jocelyn Joly, Fantastica; Michel Proulx, Good Riddance (Les bons débarras); Normand Sarazin, The Handyman (L'Homme à tout faire)	Michel Brault, Good Riddance (Les bons débarras); Richard Ciupka, Atlantic City, U.S.A.; Miklós Lente, Suzanne; Reginald H. Morris, Phobia; François Protat, Fantastica
Costume Design	Editing
Anne Pritchard, Fantastica; François Barbeau, Atlantic City, U.S.A.; Louise Jobin, Suzanne; Linda Matheson, Middle Age Crazy; Diane Paquet, Good Riddance (Les bons débarras)	André Corriveau, Good Riddance (Les bons débarras); Pierre Jalbert, Final Assignment; Brian Ravok, Prom Night; Tony Lower, The Hounds of Notre Dame; Michael McLaverty, The Kidnapping of the President
Sound	Sound Editing
Henri Blondeau and Michel Descombes, Good Riddance (Les bons débarras); Austin Grimaldi, Dino Pigat, David Appleby, Bo Harwood, Terror Train; Larry Sutton, Paul Coombe, Mike Hoogenboom, The Hounds of Notre Dame; Mike Hoogenboom, Nolan Roberts, Doug Ganton, The Kidnapping of the President; Patrick Rousseau, Michel Descombes, The Lucky Star; Joe Grimaldi, Austin Grimaldi, Dino Pigat, David Lee, Tribute	Jean-Guy Montpetit, The Lucky Star; Kenneth Heeley-Ray, Wayne Griffin and Patrick Drummond, Tribute; Jim Hopkins, The Hounds of Notre Dame; Bruce Nyznik, Final Assignment
Best Musical Score	Special Awards
Art Philips, The Lucky Star; Matthew McCauley, Middle Age Crazy; John Mills-Cockell, Terror Train; Kenneth Wannberg, Tribute	Golden Reel: The Changeling; Special Achievement Genie: Micheline Lanctôt; Outstanding Contributions to the Canadian Film Industry: Violet Crone, Robert Crone
