= 1980 in Canada =

- Decades: 1960s; 1970s; 1980s; 1990s; 2000s
- See also: History of Canada; Timeline of Canadian history; List of years in Canada

Events from the year 1980 in Canada.

== Incumbents ==
=== Crown ===
- Monarch – Elizabeth II

=== Federal government ===
- Governor General – Edward Schreyer
- Prime Minister – Joe Clark (until March 3) then Pierre Trudeau
- Chief Justice – Bora Laskin (Ontario)
- Parliament – 32nd (from April 14)

=== Provincial governments ===
==== Lieutenant governors ====
- Lieutenant Governor of Alberta – Francis Charles Lynch-Staunton
- Lieutenant Governor of British Columbia – Henry Pybus Bell-Irving
- Lieutenant Governor of Manitoba – Francis Lawrence Jobin
- Lieutenant Governor of New Brunswick – Hédard Robichaud
- Lieutenant Governor of Newfoundland – Gordon Arnaud Winter
- Lieutenant Governor of Nova Scotia – John Elvin Shaffner
- Lieutenant Governor of Ontario – Pauline Mills McGibbon (until September 15) then John Black Aird
- Lieutenant Governor of Prince Edward Island – Gordon Lockhart Bennett (until January 14) then Joseph Aubin Doiron
- Lieutenant Governor of Quebec – Jean-Pierre Côté
- Lieutenant Governor of Saskatchewan – Irwin McIntosh

==== Premiers ====
- Premier of Alberta – Peter Lougheed
- Premier of British Columbia – Bill Bennett
- Premier of Manitoba – Sterling Lyon
- Premier of New Brunswick – Richard Hatfield
- Premier of Newfoundland – Brian Peckford
- Premier of Nova Scotia – John Buchanan
- Premier of Ontario – Bill Davis
- Premier of Prince Edward Island – Angus MacLean
- Premier of Quebec – René Lévesque
- Premier of Saskatchewan – Allan Blakeney

=== Territorial governments ===
==== Commissioners ====
- Commissioner of Yukon – Douglas Bell
- Commissioner of Northwest Territories – John Havelock Parker

==== Premiers ====
- Premier of the Northwest Territories – George Braden (from June 16)
- Premier of Yukon – Chris Pearson

== Events ==
=== January to June ===
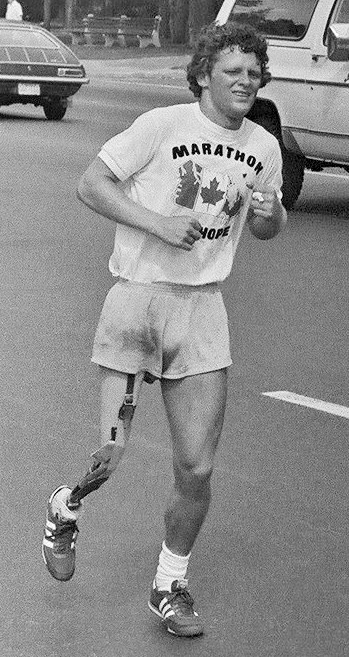
Terry Fox on his Marathon of Hope run

- January 21 – Three Soviet embassy workers are expelled after they are accused of spying
- January 28 – Canadian ambassador to Iran, Ken Taylor, organizes the escape of American citizens from Iran
- February 5 – Fort Chimo, Quebec, is renamed to Kuujjuaq.
- February 18 – Federal election: Pierre Trudeau's Liberals win a majority, defeating Joe Clark's PCs
- February 29 – Jeanne Sauvé becomes first woman Speaker of the House of Commons
- March 3 – Pierre Trudeau becomes prime minister for the second time, replacing Joe Clark
- April 12 – Terry Fox begins his Marathon of Hope run across Canada in support of cancer research
- May 20 – Quebec votes against separation in the 1980 Quebec referendum
- June 16 – George Braden becomes government leader of the Northwest Territories, as responsible government is reinstituted for the first time since 1905.

=== July to December ===
- July 1 – "O Canada" becomes the official national anthem
- July 30 – Elizabeth II augments the coat of arms of Alberta with a crest and supporters
- August 14 – Dorothy Stratten, an actress, is raped and killed in Los Angeles by Paul Snider before he commits suicide.
- August 16 to August 23 – First Session of the Youth Parliament of Canada/Parlement jeunesse du Canada held in the Senate chambers of the Canadian Parliament Buildings in Ottawa.
- August 27 – The Winnipeg Tribune and the Ottawa Journal, two Canadian broadsheet newspapers, owned by Southam and Thomson newspapers are closed.
- September 1 – Due to a return of his cancer Terry Fox curtails his run
- September 1 – Saskatchewan and Alberta celebrate the 75th anniversaries of their establishment as provinces, culminating a summer full of festivals and special events
- October 6 – The Quebec and Newfoundland governments sign the Churchill Falls hydro agreement.
- October 6 – Trudeau announces his plan to patriate the Canadian constitution unilaterally
- October 28 – The National Energy Program is introduced
- November 17 – Clifford Olson rapes and kills his first victim

== Arts and literature ==
=== New Works ===
- Mordecai Richler – Joshua Then and Now
- Robert Munsch – The Paper Bag Princess

=== Awards ===
- See 1980 Governor General's Awards for a complete list of winners and finalists for those awards.
- Books in Canada First Novel Award: Clark Blaise, Lunar Attractions
- Stephen Leacock Award: Donald Jack, Me Bandy, You Cissie
- Vicky Metcalf Award: John Craig

=== Television ===
- The Royal Canadian Air Farce makes it first television special
- December 17 – The Christmas Raccoons premiers on CBC.

=== Film ===
- April 14 – The National Film Board wins an Oscar for its animated films.

== Sport ==
- March 16 – The Alberta Golden Bears win their University Cup by defeating the Regina Cougars 7 to 3. The final game was played at the Regina Agridome
- April 22 – Canada announces it will join the boycott of the 1980 Summer Olympics due to the Soviet Invasion of Afghanistan.
- April 30 – Hockey player Gordie Howe retires
- May 11 – The Cornwall Royals win their second Memorial Cup by defeating the Peterborough Petes 3 to 2. The final game was played at the Keystone Centre in Brandon, Manitoba
- May 21 – The Atlanta Flames relocate to Calgary, to become the 8th Canadian team in the NHL as the Calgary Flames
- May 24 – Val Marie, Saskatchewan's Bryan Trottier of the New York Islanders is awarded the Conn Smythe trophy
- October 10 – Wayne Gretzky plays in his first NHL game when his Edmonton Oilers are defeated by the Chicago Black Hawks
- November 8 – Quebec City's Rick Martel wins his first World Wrestling Federation Tag Team Championship (with Tony Garea) by defeating the Wild Samoans in Allentown, Pennsylvania
- November 23 – The Edmonton Eskimos win their seventh (and third consecutive) Grey Cup by defeating the Hamilton Tiger-Cats 48 to 10 in the 68th Grey Cup played at Exhibition Stadium in Toronto
- November 29 – The Alberta Golden Bears win their third (and last to date) Vanier Cup by defeating the Ottawa Gee-Gees 40–21 in the 16th Vanier Cup played at Varsity Stadium in Toronto

=== Full date unknown ===
- Walter Wolf Racing, first Canadian Formula One constructor, closes, its assets sold to Emerson Fittipaldi.

== Births ==
- January 1 – Mark Nichols, curler
- January 19 – Luke Macfarlane, actor and musician
- January 20 – Philippe Gagnon, Paralympic swimmer
- January 21 – Kevin McKenna, footballer
- January 22 – Amy Cotton, judoka
- February 6 – Kim Poirier, actress
- February 9
  - Liam Cormier, musician
  - Michelle Currie, skater
- February 10 – Mike Ribeiro, ice hockey player
- February 14 – Michelle Rempel, Conservative MP
- February 16 – Blair Betts, ice hockey player
- February 17 – Zachary Bennett, actor and musician
- February 21
  - Brad Fast, ice hockey player
  - Yannick Lupien, swimmer
- February 23 – Yvonne Tousek, artistic gymnast
- February 29 – Simon Gagné, ice hockey player
- March 1 – Manmeet Bhullar, lawyer and politician (d. 2015)
- March 2 – Julia Chantrey, actress
- March 10 – Stephen Peat, ice hockey player (d. 2024)
- March 13 – Malindi Elmore, middle-distance athlete
- March 14 – Jessica Mulroney, fashion stylist
- March 21 – Deryck Whibley, guitarist, lead vocalist, songwriter and producer
- March 24 – Ramzi Abid, ice hockey player
- March 31 – Michael Ryder, ice hockey player
- April 6 – Bardish Chagger, politician
- April 10 – Sean Avery, ice hockey player
- April 17 – Alaina Huffman, film and television actress
- April 19
  - Mayko Nguyen, actress
  - Robyn Regehr, ice hockey player
- April 21 – Vincent Lecavalier, ice hockey player
- April 29 – Mathieu Biron, ice hockey player
- May 1 – Robin Randall, water polo player
- May 4 – Andrew Raycroft, ice hockey player
- May 5 – Noah Miller, water polo player
- May 8 – Benny Yau, entertainer
- May 22 – Angela Whyte, hurdler
- May 26 – Richard Green, soldier killed in Afghanistan (d. 2002)
- May 29 – Valérie Hould-Marchand, synchronized swimmer
- June 5 – Mike Fisher, ice hockey player
- June 24 – Liane Balaban, actress
- July 2 – Thomas Marks, water polo player
- July 11 – Tyson Kidd, wrestler
- July 15 – Jonathan Cheechoo, ice hockey player
- July 16 – Matt Peck, field hockey player
- July 21 – Scott Frandsen, rower and Olympic silver medallist
- July 27 – Paul Larmand, basketball player
- August 3 – Dominic Moore, ice hockey player
- August 5 – Mark Bell, ice hockey player
- August 9 – Charlie David, actor
- August 21 – Jon Lajoie, comedian
- August 24 – Tanya Hunks, swimmer
- August 28 – Carly Pope, actress
- August 29 – Perdita Felicien, hurdler
- September 2 – Dany Sabourin, French Canadian ice hockey goaltender and coach
- September 5 – Kevin Simm, singer (Liberty X)
- September 9 – Félix Brillant, soccer player
- September 17 – Brent McMahon, triathlete
- September 19 – Adrian Cann, soccer player
- September 24 – Peter Dembicki, rower
- September 26 – Kerry DuWors, violinist, chamber musician and educator
- September 29 – Dallas Green, singer-songwriter
- October 3 – Daniel DeSanto, film, television and voice actor
- October 13 – Marc-André Bergeron, ice hockey player
- October 14 – Mike Munday, volleyball player
- October 21 – Mike Danton, ice hockey player
- November 4 – Erin Cumpstone, softball player
- November 9
  - Dominique Maltais, snowboarder and Olympic bronze medallist
  - Ben Rutledge, rower, Olympic gold medallist and World Champion
- November 12 – Ryan Gosling, actor, musician, and producer
- November 16 – Carol Huynh, freestyle wrestler and Olympic gold medallist
- November 18
  - Dustin Kensrue, singer
  - Emanuel Sandhu, figure skater
- November 23 – Tracy Latimer, murder victim (d. 1993)
- December 1 – Joel A. Sutherland, author
- December 2 – Adam Kreek, rower, Olympic gold medallist and World Champion
- December 9 – Ryder Hesjedal, cyclist

=== Full date unknown ===
- Kent Abbott, rock musician (Grade) (d. 2013)

== Deaths ==
=== January to July ===
- January 1 – Ernest Cormier, engineer and architect (b. 1885)
- March 5 – Jay Silverheels, actor (b. 1912)
- May 17 – Harold Connolly, journalist, newspaper editor, politician and Premier of Nova Scotia (b. 1901)
- July 23 – Sarto Fournier, politician and mayor of Montreal (b. 1903)

=== August to December ===
- August 14
  - Dorothy Stratten, model, actress and murder victim (b. 1960)
  - Paul Snider, murder (b. 1951)
- September 25 – Antonio Talbot, politician (b. 1900)

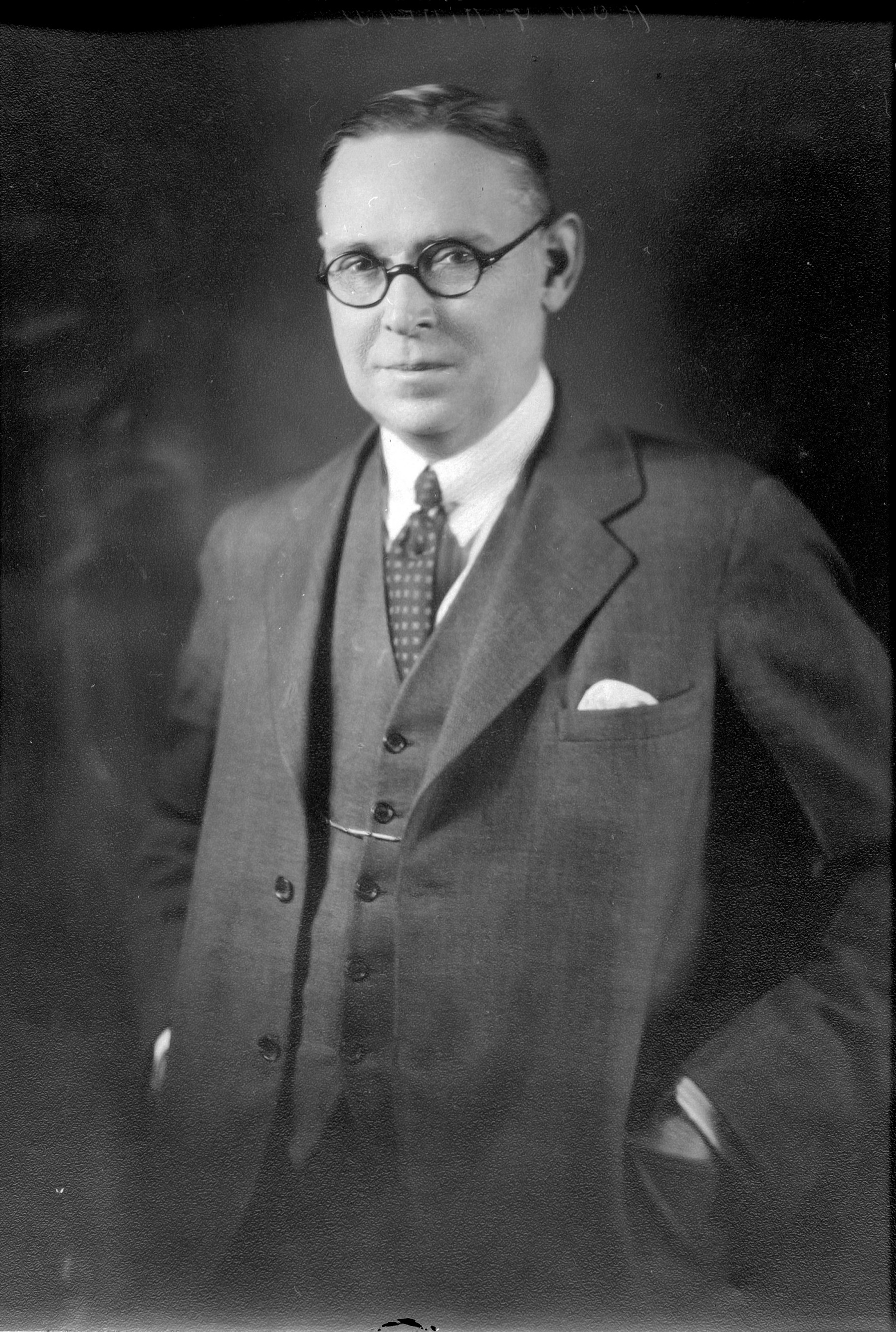
Richard Gavin Reid

- October 17 – Richard Gavin Reid, politician and 7th Premier of Alberta (b. 1879)
- October 27 – Judy LaMarsh, politician and Minister, lawyer, author and broadcaster (b. 1924)
- November 4 – Elsie MacGill, the world's first female aircraft designer (b. 1905)
- November 18 – Conn Smythe, ice hockey manager and owner (b. 1895)
- November 21 – A. J. M. Smith, poet (b. 1902)
- November 22 – Jules Léger, diplomat and Governor General of Canada (b. 1913)
- December 7 – W. L. Morton, historian (b. 1908)
- December 9 – Dorise Nielsen, politician (b. 1902)
- December 12 – Jean Lesage, lawyer, politician and Premier of Quebec (b. 1912)
- December 22 – Ethel Wilson, novelist and short story writer (b. 1888)
- December 31 – Marshall McLuhan, educator, philosopher, and scholar (b. 1911)

=== Full date unknown ===
- Ray Lawson, 17th Lieutenant Governor of Ontario (b. 1886)

== See also ==
- 1980 in Canadian television
- List of Canadian films of 1980
