= The strongest man in the world =

The strongest man in the world may refer to:

== Events ==
- World's Strongest Man, a well-known competition event in strength athletics

== Film ==
- The Strongest Man in the World, a 1975 Disney film
- The Strongest Man in the World (1980 film), a 1980 Canadian short film

== Literature ==
- The Strongest Man in the World (German: Der stärkste Mann der Welt), the 198th volume in the Digedags comic strip series, originally published in the German comic magazine Mosaik
- The Strongest Man in the World, a 1979 non-fiction book about Vasily Alekseyev by Dmitry Ivanov
- The Strongest Man in the World: Louis Cyr, a 2007 non-fiction book by Nicolas Debon

== People ==
- Zishe Breitbart, a Polish-born circus performer, known as "Strongest Man in the World"

== Television ==
- "The Strongest Man in the World", I Dream of Jeannie season 4, episode 7 (1968)
- "The Strongest Man in the World", Rokka: Braves of the Six Flowers episode 1 (2015)

== Other uses ==
- Artie, the Strongest Man in the World, a character from The Adventures of Pete & Pete
