= Top 10 Canadian Films of All Time =

Ranking by the Toronto International Film Festival

The Top 10 Canadian Films of All Time is a list compiled by the Toronto International Film Festival ranking what are considered the best Canadian films. It was first published in 1984, typically assembled by polling a combination of Canadian critics and filmmakers. Separate from the festival's annual Canada's Top Ten list of the best Canadian films released within that year, it was redone in 1993, 2004 and 2015.

== Methodology ==
The list is compiled once every decade. The list was started in 1984 because Canadian film was taking off, and was made by polling critics, professors, fans and festival staff. According to Piers Handling, a TIFF director, the idea of the Top 10 was to introduce the public to Canadian film, and around 100 people were polled. TIFF did not provide the poll-takers with a list of films to choose from.

In 2015, the polling method was changed, as those who responded were divided into two groups, filmmakers and critics. Filmmakers made up 40% of the respondents. There were 200 participants.

== Lists ==
=== 2015 ===
The 2015 list reads:

Rank	Title	Year	Director
1	Atanarjuat: The Fast Runner	2001	Zacharias Kunuk
2	Mon oncle Antoine	1971	Claude Jutra
3	The Sweet Hereafter	1997	Atom Egoyan
4	Jesus of Montreal (Jésus de Montréal)	1989	Denys Arcand
5	Léolo	1992	Jean-Claude Lauzon
6	Goin' Down the Road	1970	Don Shebib
7	Dead Ringers	1988	David Cronenberg
8	C.R.A.Z.Y.	2005	Jean-Marc Vallée
9	My Winnipeg	2007	Guy Maddin
10 (tie)	Stories We Tell	2012	Sarah Polley
10 (tie)	Orders (Les Ordres)	1974	Michel Brault

=== 2004 ===
The 2004 list reads:

Rank	Title	Year	Director
1	Mon oncle Antoine	1971	Claude Jutra
2	Jesus of Montreal	1989	Denys Arcand
3 (tie)	Goin' Down the Road	1970	Don Shebib
3 (tie)	The Sweet Hereafter	1997	Atom Egoyan
5	Atanarjuat: The Fast Runner	2001	Zacharias Kunuk
6	Dead Ringers	1988	David Cronenberg
7	Good Riddance (Les Bons débarras)	1980	Francis Mankiewicz
8	Orders (Les Ordres)	1974	Michel Brault
9 (tie)	The Decline of the American Empire	1986	Denys Arcand
9 (tie)	The Barbarian Invasions	2003	Denys Arcand

=== 1993 ===
The 1993 list reads:

Rank	Title	Year	Director
1	Mon oncle Antoine	1971	Claude Jutra
2	Jesus of Montreal	1989	Denys Arcand
3	Goin' Down the Road	1970	Don Shebib
4	The Decline of the American Empire	1986	Denys Arcand
5	Good Riddance (Les Bons débarras)	1980	Francis Mankiewicz
6	Orders (Les Ordres)	1974	Michel Brault
7	The Apprenticeship of Duddy Kravitz	1974	Ted Kotcheff
8	The Grey Fox	1983	Phillip Borsos
9	I've Heard the Mermaids Singing	1987	Patricia Rozema
10	The Adjuster	1991	Atom Egoyan

=== 1984 ===
The 1984 list reads:

Rank	Title	Year	Director
1	Mon oncle Antoine	1971	Claude Jutra
2	Goin' Down the Road	1970	Don Shebib
3	Good Riddance (Les Bons débarras)	1980	Francis Mankiewicz
4	The Apprenticeship of Duddy Kravitz	1974	Ted Kotcheff
5 (tie)	The Grey Fox	1983	Phillip Borsos
5 (tie)	Orders (Les Ordres)	1974	Michel Brault
7 (tie)	J.A. Martin Photographer	1977	Jean Beaudin
7 (tie)	Pour la suite du monde	1963	Pierre Perrault
9 (tie)	Nobody Waved Goodbye	1964	Don Owen
9 (tie)	The True Nature of Bernadette	1972	Gilles Carle

== Reception ==
TIFF organizers were surprised with the results of the 1984 poll, which provided recognition for what they felt were underappreciated directors such as Claude Jutra, Don Shebib and Gilles Carle. Wayne Clarkson testifying before the Parliament of Canada, remarked on the 1984 list's oldest film being Nobody Waved Goodbye (1964 - though it appears to have been 1963's Pour la suite du monde), asking "How is it that some of this country's most acclaimed films came in the brief 20-year period between 1964 and 1984? That's a very interesting phenomenon for us."

Following the original 1984 list's release, the festival and the Canadian Film Institute collaborated on a touring minifestival to screen the ten films, alongside a selection of short films, in other Canadian cities.

According to encyclopedist Gene Walz, the revisions in 1993 "forced people to rethink their stereotyped notions about Canadian film". The 1993 list was noted for the addition of the first female director, Patricia Rozema, and Mon oncle Antoine being ranked first for a second time, despite the popularity of Oscar-nominated classics Jesus of Montreal and The Decline of the American Empire.

Among the films that dropped off the list after 1993 were Nobody Waved Goodbye and The Grey Fox. Critic Norman Wilner said this was unsurprising, describing the two films as "very much products of their time, and they haven’t aged well".

The 2015 poll saw major changes, including in the number one spot, prompting Steve Gravestock to comment:"This is likely the first time that a film by an indigenous filmmaker has topped a poll of national cinema." The Nunatsiaq News heralded the choice as a sign Atanarjuat: The Fast Runner "has stood the test of time". Eric Moreault, writing for La Presse, dismissed Atanarjuat's first-place finish as nonsensical, noting Mon oncle Antoine topped all previous versions.

John Semley of The Globe and Mail commented that the 2015 list "seems a little heavy on recent movies," but was remarkable for its diversity. The inclusion of more recent films led to the question of whether Canadian cinema was becoming more creative, or if critics were biased to more popular films. Moreault objected to what he saw as too few Quebeckers participating in the vote, saying Incendies (2010) or Mommy (2014) could be included.

Peter Knegt of the Canadian Broadcasting Corporation called the 2015 list "worthy" compared to the alternative list produced by data journalism website The 10 and 3, weighing votes from the Internet Movie Database. That list named Room (2015) as the best Canadian film, followed by the Oscar-nominated Incendies and the holiday cult classic A Christmas Story (1983).

== See also ==
- List of Canadian submissions for the Academy Award for Best Foreign Language Film
- List of films considered the best
- Cinema of Canada
