= The Dame in Colour =

1985 film

- French: La Dame en couleurs
- Directed by: Claude Jutra
- Written by: Louise Rinfret; Claude Jutra
- Produced by: Pierre Lamy
- Starring: Paule Baillargeon
- Cinematography: Thomas Vámos
- Edited by: Claire Boyer
- Release date: 29 January 1985
- Running time: 112 minutes
- Country: Canada
- Language: French

The Dame in Colour (French: La Dame en couleurs) is a 1985 Canadian drama film directed by Claude Jutra. It was entered into the 14th Moscow International Film Festival.

== Plot ==
La Dame en couleurs is set in an insane asylum administered by nuns. Into this harsh place is dumped a truckload of children who soon find an entrance to a long-forgotten underground passage beneath the hospital. There, free from the strict control of the nuns, the children can let their imaginations run free, creating a mystical world of primitive mysteries and cult-like rites.

== Cast ==
- Paule Baillargeon as Sister Gertrude
- Ginette Boivin as Soeur Ste-Anne
- Lisette Dufour as Françoise
- Ariane Frédérique as Gisele
- Charlotte Laurier as Agnes Laberge
- Guillaume Lemay-Thivierge as Ti-Cul
- Jean-François Lesage as Ti-Loup
- Gregory Lussier as Denis Tremblay
- François Méthé as Sebastien
- Gilles Renaud
- Mario Spenard as Regis
