= The Heat Line =

1988 Canadian film directed by Hubert-Yves Rose

- French: La Ligne de chaleur
- Directed by: Hubert-Yves Rose
- Written by: Hubert-Yves Rose; Micheline Lanctôt
- Produced by: Marc Daigle
- Starring: Gabriel Arcand; Gerard Parkes
- Cinematography: Michel Caron
- Edited by: Jean-Pierre Cereghetti; Louise Surprenant
- Music by: Richard Grégoire
- Production company: ACPAV
- Release date: May 1988 (Cannes)
- Running time: 90 minutes
- Country: Canada
- Language: French

The Heat Line (French: La Ligne de chaleur) is a 1988 Canadian drama film, directed by Hubert-Yves Rose. The film stars Gabriel Arcand as Robert Filion, a divorced man who is travelling with his young son Maxime (Simon Gonzalez) to Florida to identify and claim the body of his father Eugène (played by Gérard Poirier in flashbacks and hallucinations) after the older man's death of a sudden heart attack.

The film's cast also includes Gerard Parkes as Norman Simpson, a retired American man they meet on the trip who appears to be trying to ingratiate himself into Robert's life as a replacement father figure, and Charlotte Boisjoli as Robert's mother.

The film premiered in the Directors' Fortnight program at the 1988 Cannes Film Festival, and had its Canadian premiere at the 1988 Toronto International Film Festival.

== Response ==
In his book A Century of Canadian Cinema, Gerald Pratley described the film as "a difficult theme almost lost in the monotony". Writing for Cinema Canada, Jean Chantale reviewed the film more positively, calling it "deeply satisfying" and evocative, and concluding that "La Ligne de Chaleur is like attending your own funeral. It should not be missed. You will marvel at what you learn about relationships you thought you had pegged."

Richard Grégoire received a Genie Award nomination for Best Original Score at the 10th Genie Awards.
