= Reginald H. Morris =

British-Canadian cinematographer (1918–2004)

- Born: Reginald Herbert Morris; July 4, 1918; Ruislip, England
- Died: July 4, 2004 (aged 86)
- Occupation: Cinematographer
- Known for: Empire of the Ants; Porky's

Reginald Herbert Morris (July 4, 1918 – January 8, 2004) was a British-Canadian cinematographer. He was most noted as a three-time Genie Award nominee for Best Cinematography, receiving nominations at the 1st Genie Awards in 1980 for Murder by Decree, at the 2nd Genie Awards in 1981 for Phobia, and at the 5th Genie Awards in 1984 for A Christmas Story.

Born in Ruislip, England, he was the younger brother of cinematographer Oswald Morris. He had a number of credits as a camera assistant in British films of the 1930s and 1940s, before moving to Canada in 1955. He had his first credits as lead cinematographer on short documentary and drama films for the National Film Board of Canada, most notably the 1958 film The Quest. His first credit on a narrative feature film was Don Haldane's 1963 film Drylanders.

His other credits as a cinematographer included the films King of the Grizzlies, Black Christmas, Second Wind, The Food of the Gods, Shadow of the Hawk, Welcome to Blood City, Murder By Decree, Empire of the Ants, Marie-Anne, H. G. Wells' The Shape of Things to Come, Middle Age Crazy, Tribute, Porky's, Murder by Phone, Porky's II: The Next Day, Turk 182 and Loose Cannons, the television miniseries The Fortunate Pilgrim, and episodes of the television series Seaway and The Hitchhiker.
