= Geoffrey Bowes =

Canadian actor

- Born: 15 May 1956 (age 70)
- Occupation: Actor
- Years active: 1978–2018

Geoffrey Bowes (born May 15, 1956) is a Canadian actor. He is most noted for his performance in the 1979 film Something's Rotten, for which he received a Genie Award nomination for Best Actor at the 1st Genie Awards in 1980.

== Career ==
Bowes's roles have included the films Fish Hawk, Middle Age Crazy, War Brides, Jewel, Dirty Pictures and Say Nothing, supporting or guest appearances in the television series Street Legal, F/X: The Series, Wind at My Back, Due South, Degrassi: The Next Generation and This Is Wonderland, voice roles in Babar and The Neverending Story, and stage roles in productions of Thomas Babe's A Prayer for My Daughter, Erika Ritter's Automatic Pilot, David Fennario's Toronto, George F. Walker's Zastrozzi: The Master of Discipline, and Brian Drader's The Norbals. He won a Dora Mavor Moore Award in 1981, as Outstanding Featured Performer in a Play, for his performance in Automatic Pilot.

== Personal life ==
Now semi-retired from acting, he launched his own home renovation company in 2014. In 2018, he published Open Up the Wall, a memoir of his work as a contractor.

== Filmography ==
=== Film ===
Geoffrey Bowes film credits
Year	Title	Role	Notes
1979	Something's Rotten	Prince Calvin	
1979	Fish Hawk	Towsack Charlie	
1980	Middle Age Crazy	Greg	
1980	Hot Dogs (Les chiens chauds)	Maurice	
1981	The Soldier's Story	American soldier	Voice
1999	Judgment Day: The Ellie Nesler Story	Probation Officer	
2001	Say Nothing	Jack	
2005	The Man	Phone Agent	
2012	Hunting Season	Marti	
2012	Stories We Tell	Storyteller	Documentary

=== Television ===
Geoffrey Bowes television credits
Year	Title	Role	Notes
1980	War Brides	Garret	Television film
1981	Jack London's Tales of the Klondike	Billy	Episode: "Finis"
1984	The Edison Twins	Chuck Cavanaugh	Episode: "Double Trouble"
1985	Comedy Factory	Various roles	8 episodes
1987	The Kidnapping of Baby John Doe	Hank	Television film
1988	Mama's Going to Buy You a Mockingbird	John Talbot	Television film
1987–1992	Street Legal	Nathan Goldberg / Doug Somers	6 episodes
1989	War of the Worlds	Colin	Episode: "Unto Us a Child Is Born"
1989	Murder by Night	Young Doctor	Television film
1989	Sorry, Wrong Number	Rob	Television film
1989, 1990	T. and T.	Masked Man / Hendrix	2 episodes
1989–1991	Babar	Additional voices	65 episodes
1991	E.N.G.	Spokesperson	Episode: "Up on the Roof"
1992	Counterstrike	Dr. Menges	Episode: "D.O.A."
1992	Catwalk	George James	Episode: "Billy's Blues"
1993	Gregory K	Jordan McLean	Television film
1993	Matrix	Hogan	Episode: "Shadows from the Past"
1993	The Hidden Room	Adult Mike	Episode: "Jillie"
1994	The Babymaker: The Dr. Cecil Jacobson Story	Dr. Mason	Television film
1994	Kung Fu: The Legend Continues	Blake Ralston	Episode: "Only the Strong Survive"
1995–1996	The Neverending Story	Barney	23 episodes
1996	Goosebumps	Mr. Tucker	2 episodes
1996	Hostile Advances	Mike	Television film
1996	Psi Factor	Blaine McCallister	Episode: "Dream House/UFO Encounter"
1996	F/X: The Series	Hossick	Episode: "Target"
1997	Time to Say Goodbye?	Stroup's Assistant	Television film
1997	Johnny 2.0	APS Commander	Television film
1998	When Husbands Cheat	Minister	Television film
1998	Due South	Larry	2 episodes
1998	Evidence of Blood	Young Horace Talbott	Television film
1999	Ultimate Deception	Hay	Television film
1999	If You Believe	George Stone	Television film
2000	Dirty Pictures	Suit	Television film
2000	On Hostile Ground	Frank, Chief Engineer	Television film
2001	The Associates	Mr. Castillo	Episode: "Disclosure"
2001	Jewel	Dr. Beaudry	Television film
2001	Wind at My Back	Willie Easterbrook	2 episodes
2001	Sex, Lies & Obsession	Carl	Television film
2001	A Taste of Shakespeare	Kent / Narrator	Episode: "King Lear"
2001, 2004	Degrassi: The Next Generation	Todd McGregor	2 episodes
2002	Recipe for Murder	Julius Klein	Television film
2003	DC 9/11: Time of Crisis	Tom Daschle	Television film
2004	Hustle	Tommy Helms	Television film
