= 1980 in Canadian television =

The following is a list of events affecting Canadian television in 1980. Events listed include television show debuts, finales, cancellations, and channel launches.

== Events ==
Date	Event
February 18	The first Royal Canadian Air Farce television special airs on CBC Television.
February 18	Live coverage of the 1980 Canadian election airs on all the main networks.
March 20	The 1st genie awards aired on CBC Television.
April 2	Juno Awards of 1980
May 20	Live coverage of the 1980 Quebec referendum airs on all the main television networks.

=== Debuts ===
Show	Station	Premiere Date
The Alan Thicke Show	CTV	September 18
Bizarre	CTV	September 18
North America: Growth of a Continent	TVOntario	September 18
Up at Ours	CBC Television	October 2
Home Fires	CBC Television	November 9

=== Ending this year ===
Show	Station	Cancelled
King of Kensington	CBC Television	March 13
Ombudsman	CBC Television	April 20
Canadian Express	CBC Television	September 12
Cities	CBC Television	Unknown
Parlez-moi	TVOntario	Unknown

== Television shows ==
=== 1950s ===
- Country Canada (1954–2007)
- CBC News Magazine (1952–1981)
- The Friendly Giant (1958–1985)
- Hockey Night in Canada (1952–present)
- The National (1954–present)
- Front Page Challenge (1957–1995)
- Wayne and Shuster Show (1958–1989)

=== 1960s ===
- CTV National News (1961–present)
- Land and Sea (1964–present)
- Man Alive (1967–2000)
- Mr. Dressup (1967–1996)
- The Nature of Things (1960–present, scientific documentary series)
- Question Period (1967–present, news program)
- Reach for the Top (1961–1985)
- Take 30 (1962–1983)
- The Tommy Hunter Show (1965–1992)
- University of the Air (1966–1983)
- W-FIVE (1966–present, newsmagazine program)

=== 1970s ===
- The Beachcombers (1972–1990)
- Canada AM (1972–present, news program)
- Celebrity Cooks (1975–1984)
- City Lights (1973–1989)
- Definition (1974–1989)
- the fifth estate (1975–present, newsmagazine program)
- Flappers (1979–1981)
- Grand Old Country (1975–1981)
- The Great Detective (1979–1982)
- Headline Hunters (1972–1983)
- Let's Go (1976–1984)
- The Littlest Hobo (1979–1985)
- Live It Up! (1978–1990)
- The Mad Dash (1978–1985)
- Marketplace (1972–present, newsmagazine program)
- Polka Dot Door (1971-1993)
- Read All About It! (1979–1983)
- Second City Television (1976–1984)
- Smith & Smith (1979–1985)
- This Land (1970–1982)
- You Can't Do That on Television (1979–1990)
- V.I.P. (1973–1983)
- The Watson Report (1975–1981)
- 100 Huntley Street (1977–present, religious program)

== TV movies ==
- Harvest
- Lyon's Den
- Maintain the Right
- A Population of One
- A Question of the Sixth
- War Brides
- The Winnings of Frankie Walls

== Television stations ==
=== Debuts ===
Date	Market	Station	Channel	Affiliation	Notes/References
Unknown	Kenora, Ontario	CJBN-TV	13	CTV	Shut down January 28 2017

== Births ==
Date	Name	Notability
June 12	Kawa Ada	Actor (The Breadwinner)
October 6	David Alpay	Actor

== See also ==
- 1980 in Canada
- List of Canadian films of 1980
