= En résidence (TV series) =

Canadian TV series

- Genre: Comedy
- Created by: Marcel Gallant, Caley Gibson
- Directed by: Christian Essiambre
- Starring: France Castel, Germain Houde, Roc Lafortune, Pierrette Robitaille, Mathieu Girard, Isabelle Cyr, Karl-Antoine Suprice, Frédérique Cyr-Deschênes, Tiffany Montambault
- Country of origin: Canada
- Original language: French
- No. of seasons: 1
- No. of episodes: 13

Production
- Producers: Marcel Gallant, Chris Goguen, André Roy, Marc Savoie
- Cinematography: Blake Stilwell
- Production company: Connexions Productions

Original release
- Network: Unis
- Release: September 3, 2024 – present

En résidence is a Canadian television series produced by Connexions Productions and airing on Unis TV. The series stars France Castel, Germain Houde and Roc Lafortune. as residents of a retirement home that must accommodate a group of university students after their dormitory burns down. The series was created by Marcel Gallant and Caley Gibson, and directed by Christian Essiambre. En résidence began airing in September 2024 with a 13-episode first season.

== Cast ==
- France Castel as Doris
- Germain Houde as Isidore
- Roc Lafortune as Marcel
- Pierrette Robitaille as Rosemonde
- Matthieu Girard as Dugas
- Isabelle Cyr as Isabelle
- Karl-Antoine Suprice as JF
- Frédérique Cyr-Deschênes as Camille
- Tiffany Montambault as Anne-Sophie

== Production ==
The series was filmed in Shediac, New Brunswick during Summer 2023.
