= Some Even Fall in Love =

1980 film by Guy Simoneau

- French: Plusieurs tombent en amour
- Directed by: Guy Simoneau
- Produced by: Guy Simoneau
- Cinematography: Jean-Pierre Bruneau; Martial Filion; Richard Saint-Pierre
- Edited by: Guy Simoneau
- Production company: Les Films du Crépuscule
- Distributed by: Les Films du Crépuscule
- Release date: 1980
- Running time: 107 minutes
- Country: Canada
- Language: French

Some Even Fall in Love (French: Plusieurs tombent en amour) is a Canadian documentary film, produced and directed by Guy Simoneau and released in 1980.

The film won the Genie Award for Best Feature Length Documentary at the 2nd Genie Awards.

== Synopsis ==
The film profiles a number of sex workers in Montreal, including both women and men, and both cisgender and transgender workers.

One of the film's subjects interviewed told Simoneau: "since relationships between men and women are screwed up why not get paid?", while another subject opined it was hard to have sex with men she thought were ugly: "sleeping with a client you are not attracted to is like being a taxi driver and taking on a fare; when the customer leaves, it's all over," and one of the male prostitutes claims: "I don't sleep with the guy, I sleep with his money."

A pimp interviewed said that while he could not stand anyone who has to pay for sex, he "does his job as a service to the women because 'in everything you need a boss'." He also stated that those women who try to go "independent" do not live very long.

A client who gave an interview, said he had been seeing prostitutes since he was 18. He opined that "it's too difficult to get women for free; you have to get to know them, take them to movies."

== Background ==
The film's title was derived from one of the transsexuals featured in the documentary who told Simoneau — "many fall in love — many clients that is." Simoneau went on to say:

25 per cent of the time, there is no actual sex in meetings with prostitutes. It's known and it's easily proven: With a prostitute one doesn't necessarily buy sex. The client often simply asks to be listened to. He talks about his wife, about his problems, he pays and then leaves.

Several weeks before the film opened, it received widespread publicity with graffiti appearing all over Montreal simply stating – "Plusieurs Tombent en Amour."

== Reception ==
Canadian film critic Jay Scott wrote "the direction is pedestrian, the information valuable; the picture is broader than Tony Garnett's exceptional Prostitute, but not as deep." The Canadian Press observed that "a few shots are out of focus and parts of the soundtrack can't be heard properly, but then, technical perfection might seem out of place in a film dealing with prostitution in the seedier sections of Montreal's St. Lawrence Boulevard, known as The Main." They also noted that it had been "drawing record crowds to the downtown Quimetoscope cinema."

Richard Labonté of The Ottawa Citizen was not impressed with the film, opining: "it's such a boringly typical head-and-shoulders film, intercut with some muted bump-and-grind music and the occasional customer-in-the-street interview; add its static style to a pace which would please any snail, mix in the fact that random selection of interviews is evidently part of Simoneau's credo, and get ready to snooze."

Richard Gay from Le Devoir thought Simoneau could have done a better job of editing the film, commenting: "his knowledge of this particular environment; the astonishing encounters he had there undoubtedly made the elimination process difficult; we feel that the researcher-director-editor could not accept that certain scenes remain on the editing table; however, his film would have benefited from being shorter, less repetitive, with less relaxed editing and a more sustained rhythm."

== See also ==
- Cinema of Canada
- List of films shot in Montreal
- List of Canadian films of 1980
- List of LGBTQ-related films of 1980
