= 2 Seconds =

1998 Canadian drama film

- Theatrical release poster
- French: 2 Secondes
- Directed by: Manon Briand
- Written by: Manon Briand
- Produced by: Roger Frappier
- Starring: Charlotte Laurier; Dino Tavarone; Jonathan Bolduc; Suzanne Clément; Louise Forestier; André Brassard
- Cinematography: Louise Archambault; Pierre Crépô; James Gray
- Edited by: Richard Comeau
- Music by: Dominique Grand; Sylvain-Charles Grand
- Production company: Max Films Productions
- Release date: September 12, 1998 (Canada)
- Running time: 100 minutes
- Country: Canada
- Languages: English and French interchangeably

2 Seconds (French: 2 secondes) is a 1998 Canadian drama film. This film premiered in 1999 at the Sundance Film Festival. Written and directed by Manon Briand, 2 Seconds stars Charlotte Laurier as Laurie, a bisexual woman who takes a job as a bike courier in Montreal after being fired from her previous job as a professional downhill racer.

== Synopsis ==
Laurie is forcefully retired as a downhill racer when her concerns about her signs of aging cause her to lose her last race by 2 seconds (hence the name of the movie). Laurie and the one bike she was allowed to keep then move in with her geeky, physics-loving brother who is trying very hard to find a girlfriend. While putting her bike together, Laurie discovers that she is missing a gear on her bicyclette so she makes do with what she has. Because of this, she breaks the chain on her bike one day, leading to her meeting with her soon-to-be best friend Lorenzo. Lorenzo is an ex Italian professional racer who currently works as a bike mechanic in his own bike shop. offered her a job at the bicycle company, but one of her co workers, Willie, tries to make her life miserable. After talking to Lorenzo, Laurie figures out what she needs to do to help herself and try to resolve things.

== Cast ==
- Charlotte Laurier as Laurie, a professional downhill racer who gets fired because of her slight overindulgence in irresponsibility
- Dino Tavarone as Lorenzo, an ex Italian professional racer who currently works as a bike mechanic in his own bike shop
- Jonathan Bolduc as Jeune Lorenzo
- Suzanne Clément as La Bella, Laurie's love interest
- Yves P. Pelletier as Steff
- Louise Forestier as Laurie's Mother

== Reception ==
=== Critical reception ===
Brendan Kelly of Variety praised the film, saying "there is no shortage of nifty visual flourishes. . .Soundtrack is an appropriately cool urban mix of jazz and modern-rock sounds." The Melbourne International Film Festival called it "An understated film with an extraordinarily simple premise"

== Awards ==
Year	Award	Category	Recipients	Results
1998	Montreal World Film Festival	Best Canadian Film	Manon Briand	Won
1998	Montreal World Film Festival	Best Director	Manon Briand	Won
1998	Montreal World Film Festival	Montréal award of the best First Fiction Film	Manon Briand	Won
1998	Montreal World Film Festival	Grand Prix des Ameriques	Manon Briand	Nominated
1998	Montreal World Film Festival	FedEx Award of the best Canadian Film	2 secondes (Manon Briand)	Won
1998	Namur International Festival of French-Speaking Film	Best First Screenplay	Manon Briand	Won
1999	1st Jutra Awards	Best Picture	Roger Frappier	Nominated
1999	1st Jutra Awards	Best Director	Manon Briand	Nominated
1999	1st Jutra Awards	Best Actor	Dino Tavarone	Nominated
1999	1st Jutra Awards	Best Actress	Charlotte Laurier	Nominated
1999	1st Jutra Awards	Best Screenplay	Manon Briand	Nominated
1999	1st Jutra Awards	Best Sound	Yvon Benoît, Martin Pinsonnault, Hans Peter Strobl, Louis Hone	Nominated
1999	1st Jutra Awards	Best Editing	Richard Comeau	Nominated

== See also ==
- List of films about bicycles and cycling
- List of LGBT films directed by women
