= Jack London's Tales of the Klondike =

Canadian drama television miniseries

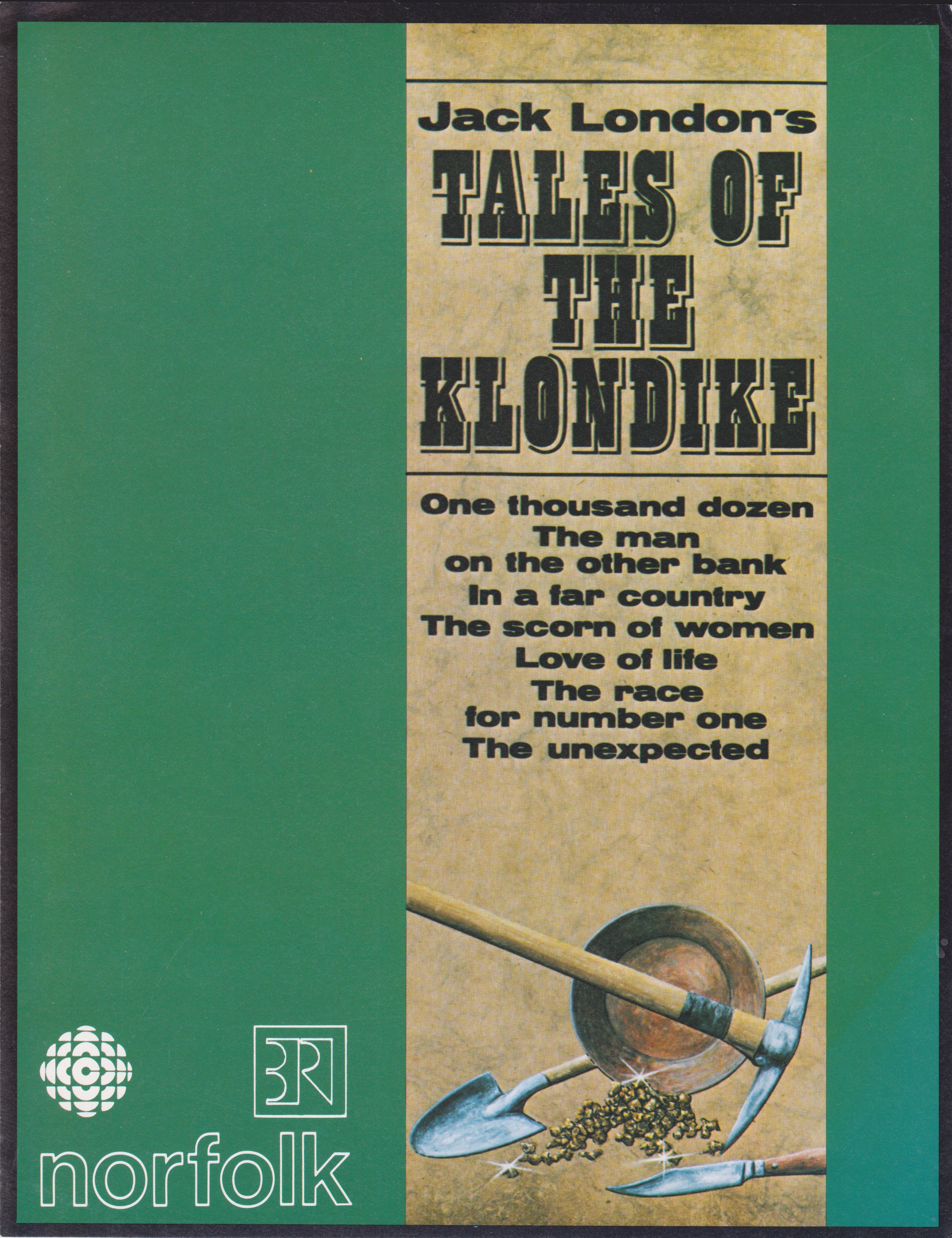
- Series sales brochure
- Genre: Drama
- Narrated by: Orson Welles
- Country of origin: Canada
- Original language: English
- No. of seasons: 1
- No. of episodes: 7

Production
- Producer: William I. Macadam
- Running time: 7 X 60 minutes
- Production company: Norfolk Communications

Original release
- Network: CBC Television
- Release: 16 May – 21 June 1981

Jack London's Tales of the Klondike is a Canadian television drama miniseries produced by William Macadam's Norfolk Communications that aired on CBC Television in 1981 and in the UK, Germany, France and other countries around the world as a "Norfolk production" by William I. Macadam.

== Premise ==
This series of seven 52 minute 16mm colour films made for television episodes featured dramatised versions of Jack London's works, narrated by Orson Welles. and included in the international cast Eva Gabor, John Candy, Robert Carradine, Scott Hylands, Cherie Lunghi, Mavor Moore, Neil Munro, John Ireland, Linda Sorenson, Geoffrey Bowes, Chris Wiggins and Tom Butler.

When George Washington Carmack struck gold in the Klondike on August 17, 1896, Jack London was a struggling writer in San Francisco.The lure of gold was irresistible and he joined the many thousands on their trek to Canada's harsh northwestern frontier. Many died, most were unlucky, only a few struck it rich.

Jack London never found gold. Instead he discovered many true stories which formed the basis of his Tales of the Klondike. and this television series.

Among the many thousands who made the long trek to Canada's northwest frontier during the Klondike gold rush was a writer from San Francisco, Jack London. His stories could effectively evoke images of harsh Arctic landscape and its inhabitants.

== Scheduling ==
The seven part television hour-long series (52 minute running time allowing for commercials at beginning and end) was broadcast by CBC in Canada on Sundays at 8:00 p.m. (Eastern) from 16 May to 21 June 1981. It was rebroadcast on Fridays from 14 May to 18 June 1982. It was also broadcast with French subtitles by the CBC/Radio-Canada in Quebec. The series was broadcast in the UK on Channel 4, and in France, Germany and a number of countries around the world.

== Episodes, lead actors, screenwriters and directors ==
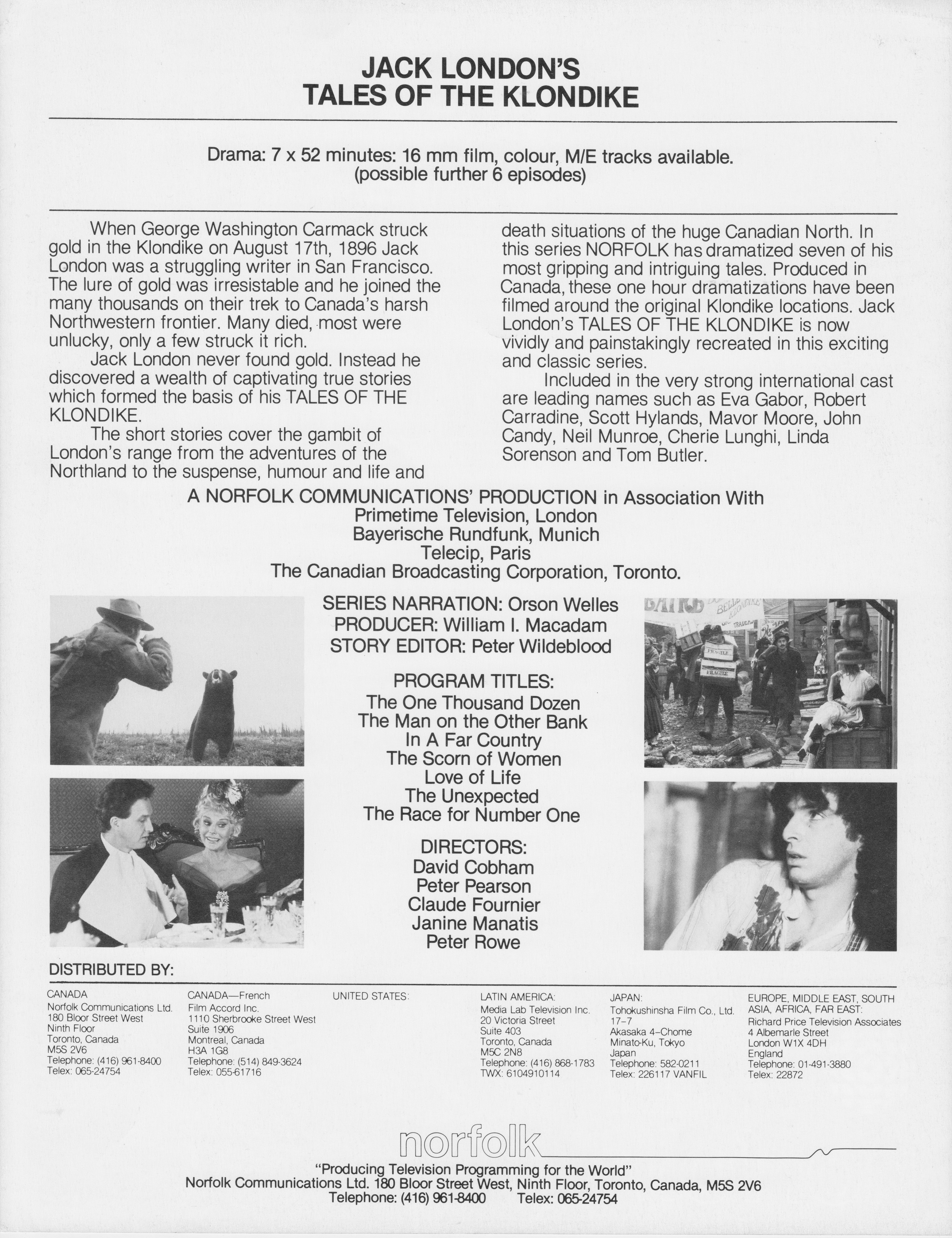
Details from sales brochure

The One Thousand Dozen

Starring Neil Munro and Ray Whelan. Screenplay by Robert B. Carney, Directed by Peter Rowe

Love of Life

Starring Doug McGrath. Directed by David Cobham

In A Far Country

Starring Scott Hylands and Robert Carradine. Screenplay by Carol Bolt. Directed by Janine Manatis.

Scorn of Women

Starring Eva Gabor, Tom Butler, Kerrie Keane, Sarah Torgov and Linda Sorenson. Screenplay by R.B. Carney, Directed by Claude Fournier.

Finis

Starring Stephen McHattie, Geoffrey Bowes and Chris Wiggins, Screenplay by Robert B. Carney, Directed by David Cobham

The Unexpected

Starring John Candy, Cherie Lunghi, Mavor Moore and Patrick Brymer. Screenplay by Robert B. Carney with Ratch Wallace. Directed by Peter Pearson

The Race For Number One

Starring David Ferry, George Buza and John Ireland. Directed by David Cobham

== Series main production personnel ==
Producer: William I. Macadam

Series Film Editor: Stephen Lawrence

Series Assistant Film Editor: Gillian Jones

Series Story Editor: Peter Wildeblood

Series Production Manager: Duane Howard

Series Assistant Director: John Bell

Series Production Supervisor: John A. Delmage

Unit Manager: Nicole Tardif

Production Accountants:
Mark Moore
Cynde Scott
Jeff W. Long
Marr Morgan
Martha Porter

Production Co-Ordinator: Paul Kent

== Norfolk's co-production (presale) partners ==
Canadian Broadcasting Corporation, Toronto

Channel 4, London

Bayerischer Rundfunk, Munich

Telecip, Paris

S.E.P.I., Milan

Primetime Television, London

== Book published to coincide with the series airing ==
Tales of the Klondike – Jack London. Penguin Books republished the Jack London stories to coincide with the release of the television series using the title fonts and style and cover photos from the series.
