= Beau temps, mauvais temps =

Québécois television series (1955-58)

Beau temps, mauvais temps is a Québécois television series that ran from 1955 to 1958. It debuted on 11 November 1958.

== Synopsis ==
Radio-Canada presented 96 episodes of this series, which is set in the small town of Villeneuve. The series tells the story of working- and middle-class youth from the town.

== Cast ==
- Pierre Boucher
- Robert Boulanger
- Elisabeth Briand
- René Caron
- Monique Champagne
- Élizabeth Chouvalidzé
- Gilbert Comptois
- Lucille Cousineau
- Pierre Dagenais
- Pierre Daigneault
- Jean Fontaine
- Marc Forrez
- Marie Fresnières
- Bertrand Gagnon
- Jacques Galipeau
- Roger Garand
- Lucille Gauthier
- Marc Gélinas
- Benoît Girard
- Roger Gravel
- Jocelyn Joty
- Carmen Judd
- Michelle Juneau
- Alexis Kanner
- Suzanne Langlois
- Fernande Larivière
- Lise Lasalle
- Armand Leguet
- Hubert Loiselle
- Thérèse Mackinnon
- Aimé Major
- Jacques Marineau
- Louise Marleau
- Jean-Pierre Masson
- Francine Montpetit
- Denise Morelle
- Marthe Nadeau
- André Pagé
- Lucille Papineau
- Jani Pascal
- Gérard Poirier
- Denjse Provost
- Lucie Ranger
- Louise Rémy
- Madeleine Sicotte
- Olivette Thibault
- Luce Triganne

== Set designer ==
- Lise Lavallée

== Directors/Producers ==
- Jean-Louis Béland
- Paul Blouin
- René Boissay
