= Say Nothing (film) =

2001 film

- DVD cover
- Directed by: Allan Moyle
- Written by: Madeline Sunshine
- Produced by: Carlo Liconti; Andrew Pfeffer; Donald Zuckerman
- Starring: William Baldwin; Nastassja Kinski; Hart Bochner
- Cinematography: Walter Bal
- Edited by: James Bredin
- Distributed by: Artisan Entertainment
- Release date: December 16, 2001
- Running time: 94 minutes
- Country: United States
- Language: English

Say Nothing is a 2001 drama, romance, and thriller film written by Madeline Sunshine and directed by Allan Moyle. The film stars William Baldwin, Nastassja Kinski, and Hart Bochner.

== Cast ==
- William Baldwin as Julian
- Nastassja Kinski as Grace
- Hart Bochner as Matt
- Jordy Benattar as Casey
- Michelle Duquet as Christine
- Geoffrey Bowes as Jack
- Susie Dias as Lupe
- Andy Velasquez as Carlos
- Brooke Johnson as Margo Loring
- Jaymz Bee as Concierge
- Giuseppe Mercurio as Restaurant Host
- Samantha Espie as Linda
- Matt Gordon as Tony
- Sean MacMahon as Dooley Griffin
- Nicole Sherman as Rita
