= The Neverending Story (TV series) =

- Genre: Fantasy
- Based on: The Neverending Story by Michael Ende
- Developed by: Peter Sauder
- Directed by: Mike Fallows
- Starring: Christopher Bell
- Voices of: Janet-Laine Green; Dominic Zamprogna; Chris Wiggins; Christopher Bell; Neil Crone; Marilyn Lightstone; Benedict Campbell; John McGrath; Lisa Yamanaka; Richard Binsley; James Rankin; John Stocker; Colin Fox; Dan Hennessey; Gary Krawford; Howard Jerome; Don Francks; Wayne Robson; Len Carlson; Ellen-Ray Hennessy; Geoffrey Bowes; Harvey Atkin; Jayne Eastwood
- Composer: Milan Kymlicka
- Countries of origin: Canada; France; Germany
- Original language: English
- No. of seasons: 1
- No. of episodes: 26

Production
- Production companies: CineVox Entertainment; Ellipse Programmé; Nelvana

Original release
- Network: HBO (United States); Family Channel (Canada)
- Release: 2 December 1995 – 25 May 1996

The Neverending Story, also known as The Animated Adventures of Bastian Balthazar Bux or The Neverending Story: The Complete Animated Series, is an animated television series, produced by CineVox Entertainment and animated by Ellipse Animation and Nelvana Limited. It aired for one season (1995–1996) on HBO, and ran for 26 episodes. In Canada, it also aired on Family Channel. The series is loosely based on Michael Ende's book, The Neverending Story (1979).

== Plot ==
A young boy named Bastian helps yet again the Childlike Empress and her people of Fantasia, an imaginary land that can be accessed and influenced through a magical book called The Neverending Story, because the horrifying Nothing and other villains like the evil sorceress Xayide still threaten it. In the process, Bastian learns valuable lessons and gains many magical friends like the wooden Bark Troll, the luckdragon Falkor and many others.

== Differences between the TV series and the film ==
In the series, the Nothing is a recurring villain. The Nothing is portrayed as a black hole with evil red eyes, which belongs to that of a white wolf, and is the television version of Gmork. The evil sorceress Xayide, unlike in the first sequel film, wears green robes with an eye mask with yellow slits. In the original film, her face is created by a special magical cream. The Rockbiter, in the latter two sequel films (including the third film), actually has a wife and a son, Junior. His wife and son appear in the series as well.

== Cast and characters ==
- Janet-Laine Green as Xayide
- Dominic Zamprogna as Atreyu
- Chris Wiggins as Carl Conrad Coreander
- Christopher Bell as Bastian Balthazar Bux
- Neil Crone as Nimbly
- Marilyn Lightstone as Ygramul
- Benedict Campbell as Shadow Goblin
- John McGrath as Blubb
- Lisa Yamanaka as The Childlike Empress and Junior Rockbiter
- Richard Binsley as Barktroll
- James Rankin as Three Head
- John Stocker as Gluckuk, Gluckuk's racing snail
- Colin Fox as Large Head
- Pam Hyatt as Morla
- Ellen-Ray Hennessy as Southern Oracle
- Dan Hennessey as South Wind Giant
- Gary Krawford as Grograman the fire lion
- Howard Jerome as Falkor the luckdragon
- Don Francks as Gmork
- Wayne Robson as Engywook
- Barbara Bryne as Urgl
- Len Carlson as Vermin
- Geoffrey Bowes as Barney Bux
- Harvey Atkin as Rockbiter, Mr. Rockchewer
- Jayne Eastwood as Mrs. Rockchewer

== Episodes ==
No.	Title	Written by	Original release date
1	"The Tears of Sadness"	Peter Sauder	2 December 1995
When Bastian arrives in Fantasia he discovers that some of the citizens have turned into frozen statues. Realizing it is coming from the water, Bastian collects a strange potion from Urgl and travels with Bark Troll and Falkor to the Fountain of Life.
2	"The Meek and the Mighty"	J.D. Smith	9 December 1995
Bastian arrives in the Tinies Village to see that it has once again been demolished by Junior.
3	"The Purple Buffalo"	Alan Templeton & Mary Crawford	16 December 1995
When Bastian arrives on the Grassy Plains of the Greenskin tribe, he finds out that the Purple Buffalo have disappeared along with his great warrior friend, Atreyu.
4	"Morla's Wish"	Story by : Erika Strobel; Teleplay by : Bob Ardiel	23 December 1995
Bastian is on his way to see Morla, the giant turtle that lives in the Swamp of Sadness. The Nothing finds out about this and sets a trap.
5	"Spook City"	Story by : Erika Strobel; Teleplay by : Alan Templeton & Mary Crawford	30 December 1995
In the Forbidden Forest, Bastian meets a scared little spook named Gaya, who tells Bastian about her brother Meeka's capture into Spook City.
6	"To Save Falkor"	Story by : Erika Strobel; Teleplay by : Alan Templeton & Mary Crawford	6 January 1996
When Bastian has the flu, he takes little notice of doctor's orders to stay in bed, choosing to visit his friends in Fantasia instead, but is forced into a desperate quest when his cold does the impossible and makes Falkor sick.
7	"Missing Memories"	Story by : Erika Strobel & Dennise Fordham; Teleplay by : Frank Diteljan & Nicola Barton	13 January 1996
When huge pieces of Fantasia are beginning to disappear, including the Childlike Empress' memories, it is up to Bastian to find out what is going on before he and his friends are 'erased' as well.
8	"Perilin"	Story by : John de Klein & Dennise Fordham; Teleplay by : Peter Sauder	20 January 1996
When Grograman, the Fire Lion, gets captured and Perilin, the Night Forest, starts spreading to the rest of Fantasia, only Bastian can help.
9	"The Sea of Mist"	Story by : Erika Strobel; Teleplay by : J.D. Smith	27 January 1996
When Engywook returns from an exploration in the Sea of Mist, he shows Bastian his rare find: the Ancient Sea Scrolls, which legends say holds the answers to all of Fantasia's mysteries.
10	"Promises"	Vince Grittani	3 February 1996
When giant fissures crack through the Grassy Plains, Bastian follows the great warrior Atreyu, and his sister Saiya back to the Greenskins camp to discover its source.
11	"Through the Misty Mountains"	Story by : Dale Schott; Teleplay by : Frank Diteljan	10 February 1996
Bastian investigates the rumors of a monster inhabiting the Misty Mountains.
12	"A Friendship That Flames"	Nicola Barton	17 February 1996
When Bark Troll is jealous of Bastian's newly formed friendship with an interesting character named Axin, he goes to all limits to prove he is the better friend.
13	"The Three Feeling Stones"	Bruce Robb	24 February 1996
The story begins with Xayide successfully unearthing two of the three ancient Feeling Stones of Fantasia, purposely removing all the good feelings across the land.
14	"The Belt of Invisibility"	Story by : Michaela Rothmund; Teleplay by : Bob Ardiel	2 March 1996
Shadow Goblin and Vermin find a Belt of Invisibility and they use it to commit various thefts. To combat this, Bastian ends up having to turn to Xayide for help.
15	"Good Deeds"	Story by : Dale Schott; Teleplay by : Bob Ardiel	9 March 1996
Bastian arrives to see that Bark Troll has been pleasantly rewarded (with faerie dust) for his efforts when he inadvertently helps a town of Faeries.
16	"Bark Troll's Blame"	Erika Strobel	16 March 1996
When a fire erupts in the Howling Forest, all eyes cast suspicious blame on Bark Troll.
17	"The Searcher"	Alan Templeton & Mary Crawford	23 March 1996
When Engywook takes the egg of a Llorp, mistaking it for the crystal key to the Vault of Wisdom, he travels on an expedition to the Land of Cold Fire to obtain all the knowledge he can.
18	"End of Time"	Alan Templeton & Mary Crawford	30 March 1996
Bastian arrives in Fantasia to see the world and all his friends slowly winding down into a world of suspended animation.
19	"Thunder and Lightning"	Story by : Dale Schott; Teleplay by : Nicola Barton	6 April 1996
When the Gnomic Forest is experiencing a devastating drought, Engywook doubles his efforts to build a Rain-Making Machine.
20	"The Everlasting Night"	Story by : Erika Strobel; Teleplay by : Bob Ardiel	13 April 1996
When Xayide misuses a stolen recipe book of Urgls to concoct a spell, it only backfires and sends her into a deep sleeping trance.
21	"After the Falls"	Story by : Dale Schott; Teleplay by : Bob Ardiel	20 April 1996
When Bark Troll crushes on a beautiful tree named Willow and is challenged by a brute named Ash, it is Bastian who convinces Bark Troll to accept Ash's challenge to log roll on Splinter Falls.
22	"Mirror, Mirror"	Joel Berger	27 April 1996
Xayide uses a special mirror that creates an evil version of Bastian and a good version of herself.
23	"The Dreaming Fields"	Story by : Erika Strobel; Teleplay by : Laurel L. Russwurm	4 May 1996
Xayide has placed Nightmare Weeds into the Dreaming Fields which causes everyone's dreams to come true until it goes horribly awry.
24	"The Atonal Trolls"	Story by : Ken Sobel; Teleplay by : Frank Diteljan	11 May 1996
When the shrieking Atonal Trolls abandon their homeland, the Mountains of Harmony, and head towards the Ivory Tower, they threaten its very existence with the decibel level of their shrieking voices.
25	"The Race for the Ivory Tower"	Story by : Erika Strobel; Teleplay by : Peter Sauder	18 May 1996
Everyone in Fantasia (with the exception of Falkor, as his luck would give him an unfair advantage) is participating in The Race including Gluckuck on his racing Snail, Mr. Rockchewer on his stone bicycle, Engywook on his Kitzblitz Flying Machine, and Night Hob aboard his sleepy bat Thessle.
26	"The Perfect Gift"	Story by : Erika Strobel; Teleplay by : Bob Ardiel	25 May 1996
Bastian arrives in Fantasia hoping to find the perfect gift idea for Father's Day. Final episode

== Telecast and home media ==
The Neverending Story was first aired on HBO in 1995 until 1996. Repeats were aired on HBO's sister channel, HBO Family, until 2005. In Canada, it also aired on Family Channel. Internationally, the show was aired on Nickelodeon (UK and Latin America), Canal+ (France) and Kindernet (the Netherlands).

- In 1996, a single episode of The Neverending Story: The Animated Adventures of Bastian Balthazar Bux was released by HBO Home Entertainment (under the HBO Kids Video branch).
- In 2005, the first three episodes of The Neverending Story: The Animated Adventures were released on DVD by FUNimation Entertainment, LTD. (under its Our Time Family Entertainment children's/pre-school entertainment label) in a compilation entitled "Bastian to the Rescue".
- Via Vision Entertainment released the complete series on NTSC Region 0 DVD in Australia, in 2024. The Via Vision Entertainment DVD is able to play in North American Region DVD players.
- As of 2022, all episodes were available on Amazon Prime.
