= La Petite Patrie =

Television series

La Petite Patrie (French pronunciation: [la pətit patʁi]) is a French Canadian media franchise about coming of age in Montreal, Quebec in the 1940s.

The title and premise are shared by three works: A novel by Claude Jasmin loosely based on his own adolescence and published in 1972, a television situation comedy series broadcast on the national Radio-Canada network from 1974 to 1976, and a graphic novel with story by Claude Jasmin, script by Normand Grégoire, and illustrations by Julie Rocheleau, published in 2015.

The municipal borough in which it the story is set, Rosemont, was officially renamed Rosemont–La Petite-Patrie in honour of the series. The series was reaired in 2023 on Ici ARTV.

La Petite Patrie tells the life of a district of Montreal (Villeray) formed by the quadrilateral of the streets Saint-Denis, Beaubien, St-Hubert and Bélanger shortly after World War II, between 1946 and 1948.

The main character and narrator of the television series is Clément Germain, a 16-year-old teenager who lived in this district with his family. Through the memories of Clément, viewers discovered this neighborhood during the years of Duplessis; with its trams, its ice deliverymen, its guénillou and its anglophone Chinese launderer among others. At that time, bread cost 11 cents, Maurice Richard was at the peak of his glory and the Rivoli theatre had not yet been replaced by a Jean-Coutu Pharmacy.

== Television series cast ==
- Vincent Bilodeau (Clément Germain)
- René Caron (Léon Germain )
- Mariette Duval (Madame Laramée)
- Janine Fluet (Paulette)
- Michel Forget (Roland Patry)
- Jacques Galipeau (Edmond Germain)
- Louise Laparé (Lucie Germain)
- Gaston Lepage (Édouard Germain)
- Robert Maltais (Yvon Ranger)
- Christiane Pasquier (Murielle Germain)
- Gilles Pellerin (Monsieur Gloutnez)
- Denise Proulx (Aline)
- Louise Rinfret (Marie-Paule Germain)
- Gisèle Schmidt (Gertrude Germain)
- Yvon Thiboutot (Coco-la-guerre)
- Jacques Thisdale (Hervé Prud'Homme)
