= Charlotte Boisjoli =

Canadian actress, director, writer and educator (1923–2001)

Charlotte Boisjoli (June 12, 1923 – January 30, 2001) was a Canadian actress, director, writer and educator in Quebec, Canada.

She was born in Quebec City and first performed with the theatre group Compagnons de Saint-Laurent. She earned a master's degree in musicology.

Boisjoli appeared in the television series Sous un ciel variable. During the 1950s, she provided the voice for the character Pépinot on the television show Pepinot and Capucine. She also performed on stage and on the radio.

She was co-founder and director of the École de théâtre ABC. She taught dramatic arts at various schools.

In 1987, she became secretary general for the Fédération internationale des écrivains de langue française.

Boisjoli died of cancer at the age of 77 in Montreal. Her memorial is located at the Notre Dame des Neiges Cemetery.

Her son Jean-François Doré was a Quebec radio and television personality.

Rue Charlotte-Boisjoli in Boisbriand was named in her honour.

== Works ==
- It Can't Be Winter, We Haven't Had Summer Yet (Ça peut pas être l'hiver, on n'a même pas eu d'été) - 1980
- La Chatte blanche - 1981
- Le Dragon vert - 1983
- Dis-moi qui je suis : exercices d'improvisation - 1984
- The Heat Line (La ligne de chaleur) - 1987
- 13, rue de Buci - 1989
- Jacynthe - 1990
