= The Hounds of Notre Dame =

Hounds of Notre Dame
- Directed by: Zale Dalen
- Written by: Ken Mitchell
- Produced by: Fil Fraser
- Starring: Thomas Peacocke; Frances Hyland; Barry Morse; David Ferry
- Cinematography: Ron Orieux
- Edited by: Barry Freeman
- Music by: Maurice Marshall
- Production companies: Famous Players; Fraser Films; Pere Films
- Distributed by: Pan-Canadian Film Distributors
- Release date: October 10, 1980
- Running time: 99 minutes
- Country: Canada
- Language: English
- Budget: $ 1,200,000

The Hounds of Notre Dame is a 1980 Canadian drama film directed by Zale Dalen.

== Plot ==
The Hounds of Notre Dame is about 36 hours in the life of Père Athol Murray, a hard-drinking, chain-smoking Catholic priest, teacher, political activist and coach of the school hockey team, The Hounds. Peacocke gives a powerful performance as Murray, who defies his superior and gives anti-CCF (Co-operative Commonwealth Federation) speeches in 1940s Saskatchewan. The film received outstanding reviews and Peacocke won a Genie Award for best actor, but it received only limited distribution and came to symbolize the problems inherent in producing quality Canadian features.

== Reception ==
- The film earned 9 Genie Award nominations in 1981 in the categories of:
  - Best Performance by an Actor in a Leading Role - Thomas Peacocke (won)
  - Best Achievement in Direction
  - Best Achievement in Editing
  - Best Achievement in Overall Sound
  - Best Achievement in Sound Editing
  - Best Motion Picture
  - Best Performance by an Actor in a Supporting Role
  - Best Performance by an Actress in a Supporting Role
  - Best Original Screenplay
