= Hot Dogs (film) =

1980 Canadian film

- French: Les Chiens chauds
- Directed by: Claude Fournier
- Written by: Claude Fournier
- Produced by: John Dunning; Marie-José Raymond
- Starring: Harry Reems; Geoffrey Bowes; Nicole Morin
- Cinematography: Claude Fournier
- Edited by: Claude Fournier; Marie-José Raymond
- Music by: Paul Baillargeon
- Production companies: DAL Productions; Rose Films; Squad Films
- Distributed by: Cinépix
- Release date: September 26, 1980
- Running time: 97 minutes
- Country: Canada
- Language: English

Hot Dogs (French: Les Chiens chauds) is a Canadian crime comedy/sexploitation film, directed by Claude Fournier and released in 1980. The film has been released under a variety of English titles, including Cops and Other Lovers, Under the Cover Cops and The Clean Up Squad, but has become best known as Hot Dogs.

The film stars Harry Reems as "Mr. Clean", the leader of a police vice squad who is determined to rid Montreal of prostitution, and Geoffrey Bowes as Maurice, a vice squad officer whose wife leaves him after discovering that his job involves dressing up as a woman to catch and arrest johns, who then decides to hire top local prostitute Estelle (Nicole Morin) to entrap Mr. Clean in a sex scandal in order to get him fired.

The cast also includes Daniel Pilon, Paul Berval, Greg Swanson, Fiona Reid, Gilles Latulippe, Ghyslain Tremblay, Jean Lapointe, Monique Lepage and Guy L'Écuyer.

== Critical response ==
Stephen Godfrey of The Globe and Mail panned the film, writing that "there'd be no point in talking about this embarrassment if it didn't bear the names of a number of talented Canadian actors, most notably Fiona Reid and Geoffrey Bowes, whose presence and performances in this film make one believe they need money very badly." He further opined that the dialogue was so bad that somebody ought to sue Fournier on behalf of the English language, but conversely praised Reems for giving a stronger performance than expected, writing that "when [Reems] encounters Miss Morin in the last part of the film and his facade begins to crumble, there are moments when he expresses the required vulnerability with real skill. Surprisingly, one almost begins to care about him. Given the idiocy that surrounds him, that is at least as awe-inspiring as anything else Reems may have shown on film in the past."

For Cinema Canada, Gary Evans wrote that "this nonsense does at least poke fun at the whole vice squad concept and the all-too-frequent entrapment techniques that police use to put pressure on prostitutes. Pity that Fournier and Raymond's screenplay missed the chance to comment on how vice squads seem to habitually rear their heads when city administrations wish to divert attention from municipal corruption."
