= Paul Larmand =

Canadian basketball player

Paul Larmand (born July 27, 1980 in Tiny Township, Ontario) is a Canadian basketball player who is a resident of Victoria Harbour, Ontario. He was a back-to-back CIS national champion in 2002-03 and 2003–04 with Carleton University. He ended up in seventh place with the Canada national men's basketball team at the 2007 Pan American Games in Rio de Janeiro, Brazil.

Larmand played as a guard in the South East Australian Basketball League (SEABL) for the 2005–06 season where his team were the regular season champions. He was runner-up for MVP honours in the SEABL in 2005–06.
