= Jacques Galipeau =

Canadian actor (1923–2020)

- Born: 22 September 1923; Montreal, Quebec, Canada
- Died: 30 August 2020 (aged 96)
- Occupation: Actor

Jacques Galipeau (22 September 1923 – 30 August 2020) was a Canadian actor.

== Filmography ==
- Beau temps, mauvais temps (1955)
- Le Survenant (1957)
- Marie-Didace (1958)
- Filles d'Ève (1960)
- Ti-Jean Caribou (1963)
- Le Paradis terrestre (1968)
- Les Belles Histoires des pays d'en haut (1969)
- Mont-Joye (1970)
- Le Temps des Lilas (1971)
- Tang (1971)
- Le Fils du ciel (1972)
- The Pyx (1973)
- La Petite Patrie (1974)
- Bingo (1974)
- Duplessis (1977)
- Le Clan Beaulieu (1978)
- It Can't Be Winter, We Haven't Had Summer Yet (Ça peut pas être l'hiver, on n'a même pas eu d'été) (1980)
- Laurier (1984)
- He Shoots, He Scores (1991)
- Marilyn (1991)
- Les Grands Procès (1993)
- Black List (1995)
- Set Me Free (1999)
- Chaos and Desire (2002)

== Theatre ==
- Les Fous de Dieu (1952)
