= Kerry DuWors =

Kerry DuWors (born September 26, 1980) is a Canadian violinist, chamber musician and educator.

Praised as a “dynamic performer” (Scott St. John) with “fearless competence” (Winnipeg Free Press), Kerry DuWors is the first prize winner of the 26th E-Gré National Music Competition and has been among the winners of the Canada Council’s Musical Instrument Bank Competition in 2009, 2006 and 2003. DuWors has collaborated with many acclaimed soloists and ensembles including James Ehnes, Yo-Yo Ma, Isabel Bayrakdarian, Dame Evelyn Glennie, Martin Fröst, Marc-André Hamelin, Andrew Dawes, Scott St. John, St. Lawrence and Penderecki Quartets, and the Gryphon Trio.

Recently, DuWors has performed as a soloist with the Winnipeg Symphony Orchestra (2009), Red Deer Symphony (2010), Manitoba Chamber Orchestra (2010) and Brandon Chamber Players (2011). In 2010–2011 she joined New York based The Knights for performances with Yo-Yo Ma and a tour of Germany with Jan Vogler. She also toured the US with the Galileo Piano Trio and held a residency at the Banff Center for the Arts while collaborating with pianist Futaba Niekawa.

DuWors began her musical training while growing up in Saskatoon, Saskatchewan. She furthered her studies at University of Victoria with Ann Elliot-Goldschmid (B.Mus.) of the Lafayette String Quartet; and University of Toronto under Lorand Fenyves (M.Mus.). While at University at Toronto she was awarded the Eaton Graduate Scholarship, the Yo-Yo Ma Fellowship for Strings and the Felix Galimir Award for Chamber Music Excellence. DuWors has been assistant professor of Violin and Chamber Music at Brandon University since 2003. In 2010 she began a Doctorate in Musical Arts at Eastman School of Music as a student of Charles Castleman.

== See also ==
- E-Gré National Music Competition: "Past Winners" Retrieved Jan. 28, 2012
- Canada Council for the Arts: "Cumulative List of Winners" Retrieved Jan. 28, 2012
- Brandon University: "Kerry DuWors" Retrieved Jan. 28,2012
- U of T Magazine: "Sonata of Success" Retrieved July 21, 2012
