= It Can't Be Winter, We Haven't Had Summer Yet =

- French: Ça peut pas être l'hiver, on n'a même pas eu d'été
- Directed by: Louise Carré
- Written by: Louise Carré
- Produced by: Louise Carré
- Starring: Charlotte Boisjoli; Jacques Galipeau; Céline Lomez
- Cinematography: Robert Vanherweghem
- Edited by: André Théberge
- Music by: Marc O'Farrell
- Production company: La Maison des Quatre
- Distributed by: J.-A. Lapointe Films
- Release date: June 19, 1980
- Running time: 87 minutes
- Country: Canada
- Language: French

It Can't Be Winter, We Haven't Had Summer Yet (French: Ça peut pas être l'hiver, on n'a même pas eu d'été) is a Canadian drama film, directed by Louise Carré and released in 1980. The film stars Charlotte Boisjoli as Adèle Marquis, a recently widowed woman in her 50s who is learning how to live for herself and her own needs after her husband's death.

The cast also includes Jacques Galipeau, Céline Lomez, Serge Bélair, Mireille Thibeault, Daniel Matte, Marie-Ève Doré, Anne-Marie Ducharme, Martin Neufeld, Peter Neufeld, Illia Esopos, Guillaume Tremblay, Isabelle Doré, Lucie Mitchell, Guy Bélanger, Hélène Grégoire, Louise Arbique, Jean Richard, Annick Chartier, Réal Côté, Félix Chartier, Wilner Boulin, Jean-Belzil Gascon, Claude Saint-Germain, Martin Lyons, Kathleen Butler, Marjorie Godin and Gaétane Laniel in supporting roles.

The film was screened at the 1980 Montreal World Film Festival, where it won the award for Best Canadian Film.
