= Zale Dalen =

Canadian film and television director

Zale Dalen was a Canadian film and television director. He is known for the 1980 film The Hounds of Notre Dame, for which he garnered a Genie Award nomination for Best Director at the 2nd Genie Awards in 1981, the cult films Skip Tracer (1977) and Terminal City Ricochet (1990).

== Career ==
His television credits included episodes of For the Record, The Edison Twins, Danger Bay, Airwolf, Wiseguy, The Beachcombers, Alfred Hitchcock Presents, 21 Jump Street, Kung Fu: The Legend Continues and Call of the Wild. In addition, he directed two made-for-TV movies: "Anything to Survive" (1990) for ABC and "On Thin Ice, the Tai Babalonia Story" (1990) for NBC.

His non-television work includes educational and sponsored films, plus the Saskatchewan Pavilion film for Expo '86.

== Later years ==
Dalen granted Jesse Savath, a son of the late writer/producer Phil Savath, an option that would allow a remake of his first feature film, Skip Tracer, which won an Etrog, the Wendy Michener award for emerging directors at the Canadian Film Awards in 1977. It was presented at the Montreal, Toronto, New York, London, Moscow, Thesolonika (Greece), and Sydney (Australia) film festivals.

Dalen died on September 25, 2024, survived by his by wife, three children and two grandchildren.
