= Suzanne (1980 film) =

- Directed by: Robin Spry
- Written by: Robin Spry; Ronald Sutherland
- Produced by: Robert Lantos
- Starring: Jennifer Dale; Gabriel Arcand; Winston Rekert
- Cinematography: Miklós Lente
- Distributed by: RSL Entertainment
- Release date: 1980
- Running time: 102 minutes
- Country: Canada
- Language: English

Suzanne is a 1980 Canadian drama film directed by Robin Spry. It was written by Spry and Ronald Sutherland as an adaptation of Sutherland's 1971 novel Snow Lark.

The film stars Jennifer Dale and also includes Gabriel Arcand, Winston Rekert, Ken Pogue, Michelle Rossignol, Michael Ironside, Aubert Pallascio, Pierre Curzi and Yvan Ducharme.

The film garnered six Genie Award nominations at the 2nd Genie Awards, including Best Actor (Rekert), Best Actress (Dale), Best Supporting Actor (Arcand), Best Adapted Screenplay, Best Cinematography and Best Costume Design.

== Plot ==
Suzanne McDonald is a woman in an unhappy marriage who becomes pregnant after an extramarital affair with a gangster who has just been sent to prison.

== Cast ==
- Jennifer Dale as Suzanne McDonald
- Gabriel Arcand as Georges Laflamme
- Ken Pogue as Andrew McDonald
- Michelle Rossignol as Yvette McDonald
- Gordon Thomson as Greg
- Michael Ironside as Jimmy
- Helen Hughes as Mrs. Callaghan
- Pierre Curzi as Pierre
- Yvan Ducharme as Eddy
- Marc Gélinas as Greasy Spoon Owner
- Aubert Pallascio as Detective
- Jean Archambault as East End Club Waiter
- Septimiu Sever as Abortionist
- Sylvie Boucher as Go Go Dancer
- Michele Scarabelli as Go Go Dancer
- Mireille Deyglun as Nurse
- Roy Witham as Rooming house landlord
- Manda Parent as Baby sitter
- Jean-Jacques Blanchet as Policeman
- Marcel Gauthier as Policeman
