= Tribute (1980 film) =

1980 film by Bob Clark

- Film poster
- Directed by: Bob Clark
- Screenplay by: Bernard Slade
- Based on: Tribute by Bernard Slade
- Produced by: Garth Drabinsky; Joel B. Michaels
- Starring: Jack Lemmon; Robby Benson; Lee Remick; John Marley; Kim Cattrall; Gale Garnett; Colleen Dewhurst
- Cinematography: Reginald H. Morris
- Edited by: Richard Halsey
- Music by: Kenneth Wannberg
- Production companies: Tiberius Films; The Turman-Foster Company
- Distributed by: 20th Century Fox
- Release date: December 15, 1980 (Canada)
- Running time: 124 minutes
- Country: Canada
- Language: English
- Budget: $8 million
- Box office: $9 million

Tribute is a 1980 Canadian comedy-drama film directed by Bob Clark and starring Jack Lemmon as Scottie Templeton, a terminally ill Broadway agent trying to make amends with his family and friends. Robby Benson and Lee Remick co-star, with supporting roles Colleen Dewhurst, John Marley, Kim Cattrall, and Gale Garnett. It is based on the play of the same name by Bernard Slade, who also wrote the screenplay.

The film was released in December 1980 to widespread critical acclaim. It was entered into the 31st Berlin International Film Festival where Jack Lemmon won the Silver Bear for Best Actor, and Clark was nominated for the Golden Bear.

Lemmon was also nominated for an Academy Award for Best Actor and a Golden Globe Award for Best Actor in a Motion Picture - Drama for his performance, and won the Genie Award for Best Performance by a Foreign Actor. The film was nominated for ten other Genie Awards, including Best Picture, Best Direction, Best Adapted Screenplay, and Best Score.

Barry Manilow sang the song "We Still Have Time (Theme from Tribute)" over the closing credits. Manilow, Bruce Sussman, and Jack Feldman composed the song, which appears on Manilow's 1980 album Barry.

== Plot ==
Scottie Templeton is a show-business veteran, based in New York and well known in the theatrical community there. He has many acquaintances, but is divorced from his wife Maggie Stratton and estranged from his only son Jud.

Scottie learns that he has leukemia and is dying. Maggie, in town for a school reunion, comes to visit and reflect on their time together. Scottie makes an effort to reconnect with Jud, who still has anger issues. A young model whom Scottie met in the hospital, Sally Haines, strikes Scottie as someone who might be a good romantic match for his son. As a testimonial dinner is organized in Scottie's honor, he attempts to repair some of his past relationships in the time he has left.

== Cast ==
- Jack Lemmon as Scottie Templeton
- Robby Benson as Jud Templeton
- Lee Remick as Maggie Stratton
- Colleen Dewhurst as Gladys Petrelli
- John Marley as Lou Daniels
- Kim Cattrall as Sally Haines
- Gale Garnett as Hilary
- Teri Keane as Evelyn
- Rummy Bishop as Poker Player
- John Dee as Poker Player
- Bob Windsor as Poker Player
- Eileen Lehman as Nurse
- Andrew Foot as Actor
- Trevor Daley as Cop

== Awards ==
It was entered into the 31st Berlin International Film Festival, where Jack Lemmon won the Silver Bear for Best Actor and Bob Clark was nominated for the Golden Bear. Lemmon was also nominated for a Golden Globe Award for Best Actor in a Motion Picture - Drama at the 38th Golden Globe Awards and an Academy Award for Best Actor at the 53rd Academy Awards for his performance. He won the Canadian Genie Award for Best Performance by a Foreign Actor. The film was also nominated for Best Motion Picture, Best Director, Best Supporting Actor (John Marley), Best Supporting Actress (Colleen Dewhurst and Gale Garnett), Best Foreign Actress (Lee Remick), Best Adapted Screenplay, Best Musical Score, Best Sound and Best Sound Editing at the 2nd Genie Awards.
