= Louise Carré =

Canadian film director and producer

Louise Carré (born February 1, 1936) is a Canadian film director and producer from Quebec, most noted for her 1980 film It Can't Be Winter, We Haven't Had Summer Yet (Ça peut pas être l'hiver, on n'a même pas eu d'été).

An administrator with the National Film Board of Canada in the 1970s, she began her active filmmaking career as a screenwriter on Anne Claire Poirier's 1975 film Before the Time Comes (Le Temps de l'avant). In 1978 she launched her own production company, La Maison des Quatre.

It Can't Be Winter, about a woman learning to become more independent after the death of her husband, won the award for Best Canadian Film at the 1980 Montreal World Film Festival. She subsequently served for several years as director of the Rendez-vous du cinéma québécois.

Carré followed up in 1986 with A Question of Loving (Qui a tiré sur nos histoires d'amour?), but concentrated principally on producing, most notably on Mireille Dansereau's 1987 film Deaf to the City (Un sourd dans la ville), until returning to directing with the 1997 documentary film My Heart Is My Witness (Mon cœur est témoin).
