= Sophie Bissonnette =

Canadian film director

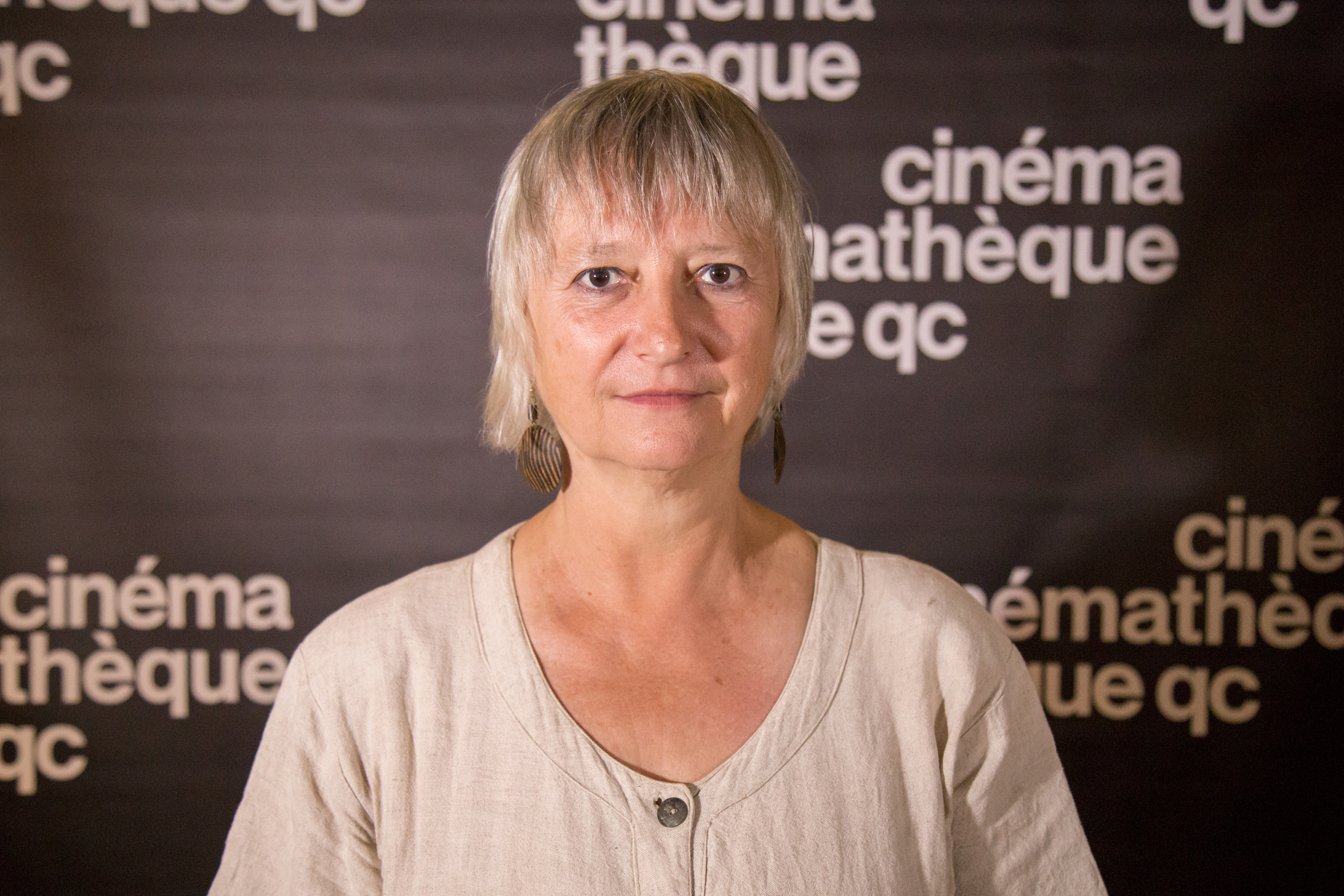
- Born: September 18, 1956 (age 69); Montreal, Quebec, Canada
- Occupation: Filmmaker
- Known for: A Wives' Tale, L'amour... a quel prix?, Quel Numero?

Sophie Bissonnette (born September 18, 1956) is a Canadian filmmaker and producer. After graduating from Queen's University, she began making films in Montreal and released most of her documentary films in the 1980s. In these films, Bissonnette illustrated social and political justices, both of which were topics that were covered commonly by many Quebecois filmmakers. However, her films were distinguishable through exploring the women's perspective of male-dominated social engagements and incidents in French Canada.

Bissonnette has directed, co-produced, and written over 10 documentaries and short films. She is mostly known for A Wives' Tale (Une histoire de femmes), L'amour... a quel prix?, and Quel Numero?, all of which have received awards from film festivals.

She has also received multiple awards for her work, such as Quebec Critics' prize for best film of the year. Beyond filmmaking, Bissonnette helped promote feminist and Quebecois films through being involved with film organizations, like the Association des Réalisateurs et Réalisatrices de films du Québec Inc. (ARRFQ) and Les Rencontres internationales du documentaire de Montréal.

== Early life and education ==
Sophie Bissonnette was born on September 18, 1956, in Montreal, Quebec. She was originally raised in Ottawa. She majored in film and sociology at Queen's University, Kingston. She graduated with a Bachelor of Arts in 1978. After receiving her degree, Bissonnette moved and settled back to her birthplace, Montreal, in which she co-directed her first documentary film in 1980.

== Career ==
When Bissonnette moved to Montreal in 1978, she began her career as a researcher, producer, writer, teacher, and director. In the 1980s, many Quebecois filmmakers were interested in covering social and political engagements, since this topic lacked proper attention in the past. Therefore, Bissonnette wrote, directed, and produced various documentaries and short films about this theme. What distinguished her work from covering male-oriented issues is revealing the women's side of the story. She conveyed the perspectives and struggles of the female gender behind the scenes of these social and political injustices. Bissonnette co-produced her first documentary film, Une Histoire de Femmes, in 1980. This film illustrated the marital and social struggles of the wives of miners on a strike against the International Nickel Company of Ontario (INCO), now known as Vale Limited. The film showed the wives' conflicts with their husbands, as well as their struggle against the company's powers that were enforced over their daily lives. In an interview, Bissonnette said that she was involved in the feminist and the labor movement when she made this film. She also said that she wanted to shed the light on women of the working force and the housewives.

She explored the feminist perspective of housewives and women in the work force, such as Quel numero?, L'amour... a quel prix?, and Des lumières dans la grande noirceur.

Bissonnette struggled to fund her films. She then became involved with the Association des Réalisateurs et Réalisatrices de films du Québec Inc. (ARRFQ), in which she promoted the work of feminist activists. She also worked in the distribution center of Cine Libre, an independent film distributor that no longer exists. She is also one of the founding members of a Montreal film festival known as Les Rencontres internationales du documentaire de Montréal.

== Filmography ==
- 1980: A Wives' Tale (Une histoire de femmes)
- 1985: Quel Numero?
- 1988: L'amour... à quel prix ?
- 1991: Des lumières dans la grande noirceur
- 1992: Le plafond de verre
- 1996: 49, a Breath of Rage
- 1997: Près de nous
- 2001: Partition pour voix de femmes
- 2002: Madeleine Parent
- 2007: Sexy inc. Nos enfants sous influence
- 2012: Les dames aux caméras

== Awards and nominations ==
- 1980: Winner of Quebec Critics' prize for the year's best film, Une histoire de femmes.
- 2008: Canada YWCA Advocacy Award for Sexy inc. Nos enfants sous influence
- 2008: UNICEF Prize at the Japan Contest Prize for Sexy inc. Nos enfants sous influence
- 2008: Finalist of the Beyond Borders Media Awards for Sexy inc. Nos enfants sous influence
- 2002: Gemini Awards Finalist "Best Documentary" for Partition pour voix de femmes
- 1997: Video Award Intervention 1997 / Series (OCS) for '49 - a Breath of Rage
- 1992: Cinema Award from the Office of Social Communications for Des lumières dans la grande noirceur
- 1992: Price Martini Sequences for Des lumières dans la grande noirceur
- 1992: Honorable Mention at the San Francisco Golden Gate Awards for Des lumières dans la grande noirceur
- 1985: Nominated for the Quebec Critics' Best Feature Award for Quel Numero?
- 1980: Quebec Critics' Best Feature Film Award for A Story of Women

== Sources ==
- http://www.wmm.com/filmcatalog/makers/fm828.shtml
- Alioff, Maurie. "Bissonnette, Sophie." The Canadian Encyclopedia. Accessed January 29, 2018. https://www.encyclopediecanadienne.ca/fr/article/bissonnette- sophie/#h3_jump_0
- Coulombe, Michel, and Marcel Jean. Dictionnaire du cinéma québécois. 4th ed. Montréal: Boreal, 2006.
- Pallister, Janis L., and Ruth A Hottell. French-speaking Women Documentarians: A Guide. Vol. 47. Francophone cultures and literatures. Peter Lang, 2005.
- Pallister, Janis L. Cinema of quebec: masters in their own house. Fairleigh Dickinson Up, 1996.
- Hohl, J. & Huston, L. (1981). Une histoire de femmes : Entrevue avec Sophie Bissonnette. International Review of Community Development (1981)
- https://www.erudit.org/en/journals/riac/1981-n6-riac02338/1034961ar.pdf
