= Good Riddance (film) =

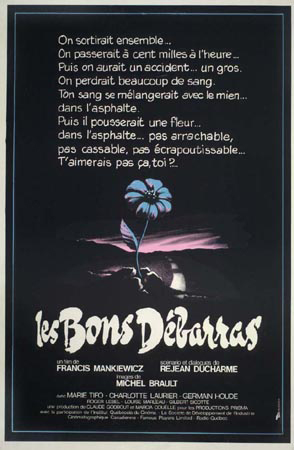
- Film poster
- Directed by: Francis Mankiewicz
- Written by: Réjean Ducharme
- Produced by: Marcia Couëlle; Claude Godbout
- Starring: Charlotte Laurier; Marie Tifo; Germain Houde
- Cinematography: Michel Brault
- Edited by: André Corriveau
- Music by: Bernard Buisson
- Production company: Productions Prisma
- Distributed by: Pan-Canadian Film Distributors
- Release date: 29 February 1980
- Running time: 120 minutes
- Country: Canada
- Language: French
- Budget: CAD 600,000

Good Riddance (French: Les Bons débarras) is a 1980 French-language Canadian drama film. Directed by Francis Mankiewicz and written by Réjean Ducharme, the film concerns Manon (Charlotte Laurier), an unstable young girl who lives with her mother Michelle (Marie Tifo) and her alcoholic and intellectually disabled uncle Ti-Guy (Germain Houde).

Starting as the first screenplay by the novelist Ducharme, the film was shot by Mankiewicz and cinematographer Michel Brault on a low budget. It debuted at the Berlin International Film Festival and won several Genie Awards, including Best Motion Picture. It was established as a classic Canadian film, with the Toronto International Film Festival repeatedly placing it in the Top 10 Canadian Films of All Time. The film was selected as the Canadian entry for the Best Foreign Language Film at the 53rd Academy Awards, but was not accepted as a nominee.

== Plot ==
Manon is a precocious 13-year-old girl living with her mother Michelle and intellectually challenged uncle Ti-Guy in the Laurentides. Manon wants to quit school and obtain the true love of her mother, whom she accuses of not loving her. Michelle is pregnant with the child of Maurice, a police officer who tries to convince her to give up caring for Ti-Guy, by placing him in an institution. Ti-Guy is frequently stealing from Michelle, drinking excessively, driving dangerously and stalking the family's wealthy female neighbour. Maurice also pressures Michelle to get an abortion. Michelle is determined to have the child, and insistent on keeping Ti-Guy with her.

Manon strongly dislikes Ti-Guy for his misbehavior and Maurice for being a cop, and when Michelle tells Manon of her pregnancy, Manon becomes upset. Manon prefers Gaetan, Michelle's former lover who gives her marijuana, and also steals the book Wuthering Heights from their neighbour and starts reading it.

On her birthday, Manon runs away for a time and phones her mother asking for her exclusive love, which Michelle takes as hurtful. After Manon comes back, she tells Michelle that Maurice molested her, at which point Michelle angrily chases Maurice away. Michelle consequently begins dining with Gaetan and Manon, with Manon promising to no longer hurt her. Confronting Ti-Guy in his vehicle, Manon screams at him and convinces him to commit suicide by crashing the vehicle. While sleeping with her mother, Manon receives Maurice's call about the death, but shields Michelle from the news.

== Cast ==
- Charlotte Laurier - Manon
- Marie Tifo - Michelle
- Germain Houde - Ti-Guy
- Louise Marleau - Mrs. Viau-Vachon
- Roger Lebel - Maurice
- Gilbert Sicotte - Gaetan
- Serge Thériault - Lucien
- Jean-Pierre Bergeron - Fernand
- Leo Ilial - Samaritain
- Madeleine Chartrand - Girl at the bar
- Louise Rinfret - Girl at the bar

== Themes ==
There have been numerous interpretations of the film. Critic Ian Lockerbie suggested the film is an allegory for Quebec nationhood in the aftermath of the 1980 Quebec referendum, substituting nationalism for victimization. However, author Peter Morris replies English Canadian films were exploring similar themes at the time and that Les bons débarras was made before the referendum. Author Chris Gittings observes interpretations of Les bons débarras as symbolism of Quebec as being a victim of English Canada, and writes that the film depicts class inequality in Quebec society, given the impoverished state of Michelle's family.

Author Janis L. Pallister argues the film fits in Québécois cinema as introspective, and that it is about desire and envy and is in part psychological horror and political symbolism. Professor Claire Portelance, writing for Le Devoir, suggested the impoverished state of the family indicated the film's message was that the Quiet Revolution did not improve the lives of Quebeckers, and that many things still looked like the past.

== Production ==
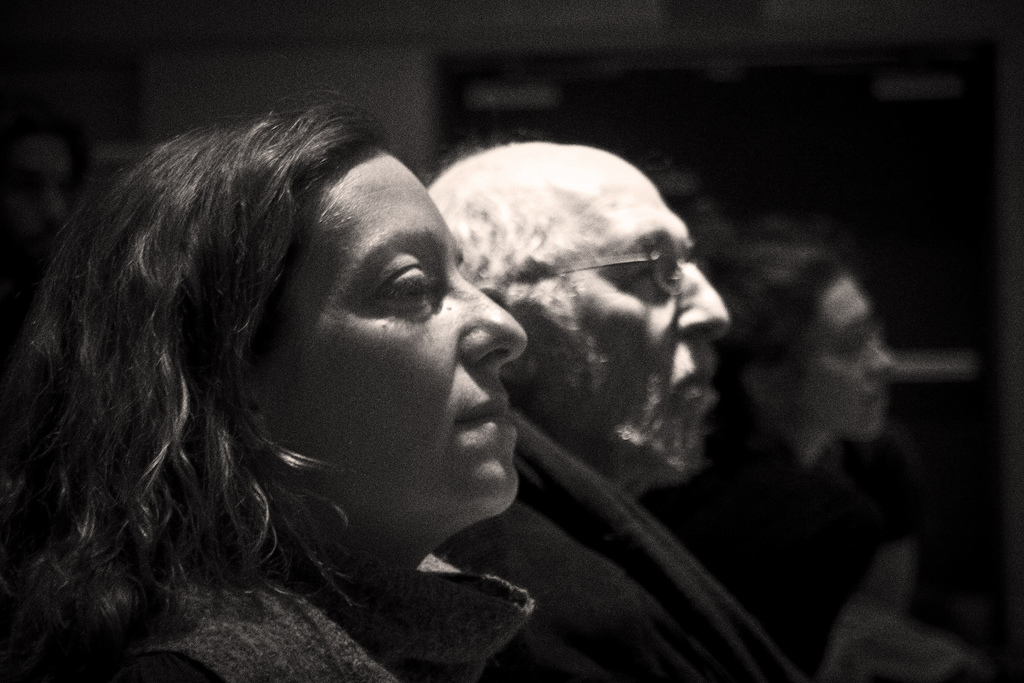
Michel Brault, right, shot the film and won the Genie Award for Best Cinematography.

The screenplay was written by Quebecois novelist Réjean Ducharme, marking his first attempt at writing a film. It was shot by Francis Mankiewicz at an inexpensive cost of about $600,000 in a "Gothic" style creating "a sense of the menace of evil." Mankiewicz had selected Michel Brault as his cinematographer, aiming for a textured look without high contrasts. They also took inspiration from the paintings of Edward Hopper. Filming took place in 1979.

In 1981, Mankiewicz said the character of Manon symbolizes a romantic outlook, whereas Michelle was more realistic. "Manon is the filmmaker and Michelle is the everyday person in me. I am a dreamer," he said. The film was produced by Productions Prisma, based in Montreal.

== Release ==
The film was first screened in the 30th Berlin International Film Festival in 1980. It subsequently had a release in France. As the film is in Canadian French, a survey found 48% of viewers in France had difficulty understanding it. It opened in Kentucky in October 1981. Les bons débarras was seen by more people than any French Canadian film since Mon oncle Antoine (1971), but it was later eclipsed by Denys Arcand's The Decline of the American Empire (1986) and Jesus of Montreal (1989).

In 2013, the film was given a 4K resolution restoration by the Elephant project and Quebecor and screened at the Lumière Film Festival in Lyon, France, on 14 October 2014. The Elephant restoration subsequently screened in the classics section of the Karlovy Vary International Film Festival in the Czech Republic in July 2015.

== Reception ==
=== Critical response ===
Good Riddance is widely considered one of the classic films in both Quebec and Canadian cinema. Don Haig of the National Film Board of Canada said it was considered "one of the great Quebecois films of all time." The Toronto International Film Festival ranked it in the Top 10 Canadian Films of All Time three times, in 1984, 1993 and 2004. In 1998, Take One named it as one of the 20 best Canadian films, writing "the kid is a dangerously compelling seductress who wreaks havoc out of a need to control those she loves." It was selected for preservation in 2006 by the Audio-Visual Preservation Trust of Canada, a charitable non-profit organization dedicated to promoting the preservation of Canada’s audio-visual heritage. In 2015, La Presse columnist Marc Cassivi named it one of Quebec's best films, saying Mankiewicz's intimate direction and Ducharme's poetic writing blended particularly well, citing Manon's speech about a flower growing out of her and her mother's blood.

The film received less favourable reviews in the United States. The New York Times called the film "a meandering movie with a curious kind of staying power." The Chicago Reader wrote "Mankiewicz possesses a dark, provocative sensibility, yet he isn't sufficiently in control of his medium to produce a coherent work out of his conflicting moods." Conversely, David Denby of New York wrote the Manon character was "a little monster" but heart-breaking, and that Jean Cocteau would have admired the film. William Mootz of The Courier-Journal in Louisville, Kentucky wrote the film "has obviously been much admired in Canada, and with good reasons. It is a beautifully acted movie, filmed with an almost painful sincerity under the direction of Francis Mankiewicz."

=== Accolades ===
The film won the Genie Award for Best Canadian Film, along with seven other Genies, including for best original screenplay. It was selected as the Canadian entry for the Best Foreign Language Film at the 53rd Academy Awards, but was not accepted as a nominee.

Award	Date of ceremony	Category	Recipient(s)	Result	Ref(s)
Genie Awards	March 12, 1981	Best Motion Picture	Claude Godbout and Marcia Couelle	Won	
Genie Awards	March 12, 1981	Best Direction	Francis Mankiewicz	Won	
Genie Awards	March 12, 1981	Best Actress	Marie Tifo	Won	
Genie Awards	March 12, 1981	Best Actress	Charlotte Laurier	Nominated	
Genie Awards	March 12, 1981	Best Supporting Actor	Germain Houde	Won	
Genie Awards	March 12, 1981	Best Original Screenplay	Réjean Ducharme	Won	
Genie Awards	March 12, 1981	Best Art Direction	Michel Proulx	Nominated	
Genie Awards	March 12, 1981	Best Cinematography	Michel Brault	Won	
Genie Awards	March 12, 1981	Best Costume Design	Diane Paquet	Nominated	
Genie Awards	March 12, 1981	Best Editing	André Corriveau	Won	
Genie Awards	March 12, 1981	Best Sound	Henri Blondeau and Michel Descombes	Won	

== See also ==
- List of submissions to the 53rd Academy Awards for Best Foreign Language Film
- List of Canadian submissions for the Academy Award for Best Foreign Language Film
