= A Wives' Tale =

- French: Une histoire de femmes
- Directed by: Sophie Bissonnette; Martin Duckworth; Joyce Rock
- Produced by: Arthur Lamothe
- Cinematography: Martin Duckworth; Leonard Gilday; Jean-Charles Tremblay
- Edited by: Michel Arcand; Sophie Bissonnette
- Music by: Rachel Paiement; André Paiement; David Burt
- Production company: Les Ateliers Audio-visuels du Québec
- Release date: 1980
- Running time: 72 minutes
- Country: Canada
- Languages: English; French

A Wives' Tale (French: Une histoire de femmes) is a Canadian documentary film, directed by Sophie Bissonnette, Martin Duckworth and Joyce Rock and released in 1980. The film explores the role of women in the community during the 1978 Inco strike, when a nine-month strike at INCO's mining operations in Sudbury, Ontario decimated the local economy.

The film won the Prix de la critique québécoise from the Association québécoise des critiques de cinéma in 1981, although the filmmakers did not receive the traditional prize money as the Quebec Film Institute had opted to discontinue funding the award without informing the AQCC. The film was also a Genie Award nominee for Best Theatrical Documentary at the 2nd Genie Awards in 1981.
