= Scott Hylands =

Canadian actor (1943–2026)

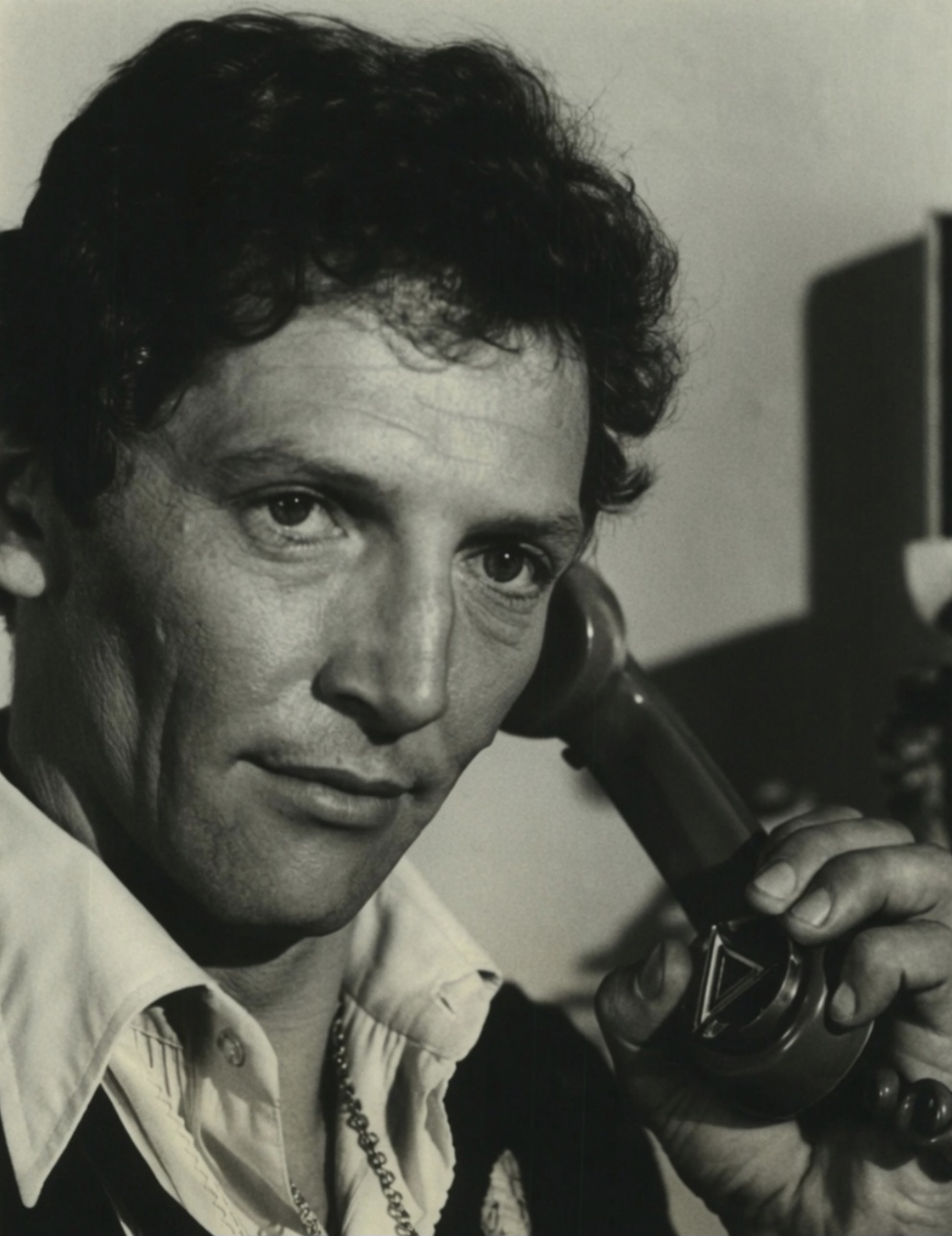
- Hylands in 1977
- Born: Scott Hylands Douglas; 27 February 1943; Lethbridge, Alberta, Canada
- Died: 29 July 2026 (aged 83); Victoria, British Columbia, Canada
- Occupation: Actor
- Years active: 1965–2020
- Spouse: Veronica Hylands
- Children: 2

Scott Hylands Douglas (27 February 1943 – 29 July 2026) was a Canadian actor who appeared in film, television, and on stage. Due to his longevity and versatility, critics have called him "one of Canada's greatest actors."

== Early years ==
Scott Hylands Douglas was born in 1943 in Lethbridge, Alberta. His mother, Ruth (née White) Douglas (1913–2005), was a public health nurse, later a mathematics teacher, and his father, Walter Norman Douglas, was killed in action in 1945, during World War II. He was raised and educated in southwest British Columbia, where he attended Shawnigan Lake Boys School on Vancouver Island. He then attended the University of British Columbia in Vancouver and graduated in 1964. Hylands initially studied zoology, but when the university began a theater arts major, he transferred into that program.

Upon graduation, he left Canada to pursue an acting career in New York City, where his first role was as the lead in an off-Broadway production of the comedy Billy Liar.

== Career in the United States ==
After appearing on Billy Liar in 1965, he spent several years in San Francisco, acting with the American Conservatory Theater. Then, in 1968, he was asked by Canadian-American Hollywood film director Mark Robson to audition for a movie role. His first film appearance was in the 1969 suspense film Daddy's Gone A-Hunting. His performance received positive reviews, but his film debut was overshadowed by another film released at the same time, Midnight Cowboy.

In August 1975, Hylands appeared onstage as Mercutio in the Los Angeles Free Shakespeare Society production of Romeo and Juliet at the John Anson Ford Theater, known at the time as The Pilgrimage Theatre, in the Cahuenga Pass. He received critical praise, both for his acting skill and for his good looks.

While he did not become a household name, he worked regularly, appearing in a number of movies, as well as in some American television shows. Among the television shows in which he acted were Cannon, The Waltons, Kung Fu, Baretta, and Ironside.

On American television, he became well known for playing tough guy characters and villains: as he noted in an interview, if an actor was not the leading man, he generally plays a "heavy."

== Career in Canada ==
In 1980, Hylands, while still living in California, was cast in Canada's Norfolk television production of Jack London's Tales of the Klondike in the one hour episode In A Far Country playing the lead opposite Robert Carradine and filmed in Canada (produced in Toronto; it aired in 1981 on CBC, Channel 4 [UK], and German, French and Italian television). This was the beginning of his Canadian career and he played leading roles at the Stratford Festival afterwards in 1981-1982 season and this occasioned his return to work and live in Canada. He was subsequently cast as Detective Kevin "O.B." O'Brien on the television series Night Heat, a police drama, produced in Toronto; it aired in both Canada on CTV and America on CBS from 1985 to 1989. This was his first recurring television starring role.

After Night Heat was canceled, Hylands continued to live in Canada, settling in Salt Spring Island, where he lived for 25 years with his wife, Veronica, a nurse, and their two children. They later relocated to Victoria. He worked in both American and Canadian productions. He appeared as Father Travis in the ABC series V.

Hylands appeared on numerous other programs, including the 1992 television film To Catch a Killer, a 1995 episode of the police drama NYPD Blue, and on four episodes of the revival of The Outer Limits from 1996 to 2001. He also returned to the Canadian stage, playing leading roles in such productions as Waiting for Godot (2015), and The Tempest (1994), among others. He produced and directed a 2008 version of Waiting for Godot and performed in a solo version of A Christmas Carol. In addition, Hylands directed and performed in a 2006 production of Under Milk Wood that was staged in Victoria BC.

In 2021, at age 78, Hylands expressed no interest in retiring and continued to be involved with theater until sidelined by health issues.

== Health and death ==
In 2021, shortly after his daughter's wedding, Hylands was diagnosed with acute myeloid leukemia. A GoFundMe account was posted by his wife to help pay for the well-regarded but expensive medication, Venclexta, needed for Hylands' chemotherapy treatment.

Hylands died from complications of acute myeloid leukemia after five years of remission, on 29 July 2026, at the age of 83. His death was publicly announced by his son.

== Filmography ==
=== Film ===
- Daddy's Gone A-Hunting (1969) – Kenneth Daly
- Operation Snafu (1970) – Reginald Wollington
- Fools (1970) – David Appleton
- Slipstream (1973) – Terry
- The Visitor (1974)
- Earthquake (1974) – Asst. Caretaker – Hollywood Reservoir Dam
- Bittersweet Love (1976) – Michael Lewis
- The Boys in Company "C" (1978) – Capt. Collins
- Coming Out Alive (1980) – Jocko
- Death Hunt (1981) – The Pilot
- Isaac Littlefeathers (1984) – Jesse Armstrong
- The Oasis (1984) – Jake
- Decoy (1996) – Jenner
- Ignition (2001) – Carlsen
- Freezer Burn: The Invasion of Laxdale (2008) – Arnie Filmore
- Beyond the Black Rainbow (2010) – Dr. Mercurio Arboria
- Knockout (2011) – Grandfather Charlie Putman
- Becoming Redwood (2012) – Earl
- Rememory (2017) – Charles
- Norman (2019, Short film) – Norman
- Elsewhere (2019) – Mr. Black

=== Television ===
Scott Hylands television credits
Year	Title	Role	Notes
1971	Earth II	Jim Capa	Television film
1972	The Sixth Sense	Jason	1 episode
1972–1974	Ironside	Joe Grainger / Philip Thomas	2 episodes
1973	Griff	Assassin	1 episode
1973	Kung Fu	Randy Bucknell / Saunders	2 episodes
1974	The Magician	Hal	1 episode
1975	Harry O	Luke Turner	1 episode
1976	Cannon	Joe Gantry	2 episodes
1976	Baretta	Hatfield	1 episode
1977	Wonder Woman	Paul Bjornsen	2 episodes
1977	Baa Baa Black Sheep	Padre John	1 episode
1977	Police Story	Lt. Carl Inforzato	2 episodes
1978	The Winds of Kitty Hawk	Glenn Curtiss	Television film
1978	Centennial	Laseter	Miniseries
1980	Jack London's Tales of the Klondike	Carter Weatherbe	1 episode
1981	The Waltons	Curt Willard Packard	1 episode
1982	Hart to Hart	Alan Chambers	1 episode
1982	Shocktrauma	Dr. "Tex" Goodnight	Television film
1984	George Washington	General Greene	Miniseries
1984	Blue Thunder	Peter Anson	1 episode
1985–1989	Night Heat	Detective Kevin O'Brien	96 episodes
1991	Counterstrike	Colonel Nathan	Episode: "The Dilemma"
1992	To Catch a Killer	Delta Squad Sergeant Mike Paxton	Television film
1993	Ordeal in the Arctic	Fred Ritchie	Television film
1993	Scales of Justice	Harry Oakes	Episode: "Rex v De Marigny"
1993	Kung Fu: The Legend Continues	Gant	1 episode
1995	Falling from the Sky: Flight 174	First Officer Maurice Quintal	Television film
1995	NYPD Blue	Roy Sandquist	1 episode
1996	Titanic	John Jacob Astor IV	Miniseries
1996–2001	The Outer Limits	Various characters	4 episodes
1997	The X-Files	Gen. Benjamin Bloch	1 episode
1998	Stargate SG-1	Dr. Timothy Harlow	1 episode
2007	Anna's Storm	Clint Corbin	Television film
2007	Eureka	Pierre Sandrov	1 episode
2009	V	Father Tarvis	11 episodes
2011	Supernatural	Judge Tye Mortimer	1 episode
2012	The Horses of McBride	Preston	Television film
2017	Fargo	Ennis Stussy	3 episodes
2019	Heartland	Lucky Butch Connelly	1 episode
2020	Wynonna Earp	Wyatt Earp	1 episode
