= The Strongest Man in the World (1980 film) =

- Directed by: Halya Kuchmij
- Written by: Robert A. Duncan
- Narrated by: Jack Palance
- Production company: Kino Films
- Release date: 1980
- Country: Canada

The Strongest Man in the World is a Canadian short documentary film, directed by Halya Kuchmij and released in 1980.

The film is a portrait of Mike Swistun, a circus performer from Manitoba who was billed as "The Strongest Man in the World" when he toured with Ringling Bros. and Barnum & Bailey Circus in the 1920s; after an injury ended his career in 1930, he returned to the town of Olha where his work included stints as a folk musician, a designer of Ukrainian Orthodox churches, and a chicken farmer.

The film won the Genie Award for Best Theatrical Short Film at the 2nd Genie Awards in 1981.
