= Germain Houde =

Canadian actor

Germain Houde (born December 14, 1952) is a Genie Award-winning Canadian actor from Petit-Saguenay, Quebec. He has usually played tough-guy parts; his screen characters have ranged from cruel criminals to corrupt policemen.

A graduate of the Conservatoire d’Art Dramatique de Québec, Houde spent his early years in theatre including time with an experimental troupe in England. His first cinematic role was in Anne Claire Poirier’s acclaimed A Scream from Silence (Mourir à tue-tête), where he played a vicious rapist. He has won two Genie Award for Best Performance by an Actor in a Supporting Role for his roles in Good Riddance (Les bons débarras) and Night Zoo (Un Zoo la nuit).

His other roles have included the television series En résidence, Omerta, Les Filles de Caleb, Les Invincibles and Vertige, and the films Prettykill, Love Me (Love-moi), Terminal City Ricochet, Léolo, Jerome's Secret, Fear of Water (La Peur de l'eau) and 2 Frogs in the West.
