= Middle Age Crazy =

1980 film by John Trent

- Theatrical release poster
- Directed by: John Trent
- Screenplay by: Carl Kleinschmitt; Jerry Lee Lewis
- Produced by: Ronald Cooper; Ronald Cohen; Sid & Marty Krofft
- Starring: Bruce Dern; Ann-Margret
- Cinematography: Reginald H. Morris
- Edited by: John Kelly
- Music by: Matthew McCauley
- Production companies: Canadian Film Development Corporation; Guardian Trust Company; Krofft Entertainment; Tormont Films
- Distributed by: 20th Century Fox
- Release date: July 25, 1980
- Running time: 95 minutes
- Countries: United States; Canada
- Language: English
- Budget: $5.1 million
- Box office: $13 million (domestic)

Middle Age Crazy is a 1980 comedy film directed by John Trent and starring Bruce Dern and Ann-Margret. This film received mixed reviews from critics and it was nominated for two awards, Worst Director and Worst Screenplay, at the 1st Golden Raspberry Awards.

== Plot ==
Bobby Lee Burnett lives a simple suburban life with his wife, Sue-Ann, whose efforts to please him include having orgasms that end with her saying: "Bingo." After she throws a party for his 40th birthday, Bobby undergoes a serious mid-life crisis. He changes his wardrobe, buys a car and begins an affair with another woman Nancy Henerson. Sue tolerates it for a while and gets her own fling. However, Bobby returns home and thanks Sue for everything.

== Cast ==
- Bruce Dern as Bobby Lee Burnett
- Ann-Margret as Sue Ann Burnett
- Graham Jarvis as J.D.
- Deborah Wakeham as Nancy Henerson
- Eric Christmas as Tom Burnett
- Helen Hughes as Ruth Burnett
- Geoffrey Bowes as Greg Burnett
- Michael Kane as Abe Titus
- Diane Dewey as Wanda Jean
- Vivian Reis as Becky
- Patricia Hamilton as Barbara Pickett
- Anni Lantuch as Janet
- Gina Dick as Linda McAllister
- Thomas Baird as Porsche Salesman
- Norma Dell'Agnese as Valedictorian
- Shirley Soloman as Condo Saleswoman
- Elias Zarou as Priest
- Michele Chiponski as Topless Dancer
- Jack Mather as Minister
- Jim Montgomery as Nancy's Boyfriend
- John Facenda as Sportscaster
