= Charlotte Laurier =

Canadian actress

- Born: November 18, 1966 (age 59)
- Occupation: actress
- Known for: Good Riddance (Les Bons débarras), The Dame in Colour (La Dame en couleurs), 2 Seconds (2 secondes)

Charlotte Laurier (born November 18, 1966) is a Canadian film and television actress. First prominent as a child actress in the 1980s, she is a two-time Genie Award nominee for Best Actress, in 1981 for Good Riddance (Les Bons débarras) and in 1986 for The Dame in Colour (La Dame en couleurs).

Her other film roles have included The Tin Flute (Bonheur d'occasion), Justine's Film (Le film de Justine), The Party (Le Party), An Imaginary Tale (Une histoire inventée), Agnes of God, The Revolving Doors (Les Portes tournantes), Heads or Tails (J'en suis!), Montreal Stories (Montréal vu par...) and 2 Seconds (2 secondes). Her television credits have included Scoop, Jasmine, Les intrépides and The Mills of Power (Les Tisserands du pouvoir).
