= Ken Mitchell =

Canadian academic, playwright and novelist (1940–2026)

- Born: Kenneth Ronald Mitchell; December 13, 1940; Moose Jaw, Saskatchewan, Canada
- Died: August 5, 2026 (aged 85)
- Occupations: Academic, playwright, novelist, poet
- Spouse: Jeanne

Kenneth Ronald Mitchell (December 13, 1940 – August 5, 2026) was a Canadian poet, novelist, and playwright. He had a notable influence in promoting Canadian literature; he took part in the founding of the Saskatchewan Writers' Guild (1969), and the Saskatchewan Playwrights Center (1982).

Mitchell was well known for his literary works depicting prairie culture. One of his most popular works Cruel Tears is "a deliberate rewriting of the story of Othello in a Prairie context." Produced in 1974, the musical incorporates country music into its production. Although it was met with both praise and criticism from Mitchell's peers, Cruel Tears has seen success in Canada, England and the United States.

== Early life ==
Ken Mitchell was the oldest of ten siblings, raised on his parents' livestock farm in rural Saskatchewan. His parents come from Irish and Scottish descent, and on both sides his family are "farm people from the hills south of Moose Jaw." Influenced by both his mother and aunt, Mitchell took an interest in literature at a young age. By age twelve, Mitchell was reading works by Giovanni Boccaccio, Joseph Conrad and Charles Dickens. Although he grew up on a farm, Mitchell got a taste for city living through attending school in Moose Jaw, which "prompted [him] to pursue an intellectual life."

Mitchell began his post-secondary education as a journalism student at Ryerson Institute of Technology, Toronto, Ontario. He later attended the University of Saskatchewan, where he received his MA in English. While attending university, Mitchell wrote both short stories and plays for the Canadian Broadcasting Corporation. After graduating in 1967, Mitchell joined the University of Saskatchewan's faculty, where he began teaching in the English department.

== Critical response ==
Mitchell received praise for his contribution to Canadian culture through his literature. Reviews of Mitchell's work often speak to his use and interest in "old-time masculinity" as a common theme. The protagonists of his literary works are commonly a mixture of rebel and hero, who are "famously tough, bad-tempered and competent." Mitchell was known as an "ardent supporter of prairie culture", with many of his works depicting rural prairie Canadian living. Mitchell believed in the strength of "regional writing" and has been quoted to say, "growing up in the Prairies and gaining a perception of the world through this particular landscape has been very important to my development as a writer." He remained a self-proclaimed advocate for Canadian literature, and was an active supporter of Canadian works being exposed in other countries.

== Later life and death ==
Mitchell retired from the English Department at the University of Regina, but continued to write and toured as a cowboy poet. He died on August 5, 2026, at the age of 85.

== Awards ==
In September 1999, Mitchell was inducted into the Order of Canada. In 2001 he was presented with the Saskatchewan Order of Merit.

== Works ==
=== Stage plays ===
- All Our Yesterdays (Musical, with Douglas Hicton. First prod. 1986)
- Cruel Tears (Folk opera, with Humphrey & the Dumptrucks. First prod. 1975)
- Davin:The Politician (First prod. 1978)
- Genesis (First Prod. 1975)
- The Great Cultural Revolution (First prod. 1981)
- Heroes (First prod. 1972)
- Little Nooton (First prod. 1979)
- Pleasant Street (First prod. 1972)
- The Medicine Line (First prod. 1976)
- The Shipbuilder (First prod. 1978)
- Showdown at Sand Valley (First prod. 1975)
- Sarah Binks, the Sweet Songstress of Saskatchewan (Musical, with Douglas Hicton and Paul Hiebert. First prod. 2001)
- This Train (First prod. 1973)

=== Books ===
- Alternative 3 (2003)
- Gone the Burning Sun (1985)
- Farewell Old Chums (1988)
- The Heroic Adventures of Donny Coyote (2003)
- Imaging for Students (1996)
- Proverbs for the Initiated (1999)
- Stones of the Dalai Lama (1993)
- Through the Nan Da Gate (1986)
- Witches and Idiots (1990)
- Rebels in Time: 3 Plays (1996)
- Wandering Rafferty (1972)
