= Francis Mankiewicz =

Canadian filmmaker

- Born: March 15, 1944; Shanghai, China
- Died: August 14, 1993 (aged 49); Montreal, Quebec, Canada
- Occupations: Film director Screenwriter; Film producer
- Years active: 1972–1991

Francis Mankiewicz (March 15, 1944 in Shanghai, China – August 14, 1993 in Montreal, Quebec, Canada) was a Canadian film director, screenwriter and producer. In 1945, his family moved to Montreal, where Francis spent all his childhood. His father was a second cousin to the famous Hollywood brothers, Joseph L. Mankiewicz and Herman J. Mankiewicz.

== Career ==
Francis Mankiewicz studied geology at McGill University and University of Montreal, and in 1966, travelled to London, England, to study filmmaking. He returned to Montreal in 1968 and assisted on several sponsored films before directing his first feature in 1972. His debut was Le temps d'une chasse, which was followed by the dysfunctional family drama Les Bons Débarras, generally regarded as his best film. He won Best Director at the Genie Awards, and the film was nominated for the Golden Bear at the Berlin Film Festival. Later he directed Love and Hate: The Story of Colin and JoAnn Thatcher, the first Canadian-produced drama to play on primetime American television.

Mankiewicz died early of cancer at age 49.

== Filmography ==
=== Feature films ===
- The Time of the Hunt (Le Temps d'une chasse) - 1972
- A Childhood Friend (Une amie d'enfance) - 1978
- Good Riddance (Les bons débarras) - 1980
- Happy Memories (Les Beaux souvenirs) - 1981
- The Revolving Doors (Les Portes tournantes) - 1988

=== Other work ===
- Une cause civile (Short film, 1973)
- Un procès criminel (Short film, 1973)
- Valentin (Short film, 1973)
- L'orientation (Short film, 1974)
- Expropriation (Short film, 1975)
- Pointe Pelée (Short film, 1976)
- What We Have Here Is a People Problem (TV movie, 1976) (Created for TV Series For the Record)
- Suicide en prison (Short film aka I Was Dying Anyway, 1977)
- A Matter of Choice (TV movie, 1978) (Created for TV Series For the Record)
- Une journée à la Pointe Pelée (Documentary, 1978)
- The Sight (Short film, 1985)
- And Then You Die (TV movie, 1987)
- Love and Hate: The Story of Colin and JoAnn Thatcher (TV movie, 1989)
- Conspiracy of Silence (TV miniseries, 1991)

== Recognition ==
- 1993 Gemini Award for Best Direction in a Dramatic Program or Mini-Series - Conspiracy of Silence - Won
- 1990 Gemini Award for Best Direction in a Dramatic Program or Mini-Series - Love and Hate: The Story of Colin and JoAnn Thatcher - Won
- 1989 Genie Award for Best Achievement in Direction - The Revolving Doors (Les Portes tournantes) - Nominated
- 1989 Genie Award for Best Adapted Screenplay - The Revolving Doors (Les Portes tournantes) - Nominated (shared with Jacques Savoie)
- 1988 Cannes Film Festival Prize of the Ecumenical Jury - Special Mention - The Revolving Doors (Les Portes tournantes) - Won
- 1988 Gemini Award for Best Direction in a Dramatic Program or Mini-Series - And Then You Die - Nominated
- 1981 Genie Award for Best Achievement in Direction - Les bons débarras - Won
- 1980 Berlin Film Festival Golden Bear - Les bons débarras - Nominated
