= 1997 in Canada =

- Decades: 1970s; 1980s; 1990s; 2000s; 2010s
- See also: History of Canada; Timeline of Canadian history; List of years in Canada

Events from the year 1997 in Canada.

== Incumbents ==
=== Crown ===
- Monarch – Elizabeth II

=== Federal government ===
- Governor General – Roméo LeBlanc
- Prime Minister – Jean Chrétien
- Chief Justice – Antonio Lamer (Quebec)
- Parliament – 35th (until 27 April) then 36th (from September 22)

=== Provincial governments ===
==== Lieutenant governors ====
- Lieutenant Governor of Alberta – Bud Olson
- Lieutenant Governor of British Columbia – Garde Gardom
- Lieutenant Governor of Manitoba – Yvon Dumont
- Lieutenant Governor of New Brunswick – Margaret McCain (until April 18) then Marilyn Trenholme Counsell
- Lieutenant Governor of Newfoundland – Frederick Russell (until February 5) then Arthur Maxwell House
- Lieutenant Governor of Nova Scotia – James Kinley
- Lieutenant Governor of Ontario – Hal Jackman (until January 24) then Hilary Weston
- Lieutenant Governor of Prince Edward Island – Gilbert Clements
- Lieutenant Governor of Quebec – Jean-Louis Roux (until January 30) then Lise Thibault
- Lieutenant Governor of Saskatchewan – Jack Wiebe

==== Premiers ====
- Premier of Alberta – Ralph Klein
- Premier of British Columbia – Glen Clark
- Premier of Manitoba – Gary Filmon
- Premier of New Brunswick – Frank McKenna (until October 14) then Raymond Frenette
- Premier of Newfoundland – Brian Tobin
- Premier of Nova Scotia – John Savage (until July 18) then Russell MacLellan
- Premier of Ontario – Mike Harris
- Premier of Prince Edward Island – Pat Binns
- Premier of Quebec – Lucien Bouchard
- Premier of Saskatchewan – Roy Romanow

=== Territorial governments ===
==== Commissioners ====
- Commissioner of Yukon – Judy Gingell
- Commissioner of Northwest Territories – Helen Maksagak

==== Premiers ====
- Premier of the Northwest Territories – Don Morin
- Premier of Yukon – Piers McDonald

== Events ==
=== January to June ===
- January 1 – Opening of the new municipality of Alfred and Plantagenet.
- January 4 – The federal government makes it harder to obtain unemployment insurance.
- February 14 – Newsprint giants Abitibi-Price and Stone-Consolidated announce they are merging.
- March 6 – A new rigorous anti tobacco advertising law is passed.
- March 11 – Alberta election: Ralph Klein's PCs win an eighth consecutive majority.
- March 15 – Gilles Duceppe is elected leader of the Bloc Québécois.
- March 19 – Bre-X geologist Michael de Guzman jumps or is pushed from a helicopter in Indonesia.
- March 21 – Nova Scotia Premier John Savage announces his resignation.
- March 22 – Five members of the cult the Order of the Solar Temple commit mass suicide in Saint-Casimir, Quebec.
- April 22 – Massive flooding of the Red River in Manitoba leads to a state of emergency.
- May – Saint-Simon and Saint-Sauveur riots.
- May 11 – 1997 Nunavut equal representation plebiscite.
- May 31 – Confederation Bridge opens.
- June 1 – Donovan Bailey and Michael Johnson have a 150m race in the then Skydome for the title of "The World's Fastest Man".
- June 2 – Federal election: Jean Chrétien's Liberals win a second consecutive majority, the Reform Party becomes the Official Opposition.
- June 18 – The Canadian Radio-television and Telecommunications Commission (CRTC) introduces a television rating system.

=== July to September ===
- July 2 – The Somalia Inquiry is disbanded prematurely.
- July 9 – Danielle House forced to give up her Miss Canada International title after pleading guilty to assault.
- July 18 – Russell MacLellan becomes the new Premier of Nova Scotia.
- July 30 – Phil Fontaine elected head of the Assembly of First Nations.
- August 7 – Bjarni Tryggvason flies aboard the Space Shuttle.
- August 8 – The Saskatchewan Party is founded.
- August 10 – The director Jean-Claude Lauzon and actress Marie-Soleil Tougas dies in a plane crash near Kuujjuaq.
- September 2 – Newfoundlanders vote to do away with their religion based school systems.
- September 3 – One is killed in a Saskatchewan train derailment.
- September 15 – Caillou debuts on Teletoon.

=== October to December ===
- October 1 – Michel Bastarache is appointed to the Supreme Court.
- October 2 – Canada recalls its ambassador to Israel after Mossad uses forged Canadian passports.
- October 7 – An out-of-court settlement is reached between Brian Mulroney and the federal government regarding the Airbus affair.
- October 13 – Raymond Frenette becomes premier of New Brunswick, replacing Frank McKenna.
- October 13 – 43 are killed in Canada's worst ever traffic accident as a tour bus falls off a cliff.
- October 17 – CTV News Channel begins broadcasting.
- October 27–November 10 – A teachers strike takes place in Ontario.
- November 3 – Canada destroys the last land mines in its arsenal.
- November 9
  - The scandal-racked Saskatchewan Progressive Conservative Party is mothballed.
  - The World Wrestling Federation holds its Survivor Series pay-per-view event from the Molson Centre in Montreal, Quebec, where the Montreal Screwjob takes place. Bret Hart loses the WWF Championship to Shawn Michaels in controversial fashion, as WWF owner Vince McMahon orders referee Earl Hebner to end the match prematurely.
- November 14 – Fourteen-year-old Reena Virk is beaten to death by classmates in Victoria, British Columbia.
- November 17 – The Hibernia oil project pumps its first barrel of oil.
- November 21–25 – The APEC summit is held in Vancouver, British Columbia. Controversy arises when Royal Canadian Mounted Police use force and pepper spray to remove protesters.
- December 3 – In Ottawa, Ontario, representatives from 121 countries sign a treaty prohibiting the manufacture and deployment of anti-personnel land mines. However, the United States, the People's Republic of China, and Russia do not sign the treaty.

=== Full date unknown ===
- The Calgary Declaration from the premiers, except Lucien Bouchard.
- A second Sacred Assembly is held but issues no proclamation.

== Arts and literature ==
=== New Books ===
- Timothy Findley – You Went Away

=== Awards ===
- Giller Prize for Canadian Fiction: Mordecai Richler – Barney's Version
- See 1997 Governor General's Awards for a complete list of winners and finalists for those awards.
- Books in Canada First Novel Award: Anne Michaels, Fugitive Pieces
- Geoffrey Bilson Award: Janet McNaughton, To Dance at the Palais Royale
- Gerald Lampert Award: Marilyn Dumont, A Really Good Brown Girl
- Marian Engel Award: Katherine Govier
- Pat Lowther Award: Marilyn Bowering, Autobiography
- Stephen Leacock Award: Arthur Black, Black in the Saddle Again
- Trillium Book Award English: Dionne Brand, Land to Light On
- Trillium Book Award French: Roger Levac, Petite Crapaude!
- Vicky Metcalf Award: Tim Wynne-Jones

=== Film ===
- Atom Egoyan's The Sweet Hereafter is released, it is nominated for the Academy Award for Best Director

=== Television ===
- The Arrow, a mini-series about the Avro Arrow shows plays to great popularity and acclaim and the CBC
- Teletoon is launched

=== Music ===
- Oscar Peterson receives a Grammy for lifetime achievement.

== Sport ==
- February 7 – Lennox Lewis becomes heavyweight boxing champion.
- May 18 – Hull Olympiques win their only Memorial Cup by defeating the Lethbridge Hurricanes 5 to 1. The entire tournament was played at the Robert Guertin Centre in Hull, Quebec
- June 7 – Calgary's Mike Vernon of the Detroit Red Wings is awarded the Conn Smythe Trophy
- October 26 – Formula One: Jacques Villeneuve becomes the first Canadian to become World Drivers Champion.
- November 9 – The Montreal Screwjob takes place at Survivor Series. Bret Hart controversially loses his WWF Championship to Shawn Michaels.
- November 16 – Toronto Argonauts win their fourteenth Grey Cup by defeating the Saskatchewan Roughriders in the 85th Grey Cup played at Commonwealth Stadium in Edmonton. Hamilton, Ontario's Paul Masotti was awarded the game's Most Valuable Canadian
- November 22 – UBC Thunderbirds win their third Vanier Cup by defeating the Ottawa Gee-Gees by a score of 39–23 in the 33rd Vanier Cup played at Skydome in Toronto

== Births ==
- January 13 – Connor McDavid, hockey player
- January 15 – Alex Cardillo, Irish-born actor
- January 20 – Jeffrey Baldwin, murder victim (died 2002)
- January 29 – Cassandra Sawtell, actress
- March 9 – Niamh Wilson, actress
- March 10 – Travis Konecny, ice hockey player
- March 11 – Matreya Fedor, actress
- March 26 – Antoine L'Écuyer, actor
- April 23 – Alex Ferris, actor
- April 28 – Jason Spevack, actor
- May 5 – Mitch Marner, ice hockey player
- May 26 – Mathew Barzal, ice hockey player
- June 11 – Mackenzie Bent, ice dancer
- June 18 – Mary-Lynn Neil, singer and songwriter
- August 1 – Megan McNamara and Nicole McNamara, beach volleyball players
- August 3 – Ayaka Wilson, actor
- October 27 – Eliana Jones, actress and gymnast

== Deaths ==
=== January to March ===
- January 1 – Hagood Hardy, composer, pianist and vibraphonist (born 1937)
- January 12
  - Charles Brenton Huggins, physician, physiologist, cancer researcher and Nobel prize laureate (born 1901)
- January 14 – Dollard Ménard, lieutenant-colonel
- January 17 – Bill Kardash, politician (born 1912)
- January 26 – Norman Fawcett, politician (born 1910)
- February 19 – Lois Marshall, soprano (born 1924)
- March 2 – J. Carson Mark, mathematician who worked on development of nuclear weapons (born 1913)
- March 14 – Ivan Romanoff, conductor
- March 22 – Harry Thode, geochemist, nuclear chemist and academic administrator (born 1910)
- March 27 – Hugh Horner, politician, physician and surgeon (born 1925)

=== April to June ===
- April 6 – Jack Kent Cooke, sports entrepreneur (born 1912)
- May 1 – Fernand Dumont, sociologist, philosopher, theologian and poet (born 1927)
- May 9 – Marie-Thérèse Paquin, Canadian pianist (b. 1905)
- June 9 – Stanley Knowles, politician (born 1908)
- June 22
  - Gérard Pelletier, journalist, editor, politician and Minister (born 1919)
  - Larry Grossman, politician (born 1943)

=== July to September ===
- July 3 – Michael James MacDonald, politician and union leader (born 1909)
- July 25 – George Alexander Gale, chief justice of Ontario (born 1906)
- July 30 – Robert Bryce, civil servant (born 1910)
- August 10
  - Jean-Claude Lauzon, Quebec filmmaker (born 1953)
  - Marie-Soleil Tougas, Quebec actress and TV host (born 1970)
- August 20 – Léon Dion, political scientist (born 1922)
- August 24 – Hardial Bains, founder and leader of Communist Party of Canada (Marxist-Leninist) (born 1939)
- September 11 – Camille Henry, ice hockey player (born 1933)
- September 12 – Judith Merril, science fiction writer, editor and political activist (born 1923)
- September 30
  - Rose Goldblatt, administrator, pianist and teacher (born 1913)
  - Pierre Granche, sculptor (born 1948)

=== October to December ===
- October 12 – Rodrigue Bourdages, politician (born 1923)
- November 7 – Clyde Gilmour, radio broadcaster and journalist (born 1912)
- November 14 – Jack Pickersgill, civil servant and politician (born 1905)
- November 20 – Ronald Martland, Justice of the Supreme Court of Canada (born 1909)
- November 24
  - Czeslaw Brzozowicz, engineer (born 1911)
  - John Sopinka, lawyer and puisne justice on the Supreme Court of Canada (born 1933)
- November 27 – Yves Prévost, politician and lawyer (born 1908)
- December 7 – George R. Gardiner, businessman, philanthropist and co-founder of the Gardiner Museum (born 1917)
- December 24 – Pierre Péladeau, businessman (born 1925)

=== Full date unknown ===
- Hilda Watson, Leader of the Yukon Progressive Conservative Party (born 1922)

== See also ==
- 1997 in Canadian television
- List of Canadian films of 1997
