= 2000 in Canada =

- Decades: 1980s; 1990s; 2000s; 2010s; 2020s
- See also: History of Canada; Timeline of Canadian history; List of years in Canada

Events from the year 2000 in Canada.

== Incumbents ==
Estimated Canadian population: 30,790,834

=== Crown ===
- Monarch – Elizabeth II

=== Federal government ===
- Governor General – Adrienne Clarkson
- Prime Minister – Jean Chrétien
- Chief Justice – Antonio Lamer (Quebec) (until January 6) then Beverley McLachlin (British Columbia)
- Parliament – 36th (until October 22)

=== Provincial governments ===
==== Lieutenant governors ====
- Lieutenant Governor of Alberta – Bud Olson(until February 10) then Lois Hole
- Lieutenant Governor of British Columbia – Garde Gardom
- Lieutenant Governor of Manitoba – Peter Liba
- Lieutenant Governor of New Brunswick – Marilyn Trenholme Counsell
- Lieutenant Governor of Newfoundland – Arthur Maxwell House
- Lieutenant Governor of Nova Scotia – James Kinley (until May 17) then Myra Freeman
- Lieutenant Governor of Ontario – Hillary Weston
- Lieutenant Governor of Prince Edward Island – Gilbert Clements
- Lieutenant Governor of Quebec – Lise Thibault
- Lieutenant Governor of Saskatchewan – Jack Wiebe (until February 21) then Lynda Haverstock

==== Premiers ====
- Premier of Alberta – Ralph Klein
- Premier of British Columbia – Dan Miller (until February 24) then Ujjal Dosanjh
- Premier of Manitoba – Gary Doer
- Premier of New Brunswick – Bernard Lord
- Premier of Newfoundland – Brian Tobin (until October 16) then Beaton Tulk
- Premier of Nova Scotia – John Hamm
- Premier of Ontario – Mike Harris
- Premier of Prince Edward Island – Pat Binns
- Premier of Quebec – Lucien Bouchard
- Premier of Saskatchewan – Roy Romanow

=== Territorial governments ===
==== Commissioners ====
- Commissioner of Yukon – Judy Gingell (until October 1) then Jack Cable
- Commissioner of Northwest Territories – Daniel Joseph Marion (until March 31) then Glenna Hansen
- Commissioner of Nunavut – Helen Maksagak (until April 1) then Peter Irniq

==== Premiers ====
- Premier of the Northwest Territories – Jim Antoine (until January 17) then Stephen Kakfwi
- Premier of Nunavut – Paul Okalik
- Premier of Yukon – Piers McDonald (until May 6) then Pat Duncan

== Events ==
=== January to June ===
- January 1 – The magnitude 5.2 Kipawa earthquake occurs in Ontario and Quebec.
- January 7 – Beverley Mclachlin is sworn in as the 17th chief justice of Canada, and first woman to be appointed to that role.
- January 15 – CTV News Channel mistakenly airs tape of Avery Haines flubbing a line and joking about it in terms many viewers find offensive.
- January 19
  - Stephen Kakfwi becomes premier of the Northwest Territories, replacing James Antoine.
  - HRDC scandal hits the public as a result of an internal audit.
- February 7 – Rogers Communications buys Quebec's Vidéotron.
- February 15 – Thomson Corp sells all its newspaper holdings other than The Globe and Mail.
- February 24 – Ujjal Dosanjh becomes premier of British Columbia, replacing Dan Miller.
- March 15 – The House of Commons passes the Clarity Act outlining conditions for another Quebec separation referendum.
- March 25 – The Reform Party of Canada is dissolved and replaced with the Canadian Alliance.
- April 19 – Wiebo Ludwig is found guilty of a 1998 oil well bombing.
- May 6 – Pat Duncan becomes premier of Yukon, replacing Piers McDonald.
- May 11
  - Effective date of the first modern-day treaty between a First Nation and Canada: the Nisga'a Final Agreement.
  - The Alberta legislature passes a bill allowing the private sector to play a larger role in health care.
- May 12 – The Bank of Canada withdraws the $1,000 bill from circulation to fight against money laundering and organized crime.
- May 24 – E. coli outbreak in Walkerton, Ontario. It will eventually kill nine people.
- May 25 – The remains of an unidentified Canadian soldier killed in France in World War I are brought back to Canada and buried in the Tomb of the Unknown Soldier in Ottawa.
- June 17 – Seagram announces plans to merge with France's Vivendi.
- June 29 – Canada passes the Modernization of Benefits and Obligations Act, which extends full benefits and obligations to persons in homosexual relationships, excluding the right to marry.

=== July to December ===
- July 8 – Stockwell Day is elected the first leader of the Canadian Alliance party.
- July 12 – Matthew Coon Come is elected leader of the Assembly of First Nations.
- July 14 – A tornado near Pine Lake, Alberta, kills eleven people.
- July 31 – Conrad Black's Hollinger sells almost all its Canadian newspaper holdings to Izzy Asper's CanWest.
- August – The prohibition of marijuana is ruled illegal by an Ontario court.
- August 15 – Michael Cowpland resigns as CEO of Corel.
- August 26 – Sponsorship scandal: Minister of Public Works Alfonso Gagliano is criticized for giving contracts to a firm that employs his son.
- September 9 – Star Ray TV, a pirate television station in Toronto, begins broadcasting.
- September 26 – Long-serving Saskatchewan Premier Roy Romanow announces his plans to retire.
- September 28 to October 3 – Death and state funeral of Pierre Trudeau, former prime minister.
- October 16 – Beaton Tulk becomes premier of Newfoundland, replacing Brian Tobin.
- October 27 – The Royal Canadian Mounted Police arrest Ripudaman Singh Malik and Ajaib Singh Bagri in connection with the bombing of Air India Flight 182.
- November 21 – Launch of Anik F1 Canada's most powerful communications satellite to date.
- November 27 – In the 2000 Canadian election Jean Chrétien's Liberals increase their majority in the House of Commons.
- November 30 – Marc Garneau returns to space for a third time.
- December – The federal government opens a marijuana growing operation in an abandoned mine in Manitoba.

== Arts and literature ==
=== New works ===
- The Blind Assassin: Margaret Atwood
- Virtual War: Kosovo and Beyond: Michael Ignatieff
- Star-Spangled Canadians: Jeffrey Simpson
- Island: Alistair MacLeod
- The Farfarers, Before the Norse: Farley Mowat
- No Logo: Naomi Klein
- City of Glass: Douglas Coupland
- Before You're a Stranger: Raymond Fraser

=== Plays ===
- Elizabeth Rex – Timothy Findley

=== Literary awards ===
- Margaret Atwood wins the Booker Prize for The Blind Assassin
- Michael Ondaatje wins the Prix Médicis for Anil's Ghost
- Giller Prize for Canadian Fiction: Michael Ondaatje: Anil's Ghost and David Adams Richards: Mercy Among the Children
- See 2000 Governor General's Awards for a complete list of winners and finalists for those awards.
- Nega Mezlekia's non-fiction win for Notes from the Hyena's Belly becomes a subject of controversy when poet Anne Stone alleges that she ghostwrote the majority of the book. Stone was subsequently sued for defamation by Mezlekia, who stated that Stone's role in the book's publication was strictly that of a copy editor.
- Books in Canada First Novel Award: Arthur Black, Black Tie and Tales
- Gerald Lampert Award: Shawna Lemay, All the God-Sized Fruit
- Griffin Poetry Prize: Margaret Avison, Concrete and Wild Carrot
- Marian Engel Award: Anita Rau Badami
- Norma Fleck Award: Simon Tookoome and Sheldon Oberman, The Shaman's Nephew: A Life in the Far North
- Pat Lowther Award: Esta Spalding, Lost August
- Stephen Leacock Award: Arthur Black, Black Tie and Tales
- Trillium Book Award English: Don Coles, Kurgan
- Trillium Book Award French: Didier Leclair, Toronto, je t'aime
- Vicky Metcalf Award: Sheree Fitch

=== Television ===
- Who Wants to Be a Millionaire: Canadian Edition shows for two episodes

=== Music ===
- Barenaked Ladies, Maroon
- Nelly Furtado, Whoa, Nelly!
- Sarah Harmer, You Were Here
- King Cobb Steelie, Mayday
- The Tragically Hip, Music at Work
- The Weakerthans, Left and Leaving

== Sport ==
- May 28 – Rimouski Océanic wins their first Memorial Cup by defeating the Barrie Colts 6 to 2. The entire tournament is played at Halifax Metro Centre in Halifax, Nova Scotia
- June 10 – Kitchener, Ontario's Scott Stevens of the New Jersey Devils is awarded the Conn Smythe Trophy
- November 26 – BC Lions win their fourth Grey Cup by defeating the Montreal Alouettes 28 to 26 in the 88th Grey Cup played at McMahon Stadium in Calgary. Vancouver's Sean Millington is awarded the game's Most Valuable Canadian
- December 2 – Ottawa Gee-Gees win their second Vanier Cup by defeating the Regina Rams 42 to 39 in the 36th Vanier Cup played at Skydome in Toronto

== Births ==
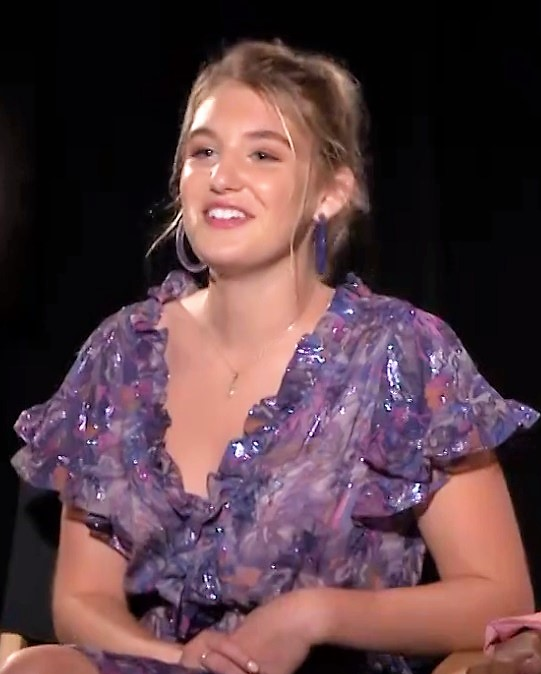
Sophie Nélisse

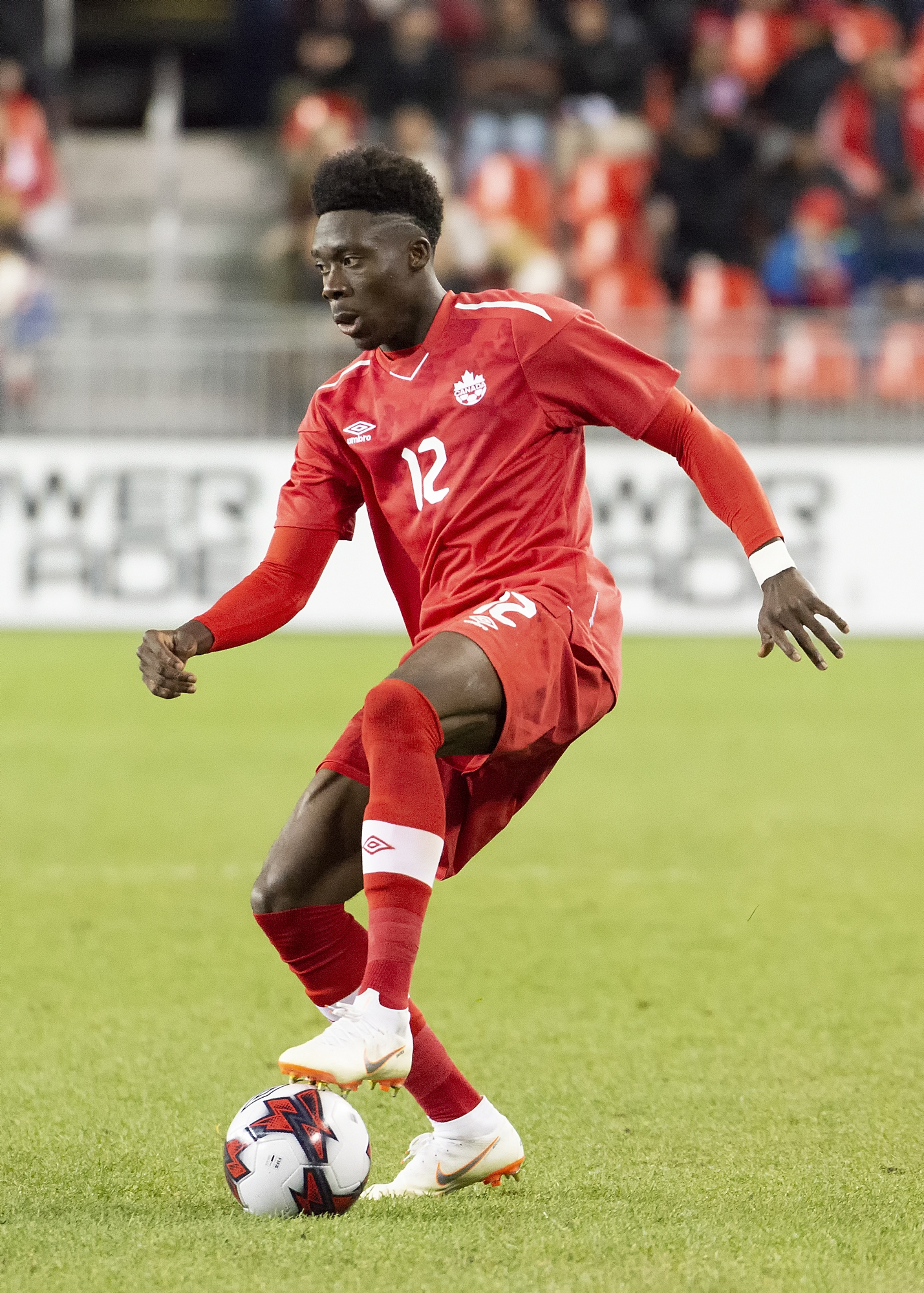
Alphonso Davies

- February – Erika Nordby
- February 8 – Chase Wouters, ice hockey player
- February 23 – Christian Martyn, actor
- February 25 – Daniel Benoit, Canadian-American son of Chris Benoit (died 2007)
- March 27 – Sophie Nélisse, actress
- May 18 – Addison Holley, actress
- May 23 – Evan Bird, actor
- May 23 – Leah John, golfer
- June 13 – Penny Oleksiak, swimmer
- June 14 – RJ Barrett, Canadian basketball player
- June 16 – Bianca Andreescu, Canadian tennis player
- July 15 – Victoria Stafford, murder victim (died 2009)
- July 17 – Maria Aragon, singer
- August 8 – Félix Auger-Aliassime, tennis player
- August 26 – Noah Ryan Scott, actor
- September 1 – Jacob Ewaniuk, actor
- November 2 – Alphonso Davies, football player
- November 21 – Megan Roberts, artistic gymnast
- December 17 – Twomad, YouTuber (died 2024)

== Deaths ==
=== January to March ===
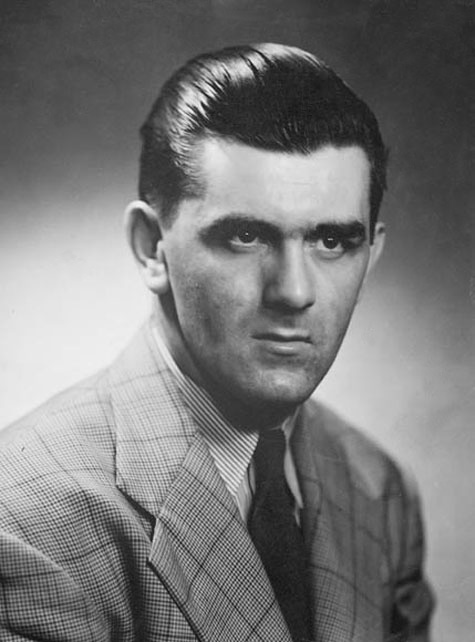
Maurice Richard died May 27

- January 15 – Georges-Henri Lévesque, Dominican priest and sociologist (b. 1903)
- January 22 – Anne Hébert, author and poet (b. 1916)
- January 26 – A. E. van Vogt, science fiction author (b. 1912)
- February 5 – Barbara Pentland, composer (b. 1912)
- February 7
  - Sid Abel, ice hockey player and coach (b. 1918)
  - Doug Henning, magician, illusionist and escape artist (b. 1947)
  - Wilfred Cantwell Smith, professor of comparative religion (b. 1916)
- February 11 – Wilfred Sénéchal, lawyer, a decorated World War II soldier, and politician (b. 1918)
- February 18 – Sheldon Turcott, journalist (b. 1936)
- February 21 – Violet Archer, composer, teacher, pianist, organist and percussionist (b. 1913)
- March 3 – Sandra Schmirler, curler, Olympic gold medallist and World Champion (b. 1962)
- March 5 – Daniel Yanofsky, chess player, Canada's first chess grandmaster (b. 1925)
- March 6 – John Colicos, actor (b. 1928)
- March 9 – Jean Coulthard, composer and academic (b. 1908)
- March 16 – Michael Starr, politician and first Canadian cabinet minister of Ukrainian descent (b. 1910)
- March 20 – Gene Eugene, actor, record producer, engineer, composer and musician (b. 1961)

=== April to June ===
- April 23 – Al Purdy, poet (b. 1918)
- May 22 – Davie Fulton, politician and judge (b. 1916)
- May 27 – Maurice Richard, ice hockey player (b. 1921)
- June 21 – Claude Bissell, author and educator (b. 1916)

=== July to December ===
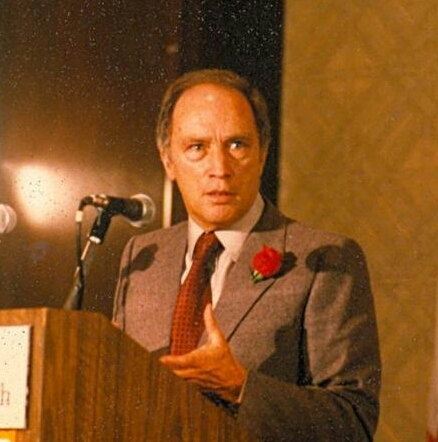
Pierre Trudeau died September 28

- July 12 – Charles Merritt, recipient of the Victoria Cross and Member of Parliament (b. 1908)
- July 21 – Frank Miller, politician and 19th Premier of Ontario (b. 1927)
- August 1 – Hugh Hood, novelist, short story writer, essayist and university professor (b. 1928)
- September 10 – Ben Wicks, cartoonist, illustrator, journalist and author (b. 1926)
- September 21 – Jacques Flynn, politician and senator (b. 1915)
- September 24 – Marcel Lambert, politician and Speaker of the House of Commons of Canada (b. 1919)
- September 27 – Sammy Luftspring, boxer (b. 1916)
- September 28 – Pierre Trudeau, politician and 15th Prime Minister of Canada (b. 1919)
- September 29 – Myles Ferguson, actor (b. 1981)
- October 4 – Michael Smith, biochemist, 1993 Nobel Prize in Chemistry laureate (b. 1932)
- October 27 – Tim Ralfe, journalist (b. 1938)

== See also ==
- 2000 in Canadian television
- List of Canadian films of 2000
