= 1996 in Canada =

- Decades: 1970s; 1980s; 1990s; 2000s; 2010s
- See also: History of Canada; Timeline of Canadian history; List of years in Canada

Events from the year 1996 in Canada.

== Incumbents ==
=== Crown ===
- Monarch – Elizabeth II

=== Federal government ===
- Governor General – Roméo LeBlanc
- Prime Minister – Jean Chrétien
- Chief Justice – Antonio Lamer (Quebec)
- Parliament – 35th

=== Provincial governments ===
==== Lieutenant governors ====
- Lieutenant Governor of Alberta – Gordon Towers (until April 17) then Bud Olson
- Lieutenant Governor of British Columbia – Garde Gardom
- Lieutenant Governor of Manitoba – Yvon Dumont
- Lieutenant Governor of New Brunswick – Margaret McCain
- Lieutenant Governor of Newfoundland – Frederick Russell
- Lieutenant Governor of Nova Scotia – James Kinley
- Lieutenant Governor of Ontario – Hal Jackman
- Lieutenant Governor of Prince Edward Island – Gilbert Clements
- Lieutenant Governor of Quebec – Martial Asselin (until August 8) then Jean-Louis Roux
- Lieutenant Governor of Saskatchewan – Jack Wiebe

==== Premiers ====
- Premier of Alberta – Ralph Klein
- Premier of British Columbia – Mike Harcourt (until February 22) then Glen Clark
- Premier of Manitoba – Gary Filmon
- Premier of New Brunswick – Frank McKenna
- Premier of Newfoundland – Clyde Wells (until January 26) then Brian Tobin
- Premier of Nova Scotia – John Savage
- Premier of Ontario – Mike Harris
- Premier of Prince Edward Island – Catherine Callbeck (until October 9) then Keith Milligan (October 9 to November 27) then Pat Binns
- Premier of Quebec – Jacques Parizeau (until January 29) then Lucien Bouchard
- Premier of Saskatchewan – Roy Romanow

=== Territorial governments ===
==== Commissioners ====
- Commissioner of Yukon – Judy Gingell
- Commissioner of Northwest Territories – Helen Maksagak

==== Premiers ====
- Premier of the Northwest Territories – Don Morin
- Premier of Yukon – John Ostashek (until October 19) then Piers McDonald

== Events ==
=== January to March ===
- January 1 – Fort Norman, Northwest Territories, is renamed to Tulita.
- January 14 – A free trade agreement with Israel is announced.
- January 15 – The Corel Centre opens in Ottawa.
- January 25 – Jean Chrétien launches a major cabinet shuffle. Pierre Pettigrew and Stéphane Dion are brought in, despite not having seats in Parliament.
- January 26 – Brian Tobin becomes premier of Newfoundland, replacing Clyde Wells.
- January 29 – Lucien Bouchard becomes premier of Quebec, replacing Jacques Parizeau.
- February 7 – Bob Rae, former premier of Ontario leaves politics.
- February 14 – Mr. Dressup does his last show.
- February 15 – At a ceremony marking the first National Flag of Canada Day, Chrétien throttles a protester in Hull, Quebec, launching a small controversy over the "Shawinigan Handshake".
- February 17 – Michel Gauthier is elected new leader of the Bloc Québécois.
- February 22 – Glen Clark becomes premier of British Columbia, replacing Michael Harcourt.
- February 22 – Brian Tobin leads the Newfoundland Liberal Party to victory in the 1996 Newfoundland election.

=== March to June ===
- March 6 – The federal budget continues the assault on the deficit.
- March 26 – The Anik E-1 satellite malfunctions.
- March 27 – The Quebec budget proposes sweeping cuts to government funding.
- April 3 – All members of the Canadian Forces are ordered to spend the entire day searching for documents that may aid the Somalia inquiry.
- April 5 – Gunman Mark Chahal kills nine relatives in Vernon, British Columbia before killing himself.
- April 11 – The Ontario government announce a 15 per cent reduction in the civil service.
- April 22 – John Nunziata is expelled from the Liberal caucus for voting against the budget.
- April 23 – Nova Scotia, New Brunswick, and Newfoundland agree to replace their provincial sales taxes and the Goods and Services Tax with a Harmonized Sales Tax.
- May 8 – The Ontario government cuts provincial income taxes by 30 per cent.
- May 10 – Member of Parliament Jan Brown resigns from the Reform Party of Canada.
- May 19 – Marc Garneau flies on a second space mission.
- May 24 – Conrad Black's Hollinger takes over the Southam newspaper chain.
- May 28 – The British Columbia New Democratic Party wins a surprise re-election.
- June 10 – The Quebec government reintroduces the "Language police".
- June 17 – Sheila Copps, who had resigned over the GST, wins back her Hamilton–Wentworth seat in a by-election.
- June 20 – Robert Thirsk flies aboard the Space Shuttle Columbia.
- June 24 – A riot in Quebec City causes a million dollars in damage.

=== July to September ===
- July 7 – July 11 – A major AIDS conference is held in Vancouver.
- July 20 – July 21 – Floods in Quebec kill ten.
- July 25 – Coach House Press closes.
- August 8 – Former Prime Minister Kim Campbell is named consul general to Los Angeles.
- August 8 – Jean-Louis Roux appointed Lieutenant-Governor of Quebec.
- August 29 – Former B.C. Premier W.R. Bennett is found guilty of insider trading.
- September 29 – Fifteen-year-old Melanie Ethier vanishes without a trace in New Liskeard, Ontario, sparking a decades-long police investigation.

=== October to December ===
- October 4 – Defence Minister David Collenette resigns.
- October 10 – Keith Milligan becomes premier of Prince Edward Island, replacing Catherine Callbeck.
- October 19 – Piers McDonald becomes government leader of Yukon, replacing John Ostashek.
- November – SaskTel becomes the first Canadian Internet service provider to roll out ADSL.
- November – The last federally run Indian residential school (the Gordon Residential School), closed in Punnichy, Saskatchewan.
- November 5 – Jean-Louis Roux forced to resign as Lieutenant Governor of Quebec when pictures of him at Nazi rallies in the 1930s are published.
- November 27 – Pat Binns becomes premier of Prince Edward Island, replacing Keith Milligan.
- December 1 – Dalton McGuinty is elected leader of the Ontario Liberal Party.
- December 16 – Chrétien formally apologizes for lying about the GST.

=== Full date unknown ===
- Karen Kain becomes the first Canadian to win the Cartier Lifetime Achievement Award.
- General Jean Boyle resigns over Somalia Affair controversy.
- Canada sends over a thousand troops to take part in IFOR.
- James McGill Statue unveiled.

== Arts and literature ==
=== New books ===
- John Ralston Saul: The Unconscious Civilization
- Nancy Huston: Slow Emergencies
- Pierre Berton: Farewell to the Twentieth Century
- Elisabeth Harvor: Let Me Be the One
- Yann Martel: Self
- Timothy Findley: You Went Away
- Di Brandt: Dancing Naked: Narrative Strategies for Writing Across Centuries
- Douglas Coupland: Polaroids from the Dead
- Guy Vanderhaeghe: The Englishman's Boy

=== Awards ===
- Giller Prize for Canadian Fiction: Margaret Atwood, Alias Grace
- See 1996 Governor General's Awards for a complete list of winners and finalists for those awards.
- Books in Canada First Novel Award: Keath Fraser, Popular Anatomy
- Geoffrey Bilson Award: Marianne Brandis, Rebellion: A Novel of Upper Canada
- Gerald Lampert Award: Maureen Hynes, Rough Skin
- Marian Engel Award: Barbara Gowdy
- Pat Lowther Award: Lorna Crozier, Everything Arrives at the Light
- Stephen Leacock Award: Marsha Boulton, Letters from the Country
- Trillium Book Award English: Anne Michaels, Fugitive Pieces
- Trillium Book Award French: Nancy Vickers, Le Pied de Sappho and Alain Bernard Marchand, Tintin au pays de la ferveur
- Vicky Metcalf Award: Margaret Buffie

=== New music ===
- Barenaked Ladies: Born on a Pirate Ship
- Bruce Cockburn: The Charity of Night
- The Tragically Hip: Trouble at the Henhouse
- Sloan: One Chord to Another
- Various artists: 20 Years of Stony Plain

== Sport ==
- January 15 – The Corel Centre opens in Ottawa
- February 1 – With the exception of the Baltimore Stallions, all the U.S.-based CFL teams (San Antonio Texans, Las Vegas Posse, Shreveport Pirates, Birmingham Barracudas and the Memphis Mad Dogs) fold. The Stallions are relocated from Baltimore, Maryland, to Montreal, Quebec, and become the Montreal Allouettes
- February 27 – The Los Angeles Kings trade Wayne Gretzky to the St. Louis Blues.
- March 11 – The Montreal Canadiens play their final game at the Montreal Forum by defeating the Dallas Stars 4 to 1.
- March 16 – The Montreal Canadiens play their first game at the Molson Centre against the New York Rangers.
- May 19 – The Granby Prédateurs win their only Memorial Cup by defeating the Peterborough Petes 4 to 0. The entire tournament was played at Peterborough Memorial Centre in Peterborough, Ontario.
- July 1 – The Winnipeg Jets relocate from Winnipeg, Manitoba, to Phoenix, Arizona, to become the Phoenix Coyotes.
- July 19 – The Atlanta Olympics open. Canadian sprinter Donovan Bailey wins the 100-metre dash.
- July 26 – Gretzky signs with the New York Rangers.
- November 24 – The Toronto Argonauts win their 13th Grey Cup by defeating the Edmonton Eskimos in the 84th Grey Cup played at Ivor Wynne Stadium in Hamilton, Ontario. Mike Vanderjagt is named the game's Most Valuable Canadian
- November 30 – Saskatchewan Huskies win their second Vanier Cup by defeating the St. Francis Xavier X-Men 31–12 in the 32nd Vanier Cup played at SkyDome in Toronto

== Births ==
=== January to June ===
- January 18 – Brittany Jones, pair skater
- January 20 – Roland McKeown, ice hockey defenceman
- January 22
  - Dillon Brooks, basketball player
  - Joshua Ho-Sang, ice hockey player
- January 31 – Ana Golja, actress and singer
- February 5 – Megan McKinnon, actress
- February 7 – Aaron Ekblad, hockey player
- March 22 – Gig Morton, actor
- March 26 – Alaine Chartrand, figure skater
- April 3 – Sarah Jeffery, actress and singer
- April 26 – Jennifer Gillis, actress, dancer and singer
- May 1 – William Nylander, ice hockey player
- May 10 – Pressa, rapper
- May 14 – Pokimane, online personality
- May 19 – Sarah Grey, actress
- June 8 – Jayden Dalke, Canadian football player (d. 2026)
- June 12 – Mitchell Gordon, figure skater
- June 14 – Madeline Edwards, ice dancer
- June 20
  - Sam Bennett, ice hockey player
  - Michael Dal Colle, ice hockey player
- June 28 – Larissa Werbicki, rower

=== July to December ===
- July 1 – KallMeKris, online personality
- July 6 – Robert Naylor, actor
- July 11 – Alessia Cara, singer/songwriter
- August 7 – Liam James, actor
- August 12 – Torri Webster, actress
- August 29 – Linden Porco, actor
- September 1 – Alexandra Kamieniecki, Polish figure skater
- September 5 – Helaina Cyr, basketball player
- September 26 – Cesar Corrales, Mexico-born actor and dancer
- October 28
  - Laine MacNeil, actress
  - Hanson Boakai, Guinea-born soccer player
- November 5 – Victoria Moors, gymnast
- November 7 – Julianne Séguin, figure skater
- November 18 – Smoke Dawg, rapper (d. 2018)
- November 27 – Amanda Todd, cyberbullying victim (d. 2012)
- December 10 – Jérémy Gabriel, singer and actor

=== Full date unknown ===
- Diego Gomes

== Deaths ==
=== January to March ===
- January 21 – René Marc Jalbert, soldier
- February 7 – Lucien Maynard, leader of Alberta francophones
- February 19 – Ernest Manning, politician and 8th Premier of Alberta (born 1908)
- February 29 – Sinclair Ross, banker and author (born 1908)
- March 28 – Edith Fowke, folk song collector, author and radio presenter (born 1913)

=== April to June ===
- April 1 – Jean Le Moyne, journalist and politician (born 1913)
- April 13 – Stewart McLean, politician (born 1913)
- April 23 – Jean Victor Allard, general and first French-Canadian to become Chief of the Defence Staff (born 1913)
- May 5 – Salli Terri, singer, arranger, recording artist and songwriter (born 1922)
- May 9 – Eria Fachin, pop singer (born 1960)
- May 22 – Robert Christie, actor and director (born 1913)
- June 11 – George Hees, politician and Minister (born 1910)

=== July to September ===
- July 1 – Harold Greenberg, film producer (born 1930)
- July 3 – Rebecca Jane Middleton, murder victim (born 1979)
- July 5 – Fred Davis, broadcaster and moderator of Front Page Challenge (born 1921)
- July 18 – Robert Needham, journalist
- July 22 – Carl Goldenberg, lawyer, arbitrator, mediator and Senator (born 1907)
- August 10 – Walter MacNutt, organist (born 1910)
- August 21 – Mary Two-Axe Earley, indigenous women's rights activist (born 1911)
- September 22 – Ludmilla Chiriaeff, ballet dancer, choreographer and director (born 1924)
- September 23 – Joe Borowski, politician and activist (born 1933)

=== October to December ===
- October 2 – Robert Bourassa, politician and 22nd Premier of Quebec (born 1933)
- October 9 – Colleen Peterson, singer (born 1950)
- October 11
  - Joe Morris, trade unionist and president of the Canadian Labour Congress (born 1913)
  - William Vickrey, professor of economics and Nobel Laureate (born 1914)
- October 14 – Marcel Bourbonnais, politician (born 1918)
- October 17 – Laura Sabia, social activist and feminist (born 1916)
- October 19 – James Bourque, First Nations activist (born 1935)
- October 23
  - Kurt Freund, physician and sexologist (born 1914)
  - Thomas Ide, educator and the founding Chairman of TVOntario (born 1919)
- October 27 – Arthur Tremblay, politician and Senator (born 1917)
- October 28 – Reuben Baetz, politician (born 1923)
- November 9 – Joe Ghiz, politician and 29th Premier of Prince Edward Island (born 1945)
- November 18 – John Josiah Robinette, lawyer (born 1906)
- December 1 – Peter Bronfman, businessman (born 1928)
- December 5 – Wilf Carter, country music singer, songwriter, guitarist and yodeller (born 1904)
- December 21 – Clarence Gosse, physician and Lieutenant Governor of Nova Scotia (born 1912)
- December 24 – Al Adair, politician, radio broadcaster and author (born 1929)
- December 29 – Dorothy Livesay, poet (born 1909)

=== Full date unknown ===
- Leo Landreville, politician and judge implicated in the Northern Ontario Natural Gas scandal (born 1910)

== See also ==
- 1996 in Canadian television
- List of Canadian films of 1996
