= 1911 in Canada =

- Decades: 1890s; 1900s; 1910s; 1920s; 1930s
- See also: History of Canada; Timeline of Canadian history; List of years in Canada

Events from the year 1911 in Canada.

== Incumbents ==
=== Crown ===
- Monarch – George V

=== Federal government ===
- Governor General – Albert Grey, 4th Earl Grey (until October 13) then Prince Arthur, Duke of Connaught and Strathearn
- Prime Minister – Wilfrid Laurier (until October 6) then Robert Borden (from October 10)
- Chief Justice – Charles Fitzpatrick (Quebec)
- Parliament – 11th (until 29 July) then 12th (from 15 November)

=== Provincial governments ===
==== Lieutenant governors ====
- Lieutenant Governor of Alberta – George Hedley Vicars Bulyea
- Lieutenant Governor of British Columbia – Thomas Wilson Paterson
- Lieutenant Governor of Manitoba – Daniel Hunter McMillan (until August 1) then Douglas Colin Cameron
- Lieutenant Governor of New Brunswick – Lemuel John Tweedie
- Lieutenant Governor of Nova Scotia – James Drummond McGregor
- Lieutenant Governor of Ontario – John Morison Gibson
- Lieutenant Governor of Prince Edward Island – Benjamin Rogers
- Lieutenant Governor of Quebec – Charles Alphonse Pantaléon Pelletier (until May 5) then François Langelier
- Lieutenant Governor of Saskatchewan – George William Brown

==== Premiers ====
- Premier of Alberta – Arthur Sifton
- Premier of British Columbia – Richard McBride
- Premier of Manitoba – Rodmond Roblin
- Premier of New Brunswick – John Douglas Hazen (until October 16) then James Kidd Flemming
- Premier of Nova Scotia – George Henry Murray
- Premier of Ontario – James Whitney
- Premier of Prince Edward Island – Francis Haszard (until May 16) then Herbert James Palmer (May 16 to December 2) then John Mathieson
- Premier of Quebec – Lomer Gouin
- Premier of Saskatchewan – Thomas Walter Scott

=== Territorial governments ===
==== Commissioners ====
- Commissioner of Yukon – Alexander Henderson (until June 1) then Arthur Wilson (acting)
- Gold Commissioner of Yukon – F.X. Gosselin
- Commissioner of Northwest Territories – Frederick D. White

== Events ==
- January 11 – Fort Vermilion records the coldest temperature in North America at −61.2 °C (−78.2 °F), holding the record until 1947.
- May 16 – James Palmer becomes Premier of Prince Edward Island, replacing F. L. Haszard
- June 14 – Nova Scotia election: George Henry Murray's Liberals win a second consecutive majority
- September 21 – Federal election: Robert Borden's Conservatives win a majority, defeating Sir Wilfrid Laurier's Liberals
- October 4 – John Young Monument unveiled
- October 10 – Robert Borden becomes prime minister, replacing Sir Wilfrid Laurier
- October 16 – James Flemming becomes Premier of New Brunswick, replacing Sir John Hazen
- December 2 – John Mathieson becomes premier of Prince Edward Island, replacing James Palmer
- December 11 – Ontario election: Sir James Whitney's Conservatives win a third consecutive majority

== Sport ==
- November 25 – University of Toronto Varsity Blues defeated the Toronto Argonauts 14 to 7 in the 3rd Grey Cup played at Toronto's Varsity Stadium

=== Full date unknown ===
- Association of Universities and Colleges of Canada is founded.
- Dominion Parks Branch is established, the world's first national park service, now called Parks Canada.

== Arts and literature ==
Popular artworks

- Autumn In France by Emily Carr.

== Births ==
=== Unknown date ===
- Stuart Trueman, journalist and writer

=== January to June ===
- January 3 – Jean Bourcier, ice hockey player
- January 27 – Blanche Meagher, diplomat
- February 3 – Robert Charboneau, writer
- March 12 – Stanley Bréhaut Ryerson, historian, educator and political activist (d.1998)
- April 22 – Alexander Bell Patterson, politician (d.1993)
- April 29 – Andrew Hill Clark, geographer
- May 11
  - William Cecil Ross, politician (d.1998)
  - Mitchell Sharp, politician and Minister (d.2004)
- May 12 – Dorothy Rungeling, aviator (d.2018)
- June 24 – Portia White, singer (d.1968)
- June 28 – Czeslaw Brzozowicz, engineer (d.1997)

=== July to December ===
- July 18 – Hume Cronyn, actor (d.2003)
- July 21 – Marshall McLuhan, educator, philosopher, and scholar (d.1980)
- August 5 – Albert Sanschagrin, Bishop of Saint-Hyacinthe, Quebec (d.2009)
- August 28 – Nérée Arsenault, politician (d.1982)
- September 18 – Helen Doan, supercentenarian (d. 2024)
- October 4 – Mary Two-Axe Earley, indigenous women's rights activist (d. 1996)
- October 5 – Pierre Dansereau, ecologist (d.2011)

== Deaths ==
- March 11 – Théotime Blanchard, farmer, merchant and politician (b.1844)
- April 14 – Henri Elzéar Taschereau, jurist and 4th Chief Justice of Canada (b.1836)
- April 29 – Charles Alphonse Pantaléon Pelletier, lawyer, militia officer, politician, publisher, judge, and the 9th Lieutenant Governor of Quebec (b.1837)
- November 6 – John Carling, businessman and politician (b.1828)
- December 12 – Daniel J. Greene, politician and Prime Minister of Newfoundland (b.1850)
