= 1913 in Canada =

- Decades: 1890s; 1900s; 1910s; 1920s; 1930s
- See also: History of Canada; Timeline of Canadian history; List of years in Canada

Events from the year 1913 in Canada.

== Incumbents ==
=== Crown ===
- Monarch – George V

=== Federal government ===
- Governor General – Prince Arthur, Duke of Connaught and Strathearn
- Prime Minister – Robert Borden
- Chief Justice – Charles Fitzpatrick (Quebec)
- Parliament – 12th

=== Provincial governments ===
==== Lieutenant governors ====
- Lieutenant Governor of Alberta – George H. V. Bulyea
- Lieutenant Governor of British Columbia – Thomas Wilson Paterson
- Lieutenant Governor of Manitoba – Douglas Cameron
- Lieutenant Governor of New Brunswick – Josiah Wood
- Lieutenant Governor of Nova Scotia – James Drummond McGregor
- Lieutenant Governor of Ontario – John Morison Gibson
- Lieutenant Governor of Prince Edward Island – Benjamin Rogers
- Lieutenant Governor of Quebec – François Langelier
- Lieutenant Governor of Saskatchewan – George William Brown

==== Premiers ====
- Premier of Alberta – Arthur Sifton
- Premier of British Columbia – Richard McBride
- Premier of Manitoba – Rodmond Roblin
- Premier of New Brunswick – James Kidd Flemming
- Premier of Nova Scotia – George Henry Murray
- Premier of Ontario – James Whitney
- Premier of Prince Edward Island – John Alexander Mathieson
- Premier of Quebec – Lomer Gouin
- Premier of Saskatchewan – Thomas Walter Scott

=== Territorial governments ===
==== Commissioners ====
- Commissioner of Yukon – George Black
- Gold Commissioner of Yukon – George P. MacKenzie
- Commissioner of Northwest Territories – Frederick D. White

== Events ==
- March 27 – Le Droit first published in French
- April 17 – 1913 Alberta general election: Arthur Sifton's Liberals win a third consecutive majority
- June 2 – The High Level Bridge (Edmonton) opens, with two lanes of traffic on the lower deck, and two streetcar tracks and one CPR track on the upper deck
- November 7 – November 8 – A storm on the Great Lakes sinks some thirty-four ships
- November 17 – The National Transcontinental Railway is completed

== Sport ==
- March 1 – The Quebec Bulldogs win their second Stanley Cup.
- March 7 – The Victoria Senators win their first Pacific Coast Hockey Association championship.
- November 29 – The Hamilton Tigers win their first Grey Cup by defeating the Toronto Parkdale Canoe Club 44 to 2 in the 5th Grey Cup played at Hamilton, Ontario's A.A.A. Grounds.
- Unknown - The Winnipeg Hockey Club defeats the Edmonton Eskimos to win the 1913 Allan Cup.

=== Unknown date ===
- June – Start of the Canadian Arctic Expedition 1913–1916 a scientific expedition in the Arctic Circle organized and led by Vilhjalmur Stefansson.
- Laura Secord Chocolates opens

== Arts and literature ==
=== New Books ===
- Maria Chapdelaine

== Births ==
=== January to June ===
- January 13 – Philip Gaglardi, politician (d. 1995)
- March 11 – John Weinzweig, composer (d. 2006)
- March 24 – Émile Benoît, musician (d. 1992)
- April 4 – Jules Léger, diplomat and Governor General of Canada (d. 1980)
- April 24 – Violet Archer, composer, teacher, pianist, organist and percussionist (d. 2000)
- April 30 – Edith Fowke, folk song collector, author and radio presenter (d. 1996)
- May 15 – John Duffie, writer (d. 1989)
- May 27 – James Page Mackey, chief of Toronto Police Service (d. 2009)
- June 12 – Jean Victor Allard, general and first French-Canadian to become Chief of the Defence Staff (d. 1996)
- June 14 – Joe Morris, trade unionist and president of the Canadian Labour Congress (d. 1996)
- June 18 – Wilfred Gordon Bigelow, heart surgeon (d. 2005)

=== July to December ===
- July 6 – J. Carson Mark, mathematician who worked on development of nuclear weapons (d. 1997)
- July 16 – Woodrow Stanley Lloyd, politician and 8th Premier of Saskatchewan (d. 1972)
- August 28
  - Robertson Davies, novelist, playwright, critic, journalist and professor (d. 1995)
  - Rose Goldblatt, administrator, pianist and teacher (d. 1997)
- September 20 – Robert Christie, actor and director (d. 1996)
- October 5 – Horace Gwynne, boxer and Olympic gold medalist (d. 2001)
- November 7 – Elizabeth Bradford Holbrook, portrait sculptor (d. 2009)
- November 8 – June Havoc, actress, dancer, writer, and theater director (d. 2010)
- November 16 – Dora de Pedery-Hunt, sculptor and coin and medal designer (d. 2008)
- November 21 – Stewart McLean, politician (d. 1996)
- December 7 – Donald C. MacDonald, politician (d. 2008)
- December 9 – Cynthia Chalk, photographer (d. 2018)
- December 12 – Clint Smith, ice hockey player and coach (d. 2009)
- December 16 – George Ignatieff, diplomat (d. 1989)
- December 23 – Frank Pierpoint Appleby, politician (d. 2015)
- December 27 – Elizabeth Smart, poet and novelist (d. 1986)

== Deaths ==
- March 7 – Pauline Johnson, poet, writer and performer (b. 1861)
- April 12 – Alexander Francis Macdonald, politician (b. 1818)
- April 23 – Richard William Scott, politician and Minister (b. 1826)
- May 4 – John M. Baillie, politician, member of the Nova Scotia House of Assembly (b. 1847)
- July 15 – Hugh Richardson, jurist (b. 1826)

== See also ==
- List of Canadian films
