= 1995 Nunavut capital plebiscite =

Canadian territorial referendum

- 11 December 1995
- Outcome: Iqaluit becomes the capital of Nunavut.

Results
Choice	Votes	%
Iqaluit	5,869	60.23%
Rankin Inlet	3,876	39.77%
Valid votes	9,745	99.11%
Invalid or blank votes	88	0.89%
Total votes	9,833	100.00%
Registered voters/turnout		79.00%

A plebiscite on a capital city was held on 11 December 1995 in the area of the Northwest Territories that was to be split off into the new territory of Nunavut. Voters were given the options of either Iqaluit or Rankin Inlet. Iqaluit was chosen by 60.23% of voters.

== Voting system ==
The plebiscite was run under the Northwest Territories Plebiscite Act and overseen by Elections Northwest Territories. The plebiscite was non-binding, and the results were to be taken by the Government of Canada's Minister of Indian Affairs and Northern Development, Ron Irwin, to the federal Cabinet.

== Results ==
Which of these communities do you want to become the Capital of Nunavut?

Choice	Votes	%
Iqaluit	5,869	60.23
Rankin Inlet	3,876	39.77
Invalid/blank votes	88	–
Total	9,833	100
Registered voters/turnout		79.00
Source: Direct Democracy

== See also ==
- List of Northwest Territories plebiscites
- List of Northwest Territories general elections
