= Gregory Charles =

Canadian writer

Gregory Charles OC
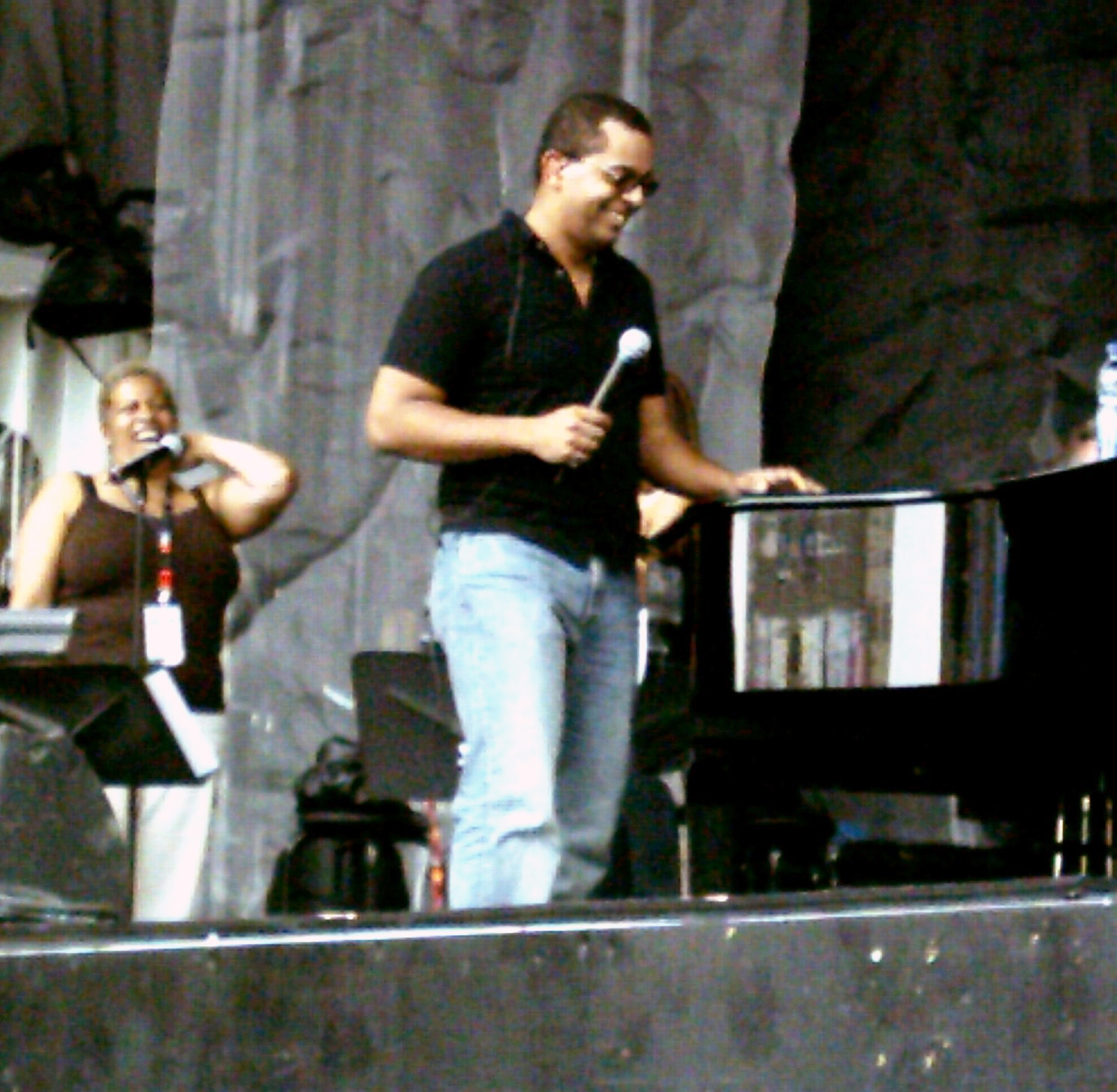
- Charles in Bedford, 2010
- Born: Gregory Nigel Charles; February 12, 1968 (age 58); Montreal, Quebec, Canada
- Occupations: Radio host, television host, classic singer, pianist, dancer, actor
- Website: www.gregorycharles.com

Gregory Charles OC (born February 12, 1968) is a Canadian performing artist of Trinidadian origin.

== Biography ==
Charles' father Lennox was a black anglophone of Trinidadian origin; his mother was a white francophone Canadian. Charles was born in Montreal, Quebec, was raised in Saint-Germain-de-Grantham and studied at École de musique Wilfrid-Pelletier in Montreal. At the age of 7, he won a category of the Canadian Music Competition, after which he performed with most of the country's symphonic orchestras. In 1979, he represented Canada at an international piano contest in Paris and at Carnegie Hall in New York. Charles was also a part of Petits-Chanteurs du Mont-Royal choir, which performs at the Saint Joseph's Oratory in Montreal and graduated from College Notre-Dame high school in Montreal as well. Shortly after entering law school in 1989, Charles obtained a television role which brought him to the attention of a wider public: that of Julien, a young student who comes to study in Montreal, in a TV show called Chambres en ville (Rooms in Town).He also co-hosted the show The Débrouillards alongside Marie-Soleil Tougas from 1990 to 1997.

Charles then became host of a daily radio show at the Montreal station CKOI-FM in 1991. The following year, he began hosting a television game show Que le meilleur gagne (May the Best Man Win) on Radio-Canada, for five years. In 1995, he began hosting a late night talk-show Cha-ba-da.

From 1998 to 2000, Charles worked on Céline Dion's world tour, mostly in the chorus but also as a pianist. The same year, as a singer Charles made the first of nine appearances at the Just for Laughs Festival in Montreal.

From 2000 to 2002, Charles was cast in the Canadian off Broadway hit two pianos four hands and toured in Canada and in the United States.

From 2001 to 2009, Charles has hosted a weekly radio show on the national Canadian Broadcasting Corporation/Radio-Canada network, and a series of television shows, such as Culture Choc and "Les Debrouillards", in French and English, and a variety show on TV5.

Charles was a conductor of the chœurs du nouveau monde (New World Choirs) which included notably Les Petits Chanteurs de Laval and Les Voix Boréales, he went on as conductor of the College Vocal, a youth choir that won international competitions in Indonesia, Malaysia, China, Italy and Germany.

Charles presented his first variety show, Noir et Blanc (Black and White) to more than 400,000 spectators across Quebec and the rest of Canada. He also performed at New York City's Beacon Theatre in 2004 and again in 2015. A unique feature of his show is the second half, in which he offers to sing and play on the piano and with his band any known song submitted randomly by the spectators.

At the end of 2004, Charles released his first album called Gospel Live Noir et Blanc. On October 16, 2006, he launched his album I Think of You, which sold 109,000 copies in its first week, making Charles the highest selling Canadian artist in a one-week period for the year 2006. It debuted at number 1 on the Nielsen SoundScan album chart. Charles sold more albums in 2006 than all other Canadian musicians except Nelly Furtado.

Charles was one of the headliners on Parliament Hill at the 2007 Canada Day celebration there, playing the evening's longest set, to an audience of thousands. He performed in English and French.

However, one of his next scheduled appearances in Ottawa, where audiences were required to pay, did not fare so well. According to reports in the Ottawa Sun, Doug Moore, the city's manager of Venture Properties, said that Grégory Charles' scheduled concert at the Ottawa SuperEx was cancelled due to poor ticket sales.

In the fall of 2007, Charles began hosting a CBC radio program, In the Key of Charles until September 6, 2009.

In April 2012, Charles did a one-year stint at the Cafe Carlyle in the famous Carlyle Hotel in New York City.

In December 2015, Charles acquired the two Radio-Classique radio stations, CJPX-FM in Montreal and CJSQ-FM in Quebec City, under the banner Groupe Musique Greg, pending approval by the Canadian Radio-television and Telecommunications Commission (CRTC). While financial details were not announced, the Journal de Montréal reported that he paid at least $10 million. The same year, Charles won the Martin Luther King Jr. Achievement Award for his musical achievements.

On June 30, 2016, Charles was appointed an Officer of the Order of Canada by Governor General David Johnston for "his infectious energy, creativity and dedication to ensuring that the performing arts and culture thrive in Canada and abroad."

From 2015 to 2019, Charles produced and hosted two youth oriented television programs for the French network of the cbc: virtuoses, a variety program dedicated to young classical musicians and crescendo, a show dedicated to high school students who perform with their school choirs.

In 2017, Charles founded an online music school called Gregory's Academy, where thousands of young and adult students learn music in an innovative way.

In 2019, Charles produced and hosted a series of television programs dedicated to the plight of immigrants who came from war stricken countries called le Vrai Nouveau Monde.

In 2020, Charles was on the first leg of a European tour when the pandemic hit. Shows in France were postponed. Later that year, Charles won the Félix for best instrumental album of the year at the gala de l’ADISQ for his album LEN. It was his 5th Félix. Charles is also the recipient of 5 "Gémeaux" awards for his work in television and one Artis award as youth personality of the year in television, back in 1995.

In 2021, Charles joined the cast of Star Academie on the TVA network. He reprised his role in 2022.

Charles is married to Nicole Collet, a Microsoft executive and is the father of one daughter, Julia, born in 2012.

In September 2022, there was mild controversy when a video of Prime Minister Justin Trudeau was circulated on social media singing Bohemian Rhapsody with Charles at the piano, while travelling to London for the funeral of Queen Elizabeth II

== Discography ==
GOSPEL LIVE EN NOIR & BLANC (2004)

1. "I'm on My Way"
2. "When I Rise"
3. "His lIttle Light Of Mine"
4. "Wade in the Water"
5. "Amazing Grace"
6. "Jesus I'll Never Forget"
7. "When I Rise (Reprise)"
8. "Gospel Hallelujah"
9. "I'M A Slave"

=== I Think of You (2006) ===
1. "I Think of You"
2. "Our House"
3. "I Put my Trust in You"
4. "Unlabel'ble"
5. "Promise That You Love Me"
6. "No Love"
7. "Your Love Will Lead Me Back to You"
8. "You are Near"
9. "Til the Day I Die"
10. "Life Goes On"
11. "Solo pienso en ti (Prima)" ("I think of You" – Spanish Version)

This album was certified 2× platinum in Canada in December 2006.

=== Loin de la lumière (2007) ===
1. "Au fond de moi"
2. "Mariko "On n'se comprend pas"
3. "Quand on se voit"
4. "Loin de la lumière"
5. "Chocolat"
6. "Sur ma peau"
7. "On sera deux"
8. "Tu as rejoint les anges"
9. "Elle était belle"
10. "Toi et moi"
11. "Je reviens"

=== Quand j'ai dit (2011) ===
1. "J'ai changé"
2. "Le goût"
3. "Qu'encore tu penses à moi"
4. "Quand j'ai dit"
5. "Heureux malheureux"
6. "J'ai oublié"
7. "Reste ce soir"
8. "Quand je veille"
9. "Jusqu'à la fin"
10. "Si tu dois"
11. "En t'attendant"

==== Charts ====
- CAN: #25
