= 1918 in Canada =

- Decades: 1890s; 1900s; 1910s; 1920s; 1930s
- See also: History of Canada; Timeline of Canadian history; List of years in Canada

Events from the year 1918 in Canada.

== Incumbents ==
=== Crown ===
- Monarch – George V

=== Federal government ===
- Governor General – Victor Cavendish, 9th Duke of Devonshire
- Prime Minister – Robert Borden
- Chief Justice – Charles Fitzpatrick (Quebec) (until 21 October) then Louis Henry Davies (Prince Edward Island) (from 23 October)
- Parliament – 13th (from 16 March)

=== Provincial governments ===
==== Lieutenant governors ====
- Lieutenant Governor of Alberta – Robert Brett
- Lieutenant Governor of British Columbia – Francis Stillman Barnard
- Lieutenant Governor of Manitoba – James Albert Manning Aikins
- Lieutenant Governor of New Brunswick – William Pugsley
- Lieutenant Governor of Nova Scotia – MacCallum Grant
- Lieutenant Governor of Ontario – John Strathearn Hendrie
- Lieutenant Governor of Prince Edward Island – Augustine Colin Macdonald
- Lieutenant Governor of Quebec – Pierre-Évariste Leblanc (until October 18) then Charles Fitzpatrick (from October 21)
- Lieutenant Governor of Saskatchewan – Richard Stuart Lake

==== Premiers ====
- Premier of Alberta – Charles Stewart
- Premier of British Columbia – Harlan Brewster (until March 1) then John Oliver (from March 6)
- Premier of Manitoba – Tobias Norris
- Premier of New Brunswick – Walter Foster
- Premier of Nova Scotia – George Henry Murray
- Premier of Ontario – William Hearst
- Premier of Prince Edward Island – Aubin Arsenault
- Premier of Quebec – Lomer Gouin
- Premier of Saskatchewan – William Melville Martin

=== Territorial governments ===
==== Commissioners ====
- Commissioner of Yukon – George Norris Williams (acting) (until April 1)
- Gold Commissioner of Yukon – George P. MacKenzie (from April 1)
- Commissioner of Northwest Territories – Frederick D. White (until September 27) then William Wallace Cory

== Events ==
- March 1 – Harlan Brewster, premier of British Columbia, dies in office
- March 6 – John Oliver becomes premier of British Columbia
- March 28 – April 1 – In the Easter Riots in Quebec City, the Militia suppress anti-conscription protesters. Four civilians are killed.
- March 30 – C Squadron of Lord Strathcona's Horse (Royal Canadians) conducts a cavalry charge against the Germans at Moreuil Wood. The squadron suffers atrocious casualties, but the action is one of the keys of halting the German advance in Operation Michael. Lieutenant Gordon Flowerdew will be awarded the Victoria Cross posthumously.
- April 21 – Canadian Captain Roy Brown (209 Squadron, RAF) supposedly shoots down the famed Red Baron. More accepted theories credit either Sergeant Cedric Popkin (Australian 24th Machine Gun Company), Gunner Snowy Evans or Gunner Robert Buie (both of 53rd Battery, 14th Field Artillery Brigade, RAA) with the kill.
- May 24 – Canadian women (except status Indians) obtain the right to vote in federal elections (even if they did not yet have the right to vote in provincial elections); some limited women's suffrage had been granted the year earlier. Status Indians gained federal suffrage in 1960.
- August 2 – The Vancouver general strike, the first general strike in Canada, triggered by the killing of Ginger Goodwin by police.
- August 8 – World War I: At the Battle of Amiens superior Canadian gunners assist a great allied breakthrough (also called Canada's 100 Days)
- August 26 – September 3 – Battle of Arras, 1918
- September – Canadian forces arrive in northern Russia to assist the White movement against the Bolsheviks in the Russian Civil War
- September 2–3 – Battle of Drocourt–Quéant Line. Seven Victoria Crosses will be awarded to Canadians for their valour on September 2.
- September 9–12 – Battle of the Hindenburg Line
- September 27 – October 2 – Battle of Canal du Nord
- October 8–9 – Battle of Cambrai (1918)
- October 10 – Two squadrons of the Canadian Light Horse charge the enemy at Iwuy, northeast of Cambrai. This was the last combat charge in the history of Canadian cavalry.
- October 26 – The Canadian Siberian Expeditionary Force arrives in Vladivostok to aid the White movement in the Russian Civil War
- November 1–2 – Battle of Valenciennes
- November 11 – The Armistice goes into effect, ending combat on the Western Front. Over 600000 Canadians fought in Europe: 70000 were killed and 173000 were wounded.
- December 4 – The lead elements of the Canadian Corps enter Germany.
- December 13 – The Canadian Corps parades across bridges over the Rhine, the 1st Division at South Bridge (Cologne) and the 2nd Division at Bonn. The Canadians participate in the Occupation of the Rhineland until gradually withdrawn starting in January 1919.

=== Full date unknown ===
- The Statistics Act is passed, creating the Dominion Bureau of Statistics
- Canada demands and receives – over the initial opposition of Britain, France and the United States – the right to participate in the Versailles Peace Conference and in the League of Nations.

== Sport ==
- March 30 – The Toronto Hockey Club win their first and only Stanley Cup by defeating the Vancouver Millionaires 3 game to 2. All games were played at Toronto's Arena Gardens

== Births ==
=== January to June ===
- January 12 – Mike Laffin, politician and dentist (d. 2019)
- January 18 - Gustave Gingras – notable physician and pioneer in physical medicine and rehabilitation (d. May 9, 1996).
- February 6 – Louis Dudek, poet, literary critic and publisher (d.2001)
- February 13 – Ross Whicher, politician and businessman (d.2002)
- February 22 – Sid Abel, ice hockey player and coach (d.2000)
- February 27 – Marcel Bourbonnais, politician (d.1996)
- March 15 – William McIntyre, Canadian Puisne Justice (d. 2009)
- April 2 – Marion Bryden, politician (d.2013)
- April 16 – Murray Westgate, actor (d. 2018)
- April 23 – Margaret Avison, poet (d.2007)
- May 1 – Raymond Mailloux, politician (d. 1995)
- May 15 – Saul Laskin, politician and 1st Mayor of Thunder Bay (d.2008)
- May 15 – Joseph Wiseman, actor (d. 2009)
- May 28 – Johnny Wayne, comedian and comedy writer (d.1990)
- June 10 – Barry Morse, actor (d.2008)
- June 23 – Madeleine Parent, labour activist, feminist, aboriginal rights activist (d. 2012)

=== July to December ===
- July 10 – Mary Geraldine “Bonnie” Baker (July 10, 1918 – December 17, 2003) – A prominent Canadian all-star baseball catcher in the All-American Girls Professional Baseball League and inductee into Canada's Sports Hall of Fame.
- July 15 – Bertram Brockhouse, physicist, shared the Nobel Prize in Physics in 1994 (d.2003)
- July 15 – Brenda Milner (née Langford), a British-Canadian neuropsychologist.
- July 18 – Nelson Mandela, one of only two honorary Canadian citizens
- August 5 – Betty Oliphant, ballet mistress, co-founder of the National Ballet School of Canada (d.2004)
- October 19 – Toddy Kehoe, politician and disability rights activist (d.2024)
- October 25 – Bobby Gimby, orchestra leader, trumpeter and singer-songwriter (d.1998)
- October 27 – Gérard Tremblay, Canadian Roman Catholic bishop (d.2019)
- November 13 – George Grant, philosopher, teacher and political commentator (d.1988)
- November 17 – Prosper Boulanger, politician and businessman (d.2002)
- November 19 – Lloyd Crouse, businessman, politician and Lieutenant Governor of Nova Scotia (d.2007)
- December 20 – Jean Marchand, trade unionist and politician (d.1988)
- December 30 – Al Purdy, poet (d.2000)

== Deaths ==
- January 1 – Anson Dodge, lumber dealer and politician (b.1834)

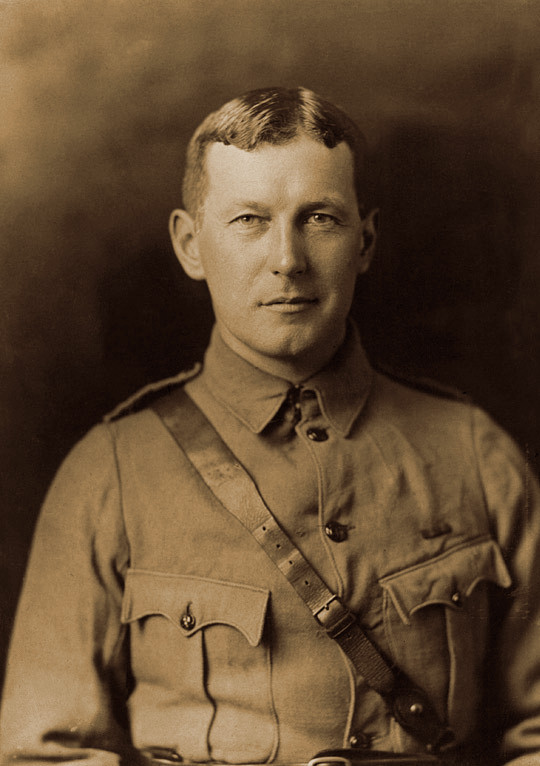
John McCrae in uniform, circa 1914

- January 28 – John McCrae, poet, physician, author, artist and soldier (b.1872)
- March 1 – Harlan Carey Brewster, politician and Premier of British Columbia (b.1870)
- March 21 – Henry Joseph Walker, politician and merchant (b.1849)
- April 9 – Charles Fleetford Sise, businessman (b.1834)
- August 18 – Henry Norwest, sniper in World War I (b.1884)
- September 21 — Emily Julian McManus poet, author, and educator (b.1865)
- October 11 – Wallace Lloyd Algie, Victoria Cross recipient (b. 1891)
- October 18 – Pierre-Évariste Leblanc, politician and Lieutenant Governor of Quebec (b.1853)
- November 11 – George Lawrence Price, last Commonwealth casualty of World War I (b.1898)
