= 2002 in Canada =

- Decades: 1980s; 1990s; 2000s; 2010s; 2020s
- See also: History of Canada; Timeline of Canadian history; List of years in Canada

Events from the year 2002 in Canada.

== Incumbents ==
Estimated Canadian population: 31,413,990

=== Crown ===
- Monarch – Elizabeth II

=== Federal government ===
- Governor General – Adrienne Clarkson
- Prime Minister – Jean Chrétien
- Chief Justice – Beverley McLachlin (British Columbia)
- Parliament – 37th

=== Provincial governments ===
==== Lieutenant governors ====
- Lieutenant Governor of Alberta – Lois Hole
- Lieutenant Governor of British Columbia – Iona Campagnolo
- Lieutenant Governor of Manitoba – Peter Liba
- Lieutenant Governor of New Brunswick – Marilyn Trenholme Counsell
- Lieutenant Governor of Newfoundland and Labrador – Arthur Maxwell House (until November 1) then Edward Roberts
- Lieutenant Governor of Nova Scotia – Myra Freeman
- Lieutenant Governor of Ontario – Hillary Weston (until March 7) then James Bartleman
- Lieutenant Governor of Prince Edward Island – Léonce Bernard
- Lieutenant Governor of Quebec – Lise Thibault
- Lieutenant Governor of Saskatchewan – Lynda Haverstock

==== Premiers ====
- Premier of Alberta – Ralph Klein
- Premier of British Columbia – Gordon Campbell
- Premier of Manitoba – Gary Doer
- Premier of New Brunswick – Bernard Lord
- Premier of Newfoundland and Labrador – Roger Grimes
- Premier of Nova Scotia – John Hamm
- Premier of Ontario – Mike Harris (until April 15) then Ernie Eves
- Premier of Prince Edward Island – Pat Binns
- Premier of Quebec – Bernard Landry
- Premier of Saskatchewan – Lorne Calvert

=== Territorial governments ===
==== Commissioners ====
- Commissioner of Yukon – Jack Cable
- Commissioner of Northwest Territories – Glenna Hansen
- Commissioner of Nunavut – Peter Irniq

==== Premiers ====
- Premier of the Northwest Territories – Stephen Kakfwi
- Premier of Nunavut – Paul Okalik
- Premier of Yukon – Pat Duncan (until November 30) then Dennis Fentie

== Events ==
=== January to March ===
- January 11 – Ford Motor Co. announces the closing of the truck assembly plant in Oakville, Ontario.
- January 14 – Industry Minister and Liberal leadership hopeful Brian Tobin announces that he is leaving politics.
- January 15 – Jean Chrétien shuffles the cabinet mostly to remove the scandal-tainted Alfonso Gagliano.
- January 18 – Walkerton Report released: it puts partial blame for the water tragedy on the provincial government.
- January 25 – Canada officially re-establishes diplomatic relations with Afghanistan.
- February 6 – Golden Jubilee of Elizabeth II's accession as Queen of Canada.
- February 18 – The towns of Chicoutimi, Jonquière and La Baie consolidated into a new city officially called Saguenay.
- March 4 – Federal government allows stem cell research using human embryos.
- March 7 – James Bartleman appointed Lieutenant Governor of Ontario.
- March 11 – Six children die when their home burns down in Quatsino, British Columbia.
- March 17 – The World Wrestling Federation holds WrestleMania X8 from SkyDome in Toronto, Ontario, drawing a crowd of 68,237.
- March 20 – Stephen Harper defeats Stockwell Day to become leader of the Canadian Alliance.
- March 23 – Ernie Eves is elected to replace Mike Harris as party leader at the Ontario Progressive Conservative leadership convention.
- March 26 – Supreme Court of British Columbia rules that works of the imagination are not child pornography.

=== April to June ===
- April 1 – The Canadian Air Transport Security Authority is established.
- April 15 – Ernie Eves becomes premier of Ontario, replacing Mike Harris.
- April 16 – The New York Sun, partially owned by former Canadian Conrad Black, is launched.
- April 17 – Tarnak Farm incident. Four Canadian infantrymen are killed, and eight injured, in Afghanistan by friendly fire from two U.S. F-16s, dropping a 230-kilogram bomb.
- May 5 – Hells Angels leader Maurice Boucher is convicted in Montreal of two counts of first-degree murder.
- May 7 – A court injunction is granted to Marc Hall, permitting him to bring a same-sex date to his high school prom.
- May 26 – Jean Chrétien shuffles the Cabinet again, removing Art Eggleton and Don Boudria, who were both embroiled in scandals.
- June 2 – Governor General Adrienne Clarkson, on the advice of Prime Minister Jean Chrétien, dismisses Finance Minister Paul Martin and replaces him with John Manley.
- June 5 – Alexa McDonough announces her resignation as leader of the federal New Democratic Party.
- June 7 – Quebec becomes the first province to grant homosexual couples full parental rights.
- June 26 – G8 leaders meet in Kananaskis, Alberta.

=== July to September ===
- July 14 – During Bastille Day celebrations, Jacques Chirac is saved from an assassination attempt by a Canadian tourist.
- July 23 – Pope John Paul II arrives in Toronto for World Youth Day.
- August 6 – Joe Clark announces decision to resign as leader of the Progressive Conservative Party of Canada.
- August 21 – Facing pressure from Martin loyalists Jean Chrétien announces he will step down as prime minister in February 2004.
- September – A Senate special committee recommends that marijuana should be legalized in Canada.
- September 9 – A riot breaks out at Concordia University in Montreal, by protesters against a scheduled talk by Israeli Prime Minister Ariel Sharon and Canadian Prime Minister Jean Chrétien; a Holocaust survivor and a rabbi are assaulted.

=== October to December ===
- October 4 – The Queen arrives in Canada to start of 12-day tour to mark her Golden Jubilee as Queen of Canada.
- October 7 – American officials deport Canadian citizen Maher Arar to Syria.
- October 29 – Canada issues a travel advisory for all those of Middle Eastern descent travelling to the United States.
- October 31 – Pat Buchanan calls Canada Soviet Canuckistan.
- October 31 – In Sauvé v. Canada (Chief Electoral Officer), the Supreme Court rules that all prisoners have the right to vote under Section Three of the Charter of Rights and Freedoms, regardless of the stipulation in the Canada Elections Act that prisoners serving sentences of two years or more may not vote.
- November 22 - The Sheppard Subway (Later renamed Line 4 Sheppard) opens on the Toronto Subway.
- November 26 – Françoise Ducros, the Prime Minister's communication director resigns over her comment that U.S. President George W. Bush is a "moron".
- November 28 – The Royal Commission on the Future of Health Care in Canada (the Romanow Commission) recommends a $15-billion infusion into the health care system.
- November 30 – Dennis Fentie becomes premier of Yukon Territory, replacing Pat Duncan.
- December 16 – Canada signs the Kyoto Accord, limiting greenhouse gas emissions.
- December 17 – The Service de police de la Ville de Québec arrest many people in a child prostitution bust that includes many well-known people of the city.

== Arts and literature ==
=== Art ===
- July 10 – At a Sotheby's auction, Peter Paul Rubens's painting "The Massacre of the Innocents" is sold for £49.5 million (US$76.2 million) to Canadian Kenneth Thomson.

=== New books ===
- Family Matters: Rohinton Mistry
- In Search of America: Peter Jennings
- The Last Crossing: Guy Vanderhaeghe
- Lucky Man: Michael J. Fox
- Paris 1919: Six Months That Changed the World: Margaret MacMillan
- Unless: Carol Shields
- Negotiating with the Dead, A Writer on Writing: Margaret Atwood
- Fences and Windows: Naomi Klein
- School Spirit: Douglas Coupland
- High Latitudes: An Arctic Journey: Farley Mowat

=== Awards ===
- October 22 – Yann Martel wins the Booker Prize for his novel Life of Pi
- November 5 – Austin Clarke wins the Giller Prize for his novel The Polished Hoe
- Margaret MacMillan wins the Samuel Johnson Prize for Paris 1919: Six Months That Changed the World
- Books in Canada First Novel Award: Mary Lawson, Crow Lake
- See 2002 Governor General's Awards for a complete list of winners and finalists for those awards.
- Geoffrey Bilson Award: Virginia Frances Schwartz, If I Just Had Two Wings
- Gerald Lampert Award:
- Griffin Poetry Prize: Christian Bök, Eunoia
- Marian Engel Award: Terry Griggs
- Matt Cohen Prize: Norman Levine
- Norma Fleck Award: Gena K. Gorrell, Heart and Soul: The Story of Florence Nightingale
- Pat Lowther Award:
- Stephen Leacock Award: Will Ferguson, Generica
- Timothy Findley Award: Bill Gaston
- Trillium Book Award English: Austin Clarke, The Polished Hoe and Nino Ricci, Testament
- Trillium Book Award French: Michel Ouellette, Le testament du couturier and Éric Charlebois, Faux-fuyants

=== Music ===
- Joni Mitchell wins a Grammy for lifetime achievement

==== New music ====
- A New Day Has Come: Céline Dion
- Let Go: Avril Lavigne
- Acoustic Kitty: John Mann
- Under Rug Swept: Alanis Morissette
- Vapor Trails: Rush
- Does This Look Infected?: Sum 41
- Up!: Shania Twain
- What If It All Means Something: Chantal Kreviazuk

=== Film ===
- Atom Egoyan's, Ararat is released.
- April 12 – Atanarjuat: The Fast Runner, first movie in Inuktitut, the language of the Inuit.

=== Television ===
- September 30 – CBC starts an uproar when it announces Ron MacLean will not be returning as host of Hockey Night in Canada. The CBC later agrees to MacLean's salary demands.
- Sesame Park, a Canadian spin-off of the American show Sesame Street, is cancelled due to low ratings, after more than three decades of airing on CBC Television.
- The CBC celebrates its 50th anniversary as a television broadcaster.

== Sport ==
- February 8 – February 24 – 2002 Winter Olympics in Salt Lake City, Utah. Canada wins gold for men's and women's hockey. Controversy erupts when Jamie Salé and David Pelletier are given only silver for the pairs' figure skating (later upgraded to gold after a judging controversy.
- May 26 – The Kootenay Ice win their only Memorial Cup by defeating Victoriaville Tigres 6 to 3. The tournament was played at Guelph Sports and Entertainment Centre in Guelph, Ontario
- November 23 – The Saint Mary's Huskies win their second (consecutive) Vanier Cup by defeating the Saskatchewan Huskies 33 to 21 in the 38th Vanier Cup played at Skydome in Toronto
- November 24 – The Montreal Alouettes win their fifth (and first since 1977) Grey Cup by defeating the Edmonton Eskimos 25 to 16 in the 90th Grey Cup played at Commonwealth Stadium in Edmonton

== Births ==
- February 4 – Graham Verchere, actor
- February 18 – Samuel Carson, football player
- April 6 – Andrea Botez, chess player
- May 10 – Sophia Ewaniuk, actress
- July 30 – Zachary Turner, murder victim (died 2003)
- September 6 – Leylah Fernandez, tennis player
- September 19 – Isaac Kragten, actor
- December 23 – Finn Wolfhard, actor

== Deaths ==
=== January to March ===
- January 4 – Douglas Jung, politician and first Chinese Canadian MP in the House of Commons of Canada (born 1924)
- January 5 – Christie Harris, children's author (born 1907)
- January 13 – Frank Shuster, comedian (born 1916)
- January 24 – Peter Gzowski, broadcaster, writer and reporter (born 1933)
- February 3 – Lucien Rivard, criminal and prison escapee (born 1914)
- February 14 – Bud Olson, politician, Minister and Senator (born 1925)
- February 26 – Harry Rankin, lawyer and politician (born 1920)
- March 12 – Jean-Paul Riopelle, painter and sculptor (born 1923)
- March 18
  - Dalton Camp, journalist, politician, political strategist and commentator (born 1920)
  - Johnny Lombardi, CHIN-TV television personality (born 1915)

=== April to June ===
- April 14 – Gustave Blouin, politician (born 1912)
- April 17 – Richard Green, soldier killed in Afghanistan (born 1980)
- April 19 – Ross Whicher, politician and businessman (born 1918)
- May 9 – Robert Layton, politician (born 1925)
- May 17 – Edwin Alonzo Boyd, criminal and leader of the Boyd Gang (born 1914)
- June 21 – Timothy Findley, novelist and playwright (born 1930)

=== July to December ===
- July 8 – Sidney Spivak, politician and Minister (born 1928)
- July 13 – Yousuf Karsh, photographer (born 1908)
- September 13 – George Stanley, historian, author, soldier, teacher, public servant and designer of the current Canadian flag (born 1907)
- November 24 – Harry Gunning, scientist and administrator (born 1916)
- November 30 – Jeffrey Baldwin, murder victim (born 1997)
- December 5 – Prosper Boulanger, politician and businessman (born 1918)
- December 10 – Les Costello, ice hockey player and Catholic priest (born 1928)
- December 13 – Zal Yanovsky, rock musician (born 1944)
- December 16 – Bill Hunter, ice hockey player, general manager and coach (born 1920)
- December 18 – Ray Hnatyshyn, politician and 24th Governor General of Canada (born 1934)

== See also ==
- 2002 in Canadian television
- List of Canadian films of 2002
