= 1998 in Canada =

- Decades: 1970s; 1980s; 1990s; 2000s; 2010s
- See also: History of Canada; Timeline of Canadian history; List of years in Canada

Events from the year 1998 in Canada.

== Incumbents ==
=== Crown ===
- Monarch – Elizabeth II

=== Federal government ===
- Governor General – Roméo LeBlanc
- Prime Minister – Jean Chrétien
- Chief Justice – Antonio Lamer (Quebec)
- Parliament – 36th

=== Provincial governments ===
==== Lieutenant governors ====
- Lieutenant Governor of Alberta – Bud Olson
- Lieutenant Governor of British Columbia – Garde Gardom
- Lieutenant Governor of Manitoba – Yvon Dumont
- Lieutenant Governor of New Brunswick – Marilyn Trenholme Counsell
- Lieutenant Governor of Newfoundland – Arthur Maxwell House
- Lieutenant Governor of Nova Scotia – James Kinley
- Lieutenant Governor of Ontario – Hillary Weston
- Lieutenant Governor of Prince Edward Island – Gilbert Clements
- Lieutenant Governor of Quebec – Lise Thibault
- Lieutenant Governor of Saskatchewan – Jack Wiebe

==== Premiers ====
- Premier of Alberta – Ralph Klein
- Premier of British Columbia – Glen Clark
- Premier of Manitoba – Gary Filmon
- Premier of New Brunswick – Raymond Frenette (until May 14) then Camille Thériault
- Premier of Newfoundland – Brian Tobin
- Premier of Nova Scotia – Russell MacLellan
- Premier of Ontario – Mike Harris
- Premier of Prince Edward Island – Pat Binns
- Premier of Quebec – Lucien Bouchard
- Premier of Saskatchewan – Roy Romanow

=== Territorial governments ===
==== Commissioners ====
- Commissioner of Yukon – Judy Gingell
- Commissioner of Northwest Territories – Helen Maksagak

==== Premiers ====
- Premier of the Northwest Territories – Don Morin (until November 26) then Goo Arlooktoo (November 26 to December 10) then Jim Antoine
- Premier of Yukon – Piers McDonald

== Events ==
=== January to March ===
- January 1 – Toronto and six other communities are merged to form a new megacity. Mel Lastman was sworn in as its first mayor. Three other Ontario cities were similarly merged on the same date in 2001.
- January 2 – Three separate avalanches in British Columbia kill a total of nine people.
- January 5 – The Ice Storm of 1998, caused by El Niño, strikes southern Ontario and Quebec, resulting in widespread power failures, severe damage to forests, and a number of deaths.
- January 6 – Alan Eagleson pleads guilty to fraud.
- January 7 – The federal government formally apologizes for the past mistreatment of First Nations.
- January 23 – The Royal Bank and the Bank of Montreal announce plans to merge, which are later scuttled by the federal government.
- February 6 – The Hudson's Bay Company takes over Kmart Canada, folding it into its Zellers chain.
- February 10 – Canadian National Railway merges with the Illinois Central.
- February 13 – Three girls, all under 18 years of age, are found guilty in Victoria, British Columbia, of killing 14-year-old Reena Virk. Three others plead guilty of assault.
- February 16 – Reference Re Secession of Quebec: The Supreme Court is asked to rule on the legality of unilateral Quebec secession.
- February 18 – Controversial plans to include a Holocaust memorial in the Canadian War Museum are scrapped.
- February 24 – In the federal budget, Finance Minister Paul Martin delivers a balanced budget.
- March 2 – Daniel Johnson, leader of the Quebec Liberal Party, announces his resignation.
- March 6 – The Dionne Quintuplets are given money and an apology by the Ontario government.
- March 6 – British Columbia doctors begin the first of a series of protests against funding shortages.
- March 12 – Quebec and Newfoundland resolve the long-running Churchill Falls dispute.
- March 12 – Mutual Life of Canada acquires MetLife to become Canada's second-largest insurance company.
- March 23 – Senator Andy Thompson is forced to resign his Senate seat after not attending for two years.
- March 24 – The Nova Scotia election leaves the Liberals and NDP tied for the most seats.
- March 27 – Jean Charest announces that he will seek the leadership of the Quebec Liberal Party.
- March 27 – The federal government agrees to compensate hepatitis C victims of tainted blood.

=== April to June ===
- April 1 – Floods in the Saguenay-Lac-Saint-Jean region of Quebec force 2000 from their homes.
- April 2 – In the final appeal of the Delwin Vriend case, the Supreme Court of Canada strikes down an Alberta Court of Appeal ruling that barred LGBT persons from protection under the province's human rights code.
- April 3 – Members of the Royal Newfoundland Constabulary are permitted side arms for the first time.
- April 17 – Dafydd Rhys Williams flies aboard the Space Shuttle Columbia, becoming the first non-American to serve as medical officer.
- April 17 – The Toronto Dominion Bank and the Canadian Imperial Bank of Commerce announce plans to merge; however, the merger is later blocked by the government.
- April 25 – The United States announces large tariffs on Canadian softwood lumber.
- April 26–28 – Prime Minister Chrétien pays an official visit to Cuba.
- May 1 – Separatist David Levine is named head of the newly amalgamated Ottawa hospital sparking great controversy.
- Early May – Wildfires burning in Alberta force the evacuation of a number of communities.
- May 14 – Camille Thériault becomes premier of New Brunswick, replacing Raymond Frenette.
- May 21 – The Federal Department of Fisheries and Oceans shuts down the B.C. coho fishery.
- May 29 – The Supreme Court strikes down a ban on pre-election opinion polls.
- June 9 – Three are killed in a gas explosion in Montreal, Quebec.
- June 10 – One person is killed by an explosion at an Irving Oil refinery.
- June 11 – Eleven are killed in a plane crash at Mirabel Airport.
- June 24 – Macmillan Bloedel says that it will end clear cutting of old growth forests.

=== July to September ===
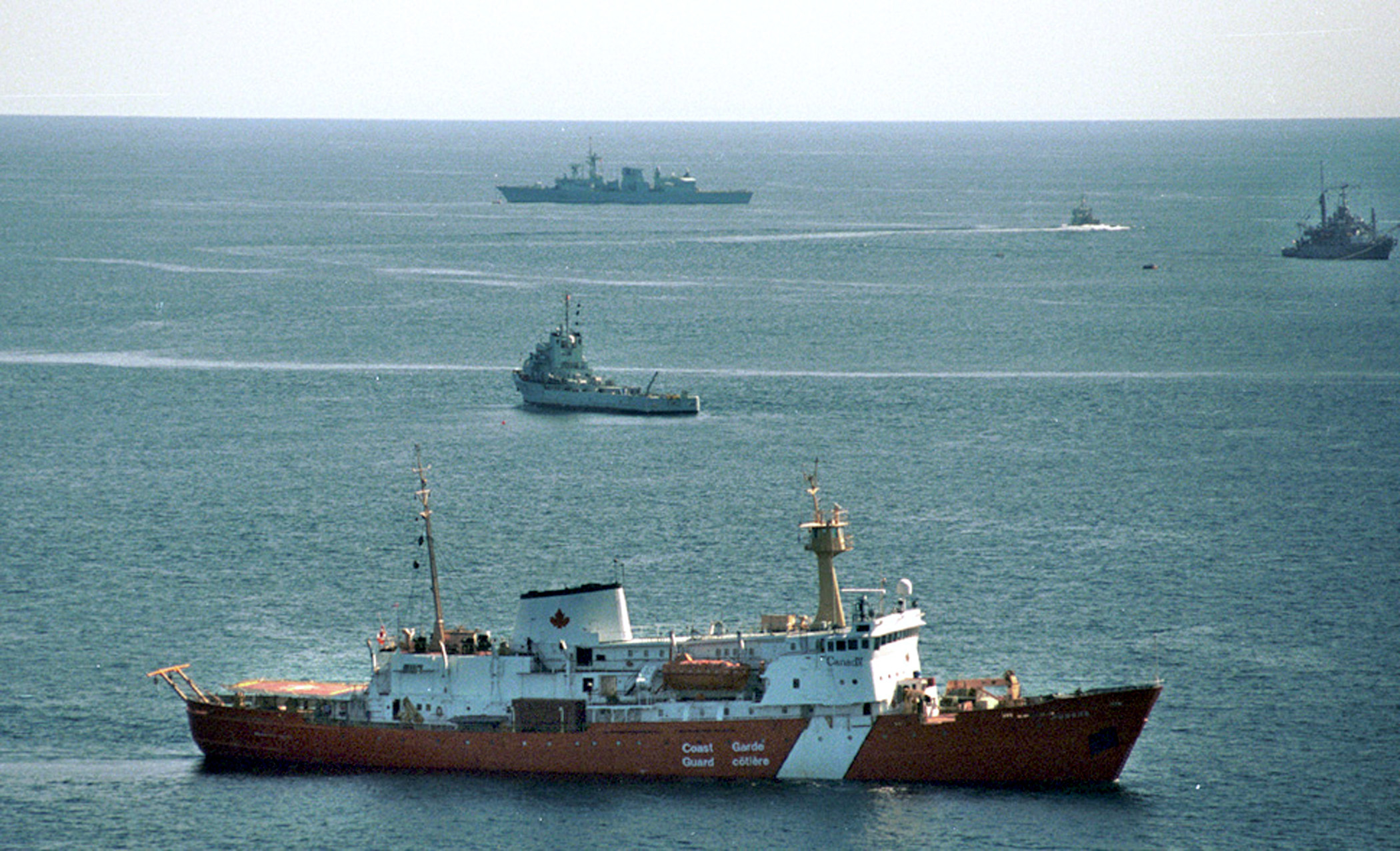
Canadian Coast Guard Ship Henry Hudson searches for Swissair Flight 111 debris following a crash off the coast of Peggys Cove, Nova Scotia.

- July 15 – The B.C. government and the Nisga'a First Nation sign a historic, and controversial, land claims agreement.
- July 20 – The Southam chain buys the Financial Post from Sun Media.
- August – The Canadian dollar plunges all month.
- August 11 – 8,000 people are evacuated as forest fires threaten Salmon Arm, British Columbia.
- August 20 – The Supreme Court of Canada states Quebec can not legally secede from Canada without the federal government's approval.
- August 28 – The dollar reaches 64.02 US cents.
- September 2 – Pilots for Air Canada launch the first strike in company's history.
- September 2 – Crash of Swissair Flight 111 off Peggys Cove in Nova Scotia.
- September 3 – A three-week lockout begins in Ontario's Catholic school system.
- September 22 – 20,000 protest Canada's new gun registry on Parliament Hill.

=== October to December ===
- October 8 – Canada is elected to a seat on the United Nations Security Council.
- October 14 – Canada's first diamond mine opens in the Northwest Territories.
- October 27 – Conrad Black's National Post publishes its first issue.
- November 14 – Former Prime Minister Joe Clark is selected as the new leader of the Progressive Conservative Party of Canada.
- November 26 – Don Morin is forced to resign as premier of the Northwest Territories.
- November 30 – In the Quebec election the Parti Québécois is re-elected despite narrowly losing the popular vote.
- December 1 – Work on Canada's new gun registry begins.
- December 10 – Jim Antoine becomes premier of the Northwest Territories, replacing Don Morin.
- December 14 – Minister of Finance Paul Martin prohibits Canada's banks from merging.
- December – The Military Police Complaints Commission is established.

== Arts and literature ==
=== New books ===
- The Bay of Love and Sorrows: David Adams Richards
- Greater Than Angels: Carol Matas
- The Love of a Good Woman: Alice Munro
- Prières d'un adolescent très très sage: Roch Carrier
- Broken Entries: Race Subjectivity Writing: Roy Miki
- Isaiah Berlin: A Life: Michael Ignatieff
- Coyotes Sing to the Moon: Thomas King
- Toronto Discovered: Robert Fulford
- Body Music: Dennis Lee
- The Colony of Unrequited Dreams: Wayne Johnston
- The Wise and Foolish Virgins: Don Hannah
- Kiss of the Fur Queen: Tomson Highway

=== Awards ===
- Carol Shields's Larry's Party wins the Orange Prize for Fiction
- Giller Prize for Canadian Fiction: Alice Munro: The Love of a Good Woman
- See 1998 Governor General's Awards for a complete list of winners and finalists for those awards.
- Books in Canada First Novel Award: Margaret Gibson, Opium Dreams
- Geoffrey Bilson Award: Irene N. Watts, Good-Bye Marianne
- Gerald Lampert Award: Mark Sinnett, The Landing
- Marian Engel Award: Sharon Butala
- Pat Lowther Award: Barbara Nickel, The Gladys Elegies
- Stephen Leacock Award: Mordecai Richler, Barney's Version
- Trillium Book Award English: André Alexis, Childhood and Alice Munro, The Love of a Good Woman
- Trillium Book Award French: Daniel Poliquin, L'homme de paille and Stefan Psenak, Du chaos et de l'ordre des choses
- Vicky Metcalf Award: Kit Pearson

=== Music ===
- Shania Twain's Come on Over is one of the year's top selling albums in North America
- Les Chansons en or by Céline Dion is released
- Supposed Former Infatuation Junkie by Alanis Morissette

=== Film ===
- Titanic, directed by Canadian James Cameron, wins 11 Oscars.

=== Television ===
- Canada's Sesame Street switches to showing exclusively Canadian content, renaming itself Sesame Park, as it no longer uses any American made segments from Sesame Street
- Canadian children's television show Rolie Polie Olie debuts.

=== Dance ===
- The French government names Karen Kain as an Officer of the Order of Arts and Letters

== Sport ==
- February 7 – February 22 – At the Nagano Olympics, Canada wins the fourth-most medals but is embarrassed when their star-filled hockey team fails to win a medal.
- February 12 – The Toronto Maple Leafs buy the Toronto Raptors
- May 17 – The Portland Winter Hawks win their second Memorial Cup by defeating the Guelph Storm 4 games to 3.
- June 16 – Cranbrook, British Columbia's Steve Yzerman of the Detroit Red Wings is awarded the Conn Smythe Trophy
- November 22 – The Calgary Stampeders win their fifth Grey Cup by the defeating the Hamilton Tiger-Cats 26 to 24 in the 86th Grey Cup played at Winnipeg Stadium. Vancouver's Vince Danielsen was awarded the game's Most Valuable Canadian
- November 28 – The Saskatchewan Huskies win their third Vanier Cup by defeating the Concordia Stingers 24 to 17 in the 34th Vanier Cup played at Skydome in Toronto

== Births ==
- January 9 – Sean Day, Belgium-born ice hockey player
- January 13 – Gabrielle Daleman, figure skater
- January 19 – Ella Shelton, ice hockey player
- February 3 – Michael McLeod, ice hockey player
- February 6 – Aviva Mongillo, singer and actress
- February 26 – Isaac Durnford, actor
- March 12 – Annaleise Carr, swimmer
- April 27 – Drake Batherson, ice hockey player
- May 20 – Nam Nguyen, figure skater
- July 23 – Houdini, rapper (died 2020)
- August 8 – Shawn Mendes, singer/songwriter
- August 13 – Carter Hart, ice hockey goaltender
- September 17 – Richard Wang, chess player
- October 26 – Mattea Roach, tutor and Jeopardy! contestant
- October 29 – Lance Stroll, race car driver
- November 13 – Melissa "Charlie" Storwick, singer-songwriter
- December 6 – Micah Berry, actor
- December 8 – Anastasia Rizikov, pianist
- December 30 – Zachary Brault-Guillard, Haiti-born Canadian soccer player

== Deaths ==
=== January to March ===
- January 1 – Arthur Gelber, philanthropist (born 1915)
- January 6 – Lotte Brott, cellist and music administrator (born 1922)
- January 12 – Mark MacGuigan, academic and politician (born 1931)
- January 23 – Donald Davis, actor (born 1928)
- January 28 – Eddie Sargent, politician (born 1915)
- February 1 – Sheila Watson, novelist, critic and teacher (born 1909)
- February 20 – Bob McBride, singer (born 1946)
- February 25 – W. O. Mitchell, writer (born 1914)
- March 13 – Bill Reid, artist (born 1920)
- March 16 – Yves Landry, president of Chrysler Canada

=== April to June ===
- April 3 – Elmer Iseler, choir conductor and choral editor (born 1927)
- April 7 – Nick Auf der Maur, journalist and politician (born 1942)
- April 16 – Marie-Louise Meilleur, supercentenarian, the oldest validated Canadian ever (born 1880)
- April 27 – John W. H. Bassett, publisher and media baron (born 1915)
- May 22 – Eddie MacCabe, sports journalist and writer (born 1927)
- May 23 – Grace Hartman, social activist, politician and first female mayor of Sudbury, Ontario (born 1900)
- May 28 – Phil Hartman, actor, comedian, screenwriter and graphic artist (born 1948)
- June 4
  - William Cecil Ross, politician (born 1911)
  - David Walsh, businessman, disgraced head of Bre-X (born 1945)
- June 20 – Bobby Gimby, orchestra leader, trumpeter and singer-songwriter (born 1918)
- June 27 – Joyce Wieland, experimental filmmaker and mixed media artist (born 1931)

=== July to September ===
- July 1
  - Emery Barnes, Canadian football player and politician (born 1929)
  - Florence Doane, Olympic athlete
- July 6 – Loris Russell, paleontologist
- July 16 – Lucien Lamoureux, politician and Speaker of the House of Commons of Canada (born 1920)
- July 27 – Muzz Patrick, ice hockey player and coach (born 1915)
- August 11 – Caro Lamoureux, soprano (born 1904)
- August 23 – Harold E. Johns, medical physicist (born 1915)
- September 15 – Louis Rasminsky, third Governor of the Bank of Canada (born 1908)
- September 28 – Eric Malling, television journalist (born 1946)

=== October to December ===
- October 1 – Pauline Julien, singer, songwriter, actress and feminist activist (born 1928)
- October 13 – Gérard Charles Édouard Thériault, general and Chief of the Defence Staff (born 1932)
- October 17
  - Brian Dickson, Supreme Court justice
  - Mary O'Brien, feminist
- November 9 – Roland Hewgill, actor
- November 13 – Michel Trudeau, student (born 1975)
- November 22 – Jack Shadbolt, painter (born 1909)
- December 7 – Marthe Létourneau, soprano and teacher (born 1916)
- December 9 – Shaughnessy Cohen, politician (born 1948)
- December 16 – John Gallagher, geologist and businessman (born 1916)
- December 23
  - David Manners, actor (born 1900)
  - Pierre Vallières, journalist and writer (born 1938)
- December 24 – Syl Apps, pole vaulter and ice hockey player (born 1915)

=== Full date unknown ===
- John Hayes, harness racing driver, trainer and owner (born 1917)
- Stanley Bréhaut Ryerson, historian, educator and political activist (born 1911)

== See also ==
- 1998 in Canadian television
- List of Canadian films of 1998
