= List of Northwest Territories plebiscites =

This is a list of territory wide plebiscites that have occurred in the Northwest Territories. Four plebiscites have occurred territory wide in the history of the Northwest Territories, although legislation was passed to allow a fifth plebiscite.

In 1974 the Legislative Assembly of the Northwest Territories passed a bill to authorize a plebiscite that would allow Northwest Territories communities the authority to control liquor. The bill received Assent from the Commissioner. The commissioner of the Northwest Territories at the time Stuart Milton Hodgson actively lobbied the Federal Government not to reject this step in Northwest Territories democracy. However, the plebiscite never took place: Hodgson ended up using his reserve powers to give an executive decree to allow Inuvik to halt liquor sales. This was the first time since 1898 that the Northwest Territories government tried to exert control over liquor in the territory.

In 1982 after considerable pressure from native groups and aboriginal Members, the Northwest Territories would try another plebiscite. This time they had the support of the Federal Government. In 1982 they held a plebiscite on dividing the Territory. The result would lead to three more plebiscites leading to the creation of Nunavut.

- 1982 Northwest Territories division plebiscite
- 1992 Northwest Territories jurisdictional boundaries plebiscite
- 1995 Nunavut capital plebiscite
- 1997 Nunavut equal representation plebiscite
