= Anne Stone (writer) =

Canadian writer, teacher, and editor

Anne Stone is a Canadian writer, teacher, and editor.

== Biography ==
Born in Toronto, Ontario, Stone now lives in Vancouver. She studied in Montreal at Concordia University, where she received a Bachelor of Arts in English Literature (1994) and at McGill University, where she earned a Master of Arts in English Literature (1997). Her thesis consisted of an experimental novel ("De'ath Sound") and a critical afterward; the short poetic novel, retitled Hush, was published by Insomniac Press in 1999. In 2005, Julie Boulanger wrote her thesis on this novel ("What Language is This?: A Study of Abjection in Djuna Barnes's Nightwood and Anne Stone's Hush.)

While set in Mississauga, it has been noted that her third novel, Delible (Insomniac Press, 2006), is reminiscent of the subject of missing women in Vancouver. Delible was named a book of the year by the Globe and Mail (29 Dec. 2007) and long-listed for the Relit Award. Together with activist and teacher Amber Dean, Stone co-edited a special issue of West Coast Line on the issue of murdered and missing women (2007). Between 2007 and 2010, Stone co-edited a fiction imprint at Insomniac Press (Serotonin/Wayside Editions). She teaches English and Creative Writing at Capilano University.

In 2000, Stone alleged that she ghostwrote the majority of Nega Mezlekia's award-winning memoir Notes from the Hyena's Belly. Mezlekia responded that Stone's role in the book's publication was strictly that of a copy editor, and sued Stone for defamation. Their claims and counterclaims became a significant subject of debate in the Canadian press about the relationship between authorship and editorship of a creative work.

== Bibliography ==
=== Novels ===
- jacks: a gothic gospel. DC Books, 1998. ISBN 978-0919688230
- Hush. Insomniac Press, 1999. ISBN 978-1895837582
- Delible. Insomniac Press, 2006. ISBN 978-1897178362

=== Selected Non-fiction ===
- What Will Not Bury. The Heart Does Break: Essays on Grief and Mourning by Canadian Writers. Eds. Jean Baird & George Bowering. Toronto: Randomhouse, 2009. ISBN 978-0-30735-702-1
- Bearing Partial Witness: Representations of Missing Women. Review of Education, Pedagogy and Cultural Studies (2009) 31:2: 221–236.
