= 1997 Nunavut equal representation plebiscite =

Canadian territorial referendum

A plebiscite on the equal representation of men and women in the Nunavut Legislative Assembly was held on 26 May 1997 in the area of the Northwest Territories that was to be split off into the new territory of Nunavut. The proposal was rejected by 57.37% of voters, with a voter turnout of just 38.9%.

== Results ==
Should the first Nunavut Legislative Assembly have equal numbers of men and women MLAs, with one man and one woman elected to represent each electoral district?

Choice	Votes	%
For	1,978	42.63
Against	2,662	57.37
Invalid/blank votes		–
Total	4,640	100
Registered voters/turnout	11,943	38.90
Source: Direct Democracy

== See also ==
- List of Northwest Territories plebiscites
- List of Northwest Territories general elections
