= Jean-Claude Lauzon =

Canadian filmmaker and screenwriter

- Lauzon in the 1990s
- Born: September 29, 1953; Montreal, Quebec, Canada
- Died: August 10, 1997 (aged 43); Kuujjuaq, Quebec, Canada
- Occupations: Filmmaker, screenwriter
- Years active: 1979–1997

Jean-Claude Lauzon (September 29, 1953 – August 10, 1997) was a Canadian filmmaker and screenwriter. Born to a working class family in Montreal, Quebec, Lauzon dropped out of high school and worked various jobs before studying film at the Université du Québec à Montréal. His two feature-length films, Night Zoo (1987) and Léolo (1992), established him as one of the most important Canadian directors of his generation. American film critic Roger Ebert wrote that "Lauzon is so motivated by his resentments and desires that everything he creates is pressed into the cause and filled with passion."

His film Léolo is widely considered to be one of the best Canadian films of all time. It was nominated for the Palme d'Or at the 1992 Cannes Film Festival, and was included on Time's list of the 100 greatest films that were released between March 3, 1923—when the first issue of Time was published—and early 2005, when the list was compiled.

Lauzon's career was cut short by his death in a plane crash in 1997 at the age of 43.

== Early life ==
Born to a working class family in Montreal, Quebec, Canada, Lauzon worked a variety of odd jobs after dropping out of high school. He went on to study film at the Université du Québec à Montréal at the behest of Andre Petrowski, a member of the National Film Board of Canada.

== Career ==
While studying at the Université du Québec à Montréal, Lauzon began experimenting with 16mm film stock. His first short film, titled Super Maire, won the Norman McLaren Award at the Canadian Student Film Festival in 1979. His second short film, titled Piwi, which he started working on while spending time at the American Film Institute in Los Angeles, won the Jury Prize at the Montreal World Film Festival in 1981.

In 1983, Lauzon wrote the first draft for his debut feature, Night Zoo, but spent most of the 1980s directing television commercials in Quebec and earning his pilot's licence. He eventually directed the film, making his feature-length film debut, and the film premiered in the Director's Fortnight at the Cannes Film Festival, where it was warmly received by most critics. The Globe and Mail’s Jay Scott wrote that “more than anything, Zoo is a movie of extremes; few films in the history of the cinema have wandered so successfully all over so much of the emotional map.” The film went on to win a record-breaking 13 Genie Awards in 1988, and won the Golden Reel Award for being the highest-grossing Canadian film of that year.

Lauzon achieved further success and acclaim with his second feature-length film, Léolo, which was nominated for the Palme d'Or at the 1992 Cannes Film Festival. Léolo won three Genie Awards and was a box office success in Canada and across Europe, but failed to make much of an impact in the U.S. upon release. Léolo has been called one of the best Canadian films of all time by various media outlets. It was included on Time's list of the 100 greatest films that were released between March 3, 1923—when the first issue of Time was published—and early 2005, when the list was compiled.

After the success of his first two films, Lauzon focused on directing commercials for television and spent most of his time in northern Quebec flying his Cessna 180 Skywagon, fishing, and hunting.

== Artistry ==
Playback wrote that Lauzon's films were "substantially autobiographical in nature". Collaborators described the director as "an extremely creative and intense personality for whom making films was painful." American film critic Roger Ebert wrote that "Lauzon is so motivated by his resentments and desires that everything he creates is pressed into the cause and filled with passion."

== Death ==
Lauzon was preparing his third feature-length film when he died, along with his girlfriend, Canadian actress Marie-Soleil Tougas, in a plane crash. On August 10, 1997, the Cessna 180 Skywagon that Lauzon was piloting flew into a mountainside in strong winds and rain near Kuujjuaq, Quebec while returning from a fishing trip. Lauzon was 43 years old when he died. He was buried in a private ceremony.

== Filmography ==
- Super Maire, 1979 - short film
- Piwi, 1981 - short film
- Night Zoo (Un zoo la nuit), 1987 - feature film
- Léolo, 1992 - feature film
