= Nega Mezlekia =

Ethiopian writer (born 1958)

Nega Mezlekia (Amharic: ነጋ መዝለቂያ; born 1958) is an Ethiopian writer who writes in English. His first language is the Amharic language, but since the 1980s he has lived in Canada so he speaks and writes in English.

Nega was born in Jijiga, the oldest son of Mezlekia, a bureaucrat in the Imperial government. Although initially supporting the revolution that deposed Emperor Haile Selassie, he grew strongly critical of the regime of Mengistu Haile Mariam. As a late teenager he abandoned his mother and siblings and set off with his best friend to join one of the armed rebel groups. In 1983 he left his position at Haramaya University to accept an engineering scholarship and study at Wageningen University. After two years in the Netherlands he was still unable to return home so moved to Canada instead. He has still never returned to Ethiopia.

He recounted his life story in his first book, Notes from the Hyena's Belly. Published in 2000, his book won the Governor General's Award for English language non-fiction that same year.

Mezlekia followed it up with the novel The God Who Begat a Jackal, which concerns an old Ethiopian myth. In 2006 his third book The Unfortunate Marriage of Azeb Yitades came out. Set in the period 1960 to 1990, it tells the tale of a small village in eastern Ethiopia struggling to maintain its identity and heritage as the modern world encroaches on its isolation. It was shortlisted as Best Book for the Commonwealth Writers’ Prize, 2007.

== Controversy ==
Shortly after Mezlekia's award win for Notes from the Hyena's Belly, poet and editor Anne Stone alleged that she had ghostwritten all but the final 20 pages of the book. While Mezlekia acknowledged that as a non-native speaker of English he needed some assistance in ensuring that his ideas made it to the page in correct English, he responded that the book was fundamentally his own and that Stone's role in the book's publication was strictly that of a copy editor, and sued Stone for defamation.

The resulting controversy led to considerable debate in the Canadian press, with most critics acknowledging that it can be extremely difficult to clearly determine how much of a role an editor can take in shaping a text before they should properly be credited as a coauthor. Several scholarly theses on the nature and limits of the author/editor relationship have cited the Mezlekia case.
