= 1996 Bloc Québécois leadership election =

Political party leadership election in Canada

- February 17, 1996
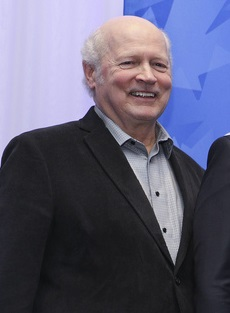

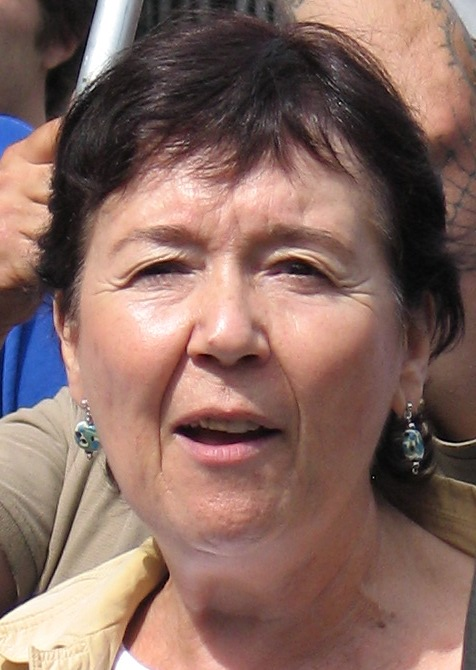
Candidate	Michel Gauthier	Francine Lalonde
Riding	Roberval	Mercier
Votes	104	51
Percentage	67.1%	32.9%
Leader before election
Gilles Duceppe (Interim)
Elected Leader
Michel Gauthier

1996 Bloc Québécois leadership election
- Date: February 17, 1996
- Resigning leader: Lucien Bouchard
- Won by: Michel Gauthier
- Ballots: 1
- Candidates: 2

The 1996 Bloc Québécois leadership election was the leadership election to replace Lucien Bouchard after he left the Bloc Québécois to become Premier of Quebec. Bloc MP Michel Gauthier won the election and became Leader of the Official Opposition. Gauthier's lack of profile resulted in some opposition parties mocking him as being the "faceless leader" of the opposition, as he was largely a political unknown in most of Canada and even in Quebec. His leadership was unpopular with the caucus due to alleged conservative views and his lack of "charisma or authority" when compared to Bouchard. Facing a revolt by his MPs, which culminated in the leaking of confidential caucus discussions, Gauthier resigned in March 1997.

== Candidates ==
Name	Background	Ref.
Michel Gauthier	MP for Roberval—Lac-Saint-Jean (1994–2007); Joined party on October 25, 1993	
Francine Lalonde	MP for Mercier (1993–2004); Joined party on October 25, 1993	

== Result ==
First Ballot
Candidate	Votes	Percentage
Michel Gauthier	104	67.1%
Francine Lalonde	51	32.9%
Total	155	100%
