= Helaina Cyr =

Canadian wheelchair basketball player

Personal information
- Born: September 5, 1996 (age 30) Edmonton, Alberta
- Listed height: 5 ft 2 in (1.57 m)

Career history
- Edmonton Inferno
- Alberta Juniors
Medals
Athletics
Women's CWBL National Championships
Silver medal – second place	2010	Women's wheelchair basketball
Silver medal – second place	2011	Women's wheelchair basketball

Helaina Cyr (born September 5, 1996) is a Canadian Paralympic wheelchair basketball player from Edmonton, Alberta.

== Biography ==
Cyr was born on September 5, 1996, in Edmonton, Alberta. She began playing wheelchair basketball for Alberta Northern Lights in September 2005 along with her brother Caleb. In 2010 and 2011 Women's CWBL National Championships she won 2 silver medals.
