= Mary-Lynn Neil =

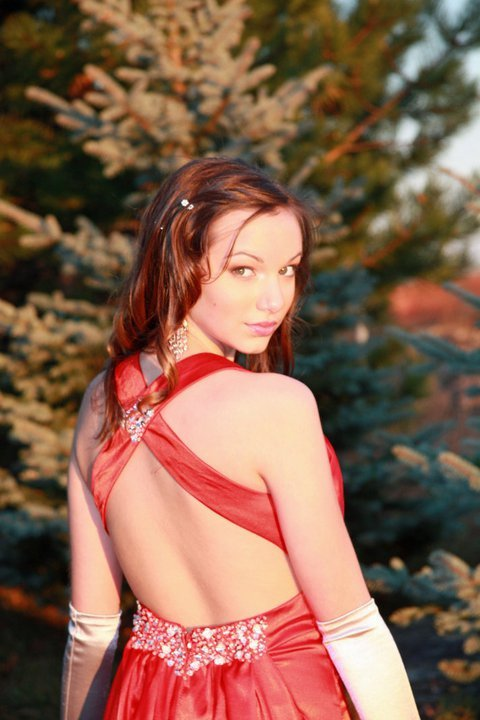

Background information
- Born: June 18, 1997 (age 28); Kingston, Ontario, Canada
- Genres: Country
- Occupations: Singer, songwriter, model
- Instruments: Guitar, Piano

Mary-Lynn Elizabeth Neil (born June 18, 1997) is a singer, songwriter and model from Kingston, Ontario, Canada. At the age of 10 she was discovered by Brian Dolph, of Cafe Music Group, at a singing competition in Consecon, Ontario, in 2008.

Neil's first single, "A Daughter's Prayer", was written for her father, Master-Corporal Mike Neil, when he was serving with the Canadian Armed Forces in Afghanistan. The song was written as a poem in her journal in January, 2009, and was turned into a song when her mother, Donna Neil, recognized the message in the lyrics. "A Daughter's Prayer" was recorded in Nashville, Tennessee through Cafe Music Group, and the vocals were done at Longshot Studio in Kingston, Ontario. Mary-Lynn was 12 at the time.

"A Daughter's Prayer" received air play in 26 countries. It helped to draw attention to the sacrifice made by military families, and the children in particular. It continues to be played for Remembrance Day, Memorial Day, and ANZAC Day.

Her second release, from November 2010, was a Christmas song called "I Want A Boy For Christmas". The song was, once again, recorded in Nashville, and combined a number of styles and genres to appeal to a wide demographic of listeners. It was an industry top 10 DMDS download, and was another hit song for the young artist.

Mary-Lynn was asked to be a part of Canadian Icon, Wayne Rostad's, Christmas in the Valley Tour, October–December, 2010.

In 2010, having just turned 13, Mary-Lynn was acknowledged as the youngest professional member of the Canadian Country Music Association.
