= Albert Sanschagrin =

Albert Sanschagrin, O.M.I.
- Bishop of Saint-Hyacinthe
- Church: Roman Catholic Church
- See: Saint-Hyacinthe
- In office: 1967-79
- Predecessor: Bishop Arthur Douville
- Successor: Bishop Louis-de-Gonzague Langevin, M. Afr.
- Previous post(s): Bishop

Orders
- Ordination: 1936

Personal details
- Born: August 5, 1911; Saint-Tite, Quebec, Canada
- Died: April 2, 2009 (aged 97); Saint-Hyacinthe, Quebec, Canada

Albert Sanschagrin, O.M.I. (August 5, 1911 – April 2, 2009) was Bishop Emeritus of Saint-Hyacinthe, Quebec, Canada, and the oldest Canadian bishop of the Roman Catholic Church at the time of his death.

== Biography ==
He was ordained a priest in the order of the Oblates of Mary Immaculate on May 24, 1936. He was appointed Auxiliary Bishop of Amos, Quebec, Canada on August 12, 1957. He was ordained Bishop of Bagis on September 14, 1957. He was appointed Bishop of Saint-Hyacinthe, Quebec on June 13, 1967. He retired on July 18, 1979.
