= Chase Wouters =

Canadian ice hockey player (born 2000)

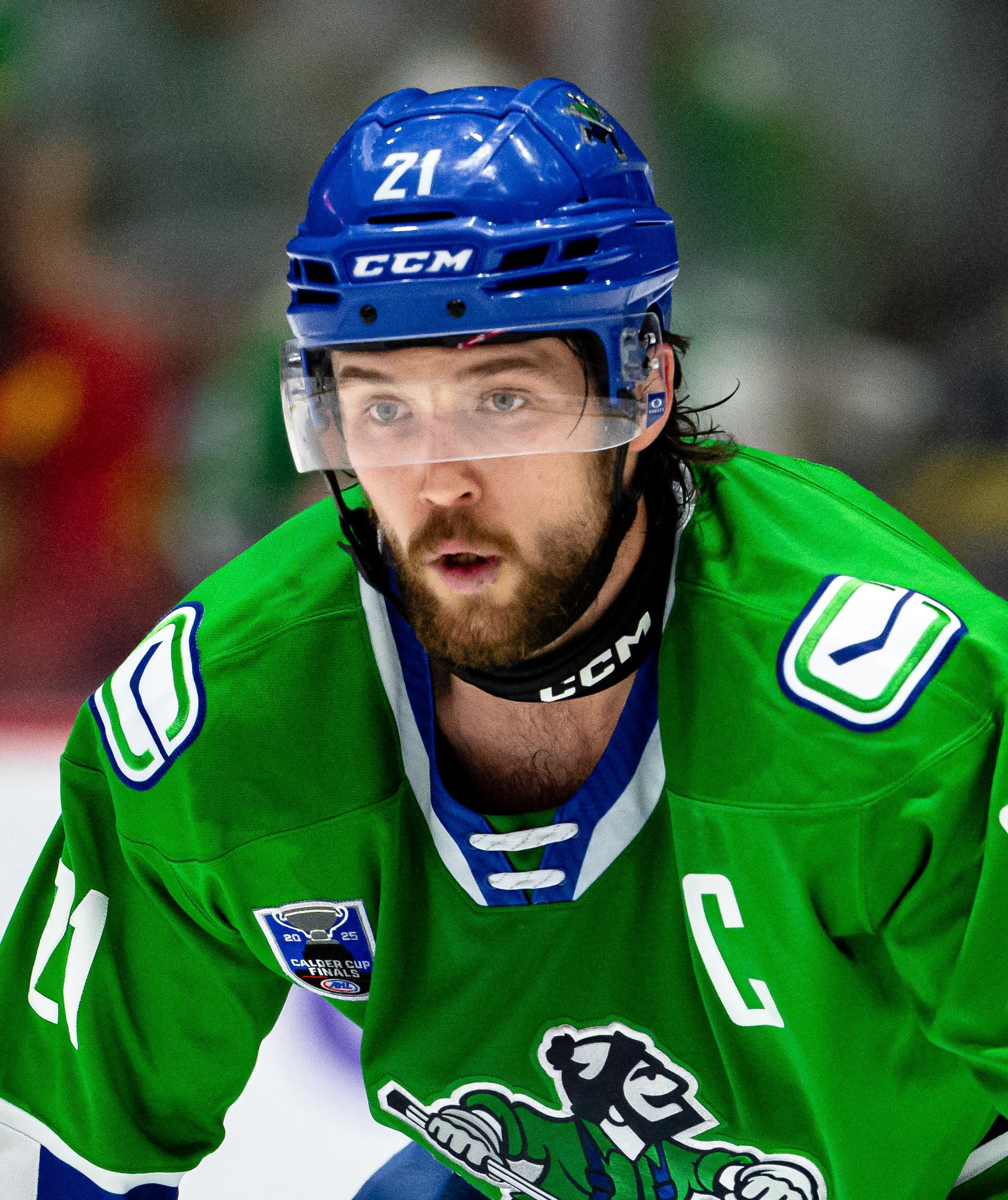
- Wouters with the Abbotsford Canucks in the 2025 Calder Cup Finals
- Born: February 8, 2000 (age 26) North Battleford, Saskatchewan, Canada
- Height: 6 ft 0 in (183 cm)
- Weight: 182 lb (83 kg; 13 st 0 lb)
- Position: Centre
- Shoots: Right
- NHL team (P) Cur. team: Vancouver Canucks; Abbotsford Canucks (AHL)
- NHL draft: Undrafted
- Playing career: 2021–present

Chase Wouters (born February 8, 2000) is a Canadian professional ice hockey centre and captain for the Abbotsford Canucks of the American Hockey League (AHL) playing under contract to the Vancouver Canucks of the National Hockey League (NHL). Before turning professional, Wouters spent six years playing for the Saskatoon Blades. The team retired his jersey upon the conclusion of his major junior career in 2021.

== Early life ==
Wouters was born on February 8, 2000, in North Battleford, Saskatchewan, Canada. He began skating at the age of four after being inspired by his father and older sister.

== Playing career ==
=== Amateur ===
Growing up, Wouters played two seasons of minor hockey for the Lloydminster Heat U15 AAA team from 2013 to 2015. In his final season with the team, he was named captain and was called up to the U16 AAA Rage team seven times. Following the 2014–15 season, Wouters was drafted by the Saskatoon Blades in the first round of the 2015 Western Hockey League (WHL) Bantam Draft. After representing Team Northeast at the 2015 Alberta Cup, Wouters was selected to play for Team Alberta at the 2015 Western Canada U16 Challenge Cup. Wouters played the majority of the 2015–16 season with the Lloydminster U18 AAA Bobcats and helped them reach the 2016 Telus Cup. He also played two games with the Saskatoon Blades at the end of their season. Over the summer, Wouters was also invited to participate in Team Canada's national U-17 development camp.

=== Major junior ===
Wouters recorded 21 points in his rookie season with the Blades before greatly improving the following year. During the 2017–18 season, Wouters earned more on-ice responsibility and centered a line with Braylon Shmyr and Josh Paterson. His efforts also earned him attention from the NHL Central Scouting Bureau, who ranked him as a "C" prospect on their October and November "players to watch" list. Wouters finished the season with a career-high 51 points and received the Saskatoon Blades "Hardest Working Player" award. He finished the season ranked 92nd amongst all North American skaters eligible for the 2018 NHL entry draft. Wouters was also named the Eastern Conference Scholastic Player of the Year due to his academic accomplishments. In April, Wouters was invited to Team Canada's roster for the 2018 IIHF World U18 Championships.

Despite going undrafted in his first year of eligibility, Wouters was invited to participate in the Tampa Bay Lightning's 2018 training camp. Upon returning to the Blades, Wouters was named the 59th captain in franchise history. As he remained undrafted, Wouters was invited to participate in the Anaheim Ducks 2019 training camp. Upon rejoining the Blades, Wouters scored 10 goals and seven assists through his first 18 games. As such, he was named to Team WHL for the annual CHL Canada/Russia Series. Wouters finished the regular season with 15 goals and 24 assists to help the Blades qualify for the 2019 WHL playoffs. He scored a goal in overtime of Game 1 to lead the Blades over the Moose Jaw Warriors.

Wouters spent six years playing for the Saskatoon Blades, scoring 181 points in 280 games. The team retired his jersey upon the conclusion of his major junior career.

=== Professional ===
Wouters concluded his WHL career on July 22, 2021, by signing a professional contract with the Abbotsford Canucks of the American Hockey League (AHL). He scored his first professional goal and assist with the Canucks on November 15, 2021 against the San Jose Barracuda. Wouters finished his rookie season with five goals and 13 assists for 18 points over 60 games. He also led the team in plus-minus stats and received their Unsung Hero Award. Following his rookie season, Wouters signed a two-year contract extension with the Canucks.

Before the start of the 2022–23 season, Wouters was appointed the first captain in franchise history. Wouters recorded his first professional multi-goal game on December 31, 2022, against the Manitoba Moose.

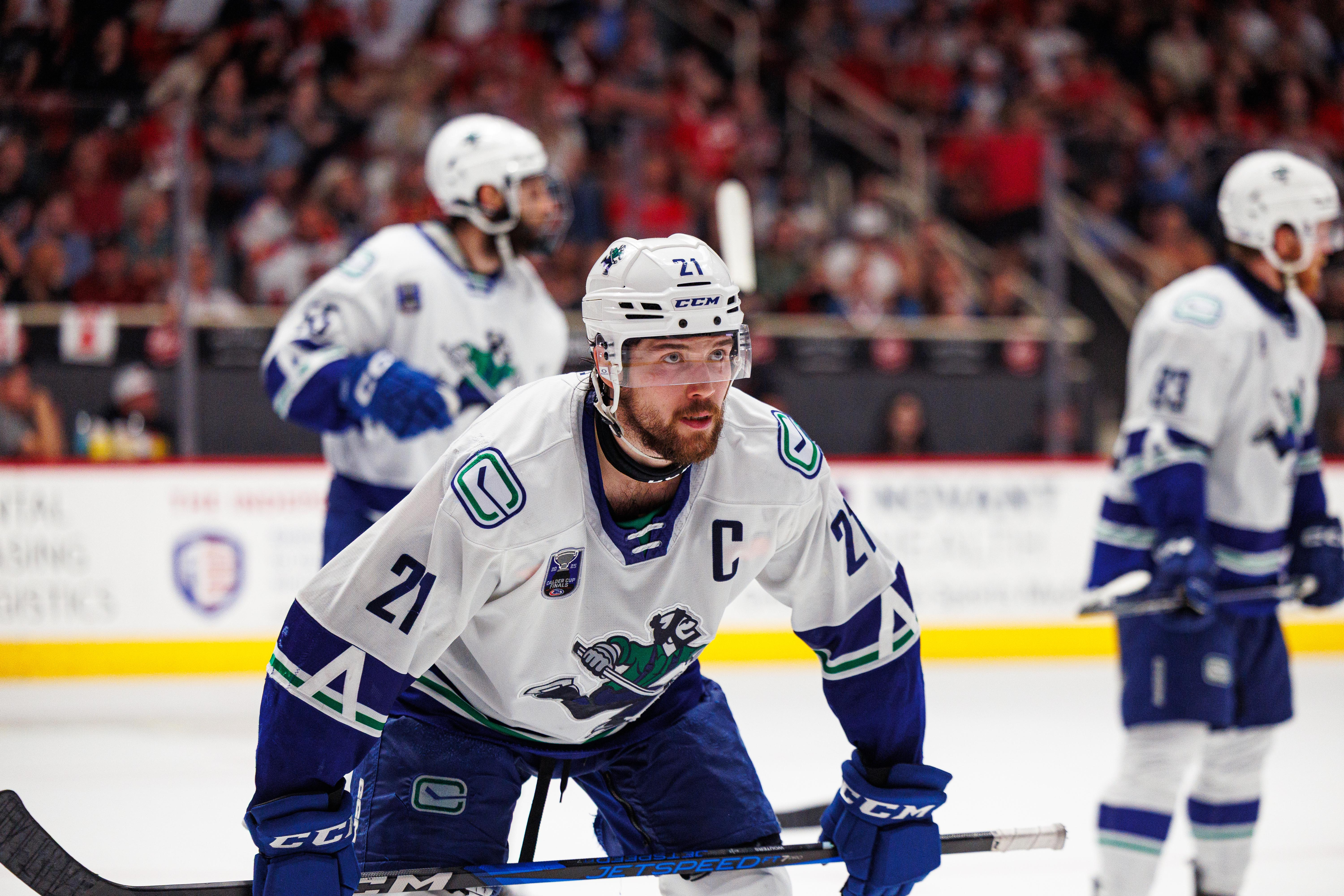
Wouters in Game 6 of the 2025 Calder Cup Finals.

Wouters signed a professional tryout agreement with the Vancouver Canucks but was reassigned to the Abbotsford Canucks before the start of the 2023–24 season. He helped the Canucks reach the 2024 Calder Cup playoffs and scored the series winning goal against the Colorado Eagles to advance them to the second round. On June 19, Wouters signed a two-year contract extension with the Canucks through the end of the 2025–26 season. He was also named the Abbotsford Canucks Man of the Year for the second consecutive season.

The Canucks began the 2024–25 season on a four-game road trip. While on the road trip, Wouters played in his 200th career AHL game and became the first person in franchise history to play all 200 games with the Canucks. Later that month, Wouters scored the first penalty shot goal in franchise history in a 4–1 loss to the San Diego Gulls. He recorded a career-high 10 goals as he helped the Canucks set a franchise record 13-game win streak to end the season. Wouters finished the regular season with 28 points and was named the Abbotsford Canucks Man of the Year for the third consecutive season. He helped the Canucks advance to the Calder Cup Finals for the first time in franchise history. On 23 June 2025, Wouters led his team to a Calder Cup championship, defeating the Charlotte Checkers in six games.

Following his first five seasons under AHL contract, Wouters was signed to his first NHL deal after agreeing to a one-year, two-way contract with the Vancouver Canucks on June 18, 2026.

== Career statistics ==
=== Regular season and playoffs ===
			Regular season					Playoffs
Season	Team	League	GP	G	A	Pts	PIM	GP	G	A	Pts	PIM
2015–16	Lloydminster Bobcats	AMHL	31	8	13	21	16	10	5	2	7	2
2015–16	Saskatoon Blades	WHL	2	0	0	0	0	—	—	—	—	—
2016–17	Saskatoon Blades	WHL	54	6	15	21	27	—	—	—	—	—
2017–18	Saskatoon Blades	WHL	72	18	33	51	39	—	—	—	—	—
2018–19	Saskatoon Blades	WHL	68	15	24	39	61	10	2	4	6	0
2019–20	Saskatoon Blades	WHL	63	26	22	48	59	—	—	—	—	—
2020–21	Saskatoon Blades	WHL	21	10	12	22	31	—	—	—	—	—
2021–22	Abbotsford Canucks	AHL	60	5	13	18	62	2	0	0	0	5
2022–23	Abbotsford Canucks	AHL	70	8	17	25	61	6	0	1	1	4
2023–24	Abbotsford Canucks	AHL	66	9	14	23	50	6	2	1	3	12
2024–25	Abbotsford Canucks	AHL	72	10	18	28	67	24	2	3	5	12
2025–26	Abbotsford Canucks	AHL	70	11	15	26	76	—	—	—	—	—
AHL totals			338	43	77	120	316	38	4	5	9	33

=== International ===
Year	Team	Event	Result	GP	G	A	Pts	PIM
2016	Canada Black	WHC-17	2nd place, silver medalist(s)	6	2	1	3	0
2018	Canada	U18	5th	5	2	1	3	2
Junior totals				11	4	2	6	2

== Awards and honours ==
Award	Year	Ref
WHL
Eastern Conference Scholastic Player of the Year	2018	
AHL
Calder Cup Champion	2025	
Abbotsford Canucks
Man Of The Year	2023, 2024, 2025	
