= Marie-Soleil Tougas =

Canadian actress (1970–1997)

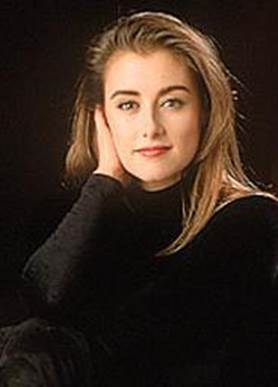
- Born: May 3, 1970; Mont-Saint-Hilaire, Québec
- Died: August 10, 1997 (aged 27); Kuujjuaq, Québec, Canada
- Occupations: Actress; TV host
- Years active: 1978 - 1997

Marie-Soleil Tougas (May 3, 1970 – August 10, 1997) was an actress and TV host based in Quebec, Canada.

== Biography ==
=== Television career ===
She began her career as a teenager in the role of Zoe in the soap opera Peau de banane, then continued as a young adult in Chop suey, Chambres en ville, Ent'Cadieux and Jasmine.

She also co-hosted the show Fort Boyard (with Guy Mongrain) and The Débrouillards alongside Gregory Charles. She appeared in numerous advertising campaigns including a campaign for condom use as well as those of Toyota dealers. She was well known as a spokesperson for the Éduc'alcool organization, promoting responsible alcohol consumption, for her involvement in the cause of disabled children, and as a spokesperson for Operation Enfant Soleil and host of the annual telethon of the foundation.

=== Plane crash ===
She died with her boyfriend Jean-Claude Lauzon when their plane crashed near Ungava Bay in northern Quebec on August 10, 1997. Patrice L'Écuyer and Gaston Lepage, who followed them in another plane, were the first to see the accident. The funerals were broadcast on TVA.
