= Czeslaw Brzozowicz =

Engineer

Czeslaw Peter Brzozowicz (June 28, 1911 - November 24, 1997) was a consulting engineer for the CN Tower, Toronto-Dominion Centre, first Toronto subway line, among many other construction projects in Canada.

== Biography ==
Born in Sokolow Malopolski, Poland, in 1911, Brzozowicz graduated in civil engineering from the University of Lwow in Poland only months before the Nazi invasion of Poland. He served with the Polish army in Poland and France for three years before obtaining a Canadian visa in 1942 under an agreement with the government-in-exile to send engineers for Canada's war industries. Like many immigrants, he arrived in Canada with a few dollars and his professional training. His first job was as a surveyor, laying out the highway between Prince George and Prince Rupert in British Columbia. In 1944, Brzozowicz joined Marathon Paper Mills in Toronto, designing their Northern Ontario plants. At the end of the war, sensing Canada was about to boom, he launched a private practice as a consulting engineer. His first client was Canadian Breweries Ltd., whose expansion plans - typical for the time - called for several reinforced concrete structures in Toronto, Waterloo, Windsor and Montreal.

Brzozowicz made a name for himself designing concrete structures reinforced with embedded steel bars. It was a relatively uncommon practice in Canada, since the short construction season was considered unfavourable for poured concrete walls. In this respect, Brzozowicz was at the forefront of an engineering trend that would become enormously popular.

Brzozowicz designed grain elevators and other industrial structures in Toronto, Winnipeg and Montreal. Working with Pigott Construction, he contributed to such Canadian landmarks as the A.V. Roe aircraft facility and one of the world's largest automobile factories, General Motors' Autoplex in Oshawa, Ontario. Brzozowicz also consulted extensively on Toronto's first subway line, which ran under Yonge Street from Union Station to Eglinton Avenue. C.P. Brzozowicz Ltd. supplied engineering expertise for the construction of the Commonwealth's tallest building in the 1960s, Mies van der Rohe's Toronto-Dominion Bank Tower. His expertise was also used in the design of the world's first tower with a revolving restaurant, the Skylon Tower in Niagara Falls, Ontario. He was later involved in the crucial shoring of the CN Tower, the world's 9th tallest freestanding structure - and one made of reinforced concrete.

== Personal life ==
Brzozowicz was married to his wife Danuta for 48 years, and together they raised three daughters and three sons, dividing their time between their north Toronto home, a ramshackle cottage on Georgian Bay and an apple farm near Collingwood, Ontario. He made sure each of his children received a traditional Catholic education.

The Brzozowicz family home was one of the more than 700 projects designed by Brzozowicz's firm in his lifetime, dressed in warm red brick, and built in 1957. Brzozowicz died of pneumonia in Toronto in 1997. It serves as a legacy to the man that when the family home was sold and demolished some 10 years after his passing, the stoutly built residence proved difficult to raze.
