= 2012 in Canada =

- Decades: 1990s; 2000s; 2010s; 2020s
- See also: History of Canada; Timeline of Canadian history; List of years in Canada

Events from the year 2012 in Canada.

== Incumbents ==
=== Crown ===
- Monarch – Elizabeth II

=== Federal government ===
- Governor General – David Johnston
- Prime Minister – Stephen Harper
- Chief Justice – Beverley McLachlin (British Columbia)
- Parliament – 41st

=== Provincial governments ===
==== Lieutenant governors ====
- Lieutenant Governor of Alberta – Donald Ethell
- Lieutenant Governor of British Columbia – Steven Point (until November 2) then Judith Guichon
- Lieutenant Governor of Manitoba – Philip S. Lee
- Lieutenant Governor of New Brunswick – Graydon Nicholas
- Lieutenant Governor of Newfoundland and Labrador – John Crosbie
- Lieutenant Governor of Nova Scotia – Mayann Francis (until April 12) then John James Grant
- Lieutenant Governor of Ontario – David Onley
- Lieutenant Governor of Prince Edward Island – Frank Lewis
- Lieutenant Governor of Quebec – Pierre Duchesne
- Lieutenant Governor of Saskatchewan – Gordon Barnhart (until March 22) then Vaughn Solomon Schofield

==== Premiers ====
- Premier of Alberta – Alison Redford
- Premier of British Columbia – Christy Clark
- Premier of Manitoba – Greg Selinger
- Premier of New Brunswick – David Alward
- Premier of Newfoundland and Labrador – Kathy Dunderdale
- Premier of Nova Scotia – Darrell Dexter
- Premier of Ontario – Dalton McGuinty
- Premier of Prince Edward Island – Robert Ghiz
- Premier of Quebec – Jean Charest (until September 19) then Pauline Marois
- Premier of Saskatchewan – Brad Wall

=== Territorial governments ===
==== Commissioners ====
- Commissioner of Yukon – Doug Phillips
- Commissioner of Northwest Territories – George Tuccaro
- Commissioner of Nunavut – Edna Elias

==== Premiers ====
- Premier of the Northwest Territories – Bob McLeod
- Premier of Nunavut – Eva Aariak
- Premier of Yukon – Darrell Pasloski

== Events ==
=== January to March ===
- January 1 – The Quebec Sales Tax (QST) rises one percentage point to 9.5%.
- January 10 – MP for Saint-Maurice—Champlain, the NDP's Lise St-Denis, crosses the floor to join the Liberal caucus.
- January 29 – A guilty verdict in the trial of the Shafia family murders is returned.
- February 4
  - The Syrian Embassy in Ottawa is vandalized as it was sprayed with red paint.
  - An imam issues a fatwa condemning honour killings and domestic violence, in reaction to the Shafia family murder guilty verdict.
- February 6 – Diamond Jubilee of Elizabeth II's accession as Queen of Canada
- February 7
  - Eleven people, including 10 migrant workers from Peru, die when a passenger van crashes into a flatbed truck near Stratford, Ontario.
  - Prime Minister Stephen Harper begins a four-day visit to China.
- February 10 – A Red Arrow bus skids out of control and flips on its side near Redwater, Alberta. At least 28 people were injured in the incident.
- February 26 – Three Via Rail employees die when a train derails near Burlington, Ontario.
- March 3 – Near Montreal, a charter bus crashes killing two people and injuring 48 others.
- March 5 – The federal government announces they are closing the Canadian embassy in Damascus amid the continuing violence in Syria.
- March 19 – NDP candidate Craig Scott wins a federal by-election in Toronto—Danforth.
- March 22 – Vaughn Solomon Schofield becomes lieutenant governor of Saskatchewan, replacing Gordon Barnhart.
- March 23 – In Perth-Andover, a high spring freshet coupled with an ice jam causes a rise in water levels surpassing those in the 1987 flood. A mandatory evacuation order was issued. About 500 people were affected.
- March 24 – Thomas Mulcair is elected leader of the New Democratic Party.
- March 29
  - Finance Minister Jim Flaherty announces the 2012 budget which includes cuts to the Canadian Broadcasting Corporation, the reduction of over 19,000 federal jobs, and the discontinuation of the penny by the Royal Canadian Mint.
  - The federal government announces they will gradually raise the age of eligibility for Old Age Security from 65 to 67 starting in 2023.

=== April to June ===
- April 1 – Juno Awards in Ottawa, Ontario
- April 12 – John James Grant becomes Lieutenant Governor of Nova Scotia, replacing Mayann Francis.
- April 15 – 100th anniversary of the sinking of the RMS Titanic
- April 19
  - The federal government announced they will close Kingston Penitentiary, which has housed convicted killers such as Paul Bernardo and Russell Williams.
  - One hundred and fifty students are arrested in Gatineau after violent protests against Quebec's proposed tuition hikes.
- April 20 – Allyson McConnell is convicted of manslaughter after drowning her two sons in the bath as revenge against their father. She is sentenced to six years in prison but serves only 15 months.
- April 23
  - The Progressive Conservative Association of Alberta wins a majority government of 61 seats in the 2012 Alberta election. The Wildrose Party wins 17 seats to become the Official Opposition for the first time. The Liberal Party wins five seats and New Democratic Party four.
  - Thunder Bay—Superior North MP Bruce Hyer leaves the NDP caucus after being disciplined for voting against the NDP's position on the gun registry.
- April 24 – A sawmill in Prince George, British Columbia, explodes, killing two workers.
- April 24–25 – Saskatchewan 3.0 Summit takes place.
- April 28 – Seven killed in an Alberta Highway 63 crash near Fort McMurray
- May 12 – Two private planes collide in midair near St. Brieux, Saskatchewan, killing five people.
- May 18
  - An Ontario Superior Court judge declares the 2011 federal election results in the riding of Etobicoke Centre to be "null and void", potentially triggering a by-election.
  - The Quebec government passes Bill 78 which places restrictions on the ongoing protests over the forthcoming tuition hikes in the province.
- May 20 – Charles, Prince of Wales, and Camilla, Duchess of Cornwall, arrive in Fredericton beginning a four-day royal tour across the country.
- May 24 – Nearly 700 people are held in two Quebec cities in the biggest single night of mass arrests since student protests over fees began in February.
- May 24/25 – International student Jun Lin is murdered in Montreal by Luka Magnotta. A video of Lin's killing and dismemberment featuring necrophilia is uploaded to the internet, Magnotta also mails his victim's hands and feet to Canadian elementary schools and federal political party offices.
- May 28 – Jason Godin, at 19 years old, becomes the youngest mayor in the history of New Brunswick and Canada.
- May 30 – Lee Richardson resigns as MP for Calgary Centre, to accept a job as principal secretary to Alberta Premier Alison Redford.
- June 2 – A shooting at the Toronto Eaton Centre leaves one dead and seven others injured.
- June 15 – A shooting at the University of Alberta in Edmonton leaves three dead.
- June 16 – A stage collapses before a Radiohead concert in Toronto, killing one person and injuring three more.
- June 18 – 200th anniversary of the start of War of 1812.
- June 23 – A partial roof collapse at the Algo Centre Mall in Elliot Lake, Ontario, injures dozens and kills two.
- June 25 – Floods across the British Columbia Interior cause hundreds of people to evacuate. One man was killed.

=== July to September ===
- July 1 – Celebrations of the 145th anniversary of Confederation.
- July 3 – The 33rd Finale des Jeux de l'Acadie of Nova Scotia ends.
- July 12 – Johnsons Landing, British Columbia, is hit by a landslide. Four people were missing.
- July 16 –
  - The Danzig Street shooting at a suburban block party leaves 2 dead and 24 injured in Toronto's worst mass shooting.
  - 57 Barrie residents are evacuated for a week while explosives are removed from the suburban home of a confessed murderer.
- July 31 – Bev Oda resigns as Minister for International Cooperation and as MP for Durham.
- August 31 – Citing health, Denise Savoie resigns as MP for Victoria.
- September 4 –
  - The Parti Québécois win a minority government in the 2012 Quebec general election, with the Quebec Liberal Party coming in a close second.
  - A shooting takes place during Premier-Designate Pauline Marois's victory speech at the Parti Québécois rally, killing one man and injuring another.
- September 6 – 60th anniversary of CBC Television.
- September 7 – The government, saying Iran is a "threat to global peace", closes the Canadian embassy in Iran and gives Iranian diplomats five days to leave Canada.
- September 19 – Pauline Marois is sworn in as premier of Quebec, following a general election, becoming Quebec's first female premier, and the first time in Canada that five provinces or territories have simultaneously had female premiers (until February 2013).
- September 21 – A state funeral is held for former premier of Alberta Peter Lougheed, at the Southern Alberta Jubilee Auditorium in Calgary.
- September 24 – An outbreak of E. coli causes at least four illnesses in Alberta, a massive beef recall, and the temporary shutdown of XL Foods in Brooks, Alberta.
- September 26 – A controversial motion (M-312) to re-open the abortion debate is defeated in the House of Commons, with members voting 203–91 against it.

=== October to December ===
- October 2 – A wildfire strikes Vita, Manitoba, destroying at least four houses and one bridge.
- October 10 – Suicide of Amanda Todd.
- October 18 – The Canadian Radio-television and Telecommunications Commission rejects BCE's bid to take over Astral Media, citing that the deal would have given the company too much market power.
- October 25
  - Eight children are injured when a van crashes into a classroom in St. Paul, Alberta. One of the children died in hospital the next day.
  - Wawa, Ontario, declares a state of emergency after severe flooding washes out several roadways in the municipality, including sections of both Highway 17 (the main route of the Trans-Canada Highway) and Highway 101.
  - The Supreme Court upholds the election result in Etobicoke Centre, with Conservative MP Ted Opitz keeping his seat.
- October 26 – 20th anniversary of the referendum of Charlottetown Accord.
- October 27 – A 7.7-magnitude earthquake strikes off the coast of Moresby Island. A small tsunami occurred not long after the quake.
- November 2 – Judith Guichon becomes Lieutenant Governor of British Columbia, replacing Steven Point.
- November 5 – Gérald Tremblay resigns as mayor of Montreal, following allegations of corruption within the city government at the provincial Charbonneau commission.
- November 8 – An explosion in Sherbrooke kills two people and injures almost 20 more.
- November 9 – Gilles Vaillancourt, the mayor of Laval, Quebec, since 1989, resigns following allegations of corruption within Laval's city government at the provincial Charbonneau commission.
- November 16 – Michael Applebaum is selected as the new Mayor of Montreal in a council vote, winning 31 votes to 29 for challenger Richard Deschamps.
- November 23 – Alexandre Duplessis is selected as the new mayor of Laval, Quebec, in a council vote, winning 15 to three over challenger Jacques St-Jean.
- November 26 – Three federal by-elections. The Conservatives won Calgary Centre (Alberta) and Durham (Ontario), and the New Democratics won in Victoria (British Columbia).
- December 3 – Health Canada suspended the licence of Chemi Pharmaceutical Inc., after finding falsified test results, during a health inspection.

== Arts and literature ==
=== Art ===
- May 29 – Jim Unger, creator of the widely syndicated Herman, dies at home in Saanich.

=== Television ===
New channels launched were Sportsnews, ABC Spark, Explora, and Nat Geo Wild; leaving the air waves were Dusk, and Fox Sports World Canada. Scheduled to launch are Cartoon Network and a regional news channel operated by Global BC.

New series include Total Drama: Revenge of the Island (January 5), Mr. D (January 9), Arctic Air (January 10), The L.A. Complex (January 10), Les Bleus de Ramville (January 19), Undercover Boss Canada (February 2), Canada's Got Talent (March 4), Saving Hope (June 7), Over the Rainbow (September 16), The Bachelor Canada (October 3).

=== Literature ===
- Will Ferguson wins the Scotiabank Giller Prize for 419.

== Sport ==
- January 2–5: 2012 World Junior Ice Hockey Championships relegation round and finals – Calgary, Alberta
- January 16–22: 2012 Canadian Figure Skating Championships – Moncton, New Brunswick
- February 1–5: 2012 Molson Canadian Men's Provincial Curling Championship – Saint John, New Brunswick
- February 19–26: 2012 Scotties Tournament of Hearts – Red Deer, Alberta
- March 3–11: 2012 Tim Hortons Brier – Saskatoon, Saskatchewan
- May 27: The Shawinigan Cataractes win their first Memorial Cup by defeating the London Knights 2 to 1. The tournament was played at Centre Bionest in Shawinigan, Quebec
- June 10: 2012 Canadian Grand Prix – Montreal, Quebec
- July 22: 2012 Edmonton Indy – Edmonton, Alberta
- July 27–August 12: Canada at the 2012 Summer Olympics in London, UK
- August 19–September 9: Canada at the 2012 Summer Paralympics in London, UK
- September 16: Members of the National Hockey League Players' Association are locked out by the owners of the league's franchises
- November 23: The Laval Rouge et Or win their seventh Vanier Cup by defeating the McMaster Marauders 37 to 14 in the 48th Vanier Cup played at Rogers Centre in Toronto
- November 25: The Toronto Argonauts win their 16th Grey Cup by defeating the Calgary Stampeders in the 100th Grey Cup played at Rogers Centre in Toronto. Courtice, Ontario's Ricky Foley was named the game's Most Outstanding Canadian

== Deaths in 2012 ==
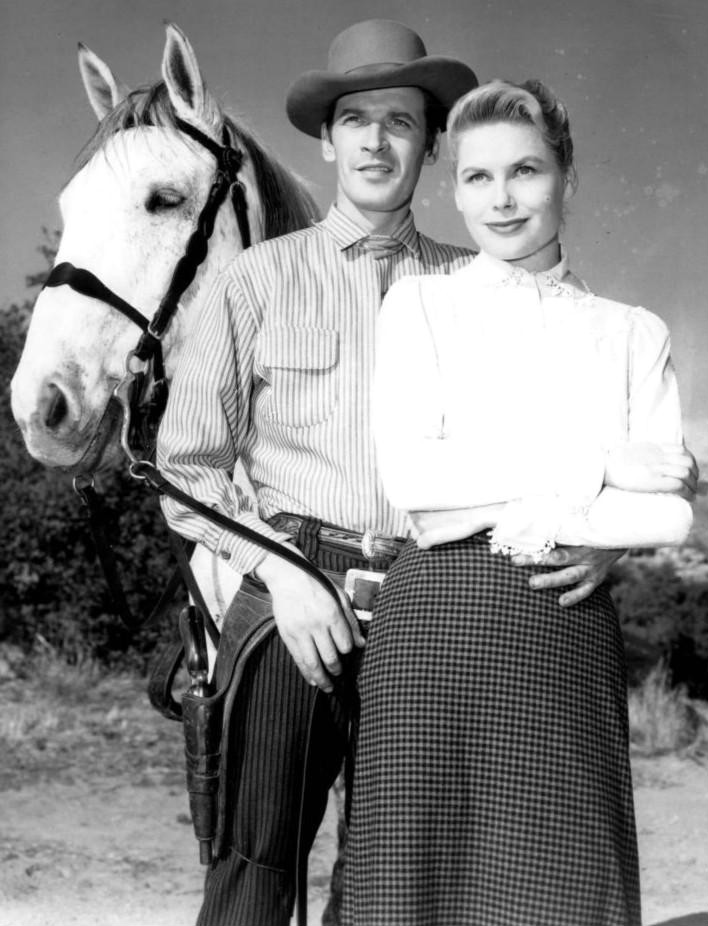
Peter Breck died February 6

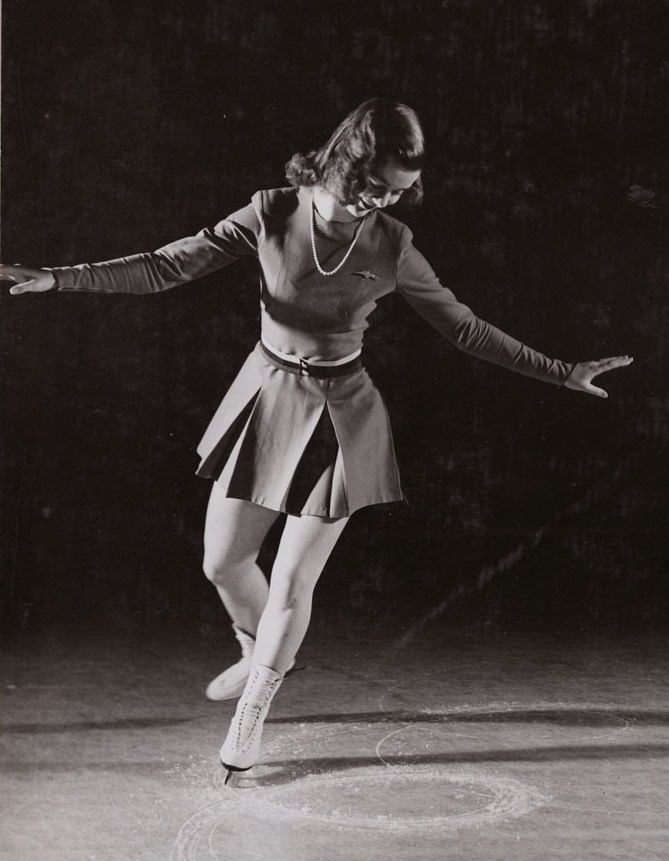
Barbara Ann Scott died September 30

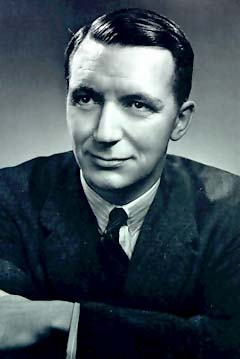
James Coyne died October 12

=== January ===
- January 2 -
  - Ian Bargh, British-born jazz pianist
  - Gordon Hirabayashi, American-born civil rights activist (Hirabayashi v. United States).
- January 3 – Josef Škvorecký, Czech-born writer and publisher, cancer
- January 4 – Rod Robbie, architect
- January 5 – Thelma Forbes, former Manitoba MLA
- January 9 –
  - Louis Boekhout, Dutch-born painter
  - Ron Caron, sports administrator
  - Larry Solway, actor and radio broadcaster
- January 10 – Jean Pigott, former Member of Parliament
- January 11 – Edgar Kaiser, businessman
- January 15 – Richard Bader, chemist
- January 17 – Colin Campbell, Roman Catholic bishop of Antigonish
- January 18 – Theo Dimson, artist (born 1930)
- January 19 – Sarah Burke, freestyle skier
- January 20 – Margaret Renwick, former Ontario MPP
- January 21 – John D. Lowry, film restorer
- January 22 – Clarence Tillenius, artist and conservationist
- January 25 – Andrew MacNaughtan, photographer and music video director
- January 27 – Tom Campbell, former mayor of Vancouver
- January 28 – Don Starkell, writer
- January 30 –
  - Don Blenkarn, former Member of Parliament
  - Klaus Goldschlag, ambassador

=== February ===
- February 2 – Joyce Barkhouse, writer
- February 5 – Blaine MacDonald, editorial cartoonist
- February 6 -
  - Peter Breck, American-born actor. (born 1929)
  - Colleen Thibaudeau, poet and short-story writer (born 1925)
  - David Winter, academic. (born 1930)
- February 8 -
  - Laurent Desjardins, politician (born 1923)
  - Gunther Plaut, rabbi (born 1912)
- February 9 – Fred Dickson, lawyer and Senator
- February 10 – Ed Harrison, ice hockey player (New York Rangers, Boston Bruins). (born 1927)
- February 11 –
  - Trent Frayne, sportswriter
  - John Sperry, Anglican Bishop of the Arctic (1974–1990). (born 1924)
- February 15 – Doug McNichol, Canadian Football League player
- February 16 –
  - Gary Carter, American baseball player (Montreal Expos). (born 1954)
  - Warren Hudson, Canadian Football League player. (born 1962)
  - Ethel Stark, violinist and conductor. (born 1910)
- February 18 – Cal Murphy, CFL manager and coach
- February 21 – Pierre Juneau, film and broadcast executive.
- February 24 – István Anhalt, Hungarian-born composer. (born 1919)
- February 28 – Jim Green, American-born politician and activist. (born 1943)

=== March ===
- March 7 – Dave Hrechkosy, hockey player (California Golden Seals, St. Louis Blues)
- March 9 – Herb Carnegie, hockey player
- March 10 -
  - Tony Silipo, politician, Ontario Minister of Education (1991–1993) and MPP for Dovercourt (1990–1999)
  - Nik Zoricic, ski cross racer,
- March 11 – Tom Manastersky, football player (Montreal Alouettes) and hockey player (Montreal Canadiens)
- March 12 – Madeleine Parent, union leader and women's rights activist
- March 16 – Ray Gariepy, ice hockey player. (born 1928)
- March 17 – René Fontaine, politician, Minister of Northern Development (1987–1990). (born 1933)
- March 22 -
  - Joe Blanchard, American-born player of Canadian football (Edmonton Eskimos), professional wrestler and promoter
  - Ron Stewart, hockey player (Toronto Maple Leafs, New York Rangers, Boston Bruins)
- March 25 – Bob DeCourcy, hockey player
- March 27 – Marc Gervais, Jesuit, writer, and film professor. (born 1929)
- March 28 -
  - Leonard Braithwaite, lawyer and politician. (born 1923)
  - William Sampson, author. (born 1959)
- March 30 – Janet Anderson Perkin, baseball player and curler. (born 1921)

=== April ===
- April 3 -
  - Lorne Benson, football player (Winnipeg Blue Bombers). (born 1930)
  - Michael Bzdel, Ukrainian Catholic hierarch, Metropolitan of Winnipeg (1992–2006). (born 1930)
- April 7 – Harold Robert Steacy, mineralogist. (born 1923)
- April 9 -
  - Wiebo Ludwig, environmental activist. (born 1941)
  - Barry Cahill, actor (Grand Theft Auto, Sweet Bird of Youth). (born 1921)
- April 11 – Roger Caron, author, prison escape artist, and bank robber, infection. (born 1938)
- April 12 – Robert Kennedy, publisher. (born 1938)
- April 13 – Irving Barber, forester and philanthropist. (born 1923)
- April 14 -
  - Emile Bouchard, hockey player (Montreal Canadiens). (born 1919)
  - Tom Farrell, politician. (born 1924)
  - C. Miller Fisher, neurologist. (born 1913)
  - Jonathan Frid, actor. (born 1924)
- April 16 – Randy Starkman, sports journalist. (born 1960)
- April 18 – René Lépine, real estate developer. (born 1929)
- April 19 – Jacques Martin, Paralympian, gold medalist (1984, 1988, 1992, 1996). (born 1959)
- April 21 – Jerry Toppazzini, ice hockey player (Boston Bruins, Chicago Blackhawks, Detroit Red Wings). (born 1931)
- April 23 -
  - Billy Bryans, musician and record producer. (born 1947)
  - Raymond Thorsteinsson, geologist. (born 1921)
  - Flo Whyard, politician, Mayor of Whitehorse (1981–1983), Yukon territorial minister (1975–1978), editor of the Whitehorse Star. (born 1917)
- April 26 – Ted Newall, businessman. (born 1935)
- April 27 – Allen Tough, scientist, complications of multiple system atrophy. (born 1936)
- April 28 – Al Ecuyer, American-born football player (Edmonton Eskimos). (born 1937)

=== May ===
- May 1 – James Kinley, engineer and industrialist, Lieutenant Governor of Nova Scotia (1994–2000). (born 1925)
- May 2 – James Marker, American-born businessman and inventor of Cheezies. (born 1922)
- May 8 – William Aquin Carew, Roman Catholic prelate, Apostolic Nuncio to Japan (1983–1997). (born 1922)
- May 12 -
  - Paul Cyr, ice hockey player (Buffalo Sabres, New York Rangers, Hartford Whalers). (born 1963)
  - Neil McKenty, radio talk-show host and author. (born 1924)
- May 18 – Paul O'Sullivan, comedian and actor. (born 1964)
- May 26 – Hans Schmidt, professional wrestler. (born 1925)
- May 27 – Jan de Vries, army veteran. (born 1924)
- May 28 – Jim Unger, English-born cartoonist (Herman). (born 1937)

=== June ===
- June 4 – Bernard Jean, lawyer and politician, member (1960–1970) and Speaker (1963–1966) of the Legislative Assembly of New Brunswick. (born 1925)
- June 8 – Pat Mahoney, businessman, politician, and judge, MP for Calgary South (1968–1972), General Manager of the Calgary Stampeders (1965). (born 1929)
- June 11 – Ann Rutherford, actress (Gone with the Wind, The Secret Life of Walter Mitty). (born 1917)
- June 17 – Nathan Divinsky, mathematician, author, and chess master. (born 1925)
- June 22 – Fernie Flaman, ice hockey player (Boston Bruins, Toronto Maple Leafs) and Hall of Fame member. (born 1927)
- June 25 – Lucella MacLean, baseball player (All-American Girls Professional Baseball League). (born 1921)

=== July ===
- July 6 -
  - Bill Norrie, politician and educator, Mayor of Winnipeg (1979–1992), Chancellor of the University of Manitoba (2001–2009), respiratory failure. (born 1929)
  - Anthony Sedlak, chef, and the host of Food Network Canada's The Main. (born 1983)
- July 7 – Ralph Raymond Loffmark, politician. (born 1920)
- July 8 – Dick Fowler, Mayor of St. Albert, MLA. (born 1932)

=== September ===
- September 13 – Peter Lougheed, former Premier of Alberta, (born 1928)
- September 23 – Sam Sniderman, founder of the Sam the Record Man chain (born 1920)
- September 24 – Bruno Bobak, artist (born 1923)
- September 26 – Sylvia Fedoruk, scientist, curler and Lieutenant Governor of Saskatchewan (born 1927)
- September 30 – Barbara Ann Scott, figure skater and Olympic gold medalist (born 1928)

=== October ===
- October 10 – Amanda Todd, cyberbullying victim (born 1996)
- October 12 – James Elliott Coyne, Governor Bank of Canada (born 1910)
- October 19
  - Lincoln Alexander, politician, MP for Hamilton West (1968–1980), Minister of Labour (1979–1980), and the first black Lieutenant Governor of Ontario (1985–1991) (born 1922)
  - Raymond Dumais, Roman Catholic ex-prelate, Bishop of Gaspé (1993–2001) (born 1950)
- October 25 – Aude, writer

=== November ===
- November 3 – Henri Audet, founder of Cogeco media and communications company, originally a cable system
- November 4 – Errol Black, academic and politician (born 1939)
- November 5 – Bob Kaplan, politician, oversaw creation of CSIS, Solicitor General (1980–1984), MP for Don Valley (1968–1972) and York Centre (1974–1993) (born 1936)
- November 9
  - Helen Mussallem, nurse (born 1915)
  - Jim Sinclair, non-status Indian aboriginal activist and politician (born 1933)
- November 12 – Michel Hrynchyshyn, Ukrainian Catholic hierarch, Apostolic Exarch in France, Benelux and Switzerland (1982–2012) (born 1929)
- November 14 – Lucien Laferte, ski jumper (born 1919)
- November 17 – Arnaud Maggs, artist and photographer (born 1926)
- November 21 – Nick Discepola, Italian-born politician, MP for Vaudreuil (1993–1997) and Vaudreuil-Soulanges (1997–2004) (born 1949)
- November 23 – John Kemeny, Hungarian-born film producer (The Apprenticeship of Duddy Kravitz, Atlantic City) (born 1925)
- November 24 – Shawn Little, politician (born 1924)
- November 27
  - Gilbert Clements, Lieutenant Governor of Prince Edward Island (1995–2001) (born 1928)
  - Pat Connolly, sports broadcaster (born 1928)

=== December ===
- December 2 – Tom Hendry, playwright, founder of Manitoba Theatre Centre (born 1929)
- December 14 – Hazel McIsaac, politician, Newfoundland and Labrador House of Assembly member for St. George's (1975–1982) (born 1933)
- December 16 – Laurier LaPierre, broadcaster and politician, Senator from Ontario (2001–2004) (born 1929)
- December 18 – Camil Samson, politician, MNA for Rouyn-Noranda (1970–1981) (born 1935)
- December 19 – Douglas Leiterman, producer and journalist (This Hour Has Seven Days) (born 1927)
- December 20
  - Eagle Keys, American-born CFL football player (Montreal Alouettes, Edmonton Eskimos) and coach (Saskatchewan Roughriders) (born 1923)
  - Albert Renaud, ice hockey player (born 1920)
- December 22 – Willy Blok Hanson, Javanese-born dancer (born 1914)
- December 25 – Lynn Watters, Olympic sailor (born 1916)
- December 26 – Rebecca Tarbotton, environmental activist, director of Rainforest Action Network (born 1973)
- December 31
  - Jovette Marchessault, writer and artist (born 1938)
  - John Sheardown, diplomat (born 1924)

== See also ==
- 2012 in Canadian music
- 2012 in Canadian television
- List of Canadian films of 2012
