= 1925 in Canada =

- Decades: 1900s; 1910s; 1920s; 1930s; 1940s
- See also: History of Canada; Timeline of Canadian history; List of years in Canada

Events from the year 1925 in Canada.

== Incumbents ==
=== Crown ===
- Monarch – George V

=== Federal government ===
- Governor General – Julian Byng
- Prime Minister – William Lyon Mackenzie King
- Chief Justice – Francis Alexander Anglin (Ontario)
- Parliament – 14th (until 5 September)

=== Provincial governments ===
==== Lieutenant governors ====
- Lieutenant Governor of Alberta – Robert Brett (until October 29) then William Egbert
- Lieutenant Governor of British Columbia – Walter Cameron Nichol
- Lieutenant Governor of Manitoba – James Albert Manning Aikins
- Lieutenant Governor of New Brunswick – William Frederick Todd
- Lieutenant Governor of Nova Scotia – MacCallum Grant (until January 12) then James Robson Douglas (January 12 to September 14) then James Cranswick Tory
- Lieutenant Governor of Ontario – Henry Cockshutt
- Lieutenant Governor of Prince Edward Island – Frank Richard Heartz
- Lieutenant Governor of Quebec – Narcisse Pérodeau
- Lieutenant Governor of Saskatchewan – Henry William Newlands

==== Premiers ====
- Premier of Alberta – Herbert Greenfield (until November 23) then John Edward Brownlee
- Premier of British Columbia – John Oliver
- Premier of Manitoba – John Bracken
- Premier of New Brunswick – Peter Veniot (until September 14) then John Baxter
- Premier of Nova Scotia – Ernest Howard Armstrong (until July 16) then Edgar Nelson Rhodes
- Premier of Ontario – George Howard Ferguson
- Premier of Prince Edward Island – James D. Stewart
- Premier of Quebec – Louis-Alexandre Taschereau
- Premier of Saskatchewan – Charles Avery Dunning

=== Territorial governments ===
==== Commissioners ====
- Gold Commissioner of Yukon – George P. MacKenzie (until April 1) then Percy Reid
- Commissioner of Northwest Territories – William Wallace Cory

== Events ==
- February 5 – Post Office workers are brought under civil service regulations.
- February 24 – The Lake of the Woods Treaty works out joint Canadian-American control of the Lake of the Woods.
- April 13 – Women win the right to vote in Newfoundland.
- May 28 – Roddick Gates unveiled in Montreal.
- June 2 – 1925 Saskatchewan general election: Charles Dunning's Liberals win a sixth consecutive majority
- June 10 – The United Church of Canada opens for services.
- June 11 – Coal miner William Davis was killed by police in the culmination of a long Cape Breton Island strike.
- June 23 – First ascent of Mount Logan, the highest mountain in Canada.
- June 26 – A strike of miners in Drumheller, Alberta ends in violent confrontations.
- July 16 – Edgar Rhodes becomes premier of Nova Scotia, replacing Ernest Armstrong.
- September 14 – John Baxter becomes premier of New Brunswick, replacing Peter Veniot
- October 29 – Federal election: Arthur Meighen's Conservatives win a plurality (116 seats), defeating Mackenzie King's Liberals (99 seats). However, King does not resign as prime minister; he will try to govern with a minority government with the support of smaller parties and independent MPs (30 seats)
- November 23 – John Brownlee becomes premier of Alberta, replacing Charles Stewart
- The Canadian Legion of the British Empire Service League, later the Royal Canadian Legion, is formed by the amalgamation of several veterans' organizations, such as the Great War Veterans Association.
- The federal divorce law was changed to allow a woman to divorce her husband on the same grounds that a man could divorce his wife – simple adultery. Before this, a woman had to prove adultery in conjunction with other acts such as "sodomy" or bestiality in order to initiate a divorce.

== Arts and literature ==
- October 1 – The Vancouver School of Applied and Decorative Arts opened its doors.

== Sport ==
- March 23 and 25 – The South Saskatchewan Junior Hockey League's Regina Pats win their first Memorial Cup by defeating the Ontario Hockey Association's Toronto Aura Lee 7 to 3 in a 2-game aggregate played in Arena Gardens in Toronto
- March 30 – The Western Canada Hockey League's Victoria Cougars win their only Stanley Cup by defeating the National Hockey League's Montreal Canadiens 3 games to 1. The deciding game was played at Vancouver's Denman Arena. The Cougars are the last non-NHL team to win the Stanley Cup, as they would soon become the Detroit Red Wings
- December 5 – The Ottawa Senators win their first Grey Cup by defeating the Winnipeg Tammany Tigers 24 to 1 in the 13th Grey Cup played at Ottawa's Lansdowne Park

== Births ==
=== January to June ===
- January 26 – Claude Ryan, politician (d. 2004)
- February 1 – Hugh Horner, politician, physician and surgeon (d. 1997)
- February 7 – Hans Schmidt, professional wrestler (d. 2012)
- March 2 – Bernard Jean, lawyer and politician, member (1960–1970) and Speaker (1963–1966) of the Legislative Assembly of New Brunswick (d. 2012)
- March 23 – Wilson Duff, anthropologist (d. 1976)
- March 25 – Daniel Yanofsky, chess player, Canada's first chess grandmaster (d. 2000)
- March 26 – Ben Mondor, baseball executive (Pawtucket Red Sox) (d. 2010)
- April 1 – Tobie Steinhouse, artist
- April 4 – Claude Wagner, judge and politician (d. 1979)
- April 11 – Pierre Péladeau, businessman (d. 1997)
- May 18 – Robin Blaser, author and poet (d. 2009)

=== July to September ===
- July 21 – Johnny Peirson, ice hockey player (d. 2021)
- July 25 – Charmion King, actress (d. 2007)

Oscar Peterson

- July 29 – Ted Lindsay, ice hockey player (d. 2019)
- August 2 – William Andres, politician (d. 2010)
- August 11 – Floyd Curry, ice hockey player (d. 2006)
- August 15 – Oscar Peterson, jazz pianist and composer (d. 2007)
- August 22 – Terry Donahue, female professional baseball player (d. 2019)
- September 4 – Calvin Ruck, anti-racism activist and Senator (d. 2004)
- September 11 – Harry Somers, composer (d. 1999)
- September 24 – Dan Heap, politician (d. 2014)

=== October to December ===
- October 2 – Wren Blair, hockey coach and manager (Minnesota North Stars, Pittsburgh Penguins) (d. 2013)
- October 6 – Bud Olson, politician, Minister and Senator (d. 2002)
- October 12 – Denis Lazure, politician (d. 2008)
- October 21 – Peter Dickinson, architect (d. 1961)
- October 21 – Louis Robichaud, lawyer, politician and 25th Premier of New Brunswick (d. 2005)
- November 8 – Allan Lawrence, politician and Minister (d. 2008)
- November 10 – Doris Anderson, author, journalist and women's rights activist (d. 2007)
- November 12 – Agnes Nanogak, illustrator (d. 2001)
- December 5 – Dave Broadfoot, comedian (d. 2016)
- December 25 – Robert Layton, politician (d. 2002)
- December 29 – Colleen Thibaudeau, poet and short-story writer (d. 2012)

== Deaths ==
=== January to June ===
- January 25 – Charles-Eusèbe Dionne, naturalist and taxidermist (b. 1845)
- March 3 – William Pugsley, lawyer, politician and 10th Premier of New Brunswick (b. 1850)
- March 16 – Richard Butler, editor, publisher, journalist and U.S. vice-consul (b. 1834)
- May 4 – James Cunningham, merchant and politician (b. 1834)
- May 25 – Margaret Mick, prison guard, first female Canadian peace officer to be killed in the line of duty (b. 1860)
- June 18 – William Brymner, art teacher and painter (b. 1855)

=== July to December ===
- August 15 – Adam Beck, politician and hydro-electricity advocate (b. 1857)
- September 6 – George Henry Bradbury, politician (b. 1859)
- November 2 – James Alexander Lougheed, businessman and politician (b. 1854)

== See also ==
- List of Canadian films
