= 2019 in Canada =

- Decades: 1990s; 2000s; 2010s; 2020s
- See also: History of Canada; Timeline of Canadian history; List of years in Canada

Events from the year 2019 in Canada.

== Incumbents ==
=== The Crown ===
- Monarch – Elizabeth II

=== Federal government ===
- Governor General – Julie Payette
- Prime Minister – Justin Trudeau
- Parliament – 42nd (until 11 September), then 43rd (from 5 December)

=== Provincial governments ===
==== Lieutenant Governors ====
- Lieutenant Governor of Alberta – Lois Mitchell
- Lieutenant Governor of British Columbia – Janet Austin
- Lieutenant Governor of Manitoba – Janice Filmon
- Lieutenant Governor of New Brunswick –

- Jocelyne Roy-Vienneau (until August 2)
- vacant (August 2 to September 8)
- Brenda Murphy (since September 8)

- Lieutenant Governor of Newfoundland and Labrador – Judy Foote
- Lieutenant Governor of Nova Scotia – Arthur LeBlanc
- Lieutenant Governor of Ontario – Elizabeth Dowdeswell
- Lieutenant Governor of Prince Edward Island – Antoinette Perry
- Lieutenant Governor of Quebec – J. Michel Doyon
- Lieutenant Governor of Saskatchewan –

- W. Thomas Molloy (until July 2)
- vacant (July 2 to 18)
- Russell Mirasty (since July 18)

==== Premiers ====
- Premier of Alberta – Rachel Notley (until April 30), then Jason Kenney
- Premier of British Columbia – John Horgan
- Premier of Manitoba – Brian Pallister
- Premier of New Brunswick – Blaine Higgs
- Premier of Newfoundland and Labrador – Dwight Ball
- Premier of Nova Scotia – Stephen McNeil
- Premier of Ontario – Doug Ford
- Premier of Prince Edward Island – Wade MacLauchlan (until May 9), then Dennis King
- Premier of Quebec – François Legault
- Premier of Saskatchewan – Scott Moe

=== Territorial governments ===
==== Commissioners ====
- Commissioner of Nunavut – Nellie Kusugak
- Commissioner of the Northwest Territories – Margaret Thom
- Commissioner of Yukon – Angélique Bernard

==== Premiers ====
- Premier of Nunavut – Joe Savikataaq
- Premier of the Northwest Territories – Bob McLeod (until October 24), then Caroline Cochrane
- Premier of Yukon – Sandy Silver

== Events ==
=== January ===
- January 5 – Finland won the gold medal match of the 2019 World Junior Ice Hockey Championships (which began 26 December 2018).
- January 11 – A double-decker bus accident OC Transpo struck a bus shelter killing three people and injuring 23 others in Ottawa.
- January 13 to 30 – The 2019 Canadian Figure Skating Championships were held.
- January 22 – A CN Rail train derailed at a level crossing on Saskatchewan Highway 11 north of Saskatoon. Nobody was hurt. There was significant damage to the train and crossing.

=== February–March ===
- February 15 to March 3 – 2019 Canada Winter Games in Red Deer.
- March 10 – Daylight saving time starts
- March 16 to 17 – Juno Awards of 2019 in London
- March 18 – Proceedings of the Senate of Canada were televised for the first time in the chamber's history.
- March 20 – The Crucifix that has hung in the Montreal council chamber since 1937 is taken down.
- March 30 to April 7 – 2019 World Men's Curling Championship in Lethbridge

=== April–May ===
- April 3 – Quebec City announces that it has no plans to remove the Crucifix inside their city council chamber.
- April 16 – Alberta general election held. United Conservatives win a majority government, defeating New Democrats.
- April 23 – Prince Edward Island general election held. The Progressive Conservative Party wins a minority government, the Green Party will form the official opposition.
- May 15 – The 2019 Canadian Championship began. They are to be held till September 25, 2019.
- May 16 – Newfoundland and Labrador general election held. The Liberal Party retains power but with a minority government which was Newfoundland and Labrador's first minority government since 1971.
- May 17 to 26 – 2019 Memorial Cup held in Halifax

=== June–July ===
- June 13 – The Toronto Raptors win their first NBA championship in the 2019 NBA Finals, the first time a Canadian team had won the NBA championship.
- June 17 – Quebec passed Bill 21, a law which bars public servants from wearing religious symbols while on duty.
- June 27 – Costco Canada opens the Biggest store in Canada in the Galway area of St. John's, Newfoundland and Labrador that is 17,000 sm
- July 9 –
  - The Crucifix in the National Assembly of Quebec that Quebec Premier Maurice Duplessis hung there in 1936 (83 years), is removed.
  - 46 people were sent to the hospital after a serious carbon monoxide leak at a Super 8 motel in Winnipeg. There were no fatalities.
- July 14 to July 19 – 2019 Northern British Columbia murders
- July 31 – Canada withdrew its peacekeeping forces from Mali.

=== August–September ===
- August 7 – Bodies believed to be the suspects of the Northern British Columbia murders are found in dense brush near the Nelson River.
- August 11 – Bianca Andreescu wins the 2019 Rogers Cup in the women's singles event after Serena Williams retires the match due to an upper back injury. This is the first time a Canadian has won the event since 1969.
- August 31 – Contracts for Ontario teachers and education workers expires.
- September 10 – Manitoba general election held. The Progressive Conservative Party wins a second majority government.
- September 19 – Photos and a video of blackface from 2001 of Prime Minister Justin Trudeau are released. Trudeau later apologizes for the photos and the video.

=== October–November ===
- October 1 – Northwest Territories general election was held.
- October 21 – The 2019 Canadian federal election was held, with the Liberal Party forming a minority government.
- November 3 – Daylight saving time ends.
- November 11 – Longtime hockey analyst Don Cherry is fired from Hockey Night in Canada, by Sportsnet.
- November 23 – Calgary Dinos win the Vanier Cup, in Quebec City.
- November 24 – Winnipeg Blue Bombers win the Grey Cup, in Calgary.
- November 25 – 2019 World Ringette Championships in Burnaby, British Columbia.

=== December ===
- December 9 – Bianca Andreescu awarded the 2019 Lou Marsh Trophy
- December 12 – Andrew Scheer announces pending resignation as leader of the Conservative Party.

== Deaths ==
=== January ===
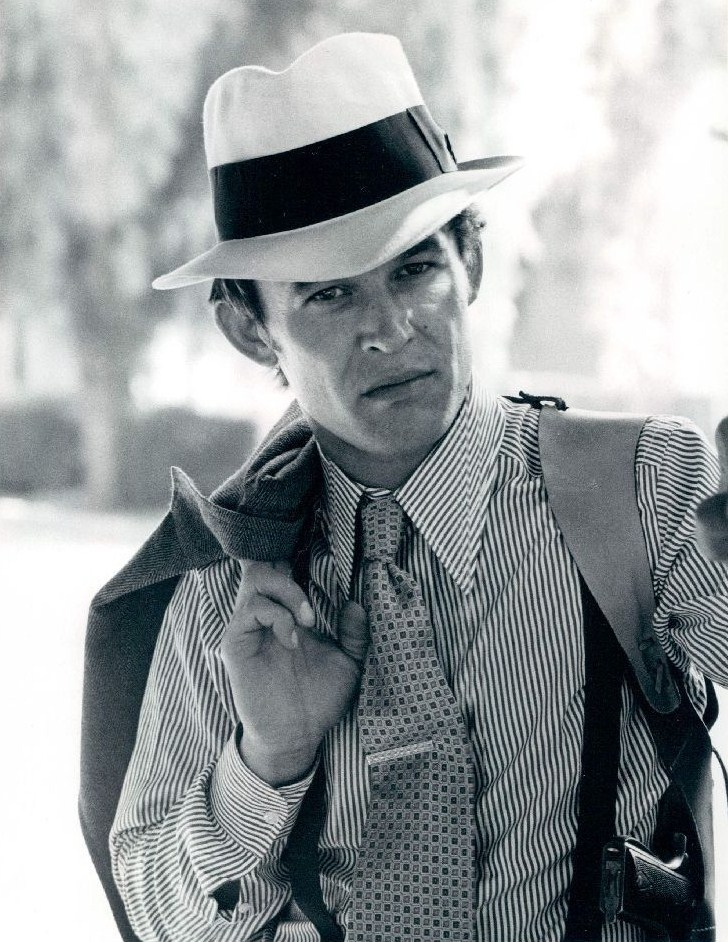
Paul Koslo

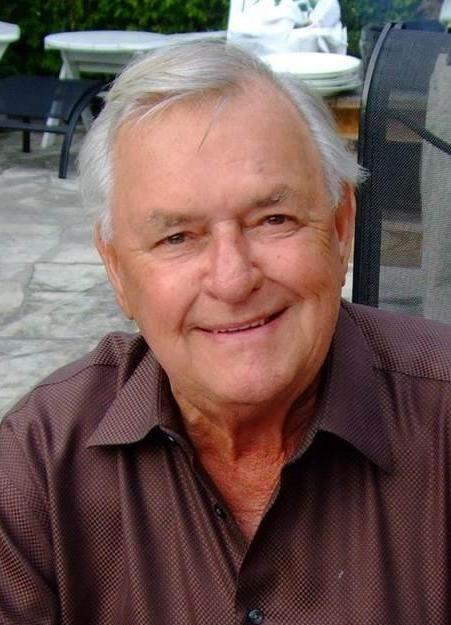
Ron Joyce

- 3 January
  - William Miller, football player (born 1957)
  - Marcelle Corneille administrator and educator (born 1923)
- 4 January
  - Peter Doucette, politician (born 1954)
  - Frank Mugglestone, 94, English rugby league footballer (Bradford Northern, Castleford).
  - Norman Snider, screenwriter (born 1945)
- 5 January
  - Jean-Eudes Dubé, politician (born 1926)
  - Gerry Plamondon, ice hockey player (born 1924)
  - Alexis Smirnoff, wrestler (born 1947)
  - Myron Thompson, politician (born 1936)
- 6 January
  - George Crowe, ice hockey coach (born 1936)
  - Gene Zwozdesky, politician (born 1948)
- 9 January
  - Pierre de Bané, senator (born 1938)
  - Paul Koslo, actor (born 1944)
- 11 January
  - Mark Elliot, radio host (born 1953)
  - Marge Callaghan, baseball player (born 1921)
- 12 January
  - George Ball, entomologist (born 1926)
  - Dennis Marvin Ham, politician (born 1941)
- 13 January – Bo Westlake, rower (born 1927)
- 14 January – Gavin Smith poker player(born 1968)
- 16 January
  - Jean Chatillon, composer (born 1937)
  - Alfred Kunz, composer (born 1929)
- 18 January
  - Walter Craig, mathematician (born 1953)
  - Gilles Paquet, economist (born 1936)
  - François Protat, cinematographer
- 19 January – Red Sullivan, ice hockey player (born 1929)
- 22 January – A. Brian Deer, librarian (born 1945)
- 23 January – Jim McKean, Major League Baseball umpire (born 1945)
- 25 January – Jacques Berthelet, Roman Catholic bishop (born 1934)
- 29 January – Andy Hebenton, ice hockey player (born 1929)
- 31 January
  - Ron Joyce, businessman, co-founder of Tim Hortons (born 1930)
  - William Winegard, politician (born 1924)

=== February ===
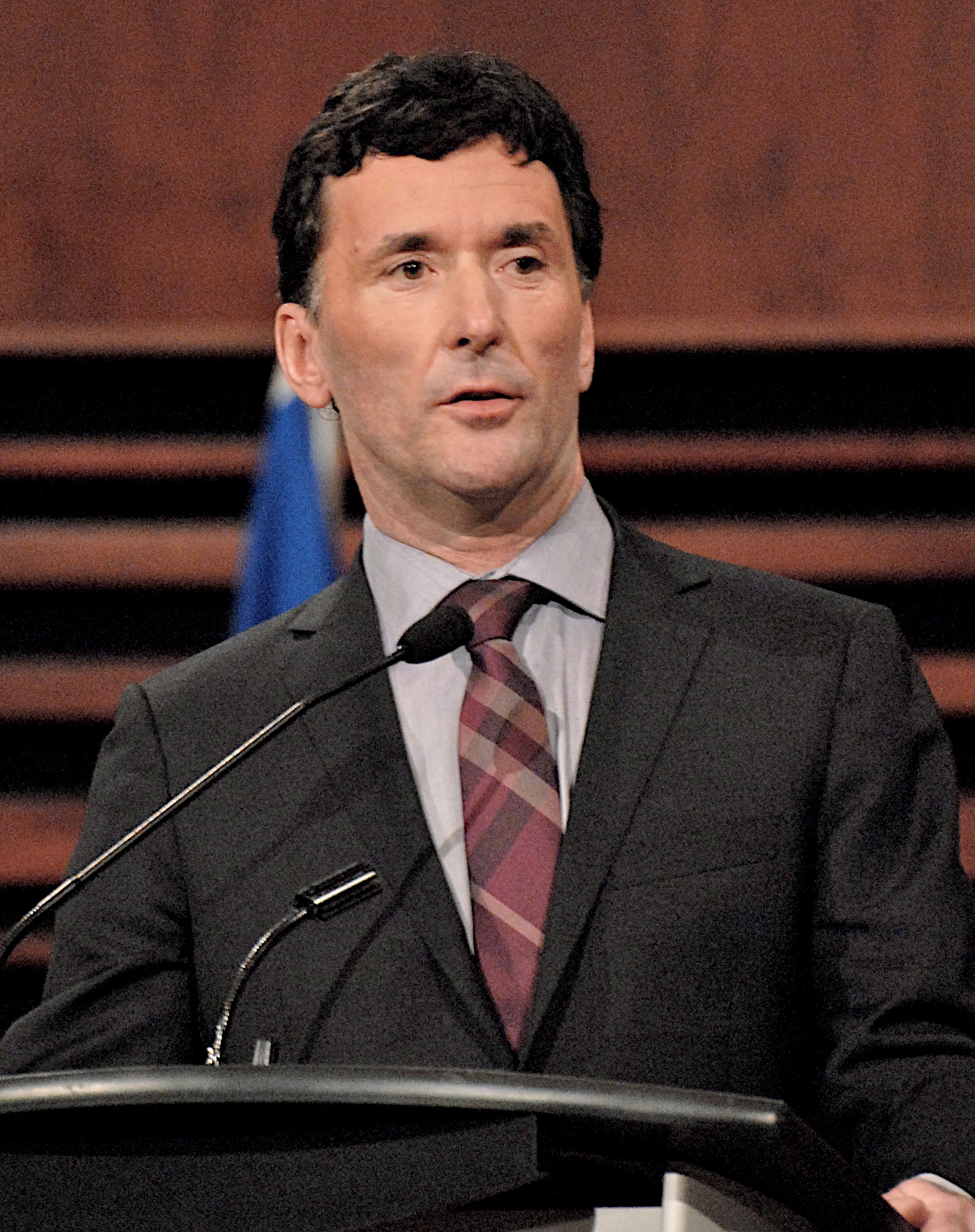
Paul Dewar

- 1 February – Raymond Ratzlaff, politician (born 1931)
- 2 February
  - Michael Ferguson, Auditor General of Canada (born 1958)
  - William Slater, swimmer (born 1940)
- 4 February – Phil Western, musician (born 1971)
- 6 February – Paul Dewar, educator and politician from Ottawa (born 1963)
- 10 February – Michael Wilson, politician (born 1937)
- 11 February
  - James Burns, businessman
  - Joe Schlesinger, television journalist, and author (born 1928)
- 15 February – Erminie Cohen, senator (born 1926)
- 16 February – Albert Ludwig, politician and author (born 1919)
- 18 February – Charles Deblois, politician (born 1939)
- 23 February – Bob Adams, decathlete (born 1924)
- 24 February – Trevor Eyton, senator and businessman (born 1934)
- 25 February – Chantal duPont, multidisciplinary artist (born 1942)
- 27 February – Sandra Faire, television producer and philanthropist
- 28 February – Ed Bickert, jazz guitarist (born 1932)

=== March ===
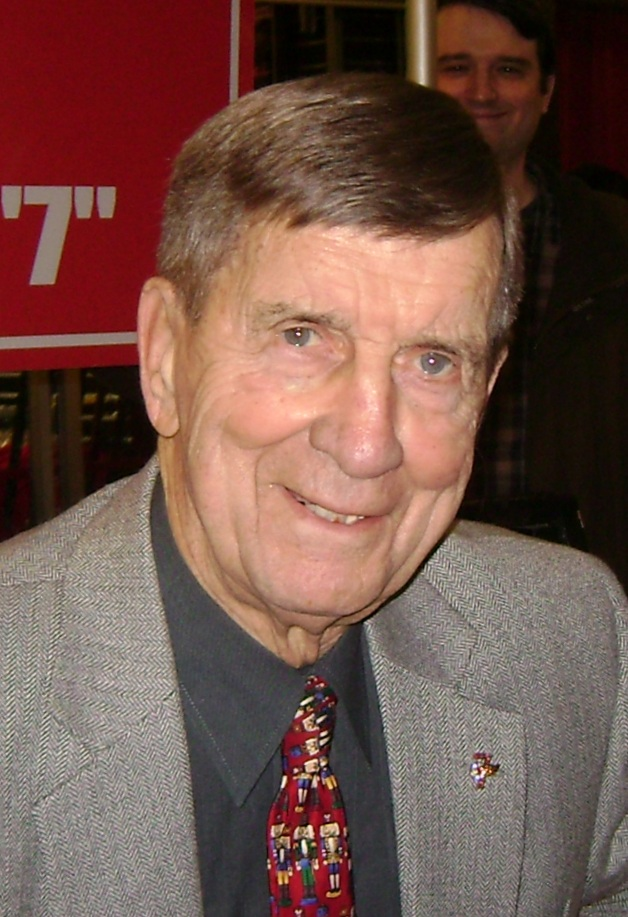
Ted Lindsay

- March 1 – Elly Mayday, model and women's health advocate (born 1988)
- March 4
  - Robert Wagner Dowling, politician (born 1924)
  - Art Hughes, Canadian soccer player (born 1930)
  - Ted Lindsay, professional ice hockey player (born 1925)
- March 5
  - Richard Allen, politician (born 1929)
  - Stephen Irwin, architect (born 1939)
- March 6
  - Gordon Osbaldeston, civil servant (born 1930)
  - Charlie Panigoniak, Inuktitut singer and guitarist (born 1946)
- March 7 – Patrick Lane, poet (born 1939)
- March 9 – Harry Howell, ice hockey player (born 1932)
- March 11 – Joe Rosenblatt, poet (born 1933)
- March 16 – Joe Fafard, sculptor (born 1942)

=== April ===
- April 3 – Mary Borgstrom, potter and ceramist (born 1916
- April 7 – Wilbert Keon, physician and senator (born 1935)
- April 19 – William Krehm, author, journalist, political activist and real estate developer (born 1913)
- April 28 – Wayson Choy, writer (born 1939)

=== May ===
- May 2
  - Red Kelly, ice hockey player and politician (born 1927)
  - Murray Thomson, activist (born 1922)
- May 23 – Mike Laffin, politician and dentist (born 1918)

=== June ===
- June 20 – Mark Warawa, politician (born 1950)
- June 30 – John Rafferty, politician (born 1953)

=== July ===
- July 2 – W. Thomas Molloy, 22nd Lieutenant Governor of Saskatchewan
- July 7 – Edna Anderson, politician. (born 1922)
- July 8 – Greg Johnson, ice hockey player (b. 1971)

=== August ===
- August 2
  - Jocelyne Roy-Vienneau, 31st Lieutenant Governor of New Brunswick (b. 1955/1956)
  - Deepak Obhrai, Canadian Member of Parliament for Calgary Forest Lawn (b. 1950)
- August 19 – Bette Stephenson, physician and politician (born 1924)

=== September ===
- September 17 – Harvey Wylie, gridiron football player (born 1933)
- September 18 – Graeme Gibson, writer (born 1934)
- September 20 – Rick Bognar, wrestler (born 1970)

=== October ===
- October 7 – Devan Bracci-Selvey, school student and murder victim (born 2005)
- October 9 – Anne Hart, writer (born 1935)
- October 30 – Bernard Slade, playwright (born 1930)

=== December ===
- December 11 – Fernande Saint-Martin, art critic, museologist, semiologist, visual arts theorist and writer (born 1927)
- December 24 – Kelly Fraser, Inuk pop singer and songwriter (born 1993)

== See also ==
- 2019 Canadian federal election
- 2019 in Canadian television
- List of Canadian films of 2019
