= 1928 in Canada =

- Decades: 1900s; 1910s; 1920s; 1930s; 1940s
- See also: History of Canada; Timeline of Canadian history; List of years in Canada

Events from the year 1928 in Canada.

== Incumbents ==
=== Crown ===
- Monarch – George V

=== Federal government ===
- Governor General – Freeman Freeman-Thomas, 1st Marquess of Willingdon
- Prime Minister – William Lyon Mackenzie King
- Chief Justice – Francis Alexander Anglin (Ontario)
- Parliament – 16th

=== Provincial governments ===
==== Lieutenant governors ====
- Lieutenant Governor of Alberta – William Egbert
- Lieutenant Governor of British Columbia – Robert Randolph Bruce
- Lieutenant Governor of Manitoba – Theodore Arthur Burrows
- Lieutenant Governor of New Brunswick – William Frederick Todd (until December 28) then Hugh Havelock McLean
- Lieutenant Governor of Nova Scotia – James Cranswick Tory
- Lieutenant Governor of Ontario – William Donald Ross
- Lieutenant Governor of Prince Edward Island – Frank Richard Heartz
- Lieutenant Governor of Quebec – Narcisse Pérodeau (until December 31) then Lomer Gouin
- Lieutenant Governor of Saskatchewan – Henry William Newlands

==== Premiers ====
- Premier of Alberta – John Edward Brownlee
- Premier of British Columbia – John Duncan MacLean (until August 21) then Simon Fraser Tolmie
- Premier of Manitoba – John Bracken
- Premier of New Brunswick – John Baxter
- Premier of Nova Scotia – Edgar Nelson Rhodes
- Premier of Ontario – George Howard Ferguson
- Premier of Prince Edward Island – Albert Charles Saunders
- Premier of Quebec – Louis-Alexandre Taschereau
- Premier of Saskatchewan – James Garfield Gardiner

=== Territorial governments ===
==== Commissioners ====
- Gold Commissioner of Yukon – George A. Jeckell (until April 1) then George Ian MacLean
- Commissioner of Northwest Territories – William Wallace Cory

== Events ==
- April 2 – Camillien Houde elected mayor of Montreal
- April 24 – The Supreme Court of Canada rules that women are not persons who can hold office according to the British North America Act, 1867—reversed a year later by the Judicial Committee of the Privy Council in Britain
- May 7 – The St. Roch is launched. It would become the first ship to sail the Northwest Passage from west to east and to circumnavigate North America.
- May 31 – The Legislative Council of Nova Scotia is abolished
- July 4 – Jean Lussier goes over Niagara Falls in a rubber ball.
- August 20 – John Duncan MacLean resigns as premier of British Columbia
- August 21 – Simon Fraser Tolmie becomes premier of British Columbia, replacing John Duncan MacLean
- August 25 – Canada's first major air disaster occurred when bad weather caused a BC Airways Ford Trimotor plane to crash in Puget Sound, Washington

== Science and technology ==
- Frank Morse Robb of Ontario obtains a patent for the first Electronic Organ, the Robb Wave Organ.

== Sports ==
- The Winter Olympics take place in St. Moritz, Switzerland. The University of Toronto Grads won a gold medal in ice hockey.
- The Summer Olympics take place in Amsterdam. Percy Williams and Ethel Catherwood won gold medals for Canada.
- March 26 – The South Saskatchewan Junior Hockey League's Regina Pats win their second Memorial Cup by defeating the Ottawa City Junior Hockey League's Ottawa Gunners 2 game to 1. The deciding Game 3 was played Arenas Garden in Toronto
- December 1 – The Hamilton Tigers win their third Grey cup by shutting out the Regina Roughriders 30 to 0 in the 16th Grey Cup played at A.A.A Grounds in Hamilton

== Births ==
=== January to March ===
- January 2
  - Avie Bennett, businessman and philanthropist (d. 2017)
  - Allen Sapp, painter (d. 2015)
- January 7 – Benny Woit, ice hockey player (d. 2016)
- January 20 – Peter Donat, actor (d. 2018)
- January 25 – Jérôme Choquette, lawyer and politician (d. 2017)
- February 8 – Gene Lees, biographer and lyricist (d. 2010)
- February 13 – Gerald Regan, politician, Minister and Premier of Nova Scotia (d. 2019)
- February 16 – Les Costello, ice hockey player and Catholic priest (d. 2002)
- February 26 – Donald Davis, actor (d. 1998)
- March 3 – Diane Foster, athlete (d. 1999)
- March 9 – Gerald Bull, engineer and artillery designer (d. 1990)
- March 10 – Robert Coates, politician and minister (d. 2016)
- March 12 – Thérèse Lavoie-Roux, politician and senator (d. 2009)
- March 13 – Douglas Rain, actor and narrator (d. 2018)
- March 17
  - André Chagnon, businessman and philanthropist (d. 2022)
  - William John McKeag, politician and Lieutenant-Governor of Manitoba (d. 2007)
- March 20 – James K. Irving, businessman (d. 2024)
- March 31 – Gordie Howe, ice hockey player (d. 2016)

=== April to June ===
- April 10
  - Kenneth Earl Hurlburt, politician (d. 2016)
  - Fraser MacPherson, jazz musician (d. 1993)
- April 17 – Fabien Roy, politician
- April 28 – Zbigniew Basinski, physicist
- April 30 – Hugh Hood, novelist, short story writer, essayist and university professor (d. 2000)
- May 4 – Maynard Ferguson, jazz trumpet player and bandleader (d. 2006)
- May 7 – Bruno Gerussi, actor and television presenter (d. 1995)
- May 9 – Barbara Ann Scott, figure skater and Olympic gold medalist (d. 2012)
- May 23
  - Pauline Julien, singer, songwriter, actress and feminist activist (d. 1998)
  - Sidney Spivak, politician and Minister (d. 2002)
- June 1 – Larry Zeidel, Canadian-American ice hockey player and sportscaster (d. 2014)
- June 2 – George Wearring, basketball player (d. 2013)
- June 13 – Renée Morisset, pianist (d. 2009)
- June 25 – Michel Brault, cinematographer, cameraman, film director, screenwriter and producer (d. 2013)
- June 26 – Samuel Belzberg, businessman, philanthropist (d. 2018)

=== July to December ===
- July 3 – Raymond Setlakwe, entrepreneur, lawyer and politician (d. 2021)
- July 7 – Tom Chambers, politician (d. 2018)
- July 12 – Paul Ronty, ice hockey centre (d. 2020)
- July 17 – Robert Nixon, politician
- July 21 – Anne Harris, sculptor
- July 22 – Hugh Edighoffer, politician (d. 2019)
- July 23 – Irving Grundman, ice hockey executive and politician (d. 2021)
- July 26 – Peter Lougheed, lawyer and politician (d. 2012)
- July 28 – Ann Sloat, politician (d. 2017)
- July 31 – Gilles Carle, film director and screenwriter (d. 2009)
- August 7 – James Randi, stage magician and scientific skeptic (d. 2020 in the United States)
- September 10
  - Roch Bolduc, civil servant, politician
  - Jean Vanier, founder of L'Arche (d. 2019)
- September 20 – Jacqueline Desmarais, billionaire philanthropist (d. 2018)
- October 1 – Jim Pattison, businessman
- October 7 – Raymond Lévesque, singer-songwriter (d. 2021)
- October 9 – Clare Drake, ice hockey coach (d. 2018)
- October 27 – Gilles Vigneault, poet, publisher and singer-songwriter
- November 3 – Gary Lautens, humorist and newspaper columnist (d. 1992)
- November 10 – Diane Oxner, soprano and voice teacher (d. 2025)
- November 16 – David Adams, ballet dancer (d. 2007)
- November 20 – Toni Onley, painter (d. 2004)
- November 28 – Floyd Crawford, ice hockey player (d. 2017)
- December 10 – Michael Snow, artist (d. 2023)
- December 12 – Lionel Blair, dancer and entertainer (d. 2021 in the United Kingdom)
- December 16 – Roy Bailey, politician (d. 2018)
- December 21 – Clayton Kenny, boxer (d. 2015)
- December 24 – Adam Exner, Roman Catholic archbishop (d. 2023)
- December 28 – Moe Koffman, flautist and saxophonist (d. 2001)
- December 29
  - Robert Hylton Brisco, politician (d. 2004)
  - Norman Cafik, politician (d. 2016)

== Deaths ==
- January 13 – Earle Nelson, serial killer, hanged (b. 1897 in the United States)
- February 15 – Edward Murray Wrong, historian (b. 1889)
- March 4 – Victoria Grace Blackburn, journalist (b. 1865)
- April 6 – Godfroy Langlois, politician, journalist and lawyer (b. 1866)
- April 16 – Henry Birks, businessman (b. 1840 in the United Kingdom)
- April 28 – George Gerald King, politician (b. 1836)
- May 2 – Marie-Louise Marmette, writer (b. 1870)
- May 16 – Frederick Arthur Verner, landscape painter (b. 1836)
- December 1 – Rodolphe Monty, politician (b. 1874)

== See also ==
- List of Canadian films
