= 1927 in Canada =

- Decades: 1900s; 1910s; 1920s; 1930s; 1940s
- See also: History of Canada; Timeline of Canadian history; List of years in Canada

Events from the year 1927 in Canada.

== Incumbents ==
=== Crown ===
- Monarch – George V

=== Federal government ===
- Governor General – Freeman Freeman-Thomas, 1st Marquess of Willingdon
- Prime Minister – William Lyon Mackenzie King
- Chief Justice – Francis Alexander Anglin (Ontario)
- Parliament – 16th

=== Provincial governments ===
==== Lieutenant governors ====
- Lieutenant Governor of Alberta – William Egbert
- Lieutenant Governor of British Columbia – Robert Randolph Bruce
- Lieutenant Governor of Manitoba – Theodore Arthur Burrows
- Lieutenant Governor of New Brunswick – William Frederick Todd
- Lieutenant Governor of Nova Scotia – James Cranswick Tory
- Lieutenant Governor of Ontario – Henry Cockshutt (until January 12) then William Donald Ross
- Lieutenant Governor of Prince Edward Island – Frank Richard Heartz
- Lieutenant Governor of Quebec – Narcisse Pérodeau
- Lieutenant Governor of Saskatchewan – Henry William Newlands

==== Premiers ====
- Premier of Alberta – John Edward Brownlee
- Premier of British Columbia – John Oliver (until August 17) then John Duncan MacLean (from August 20)
- Premier of Manitoba – John Bracken
- Premier of New Brunswick – John Baxter
- Premier of Nova Scotia – Edgar Nelson Rhodes
- Premier of Ontario – George Howard Ferguson
- Premier of Prince Edward Island – James D. Stewart (until August 12) then Albert Charles Saunders
- Premier of Quebec – Louis-Alexandre Taschereau
- Premier of Saskatchewan – James Garfield Gardiner

=== Territorial governments ===
==== Commissioners ====
- Gold Commissioner of Yukon – Percy Reid (until November 13) then George A. Jeckell
- Commissioner of Northwest Territories – William Wallace Cory

== Events ==
- January 5 – The National Museum of Canada is created.
- January 9 – 76 people are killed when a fire breaks out at the Laurier Palace Theatre in Montreal.
- March 1 – The location of the boundary between Labrador and Quebec is settled by the Judicial Committee of the Privy Council, accepting the Dominion of Newfoundland's claim rather than Canada's.
- May 28 – The Old Age Pensions Act is introduced.
- July 1 – Confederation celebration marked by the first cross country radio broadcast.
- August 6 – Toronto Union Station is officially opened, by Prince Edward, Prince of Wales.
- August 12 – Albert Saunders becomes premier of Prince Edward Island, replacing James D. Stewart.
- August 17 – John Oliver, Premier of British Columbia, dies in office.
- August 20 – John Duncan MacLean becomes premier of British Columbia.
- September 21 – Ten Canadian Pacific Railway cars carrying a valuable cargo of silk goes off the rails near Yale, British Columbia. Five of the cars land in the Fraser River.
- October 4 – Worthington mine disaster occurs.
- October 11 – Richard Bedford Bennett, becomes leader of the Conservative Party of Canada.
- December 11 – Gamma Sigma Fraternity becomes the first high school fraternity to become international with Alpha Zeta chapter in Niagara Falls, Ontario, Canada.

== Arts and literature ==
- Mazo de la Roche publishes Jalna
- December 5 – The National Gallery of Canada opened an exhibit featuring the work of Emily Carr, bringing her out of obscurity.

== Science and technology ==
- Canadian anthropologist Davidson Black discovered a fossil molar of Peking Man in a cave near Beijing, China
- Wallace Rupert Turnbull tested the second design of his variable-pitch propeller, a key development in aviation

== Sport ==
- February 14 – Conn Smythe takes control of the Toronto St. Patricks and renames them to the Toronto Maple Leafs
- March 28 – Ontario Hockey Association's Owen Sound Greys win their second Memorial Cup by defeating Thunder Bay Junior Hockey League's Port Arthur West Ends 2 game to 0. All games were played at Arena Gardens in Toronto
- April 13 – Ottawa Senators win their 11th and final Stanley Cup by defeating the Boston Bruins 2 game to 0 (with 2 ties). The deciding game was played at the Ottawa Auditorium
- November 26 – Toronto Balmy Beach Beachers win their first Grey Cup by defeating the Hamilton Tigers 9 to 6 in the 15th Grey Cup played at Varsity Stadium in Toronto.

== Births ==
=== January to March ===
- January 1
  - Calum MacKay, ice hockey player (d. 2001)
  - Jean-Paul Mousseau, artist (d. 1991)
- January 4 – Paul Desmarais, financier (d. 2013)
- January 6 – John W. Grace, first Privacy Commissioner of Canada (d. 2009)
- January 10 – Gisele MacKenzie, singer (d. 2003)
- January 17 – Stan Roberts, politician (d. 1990)
- January 24 – Phyllis Lambert, architect and philanthropist
- January 25 – Gildas Molgat, politician (d. 2001)
- January 27 – Edith Firth, historian and librarian (d. 2005)
- January 28 – Sheila Finestone, politician and Senator (d. 2009)
- January 29 – Lewis Urry, chemical engineer and inventor (d. 2004)
- January 30 – Sterling Lyon, politician and 17th Premier of Manitoba (d. 2010)
- February 11 – Sinclair Stevens, politician (d. 2016)
- March 3 – William Kurelek, artist and writer (d. 1977)
- March 9 – John Beckwith, composer, writer, pianist, teacher and administrator (d. 2022)
- March 25 – Bill Barilko, ice hockey player (d. 1951)
- March 27 – Eugène Philippe LaRocque, Roman Catholic priest (d. 2018)
- March 28 – Fernande Saint-Martin, art critic, museologist, semiologist, visual arts theorist and writer (d. 2019)

=== April to June ===
- April 6
  - E. K. Turner, businessman and educator (d. 2018)
  - Dorothy Knowles, artist (d. 2023)
- April 8
  - Phyllis Webb, poet and broadcaster (d. 2021)
  - Lois Miriam Wilson, first female Moderator of the United Church of Canada and Senator (d. 2024)
- April 13 – Ronald Stewart, businessman and politician (d. 2022)
- April 25 – Frances Hyland, actress (d. 2004)
- May 2 – Budge Wilson, writer (d. 2021)
- May 5 – Sylvia Fedoruk, scientist, curler and Lieutenant Governor of Saskatchewan (d. 2012)
- May 14 – Frank Miller, politician and 19th Premier of Ontario (d. 2000)
- June 3 – George Hislop, gay activist (d. 2005)
- June 17 – Jean Robert Beaulé, politician (d. 2005)
- June 24 – Fernand Dumont, sociologist, philosopher, theologian and poet (d. 1997)
- June 25 – Nora McDermott basketball player, volleyball player, coach and physical education teacher (d. 2013)
- June 26 – Robert Kroetsch, novelist, poet and non-fiction writer (d. 2011)
- June 29
  - Marie Thérèse Killens, politician
  - Viola Myers, sprinter (d. 1993)
  - Pierre Savard, politician

=== July to December ===
- July 2 – Fern Villeneuve, aviator (d. 2019)
- July 18 – Keith MacDonald, politician (d. 2021)
- July 20 – Jack Horner, politician and Minister (d. 2004)
- July 21 – Hal Hatfield, football player
- August 17 – John Alan Beesley, diplomat and civil servant (d. 2009)
- September 1 – Chuck Dalton, basketball player, member of Olympic team (1952) (d. 2013)
- September 7 – Claire L'Heureux-Dubé, justice of the Supreme Court of Canada
- October 3 – Kenojuak Ashevak, artist (d. 2013)
- October 14 – Elmer Iseler, choir conductor and choral editor (d. 1998)
- October 15 – Peter Pollen, politician (d. 2017)
- November 3 – Harrison McCain, businessman (d. 2004)
- November 8 – Peter Munk, businessman and philanthropist (d. 2018)
- November 10
  - Gerry Glaude, professional ice hockey defenceman (d. 2017)
  - Joyce Trimmer, politician and first female mayor of Scarborough, Ontario (d. 2008)
- November 17 – Nicholas Taylor, geologist, businessman, politician and Senator (d. 2020)
- November 18 – Knowlton Nash, journalist, author and television news anchor (d. 2014)
- November 26 – Ernie Coombs, children's entertainer Mr. Dressup (d. 2001)
- November 30 – Tod Sloan, ice hockey player (d. 2017)
- December 6 – Marcel Pelletier, ice hockey player (d. 2017)
- December 7 – Grant Strate, dancer, choreographer and academic (d. 2015)
- December 18 – Roméo LeBlanc, politician and 25th Governor General of Canada (d. 2009)
- December 24 – Geoffrey Pearson, diplomat (d. 2008)

== Deaths ==
=== January to June ===
- January 24 – Agnes Maule Machar, author (b. 1837)
- February 10 – James Kidd Flemming, businessman, politician and 13th Premier of New Brunswick (b. 1868)
- March 8 – James Fisher, politician (b. 1840)
- March 16 – Robert Bond, politician and Prime Minister of Newfoundland (b. 1857)
- March 30 – Charles Hibbert Tupper, politician (b. 1855)
- June 3 – Henry Petty-Fitzmaurice, 5th Marquess of Lansdowne, Governor General of Canada (b. 1845)
- June 7 – Edmund James Flynn, politician and Premier of Quebec (b. 1847)

=== July to December ===
- August 17 – John Oliver, politician and Premier of British Columbia (b. 1856)
- November 2 – Charles Augustus Semlin, politician and Premier of British Columbia (b. 1836)
- November 5 – Jérémie-Louis Décarie, judge and lawyer (b. 1870)
- December 21 – Félix Gatineau, statesman (b. 1857)
- December 31 – William Warren, lawyer, politician, judge and Prime Minister of Newfoundland (b. 1879)

== See also ==
- List of Canadian films
