= 1932 in Canada =

- Decades: 1910s; 1920s; 1930s; 1940s; 1950s
- See also: History of Canada; Timeline of Canadian history; List of years in Canada

Events from the year 1932 in Canada.

== Incumbents ==
=== Crown ===
- Monarch – George V

=== Federal government ===
- Governor General – Vere Ponsonby, 9th Earl of Bessborough
- Prime Minister – Richard Bedford Bennett
- Chief Justice – Francis Alexander Anglin (Ontario)
- Parliament – 17th

=== Provincial governments ===
==== Lieutenant governors ====
- Lieutenant Governor of Alberta – William Legh Walsh
- Lieutenant Governor of British Columbia – John William Fordham Johnson
- Lieutenant Governor of Manitoba – James Duncan McGregor
- Lieutenant Governor of New Brunswick – Hugh Havelock McLean
- Lieutenant Governor of Nova Scotia – Walter Harold Covert
- Lieutenant Governor of Ontario – William Mulock (until November 1) then Herbert Alexander Bruce
- Lieutenant Governor of Prince Edward Island – Charles Dalton
- Lieutenant Governor of Quebec – Henry George Carroll
- Lieutenant Governor of Saskatchewan – Hugh Edwin Munroe

==== Premiers ====
- Premier of Alberta – John Edward Brownlee
- Premier of British Columbia – Simon Fraser Tolmie
- Premier of Manitoba – John Bracken
- Premier of New Brunswick – Charles Dow Richards
- Premier of Nova Scotia – Gordon Sidney Harrington
- Premier of Ontario – George Stewart Henry
- Premier of Prince Edward Island – James D. Stewart
- Premier of Quebec – Louis-Alexandre Taschereau
- Premier of Saskatchewan – James Thomas Milton Anderson

=== Territorial governments ===
==== Commissioners ====
- Gold Commissioner then Controller of Yukon – George Ian MacLean (until June 30) then George A. Jeckell
- Commissioner of Northwest Territories – Hugh Rowatt

== Events ==
- February 17 – The "Mad Trapper" is killed by the Royal Canadian Mounted Police (RCMP) in the Yukon
- July 20 – The Ottawa Imperial Conference is held, it creates a zone of preferential trade within the Commonwealth
- August 1 – The Co-operative Commonwealth Federation (CCF) is formed in Calgary
- August 3 – Henri Bourassa leaves Le Devoir
- October 29 – The Dominion Drama Festival is founded

=== Full date unknown ===
- A seven-month miners strike occurs in Alberta's coal mines in Crowsnest Pass
- The first family planning clinic in Canada is set up by Elizabeth Bagshaw in Hamilton, Ontario. At the time, providing birth control was illegal.

== Arts and literature ==
=== New Books ===
- A Broken Journey – Morley Callaghan

== Sport ==
- April 4 – The Northern Ontario Hockey Association's Sudbury Cub Wolves win their first Memorial Cup by defeating the Manitoba Junior Hockey League's Winnipeg Monarchs 2 games to 0. All games played at Shea's Amphitheatre in Winnipeg
- April 9 – The Toronto Maple Leafs win their third Stanley Cup by defeating the New York Rangers 3 game to 0. The deciding game was played at the newly opened Maple Leaf Gardens
- February 13 – Canada (represented by the Winnipeg Hockey Club) wins their fourth (consecutive) hockey gold medal at the 1932 Winter Olympics
- December 3 – The Hamilton Tigers win their fifth and final Grey Cup by defeating the Regina Roughriders 25 to 6 in the 20th Grey Cup played at Hamilton's Civic Stadium

== Births ==
=== January to March ===
- January 2 – Jean Little, author
- January 11 – Clotilda Douglas-Yakimchuk, nurse (d. 2021)
- February 4 – Bob Dawson, football player (d. 2017)
- February 13 – Robert Fulford, journalist (d. 2024)
- February 24 – John Vernon, actor (d. 2005)
- February 28 – Don Francks, actor (d. 2016)
- March 1 – Donald Stovel Macdonald, politician and minister
- March 2 – Jack Austin, politician and Senator
- March 14 – Norval Morrisseau, artist (d. 2007)

=== April to June ===
- April 3 – Jean-Claude Corbeil, linguist and lexicographer (d. 2022)
- April 6 – Eugène Bellemare, politician
- April 8 – Al Boliska, radio and television broadcaster
- April 12 – Dick Fowler, mayor, MLA (d. 2012)
- April 14 – Bill Bennett, politician and 27th Premier of British Columbia (d. 2015)
- April 22 – Ron Basford, politician and Minister (d. 2005)
- April 26 – Michael Smith, biochemist, 1993 Nobel Prize in Chemistry laureate (d. 2000)
- May 7 – Jordi Bonet, artist (d. 1979)
- May 28 – John Savage, politician and 23rd Premier of Nova Scotia (d. 2003)
- June 5 – Gérard Charles Édouard Thériault, general and Chief of the Defence Staff (d. 1998)
- June 10 – Hal Jackman, businessman and 25th Lieutenant Governor of Ontario
- June 24
  - Mel Hurtig, publisher, author and political activist
  - David McTaggart, environmentalist (d. 2001)

=== July to September ===
- July 11 – Jean-Guy Talbot, ice hockey defenceman and coach (d. 2024)
- July 13 – Hubert Reeves, astrophysicist (d. 2023)
- July 16 – Hédi Bouraoui, poet, novelist and academic
- July 22 – Doug Kyle, long-distance runner
- July 27 – George Ryga, playwright and novelist (d. 1987)
- August 2 – Leo Boivin, ice hockey player (d. 2021)
- August 11 – Izzy Asper, tax lawyer and media magnate (d. 2003)
- August 28 – Andy Bathgate, ice hockey player
- August 31 – Allan Fotheringham, newspaper and magazine journalist
- September 14 – Harry Sinden, ice hockey player, general manager and coach
- September 25 – Glenn Gould, pianist (d. 1982)
- September 27 – Gabriel Loubier, politician (d. 2025)

=== October to December ===
- October 16 – Lucien Paiement, politician, Mayor of Laval (d. 2013)
- October 18 – Iona Campagnolo, politician, first female Lieutenant Governor of British Columbia
- October 24 – Robert Mundell, professor of economics (d. 2021)
- November 10 – Martin Hattersley, lawyer and politician
- November 3 – Punch McLean, ice hockey coach (d. 2026)
- November 13 – Marilyn Brooks, fashion designer (d. 2026)
- November 29 – Ed Bickert, jazz guitarist (d. 2019)
- December 6 – Hank Bassen, ice hockey player (d. 2009)

== Deaths ==
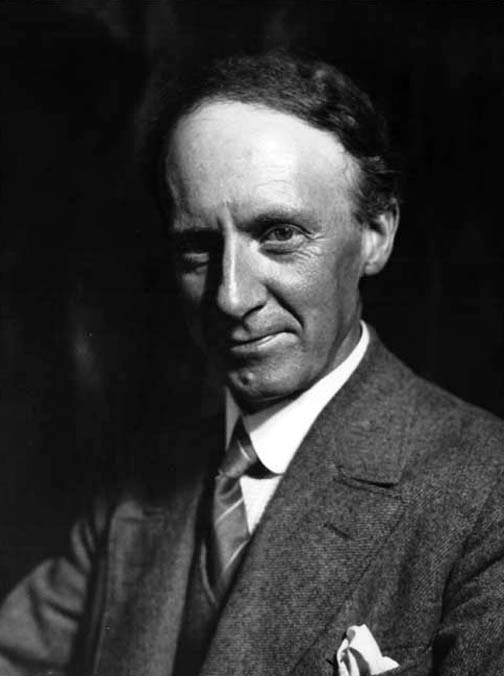
J. E. H. MacDonald

- March 6 – Joseph-Hormisdas Legris, politician and Senator (b. 1850)
- July 22 – Reginald Fessenden, inventor and radio pioneer (b. 1866)
- August 1 – Wellington Willoughby, politician and lawyer (b. 1859)
- August 7 – Napoléon Belcourt, politician (b. 1860)
- August 21 – Leonard Burnett, politician, farmer and teacher (b. 1845)
- November 11 – Georgina Fraser Newhall, author and the bardess of the Clan Fraser Society of Canada (b. 1860)
- November 26 – J. E. H. MacDonald, artist of the Group of Seven (b. 1873)
