= 2016 in Canada =

- Decades: 1990s; 2000s; 2010s; 2020s
- See also: History of Canada; Timeline of Canadian history; List of years in Canada

Events from the year 2016 in Canada.

== Incumbents ==
=== Crown ===
- Monarch – Elizabeth II

=== Federal government ===
- Governor General – David Johnston
- Prime Minister – Justin Trudeau
- Chief Justice – Beverley McLachlin (British Columbia)
- Parliament – 42nd

=== Provincial governments ===
==== Lieutenant Governors ====
- Lieutenant Governor of Alberta – Lois Mitchell
- Lieutenant Governor of British Columbia – Judith Guichon
- Lieutenant Governor of Manitoba – Janice Filmon
- Lieutenant Governor of New Brunswick – Jocelyne Roy-Vienneau
- Lieutenant Governor of Newfoundland and Labrador – Frank Fagan
- Lieutenant Governor of Nova Scotia – John James Grant
- Lieutenant Governor of Ontario – Elizabeth Dowdeswell
- Lieutenant Governor of Prince Edward Island – Frank Lewis
- Lieutenant Governor of Quebec – J. Michel Doyon
- Lieutenant Governor of Saskatchewan – Vaughn Solomon Schofield

==== Premiers ====
- Premier of Alberta – Rachel Notley
- Premier of British Columbia – Christy Clark
- Premier of Manitoba – Greg Selinger (until May 3), then Brian Pallister
- Premier of New Brunswick – Brian Gallant
- Premier of Newfoundland and Labrador – Dwight Ball
- Premier of Nova Scotia – Stephen McNeil
- Premier of Ontario – Kathleen Wynne
- Premier of Prince Edward Island – Wade MacLauchlan
- Premier of Quebec – Philippe Couillard
- Premier of Saskatchewan – Brad Wall

=== Territorial governments ===
==== Commissioners ====
- Commissioner of Yukon – Doug Phillips
- Commissioner of Northwest Territories – George Tuccaro (until May 10), then vacant (Gerald W. Kisoun [acting])
- Commissioner of Nunavut – Nellie Kusugak

==== Premiers ====
- Premier of the Northwest Territories – Bob McLeod
- Premier of Nunavut – Peter Taptuna
- Premier of Yukon – Darrell Pasloski (until December 3), then Sandy Silver

== Events ==
=== January ===
- January 10 – The recently opened Nipigon River Bridge near Nipigon, Ontario, is closed to traffic after a mechanical failure, severing the Trans-Canada Highway and forcing a detour into the United States.
- January 17 – The government of Justin Trudeau announces the appointment of David MacNaughton as Canadian Ambassador to the United States and Marc-André Blanchard as the Permanent Representative of Canada to the United Nations.
- January 22 – Four people are killed and seven others are injured in a shooting spree at a house and high school in La Loche, Saskatchewan.
- January 28 – The first case of Zika virus is reported in Canada, contracted by people returning from the affected areas
- January 29 – An avalanche kills five and injures eight near McBride, British Columbia.

=== February ===
- February 17 – The Montreal newspaper La Presse publishes an interview with a man who says that influential film director Claude Jutra began sexually abusing him at the age of six, corroborating more limited allegations of pedophilia against Jutra in Yves Lever's newly published biography of the director. Despite having urged caution upon the initial reports, numerous organizations and governments respond to the interview by announcing plans to remove Jutra's name from various events and geographic sites named in his honour, including Québec Cinéma's Prix Jutra film awards, the Academy of Canadian Cinema and Television's Claude Jutra Award, and numerous streets and public parks in Quebec.

=== April ===
- April 4 – The 2016 Saskatchewan general election results in a third consecutive majority government for Premier Brad Wall and the Saskatchewan Party.
- April 10 – 52% of delegates at the 2016 NDP convention vote in support of a leadership review motion to hold a leadership race within 24 months. Party leader Tom Mulcair announces he will stay on as leader until his replacement is chosen.
- April 19 – The 2016 Manitoba general election results in a majority victory for Brian Pallister and the Progressive Conservative Party, defeating Premier Greg Selinger and the governing New Democratic Party.

=== May ===
- May 3–4 – Fort McMurray, Alberta, is fully evacuated due to a catastrophic wildfire that destroyed numerous structures.
- May 8 – The first 5-pin perfect game in the 52-year history of the Youth Bowling Canada Nationals is bowled in Calgary, Alberta.
- May 10 – Canada 2016 census
- May 24 - In Toronto's High Park Zoo, two capybaras escape their enclosure. They were found about a month later and returned.
- May 29 – Two people – including an intern from Red River Community College – are severely beaten by two addiction-rehab teenagers in Selkirk, Manitoba. Both victims survived but the intern may lose eyesight.

=== June ===
- June 28 – A huge explosion completely destroys a house and damages 24 others in Mississauga, Ontario. At least one person is dead and 13 others are injured, according to Mississauga Fire and Emergency Services. Thousands of residents are forced to evacuate and many spend the night at a local community shelter.

=== July ===
- July 29 – A caravan of motorcycles are wrecked in a chain reaction crash after attempting to pass an RV that was making a left turn. One of the riders was killed and at least nine were injured. The wreck happened near Edmundston, New Brunswick.

=== August ===
- August 20 – The Tragically Hip’s final concert is held in Kingston, Ontario, and broadcast nationwide.

=== September ===
- September 9 – 14 dogs die in a Saskatoon, Saskatchewan kennel after a thermostat or HVAC failure heated a boarding room to 37 °C overnight.
- September 15 – Mylan Hicks, a member of the Calgary Stampeders, dies after getting shot outside a Calgary nightclub.

=== October ===
- October 25 – Former nurse and serial killer Elizabeth Wettlaufer is charged with the murders of eight of her patients. She was accused of killing the elderly victims with insulin injections over a period of seven years in Woodstock and London, Ontario
- October 30 - Prime Minister Justin Trudeau signed the Comprehensive Economic and Trade Agreement (CETA) between Canada and the European Union. This move removes 98% tariffs on goods between Canada and the E.U.

=== November ===
- November 7 – Yukon general election held, resulting in a Liberal majority government.

=== December ===
- December 2 - Vancouver Skytrain opens the Evergreen Extension which extends transit to Coquitlam.

== Sport ==
- May 29 – The London Knights win their second Memorial Cup by defeating the Rouyn-Noranda Huskies 3 to 2. The tournament was played ENMAX Centrium in Red Deer, Alberta
- June 12 – Halifax's Sidney Crosby of the Pittsburgh Penguins is awarded the Conn Smythe Trophy
- November 26 – The Laval Rouge et Or win their ninth Vanier Cup by defeating the Calgary Dinos 31 to 26 in the 52nd Vanier Cup played at Tim Hortons Field in Hamilton
- November 27 – The Ottawa Redblacks win their first Grey Cup by defeating the Calgary Stampeders 39 to 33 in the 104th Grey Cup played at BMO Field in Toronto. Peterborough's Brad Sinopoli was awarded the game's Most Outstanding Canadian

== Deaths in 2016 ==
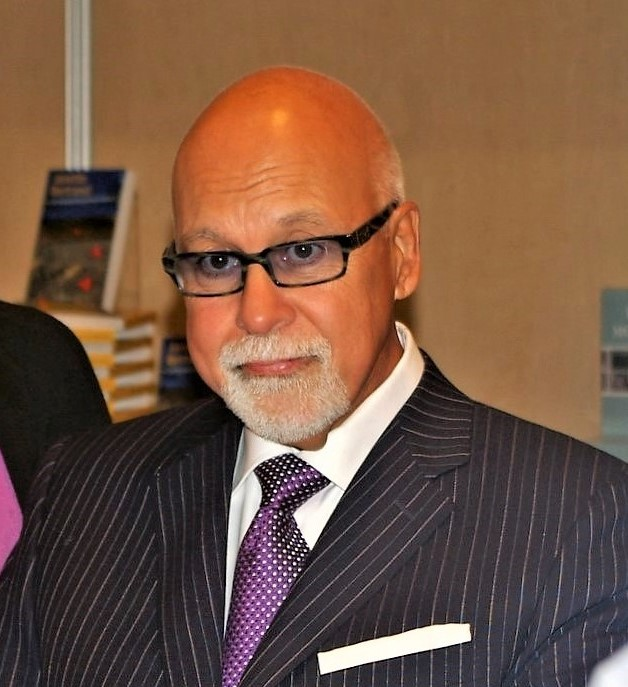
René Angélil died January 14

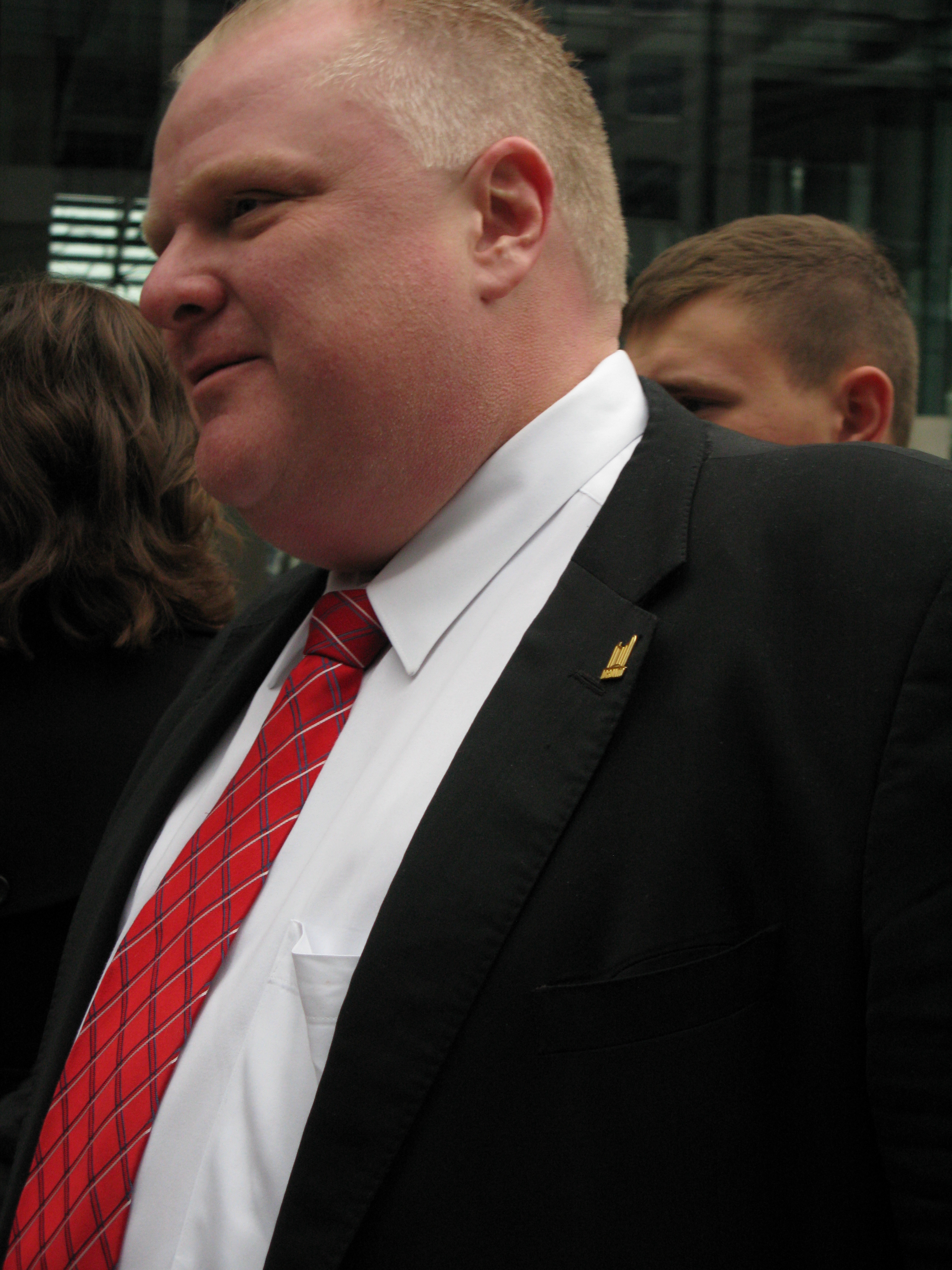
Rob Ford died March 22

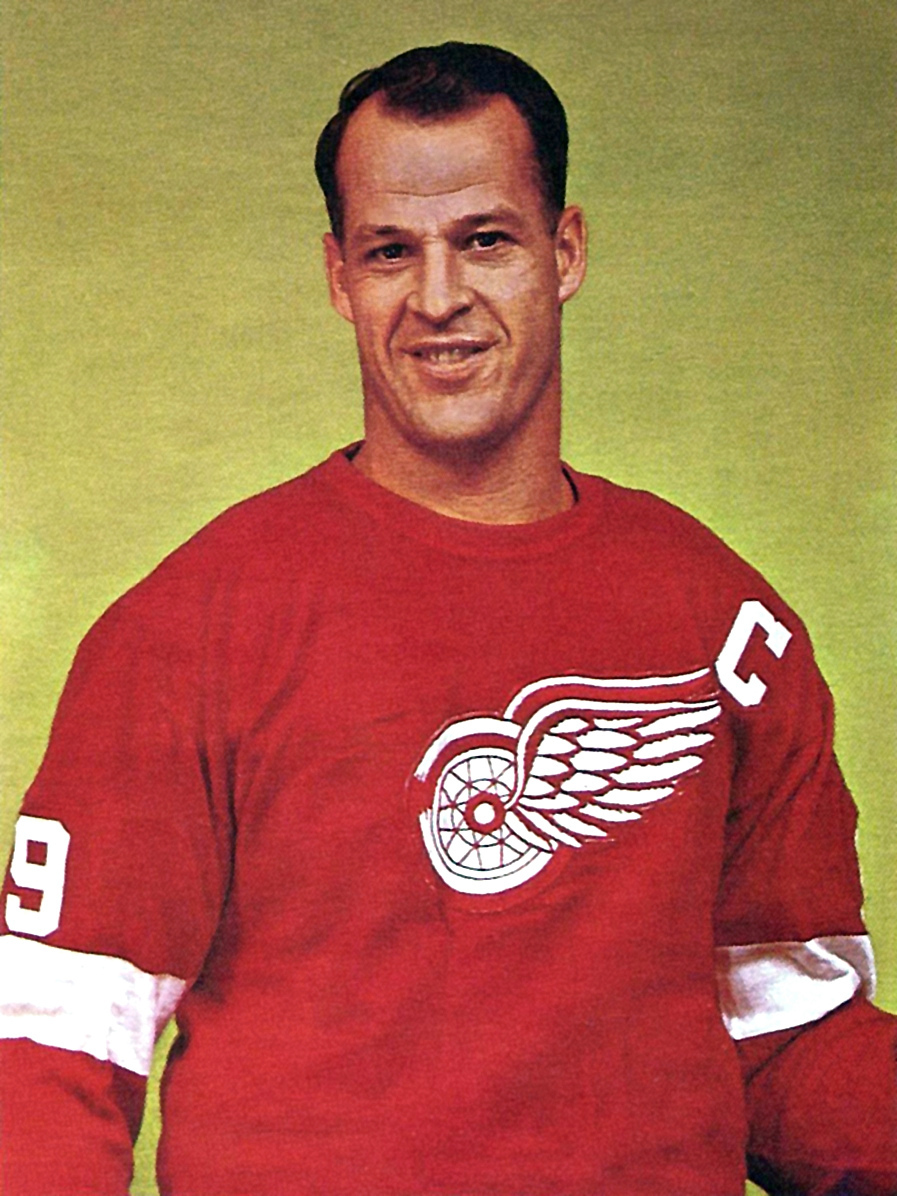
Gordie Howe died June 10

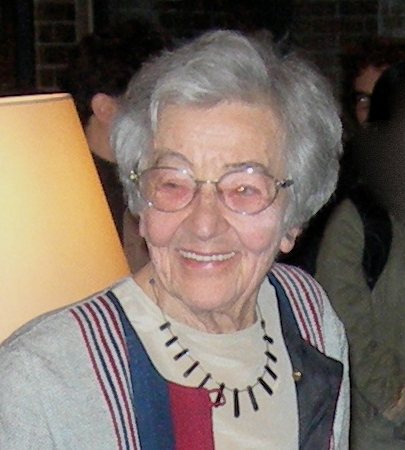
Ursula Franklin died July 22

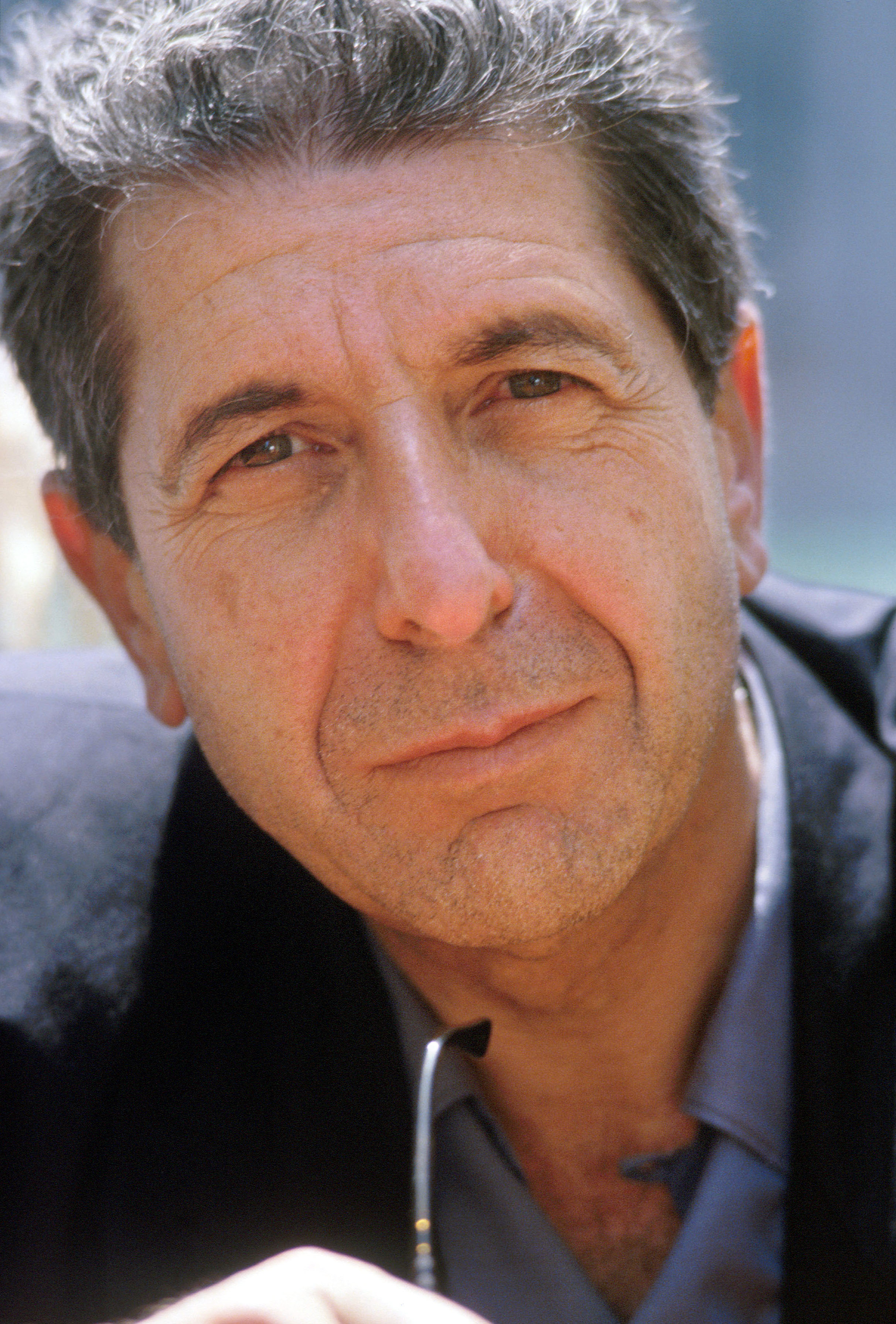
Leonard Cohen died November 7

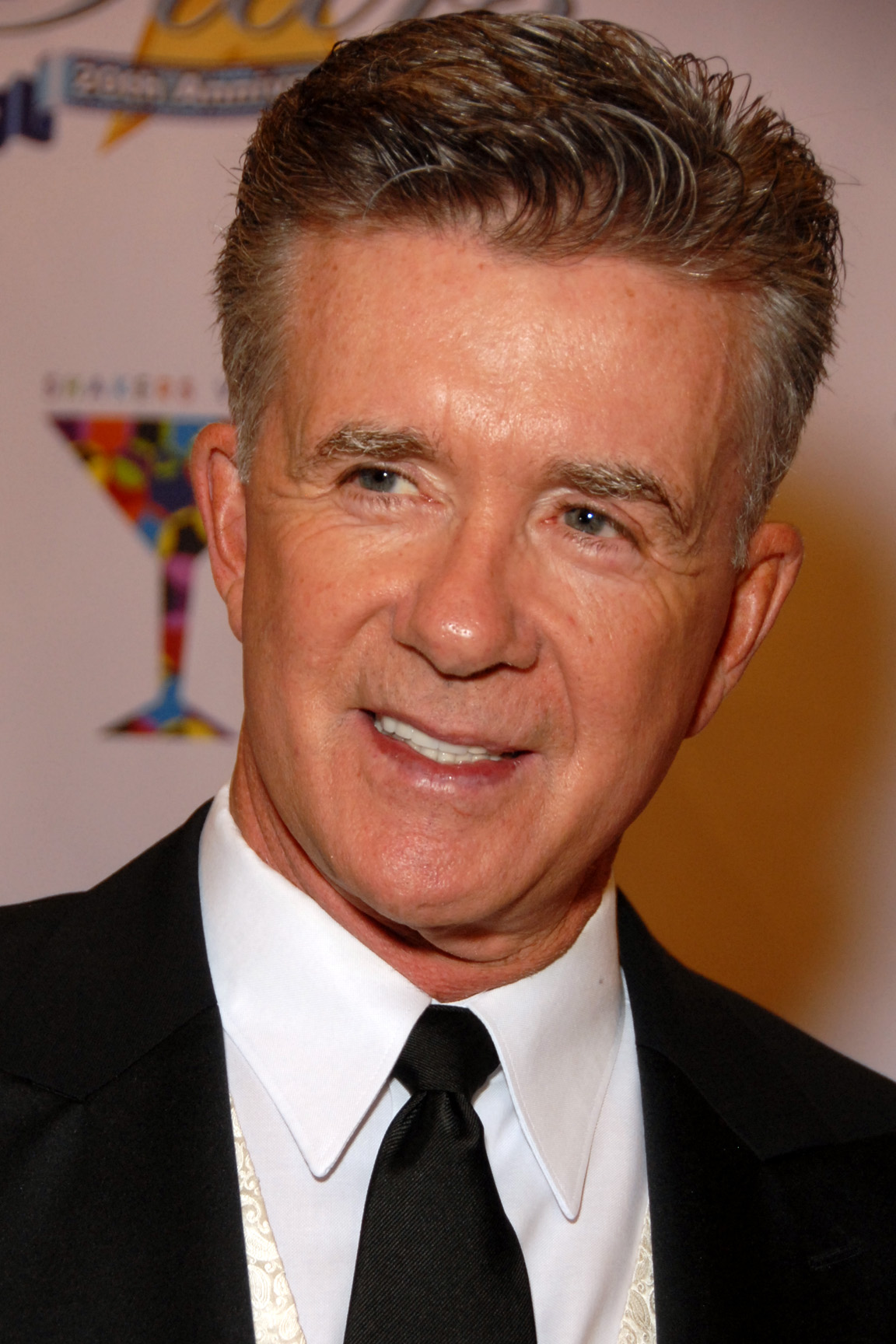
Alan Thicke died December 13

=== January ===
- January 1 – Jim Ross, 89, ice hockey player (New York Rangers) (b. 1926)
- January 2 –
  - Marcel Barbeau, 90, painter and sculptor (b. 1925)
  - Leonard Evans, 86, politician (b. 1929)
- January 3 –
  - Bill Plager, 70, ice hockey player (St. Louis Blues) (b. 1945)
  - Paul Bley, 83, jazz pianist (b. 1932)
- January 5 – Jean-Paul L'Allier, 77, politician, Mayor of Quebec City (1989–2005) (b. 1938)
- January 9 – John Harvard, 77, politician, Lieutenant Governor of Manitoba (2004–2009) (b. 1938)
- January 10 –
  - George Jonas, 80, Hungarian-b. writer (b. 1935)
  - Alexander Hickman, 90, judge and politician (b. 1925)
  - The Wolfman, 80, Hungarian-b. professional wrestler (WWWF) (b. 1935)
- January 11 –
  - Robert Coates, 87, politician, MP (1957–1988) (b. 1928)
  - Stanley Mann, 87, scriptwriter (The Collector, Conan the Destroyer, Firestarter) (b. 1928)
- January 12 – William Needles, 97, actor (b. 1919)
- January 14 – René Angélil, 73, entertainment manager (Celine Dion) (b. 1942)
- January 15 –
  - Daniel Joseph Bohan, 74, Roman Catholic prelate, Archbishop of Regina (since 2005) (b. 1941)
  - Avrom Isaacs, 89, art dealer (b. 1926)
- January 16 – Rudy Migay, 87, ice hockey player (Toronto Maple Leafs) (b. 1928)
- January 17 – Mike Sharpe, 64, professional wrestler (b. 1951)
- January 18 – Pierre DesRuisseaux, 70, poet (b. 1945)
- January 19 – Laurie Bower, 82, jazz and pop musician (b. 1933)
- January 20 –
  - Constance Beresford-Howe, 93, novelist (b. 1922)
  - Claude Lefebvre, 86, politician, Mayor of Laval, Quebec (1981–1989) (b. 1929)
- January 21 –
  - Garnet Richardson, 82, curler (b. 1933)
  - Val Sears, 88, journalist (Toronto Star) (b. 1927)
  - Ron Southern, 85, businessman (ATCO) (b. 1930)
- January 23 – Archie Gouldie, 79, professional wrestler (b. 1936)
- January 28 – François Barbeau, 80, costume designer (b. 1935)

=== February ===
- February 1 – Francis Buckley, 94, business executive (Buckley's) (b. 1921)
- February 2 – Lukasi Forrest, 19, actor (Uvanga)
- February 3 – Brad Kent, musician (D.O.A., Avengers), complications from pneumonia.
- February 6 – Gilles Brown, 73, singer (b. 1942)
- February 9 – Elizabeth Joan Smith, 88, politician, MPP for London South (1985–1990), brain injury from fall (b. 1927)
- February 11 – Ellison Kelly, 80, American-born football player (Hamilton Tiger-Cats) (b. 1935)
- February 15 –
  - Constance Glube, 84, judge, Chief Justice of Nova Scotia (1998–2004) (b. 1931)
  - Victor Goldbloom, 92, politician (b. 1923)
  - Vanity, 57, singer (Vanity 6), actress (The Last Dragon), and evangelist, renal failure (b. 1958)
- February 26 –
  - Andy Bathgate, 83, ice hockey player (New York Rangers) (b. 1932)
  - Don Getty, 82, politician, Premier of Alberta 1985–1992 (b. 1933)

=== March ===
- March 22 – Rob Ford, 46, politician, Mayor of Toronto 2010–2014 (b. 1969)
- March 23 – Jim Hillyer, 41, politician, MP (2011–2016) (b. 1974)
- March 29 – Jean Lapierre, 59, politician, MP (1979–1993; 2004–2007) (b. 1956)

=== April ===
- April 16 – Charlie Hodge, 82, ice hockey player

=== June ===
- June 10 – Gordie Howe, 88, ice hockey player (Detroit Red Wings) (b. 1928)

=== July ===
- July 22 – Ursula Franklin, 94, German-Canadian physicist (b. 1921)

=== August ===
- August 16 – Mauril Bélanger, 61, politician, MP (b. 1955).
- August 20 – Allen Rae, 83, basketball referee, FIBA Hall of Fame inductee (b. 1932).

=== September ===
- September 3 – Norman Kwong, 86, football player, businessman and politician
- September 16 – John Bentley Mays, 75, journalist

=== October ===
- October 1 – Daphne Odjig, 97, Canadian First Nations artist
- October 2 – Hanna Zora, 77, Iraqi-born Iranian-Canadian Chaldean Catholic hierarch, Archbishop of Ahwaz (1974–2011) and Mar Addai of Toronto (2011–2014).
- October 3 – Isobel Finnerty, 86, Canadian politician, senator (1999–2005).
- October 4 –
  - Hso Khan Pha, 78, Burmese-born Canadian geologist and exiled prince of Yawnghwe.
  - Jim Parrott, 74, Canadian politician, MLA for Fundy-River Valley (2010–2014).
  - Bing Thom, 75, Hong Kong–born Canadian architect, brain aneurysm.
- October 13 – Jim Prentice, 60, politician, Premier of Alberta 2014–2015 (b. 1956).
- October 18 – Fred Roots, 93, polar explorer and environmentalist (b. 1923).
- October 20 – Henry J. M. Barnett, CC, 94, physician, stroke researcher (b. 1922).

=== November ===
- November 1 – Dave Broadfoot, 90, comedian (Royal Canadian Air Farce) (b. 1925)
- November 7 – Leonard Cohen, 82, singer, songwriter, poet and novelist (b. 1934)
- November 14 – Janet Wright, 71, stage, television, actor, (Corner Gas) and director (b. 1945)

=== December ===
- December 13 – Alan Thicke, 69, actor and songwriter (b. 1947)
- December 30 – Rose Wolfe, 100, social worker and academic administrator (b. 1916)

== See also ==
- 2016 in Canadian television
- List of Canadian films of 2016
