= 2001 in Canada =

- Decades: 1980s; 1990s; 2000s; 2010s; 2020s
- See also: History of Canada; Timeline of Canadian history; List of years in Canada

Events from the year 2001 in Canada.

== Incumbents ==
Estimated Canadian population: 31,110,565

=== Crown ===
- Monarch – Elizabeth II

=== Federal government ===
- Governor General – Adrienne Clarkson
- Prime Minister – Jean Chrétien
- Chief Justice – Beverley McLachlin (British Columbia)
- Parliament – 37th (from January 29)

=== Provincial governments ===
==== Lieutenant governors ====
- Lieutenant Governor of Alberta – Lois Hole
- Lieutenant Governor of British Columbia – Garde Gardom (until September 25) then Iona Campagnolo
- Lieutenant Governor of Manitoba – Peter Liba
- Lieutenant Governor of New Brunswick – Marilyn Trenholme Counsell
- Lieutenant Governor of Newfoundland and Labrador – Arthur Maxwell House
- Lieutenant Governor of Nova Scotia – Myra Freeman
- Lieutenant Governor of Ontario – Hilary Weston
- Lieutenant Governor of Prince Edward Island – Gilbert Clements (until May 28) then Léonce Bernard
- Lieutenant Governor of Quebec – Lise Thibault
- Lieutenant Governor of Saskatchewan – Lynda Haverstock

==== Premiers ====
- Premier of Alberta – Ralph Klein
- Premier of British Columbia – Ujjal Dosanjh (until June 5) then Gordon Campbell
- Premier of Manitoba – Gary Doer
- Premier of New Brunswick – Bernard Lord
- Premier of Newfoundland and Labrador – Beaton Tulk (until February 13) then Roger Grimes
- Premier of Nova Scotia – John Hamm
- Premier of Ontario – Mike Harris
- Premier of Prince Edward Island – Pat Binns
- Premier of Quebec – Lucien Bouchard (until March 8) then Bernard Landry
- Premier of Saskatchewan – Roy Romanow (until February 8) then Lorne Calvert

=== Territorial governments ===
==== Commissioners ====
- Commissioner of Yukon – Jack Cable
- Commissioner of Northwest Territories – Glenna Hansen
- Commissioner of Nunavut – Peter Irniq

==== Premiers ====
- Premier of the Northwest Territories – Stephen Kakfwi
- Premier of Nunavut – Paul Okalik
- Premier of Yukon – Pat Duncan

== Events ==
=== January to March ===
- January 1 – The Ontario cities of Ottawa, Hamilton and Sudbury have their surrounding suburbs merged into their municipalities. Sudbury is the only one of the three to change its name (to Greater Sudbury). Toronto had been similarly merged in 1998.
- January 17 – The Bank of Canada unveils a new $10 bill with enhanced security features.
- January 18 – MafiaBoy pleads guilty to 56 of 66 mischief charges in a Montreal courtroom. The other 10 charges were withdrawn.
- January 27 – Lorne Calvert becomes the leader of the Saskatchewan New Democratic Party after winning the fourth ballot at the party's 2001 leadership convention.
- January 29 – Peter Milliken is elected as the new Speaker of the House of Commons after five rounds of voting.
- January 29 – The Toronto Stock Exchange allows company shares greater than $5 in value to trade at 1¢ increments instead of at 5¢ increments.
- January 30 – Governor General Adrienne Clarkson reads the Speech from the Throne at the beginning of the 37th Canadian parliament.
- January 30 – An envelope mailed to Citizenship and Immigration Minister Elinor Caplan containing a mysterious blue powder caused the Immigration Canada building to be sealed off. A Winnipeg laboratory on February 1 said the powder posed no health risk.
- February 2 – Canada begins banning imports of beef and beef products from Brazil due to concerns of mad cow disease.
- February 2 – Ontario Minister of Finance Ernie Eves quits to become vice-chair and senior adviser at Credit Suisse First Boston Canada.
- February 3 – Roger Grimes becomes leader of the Liberal Party of Newfoundland and Labrador after winning the second ballot at the party's leadership convention.
- February 5 – Prime Minister Jean Chrétien becomes the first foreign leader to visit the newly elected President of the United States, George W. Bush, in Washington, D.C.
- February 8 – Lorne Calvert becomes premier of Saskatchewan, replacing Roy Romanow.
- February 13 – Roger Grimes becomes premier of Newfoundland, replacing Beaton Tulk.
- March 8 – Bernard Landry becomes premier of Quebec, replacing Lucien Bouchard.
- March 12 – 2001 Alberta general election: Ralph Klein's PCs win a ninth consecutive majority.

=== April to June ===
- April 18 - Online only media rabble.ca is founded with well known media critic and feminist activist Judy Rebick as publisher.
- April 20 – Summit of the Americas is held in Quebec City to discuss the FTAA; the city, which has been divided by a high fence around much of the downtown core, also hosts the People's Summit and is wracked by the Quebec City protests.
- May 4 – Chrétien's longtime Chief of Staff, Jean Pelletier, is made the head of Via Rail.
- May 14 – Video lottery terminal referendum in New Brunswick.
- May 16 – British Columbia election: Gordon Campbell's BC Liberals win a landslide victory over Premier Ujjal Dosanjh's NDP.
- May 18 – Conrad Black renounces his Canadian citizenship.
- May 23 – Federal Ethics Commissioner releases a report which clears Alfonso Gagliano of any wrongdoing in the sponsorship scandal.
- June 5 – Gordon Campbell becomes premier of British Columbia, replacing Ujjal Dosanjh.

=== July to December ===
- July – Canada becomes the first country in the world to legalize medical marijuana.
- July 17 – Infighting in the Canadian Alliance forces out leader Stockwell Day.
- August 24 – Conrad Black sells The National Post to Izzy Asper's CanWest.
- August 24 – René Lévesque Bust unveiled.
- August 28 – The US Governors of New England agree with the Quebec and Atlantic Canadian premiers to the Climate Change Action Plan 2001.
- September 7 - Documentary Channel signs on.
- September 11 – Canada's border with the United States is on high alert in the aftermath of the terrorist attacks in the United States. Canadian government initiates both "Operation Support" and "Operation Yellow Ribbon."
- September 14 – Three days after the September 11 terrorist attacks, while the rest of the world sees the memorial service for the victims at the Washington National Cathedral, Canadians see the similar service on Parliament Hill—the largest single vigil ever seen in the nation's capital.
- October 7 – the 2001 Attack on Afghanistan begins. Canadian fighter pilots and ground troops are involved in the war.
- November 17 – Vancouver resident Aaron Webster is killed in what many believe to be a gay bashing attack.
- December 12 – The Royal Newfoundland Constabulary arrests Dr. Shirley Turner in St. John's on suspicion of murdering her boyfriend Andrew Bagby in Pennsylvania. However, Justice Gale Welsh releases Turner deeming her not a threat to society, despite the murder charges.

=== Full date unknown ===
- Canadian Coalition for Global Health Research is founded.
- Chris Hadfield becomes the first Canadian to perform a spacewalk.
- CTV purchases The Globe and Mail.
- Jean Drapeau Statue unveiled.

== Arts and literature ==
- March 4 – Bruce Cockburn is inducted into the Canadian Music Hall of Fame.

=== New literature ===
- Discipline of Power: Jeffrey Simpson
- Dolce Agonia: Nancy Huston
- Eunoia: Christian Bök
- Life of Pi: Yann Martel
- Shadows: Timothy Findley
- Stanley Park: Timothy Taylor
- The Stone Carvers: Jane Urquhart

=== Literary awards ===
- Alistair MacLeod's No Great Mischief wins the lucrative International Dublin Literary Award
- Giller Prize for Canadian Fiction: Richard B. Wright: Clara Callan
- See 2001 Governor General's Awards for a complete list of winners and finalists for those awards.
- Books in Canada First Novel Award: Michael Redhill, Martin Sloane
- Geoffrey Bilson Award: Sharon McKay, Charlie Wilcox
- Gerald Lampert Award: Anne Simpson, Light Falls Through You
- Griffin Poetry Prize: Anne Carson, Men in the Off Hours
- Marian Engel Award: Elizabeth Hay
- Matt Cohen Prize: Mavis Gallant
- Norma Fleck Award: Gena K. Gorrell, Heart and Soul: The Story of Florence Nightingale
- Pat Lowther Award: Sharon Thesen, A Pair of Scissors
- Stephen Leacock Award: Stuart McLean, Vinyl Café Unplugged
- Trillium Book Award English: Richard B. Wright, Clara Callan
- Trillium Book Award French: Michèle Matteau, Cognac et Porto
- Vicky Metcalf Award: Linda Granfield

=== New music ===
- All Killer No Filler: Sum 41
- Back to the Mansion: April Wine
- Pretty Together: Sloan
- Silver Side Up: Nickelback
- Ten New Songs: Leonard Cohen

=== Film ===
- Atanarjuat: The Fast Runner wins the Golden Reel for Best First Feature at Cannes

=== Television ===
- Rick Mercer leaves This Hour Has 22 Minutes, then is replaced by Colin Mochrie
- Kevin Newman anchors Global Television Network's national newscast, Global National, beginning days before 9/11.

== Sport ==
- January 31 – George N. Gillett Jr. buys 80% of the Montreal Canadiens and 100% of the Molson Centre in Montreal for US$275 million.
- February 3 – Catriona Le May Doan wins gold in the 500 m and 1000 m speed skating races in Heerenveen, Netherlands.
- April 18 – The Vancouver Grizzlies play their final game as Canadian-based team, winning over the Golden State Warriors 95–81. The team moved to Memphis later in 2001.
- May 27 - The Red Deer Rebels win their first Memorial Cup by defeating Val-d'Or Foreurs 6 to 5. The tournament was played at Agridome in Regina, Saskatchewan
- June 9 - Burnaby, British Columbia's Joe Sakic of the Colorado Avalanche is awarded the Conn Smythe Trophy
- November 25 – The Calgary Stampeders win their fifth Grey Cup by defeating the Winnipeg Blue Bombers 27 to 19 in the 89th Grey Cup played at Olympic Stadium in Montreal
- December 1 - The Saint Mary's Huskies win their second Vanier Cup by defeating the Manitoba Bisons by a score of 42–16 in the 37th Vanier Cup played at Skydome in Toronto

== Births ==
- March 6 – Aryana Engineer, actress
- March 9 – Jeon So-mi, singer, member of I.O.I
- May 8 – Jordyn Huitema, soccer player
- May 12 – John Paul Ruttan, actor
- May 26 – Megan Charpentier, actress
- July 8 – Riele Downs, child actress
- July 22 – Alisha Newton, actress
- July 26 – Ludovick Choquette, football player
- October 3 – Keelan White, football player
- October 5 – Dalila Bela, actress
- October 8 – Percy Hynes White, Canadian actor
- October 9 – Kyla Leibel, swimmer
- October 11 – Alexis Lafrenière, ice hockey player
- October 17 – Jake Beale, actor
- November 7 – Amybeth McNulty, actress

== Deaths ==
=== January to March ===
- January 13 – Michael Cuccione, child actor and cancer research activist (born 1985)
- January 18 – Al Waxman, actor and director (born 1935)
- January 31 – Gordon R. Dickson, science fiction author (born 1923)
- February 1 – Gaelyne Gabora, soprano and music teacher (born 1931)
- February 5 – David Iftody, politician (born 1956)
- February 28 – Gildas Molgat, politician (born 1927)
- March 8 – Frances Adaskin, pianist (b. 1900)
- March 23
  - Louis Dudek, poet, literary critic and publisher (born 1918)
  - David McTaggart, environmentalist (born 1932)
- March 28 – Moe Koffman, flautist and saxophonist, cancer (born 1928)

=== April to June ===
- April 2 – Charles Daudelin, sculptor and painter (born 1920)
- April 16 – Horace Gwynne, boxer and Olympic gold medalist (born 1913)
- May 5 – Aba Bayefsky, artist and teacher (born 1923)
- June – Gordon Donaldson, author and journalist (b.1926)
- June 3 – Maurice Breton, politician and lawyer (born 1909)
- June 7 – Charles Templeton, cartoonist, evangelist, agnostic, politician, newspaper editor, inventor, broadcaster and author (born 1915)
- June 19 – William Austin Forsyth, politician (born (1917)
- June 23 – Yvonne Dionne, one of the Dionne quintuplets (born 1934)

=== July to December ===
- July 3 – Mordecai Richler, author, screenwriter and essayist (born 1931)
- July 24 – Georges Dor, author, composer, playwright, singer, poet, translator and theatrical producer and director (born 1931)
- August 9 – Kimberly Rogers, Sudbury woman whose suicide while under house arrest for a disputed welfare fraud conviction led to a major scandal and inquest (b. c1961)
- September 18 – Ernie Coombs, children's entertainer Mr. Dressup (born 1927)
- November 19 – Marcelle Ferron, painter and stained glass artist (born 1924)
- November 24 – Donald McPherson, figure skater (born 1945)
- December 14 – Pauline Mills McGibbon, politician and 22nd Lieutenant-Governor of Ontario (born 1910)

=== Full date unknown ===
- Gordon Donaldson, author and journalist (born 1926)

== See also ==
- 2001 in Canadian television
- List of Canadian films of 2001
