= Richard Butler (publisher) =

- Born: 11 November 1834; Coteau du Lac, Lower Canada
- Died: 16 March 1925 (aged 90)
- Occupation: Publisher

Richard Butler (born 11 November 1834 at Coteau du Lac, Lower Canada - 16 March 1925) was an editor, publisher, journalist and U.S. vice-consul in Hamilton, Ontario.

== Life ==
His parents had been born in Ireland and arrived in Canada a few months before his birth. He worked from childhood, so he had little formal education. He worked first as a confectioner and baker in Montreal, and secured a job with the Montreal Herald when he was twelve years old. This enabled him to help his mother raise Butler and his three siblings, after his father had died suddenly when serving in the British 24th Foot Regiment stationed in Canada.

His experience working for newspapers continued after the family moved to London, Ontario, where he found work for the London Free Press. He also gained experience in Hamilton working at the Journal and Express office. Butler moved to the United States in 1852 at the age of seventeen, working in Rochester, New York for the Rochester Union. In 1854 he returned to Hamilton, where he helped establish a union for printers. By 1859 he had worked his way up to an assistant foreman at the Christian Advocate.

He returned to the United States in time to be listed in the 1860 census as a resident of Cincinnati, Ohio, where he worked as a printer.

In 1862, he became editor of the Oxford Citizen, a newspaper in Oxford, Ohio, which he sold in 1870. He also operated a printing business there. During his Oxford years, Butler was active in a fraternal temperance society called the Good Templars and spent a few months in the Union Army. In 1915 he published a short history of early Oxford called Ancient Oxford. First appearing in a newspaper, it was later published as a short book.

In 1870, Butler bought a newspaper in Oberlin, Ohio which proved to be a mistake. Oberlin College wanted a religious paper. After two years Butler sold the newspaper, and shortly afterwards became city editor of the Burlington Hawkeye in Burlington, Iowa. Eventually he moved to Illinois, where he bought the Clinton Public and was its editor and publisher for twenty-five years.

In 1897, after selling the Public, he returned to Canada once again where (as an ardent Republican) he was appointed to the position of U.S. vice-consul in the Ontario city of Hamilton, a position he held for eighteen years. At the same time was employed by the town's newspaper, the Hamilton Spectator, and wrote a column on the history of Hamilton for the Saturday edition of the paper, titled "Saturday Musings". The column appeared under the pen name of The Muser.

== Tribute ==
The Butler neighbourhood in Hamilton Mountain is named after him. It is bounded by Stone Church Road East (north), Rymal Road East (south), Upper Wentworth Street (west) and Upper Sherman Street (east). Landmarks in this neighbourhood include St. Jean de Brebeuf High School and Billy Sherring Park.
