= Neil McKenty =

Canadian radio broadcaster

Neil McKenty (December 31, 1924 – May 12, 2012) was an English-Canadian radio and television broadcaster and author.

== Personal life ==
The son of a hardware store owner, McKenty was raised in Hastings, Ontario, near Peterborough. He was schooled at a Jesuit boarding school in Kingston, Ontario.

He was educated at the University of Toronto, where he earned a bachelor's degree in Canadian history, and the University of Michigan, achieving a master's in communications.

For fifteen years, he was a teacher and ordained priest with the Jesuit order. He was on the editorial staff of the Jesuit weekly America and wrote a much-acclaimed biography of former Ontario Premier Mitch Hepburn. In 1970, McKenty left the Jesuits and accepted a position doing public relations with the Special Olympics. He met his wife, Catharine, on the dance floor and married her just ten days later.

McKenty died at Montreal General Hospital on May 12, 2012, at the age of 87, after a short illness. A former colleague eulogized him as "one of the most complicated and interesting men who ever lived."

== Broadcasting career ==
In October 1972, he moved from Toronto to Montreal to work as a talk show host for CJAD AM radio. Initially working as the station's editorialist, he later co-hosted a 60-minute phone-in show with Helen Gougeon.

In 1977 he began working solo, and his two-hour morning show Exchange almost immediately became the city's top-rated phone-in program. He described Exchange as a radio "town meeting" and "people talking over their clotheslines in the backyard." His signature line was "the lines are blazing." The show achieved its peak ratings—about 75,000 regular listeners—in 1985 when he decided to leave and write books instead. He returned to broadcasting when his television phone-in talk show, McKenty Live, on CFCF-TV, debuted in September 1987; it ran for three seasons until 1990, when he decided to focus on writing once again.

He interviewed many Canadian political leaders.

At the time of the passage of Bill 101 making French the only official language of Quebec, McKenty declined to denounce the law entirely. He claimed that the purported aim of the bill, more respect for French-speaking Quebecers, was just. He is credited with being a voice of moderation who sought to build linguistic bridges during a time when Quebec separatism was at its peak.

In 2008, he started a blog on current affairs at www.neilmckenty.com. After his death, friends decided to maintain the blog and add archival radio and television clips to it.

== Bibliography ==
He left radio broadcasting in 1985 to write In the Stillness Dancing: The Journey of John Main, a biography of Benedictine monk John Main, published in 1986. It received mostly a positive response from critics. He went on to write a biography of Toronto mayor R. J. Fleming.

Together with his wife Catharine, McKenty (née Fleming) wrote Skiing Legends and the Laurentian Lodge Club (2001), an historical account of a social and skiing club in the Laurentian Mountains.

In all, McKenty wrote five titles, both non-fiction (the two biographies, a well-regarded memoir (The Inside Story: Journey of a Former Jesuit Priest and Talkshow Host Towards Self-Discovery), the skiing club history) and fiction (a murder mystery, The Other Key: An Inspector Julian Main Mystery).

== Quebec Canada Committee ==
In 1992, he toured Canada as co-founder (with businessman John Hallward) of the Quebec Canada Committee to promote the idea of a unified Canada, building bridges between French and English Canada during the lead-up to the Charlottetown Accord constitution amendment proposals.
