= Canadian Coalition for Global Health Research =

Canadian charity

The Canadian Coalition for Global Health Research is a Canada-based health charity.

== History ==
The CCGHR, a registered Canadian charity, governed by a volunteer Board of Directors, began in 2001 as an informal network and evolved through support from the Canadian International Development Agency, the Canadian Institutes of Health Research, and other foundations.
