= Percy Reid =

Percy Reid (1874 - November 14, 1927) was gold commissioner of Yukon, Canada, between 1925 and 1927.

Born in Prince Edward Island, Reid moved to the Yukon in 1898, attracted by the prospects of the Klondike Gold Rush. In 1899, he began working for the local government as a mining recorder. He remained in this position for several years, before moving to the Immigration Department.

In 1921 and 1922, Reid travelled to China, to deal with questions of Chinese immigration and to open immigration offices there. He was appointed Commissioner of the Yukon in 1924, succeeding George P. MacKenzie. He served in this position from 1925 until his death in 1927. He was followed by George Ian MacLean.
