= 33rd Finale des Jeux de l'Acadie =

2012 sports event in Nova Scotia

33rd Finale des Jeux de l'Acadie 2012
- Host city: Municipality of Argyle
- Motto: Your participation clamps our hearts
- Athletes: 1000+
- Events: 8
- Website: www.jeuxdelacadie.org/2012

The 33rd Finale des Jeux de l'Acadie were held from June 29 to July 3, 2012 in the Municipality of Argyle, Nova Scotia. This marked only the second time in the 32-year history of the Acadian Games that Nova Scotia hosted a Finale with Argyle being the first rural area of the province to so.

== The Municipality of Argyle ==
The region of Par-en-Bas embraces all the Lobster Bay are of southwestern Nova Scotia. With 6240 French-speaking inhabitants of a total population estimated at 9,000 people, Par-en-Bas is one of the two areas of the Province (the other is Clare) where Francophones are the majority.

Its location at the southwestern extreme of Nova Scotia along with the moderating effects of the maritime climate generates some of the mildest winters in the province. The spring and summer are relatively cool and often tinged with fog created by the meeting of the warm currents of the Gulf Stream and the colder Labrador Current.

== La Finale ==
=== Sports ===
Here is the current sports programming in the Jeux de l'Acadie:

- Athletics
- Badminton
- Basketball
- Mini handball
- Softball
- Soccer
- Tennis
- Volleyball

An educational component consists of a sport selected by the host municipality through its Organizing Committee (COFJA). The goals of this component are to raise awareness about a sport little known or poorly developed in the eight regions making up the League of the Acadian Games inc. and initiating the Francophone youth to practice different sports. Sports already on the agenda of the Acadian Games are excluded from this component.

Participation in the educational component is for everyone (parents, spectators, officials, coaches,...). Priority is always given to accredited sports athletes registered for the Jeux de l'Acadie.

This year, the educational component will be:

- Golf

=== Calendar ===
Here is the calendar for the Finale.

General Calendar of the 33rd Finale des Jeux de l'Acadie 2012
June - July 2012	29	30	1	2	3
Ceremonies		O			C
Athletics					
Badminton					
Basketball					
Mini handball					
Soccer					
Softball					
Tennis					
Volleyball					
June - July 2012	29	30	1	2	3

Ceremonies	Event competition	Event finals
