= Lucien Laferte =

Canadian ski jumper

Lucien Laferté, known as the Flying Cowboy (March 19, 1919 – November 14, 2012) was a Canadian ski jumper who competed from after World War II into the 1950s. He was born in Saint-François-du-Lac, Quebec.

He won the Canadian Championship in 1947 in Revelstoke, British Columbia and finished 41st in the individual large hill event at the 1952 Winter Olympics in Oslo. He lived in Trois-Rivières, Québec all his life and married Denise Trépanier on January 20, 1950.
