= Alfred Kunz (composer) =

- Born: Alfred Leopold Kunz; May 26, 1929; Neudorf, Saskatchewan
- Died: January 16, 2019 (aged 89) Kitchener, Ontario
- Occupations: Composer, conductor

Alfred Leopold Kunz (26 May 1929 – 16 January 2019) was a German-Canadian composer, conductor, and arts administrator from New Hamburg, Ontario.

== Early life ==
Kunz was born in Neudorf, Saskatchewan, and grew up in this rural area. He later moved with his family to Kitchener where he took private music lessons. He studied at Toronto Conservatory of Music as well as privately in composition and conducting in Toronto from 1949 to 1955. In 1965 he completed the state examinations in choral conducting at the Musikhochschule Mainz and was assistant conductor of the opera of the Staatstheater Mainz.

== Career ==
Kunz began teaching music in Kitchener, Ontario, in 1955. In 1959, he founded the Kitchener-Waterloo Chamber Music Orchestra and Choir. He worked at several factory jobs before being hired as director of music at the University of Waterloo, a position he held for fifteen years.

In 1965, Kunz became the founding conductor of the Concordia Club Choir, and continued in this position until 2013. He directed the Waterloo Regional Police Male Chorus from 1973 to 1984. In 1985 he founded the Millennium Choir, and served as its director until 2015.

Throughout his career Kunz composed hundreds of musical works, many for unaccompanied choir. He received an honorary Doctor of Laws from the University of Waterloo on June 14, 2001.

Kunz resided in New Hamburg near Baden, Ontario; he continued to organize community choral activities until his health deteriorated in 2017. He died on January 16, 2019, following a heart illness. His papers have been archived at the Waterloo University library.
