= Mary Borgstrom =

Canadian potter, ceramist, and artist (1916–2019)

- Born: May 18, 1916; Saskatchewan, Canada
- Died: April 3, 2019 (aged 102); Provost, Alberta, Canada
- Education: Self-taught
- Known for: Pottery
- Awards: Canadian Guild of Crafts Quebec, Award of Excellence

Mary Borgstrom (May 18, 1916 – April 3, 2019) was a Canadian potter, ceramist, and artist who specialized in primitive techniques. She was presented with the "Award of Excellence" by the Canadian Guild of Crafts in Quebec.

== Life ==
Borgstrom was born in Saskatchewan in 1916, and later moved to Provost, Alberta.

I gathered all my own clay. Just anywhere. But you get so you know that all clay isn't equal. [Some has good sand] in it that you can use. But there's also sand that the pottery won't hold together. And you get so you know your clay; you know your soil.

— Mary Borgstrom

In Edmonton, Alberta in the mid-1960s, she attended a workshop on primitive pottery offered by the ceramist Hal Riegger, getting exposed to techniques of the craft. Shortly thereafter in the late 1960s and early 1970s, she "emerged as one of the most unique ceramic talents in Alberta". Her artwork was shown world-wide, and appeared in numerous collections and exhibitions.

In 1976, Borgstrom was invited to participate in the Arts and Culture program in the 1976 Summer Olympics in Montreal.

Borgstrom died on April 3, 2019, at the age of 102 at the Provost Health Centre in Provost, Alberta.

Open, direct firing suits my farm and country background, my temperament and my pocket book. An intimate love affair with the great out doors and an insatiable curiosity about Mother Earth makes the search for local clays not only a challenge but an adventure of sheer pleasure and unexplainable fascination. And so -- my involvement in Primitive Pottery is about as total as is possible, almost to the exclusion of all else. Almost! An overly fertile mind -- an explosion of ideas within one Life Span and Time holding a Stop Watch on the impossible dream. There has to be another world -- another lifetime.

— Mary Borgstrom

== Reviews and awards ==
- Virginia J Watt, a director at the Canadian Guild of Crafts stated: "In all of her work, she maintains a sober austerity that gives her primitive style its purity and sophistication."
- Alberta Art Foundation, on her work "Her piece ... represents the unique development of civilization on the Canadian prairies."
- The Canadian Guild of Crafts Quebec presented Mary with the "Award of Excellence".
- Eileen Lewenstein and Emmanuel Cooper in "New Ceramics" stated: "Mary Borgstrom, who lives in a rural area of Alberta, has led many people to an interest in primitive pottery."

== Creative process ==
Often claiming to be inspired by the natural landscape, Borgstrom scavenged for her own artistic materials in the nature surrounding her childhood home. This included the cultivation of clay. Here, Borgstrom created her pottery workshop later in her life. Borgstrom attests to working within a "primitive technique" of pottery and clay making. This technique, often called "primitive firing" is a process in which a potter employs the use of a handmade raku kiln. This practice includes the firing of clay works, called raku ware, at extremely hot temperatures for prolonged periods of time. This process allows for a sense of "artistic closeness" between the artist and the works.

== Art market ==
In January 2019, Mary Borgstrom's home and personal workshop were bought and restored by Alex Archbold of Curiosity Incorporated. Archbold insured surviving works, preparing them for the private art market, where they were insured for up to US$10,000.

== Exhibitions ==
In 1971, twenty-five of Borgstrom's clay works were exhibited at the Canadian Guild of Handicrafts acquired by the Montreal Museum of Fine Art, resulting in an invitation to attend the Arts and Culture Program at the 1976 Summer Olympics held in Montreal, Canada. Borgstrom's works are held internationally in Japanese and English collections. Several of Borgstrom's pieces are currently on display across Canadian galleries including the Art Gallery of Alberta and the National Gallery of Canada.
