= Val Sears =

Canadian journalist

Val Sears (December 5, 1927 – January 21, 2016) was a Canadian journalist. He was a reporter, editor, Ottawa Bureau Chief and foreign correspondent in London, England and Washington, D.C. for the Toronto Star. Sears won numerous awards for his reporting including a National Newspaper Award for feature writing and for news as well as a science writing Award. He is author of the book Hello Sweetheart: Get Me Rewrite, which is an account of the 1950s newspaper wars between the Toronto Telegram and the Toronto Star, both of which employed him. After retiring from the Toronto Star, Sears became a columnist for the Ottawa Sun from 1998 to 2005.

In 1991, Sears accepted the Bell Chair as visiting professor of journalism at the University of Regina. In 1999 he was made a lifetime member of the Ottawa Press Gallery.

Sears was the father of Robin Sears, a communications, marketing and public affairs advisor, and of Kit Melamed, a producer for the Canadian Broadcasting Corporation investigative journalism program, the Fifth Estate. He was married to Edith Cody-Rice, senior legal counsel for the Canadian Broadcasting Corporation. He died in Almonte, Ontario, on January 21, 2016, aged 88.
