= 1933 in Canada =

- Decades: 1910s; 1920s; 1930s; 1940s; 1950s
- See also: History of Canada; Timeline of Canadian history; List of years in Canada

Events from the year 1933 in Canada.

== Incumbents ==
=== Crown ===
- Monarch – George V

=== Federal government ===
- Governor General – Vere Ponsonby, 9th Earl of Bessborough
- Prime Minister – Richard Bedford Bennett
- Chief Justice – Francis Alexander Anglin (Ontario) (until 28 February) then Lyman Poore Duff (British Columbia)
- Parliament – 17th

=== Provincial governments ===
==== Lieutenant governors ====
- Lieutenant Governor of Alberta – William Legh Walsh
- Lieutenant Governor of British Columbia – John William Fordham Johnson
- Lieutenant Governor of Manitoba – James Duncan McGregor
- Lieutenant Governor of New Brunswick – Hugh Havelock McLean
- Lieutenant Governor of Nova Scotia – Walter Harold Covert
- Lieutenant Governor of Ontario – Herbert Alexander Bruce
- Lieutenant Governor of Prince Edward Island – Charles Dalton (until December 9) then George Des Brisay de Blois (from December 28)
- Lieutenant Governor of Quebec – Henry George Carroll
- Lieutenant Governor of Saskatchewan – Hugh Edwin Munroe

==== Premiers ====
- Premier of Alberta – John Edward Brownlee
- Premier of British Columbia – Simon Fraser Tolmie (until November 15) then Duff Pattullo
- Premier of Manitoba – John Bracken
- Premier of New Brunswick – Charles Dow Richards (until June 1) then Leonard Tilley
- Premier of Nova Scotia – Gordon Sidney Harrington (until September 5) then Angus Lewis Macdonald
- Premier of Ontario – George Stewart Henry
- Premier of Prince Edward Island – James D. Stewart (until October 10) then William J. P. MacMillan (from October 14)
- Premier of Quebec – Louis-Alexandre Taschereau
- Premier of Saskatchewan – James Thomas Milton Anderson

=== Territorial governments ===
==== Commissioners ====
- Controller of Yukon – George A. Jeckell
- Commissioner of Northwest Territories – Hugh Rowatt

== Events ==
- April 7 – Raymond Paley becomes the first known skiing fatality in the Canadian Rockies on Fossil Mountain.
- June 1 – Leonard Tilley becomes premier of New Brunswick, replacing Charles Richards
- August 16 – The Christie Pits riot between Jews and Nazi sympathizers in Toronto.
- September 5 – Angus Macdonald becomes premier of Nova Scotia, replacing Gordon Harrington
- October 14 – W. J. P. MacMillan becomes premier of Prince Edward Island, replacing James D. Stewart
- November 11 – The magnitude 7.3 Baffin Bay earthquake occurs at Baffin Bay, Northwest Territories.
- November 15 – Thomas Pattullo becomes premier of British Columbia, replacing Simon Fraser Tolmie
- December 2 – Newfoundland's independence is revoked due to its financial difficulties.

== Sport ==
- April 6 – The Ontario Hockey Association's Newmarket Redmen win their first Memorial Cup by defeating the South Saskatchewan Junior Hockey League's Regina Pats 2 games to 0. All games were played at Maple Leaf Gardens in Toronto
- December 9 – The Toronto Argonauts win their third Grey Cup by defeating the Sarnia Imperials 4–3 at Sarnia's Davis Field
- December 12 – Eddie Shore of the Boston Bruins hits Ace Bailey of the Toronto Maple Leafs. Bailey lands head first, and severe head trauma ends his career. The Ace Bailey Benefit Game, a forerunner of the NHL All-Star Game, is played on February 14, 1934.

== Births ==
=== January to March ===
- January 24 – Claude Préfontaine, actor (d. 2013)
- January 25
  - Anne Innis Dagg, zoologist and feminist (d. 2024)
  - Alden Nowlan, poet, novelist, playwright and journalist (d. 1983)
- January 31 – Camille Henry, ice hockey player (d. 1997)
- February 13 – Michael Cook, playwright (d. 1994)
- February 16 – Tom Hickey, Canadian politician (d. 2020)
- February 18 – Frank Moores, businessman, politician and 2nd Premier of Newfoundland (d. 2005)
- February 24 – Gustavo Da Roza, architect
- March 2 – Simonie Michael, Inuk politician (d. 2008)
- March 4 – James Jerome, jurist, politician and Speaker of the House of Commons of Canada (d. 2005)
- March 9 – Mel Lastman, businessman, politician and Mayor of Toronto (d. 2021)
- March 19
  - John Sopinka, lawyer and puisne justice on the Supreme Court of Canada (d. 1997)
  - Richard Williams, Canadian-British animator (d. 2019)
- March 23 – Thomas R. Berger, politician and jurist (d. 2021)
- March 29 – Jacques Brault, poet and translator (d. 2022)

=== April to June ===
- April 5 – Joe Comuzzi, politician (d. 2022)
- April 19
  - Peter Demeter, murderer
  - Garry Blaine, ice hockey player (d. 1998)
- April 24 – Alan Eagleson, disbarred lawyer, convicted felon, former politician, hockey agent and promoter
- May 24 – Marian Engel, novelist (d. 1985)
- May 29 – Marc Carbonneau, taxi driver and convicted kidnapper
- June 19 – Michael M. Ames, anthropologist and academic (d. 2006)
- June 24
  - Bob Cole, sports television announcer (d. 2024)
  - Bernard Grandmaître, politician
- June 26 – Gerry Weiner, politician
- June 28
  - Antonio Flamand, politician
  - Gisèle Lalonde, politician and community activist, mayor of Vanier, Ontario (1985–1992) (d. 2022)
- June 30
  - Don Head, ice hockey player
  - Orval Tessier, ice hockey centre and coach (d. 2022)

=== July to September ===
- July 2 – Kenny Wharram, ice hockey player (d. 2017)
- July 8 – Antonio Lamer, lawyer, jurist and 16th Chief Justice of Canada (d. 2007)
- July 13 – Scott Symons, writer (d. 2009)
- July 14 – Robert Bourassa, politician and 22nd Premier of Quebec (d. 1996)
- July 16 – Julian Klymkiw, ice hockey goaltender (d. 2022)
- July 17 – Mimi Hines, singer and comedian
- July 28
  - David Ahenakew, politician (d. 2010)
  - Charlie Hodge, ice hockey goaltender (d. 2016)
- August 13 – Ted Godwin, artist (d. 2013)
- August 24 – John Alan Lee, sociologist (d. 2013)
- August 30 – Don Getty, politician and 11th Premier of Alberta (d. 2016)
- August 31 – Laurie Bower, jazz and pop singer (d. 2016)
- September 8 – Maurice Foster, politician, MP for Algoma (1968–1993) (d. 2010)
- September 19 – Gilles Archambault, novelist

=== October to December ===
- October 12 – Guido Molinari, artist (d. 2004)
- October 22 – David Bromige, poet (d. 2009)
- November 16 – Leonard Marchand, politician (d. 2016)
- November 26 – Robert Goulet, singer and actor (d. 2007)
- November 27 – Jacques Godbout, novelist, essayist, children's writer, journalist, filmmaker and poet
- December 1 – Alex Campbell, politician and Premier of Prince Edward Island
- December 12 – Joe Borowski, politician and activist (d. 1996)
- December 25 – Fred Sasakamoose, ice hockey player (d. 2020)

=== Full date unknown ===
- Harry Flemming, journalist (d. 2008)
- Doreen Kimura, psychologist who was professor at Simon Fraser University (d. 2013)

== Deaths ==
- January 3 – Jack Pickford, actor (b. 1896)
- April 14 – Daniel Hunter McMillan, politician and Lieutenant-Governor of Manitoba (b. 1846)
- October 10 – James David Stewart, educator, lawyer, politician and Premier of Prince Edward Island (b. 1874)
- October 17 – Emily Murphy, women's rights activist, jurist and author, first woman magistrate in Canada and in the British Empire (b. 1868)
- October 25 – William John Bowser, politician and Premier of British Columbia (b. 1867)
- November 30 – Arthur Currie, World War I general (b. 1875)

== See also ==
- List of Canadian films
