= Colleen Thibaudeau =

Canadian poet and story-writer (1925–2012)

- Born: December 29, 1925; Toronto, Ontario, Canada
- Died: February 6, 2012 (aged 86); London, Ontario, Canada
- Education: University of Toronto
- Occupations: Short-story writer; Poet
- Years active: 1951–1992
- Spouse: James Reaney (m. 1951; died 2008)
- Children: 2

Colleen Thibaudeau (December 29, 1925 – February 6, 2012) was a Canadian poet and short-story writer. A graduate of the University of Toronto, she began writing poetry for a number of magazines under the pseudonym M. Morris in the 1950s to the 1960s before going to publish eight books during the 1960s to the 1990s. The League of Canadian Poets established a literary award in Thibaudeau's name and a play set to music based on her words was staged in London, Ontario, in March 2013.

== Early life ==
Thibaudeau was born on December 29, 1925, in Toronto. Ontario. She was the daughter of the high school teacher and writer of Acadian descent John Stewart Thibaudeau and his wife, Alice (née Pryce) Thibaudeau, the Belfast-born war bride. Thibaudeau had one brother and a younger sister. She was raised in St. Thomas, Ontario, and wrote poems during her schooling days that were published in the magazines Here and Now, Northern Review and Undergrad. Thibaudeau completed a Bachelor of Arts degree in English with the option for French at the University of Toronto in 1948, and completed a Master's Thesis in contemporary Canadian poetry to obtain a Master's degree from the same educational institution in 1949. She had been influenced by the poet Margaret Avison during her time at the university.

== Career ==
From 1949 to 1950, she worked in advertising, promotion and publicity at McClelland & Stewart. Thibaudeau went on to work as a teacher of English conservation at Lycee Joachim du Bellay, in Angers, Maine-et-Loire, France between 1950 and 1951. She returned to Toronto in late 1951, where she worked on the 1951 Canadian Census and for the Canadian Post Office during the Christmas period. Around this time, Thibaudeau began writing poetry for a number of magazines such as blewointment, Branching Out, Canadian Forum, Fiddlehead and Niagara Review under the pseudonym M. Morris, which she used between 1951 and 1962 because she believed her name was becoming a familiar one to editors.

Her first book, Lozenges: Poems in the Shapes of Things, was published in 1965. In 1971, she authored Colleen Thibaudeau: Poems and Air Three followed by Ten Letters in 1975. Thibaudeau's collection work, Ten Letters, followed in 1975, with My Granddaughters Are Combing Out Their Long Hair coming in 1977. The literary magazine Brick featured and critically praised her work in its 1979 winter issue. In 1982 and 1983, Thibaudeau's work was featured in the anthologies Twentieth Century Canadian Poetry; The Oxford Book of Canadian Verse and Undozen. This was followed by The Martha Landscapes about change, creativity and time inspired by in 1984, a collection of new and selected poems called The Artemesia Book in 1991 and a set of lyrical poems about a boat called The Patricia in the 1992 book The "Patricia" Album and other Poems. She was a member of the League of Canadian Poets.

== Personal life ==
Thibaudeau was a registered member of the New Democratic Party and of the United Church of Canada. She married the poet and professor James Reaney on December 29, 1951. They had three children, one of whom died from a sudden meningitis attack in 1966. Thibaudeau died at University Hospital in London, Ontario on February 6, 2012, following a series of strokes in the preceding months. On February 11, a funeral service was held for her at the James A. Harris funeral parlour.

== Analysis and legacy ==
According to Colin Boyd in Thibaudeau's entry in The Canadian Encyclopedia, the poet "celebrates the extraordinary nature of ordinary life by combining the everyday with the otherworldly." Marnie Parsons in the book Touch Monkeys: Nonsense Strategies for Reading Twentieth-century Poetry noted Thibaudeau did not write in "standard English" but made "words that are phonetically possible in English by bringing together phonemes utilizing the standard sound conjunctions of the language."

Molly Peacock, the series editor of The Best Canadian Poetry in English, called her the "secret national treasure" of Canada, adding "You could say she was our Carol Shields of poetry, though of course she started before Shields, taking the ideas for her poems from dropped threads of domesticity and exalting them with her casual but timeless lines." In 2012, the Colleen Thibaudeau Outstanding Contribution Award was established by the League of Canadian Poets to recognize a "substantial volunteer project or series of projects that significantly nurture and support poets and poetry across Canada." A play set to music based on Thibaudeau's words called Collenning was held at London, Ontario's Arts Project Theatre in March 2013.
