= George Ian MacLean =

Gold Commissioner George Ian MacLean

Gold Commissioner of Yukon
- In office April 1, 1928 – June 30, 1932
- Prime Minister: William Lyon Mackenzie King
- Preceded by: George Allen Jeckell
- Succeeded by: George Allan Jeckell

George Ian MacLean served as the gold commissioner of Yukon. He remained in office from April 1, 1928 to June 30, 1932. Before assuming office he was the assistant Financial Comptroller of the Department of the Interior in Ottawa. After his term the position of Gold Commissioner and Comptroller were combined in 1932 with the Comptroller being the title for the chief executive. Spelling was changed to Controller in 1936.

== Death ==
He died in Vancouver on December 16, 1939.
