= Deaths in May 2012 =

The following is a list of notable deaths in May 2012.

Entries for each day are listed alphabetically by surname. A typical entry lists information in the following sequence:

- Name, age, country of citizenship and reason for notability, established cause of death, reference (and language of reference, if not English).

== May 2012 ==
=== 1 ===
- Gonçalo Amorim, 39, Portuguese Olympic cyclist.
- Gogó Andreu, 92, Argentine comedian and actor.
- Cali Carranza, 59, American Tejano musician, amyotrophic lateral sclerosis.
- Harold L. Colburn Jr., 86, American physician and politician.
- Gale Dixon, 65–66, American actress and singer, pancreatic cancer.
- Joseph Erhardy, 83, American sculptor.
- Gord Fashoway, 85, Canadian ice hockey player.
- Rufina Gasheva, 90, Soviet Russian flight navigator.
- John Spencer Hardy, 98, American lieutenant general, NATO commander for Southern Europe.
- Harold K. Hoskins, 85, American pilot, Tuskegee Airman, Congressional Gold Medal winner, complications from a fall.
- Greg Jackson, 60, American basketball player (New York Knicks, Phoenix Suns), heart attack.
- Eric James, 87, British Anglican clergyman and broadcaster.
- Senteza Kajubi, 86, Ugandan university administrator and academic.
- James Kinley, 86, Canadian engineer and industrialist, Lieutenant Governor of Nova Scotia (1994–2000).
- Daniel Mulumba, 49, Ugandan Olympic swimmer.
- Viktoras Petkus, 83, Lithuanian political activist and dissident.
- Charles Pitts, 65, American soul musician, guitarist for Isaac Hayes, lung cancer.
- Harriet Presser, 76, American sociologist and demographer.
- Earl Rose, 85, American medical examiner, attempted to autopsy President Kennedy after assassination, Parkinson's disease.
- Shanmugasundari, 75, Indian film actress, heart attack.
- Mordechai Virshubski, 82, Israeli politician, MK (1977–1992) and Deputy Speaker of the Knesset (1988–1992).
- Arnold Manaaki Wilson, 83, New Zealand artist and educator.

=== 2 ===
- Bram Bogart, 90, Dutch-born Belgian painter.
- Michel Boudart, 87, American chemical engineer.
- William Francis Brace, 85, American geophysicist.
- Ranjit Cheema, Canadian gangster and drug trader, shot.
- Razia Matin Chowdhury, 87, Bangladeshi politician, old age complications.
- Peter Connolly, 77, British historian.
- Shirin Darasha, 73, Indian theatre director, pulmonary fibrosis.
- Mark Deutch, 67, Russian journalist, drowned.
- Andrew Ganigan, 59, American former NABF lightweight champion boxer, cancer.
- Nélida Gómez de Navajas, 84, Argentine human rights activist (Grandmothers of the Plaza de Mayo).
- Fernando Lopes, 76, Portuguese film director, throat cancer.
- Zenaida Manfugás, 80, Cuban-born American pianist.
- James Marker, 90, American-born Canadian businessman, inventor of Cheezies.
- Charlotte Mitchell, 85, British actress.
- Tufan Miñnullin, 76, Russian Tatar writer and playwright, heart attack.
- Les Mogg, 82, Australian football player.
- Donald L. Owens, 82, American military officer.
- Ernst Rau, 85, German Olympic fencer.
- J. T. Ready, 39, American border militia leader, former neo-Nazi, suicide by gunshot.
- Tracy Reed, 69, English actress (Dr. Strangelove, Casino Royale), cancer.
- Junior Seau, 43, American football player (San Diego Chargers, Miami Dolphins, New England Patriots), suicide by gunshot.
- Endang Rahayu Sedyaningsih, 57, Indonesian physician, Minister of Health (2009–2012), cancer.
- Akira Tonomura, 70, Japanese physicist, pancreatic cancer.
- Lourdes Valera, 58, Venezuelan actress, lung cancer.
- Digby Wolfe, 82, British actor and screenwriter (Rowan & Martin's Laugh-In), cancer.
- Zvi Zeitlin, 90, Belarusian-born American classical violinist, pneumonia.

=== 3 ===
- Edith Bliss, 52, Australian pop singer and television presenter, lung cancer.
- Lloyd Brevett, 80, Jamaican double bassist (The Skatalites), complications from stroke.
- Elizabeth Busche, 19, American curler, cancer.
- Peter K. Cullins, 83, American admiral, first commander of the Naval Data Automation Command, complications from hepatitis B.
- John Miles Foley, 65, American folklorist and literary scholar.
- Jorge Illueca, 93, Panamanian politician, President (1984), respiratory failure.
- Andrew Suknaski, 69, Canadian poet and visual artist.
- Richie Thomson, 71, New Zealand Olympic cyclist.
- František Tondra, 75, Slovak Roman Catholic prelate, Bishop of Spiš (1989–2011), heart failure.
- Tú Duyên, 96, Vietnamese painter.
- Felix Werder, 90, German-born Australian composer.

=== 4 ===
- Haukur Angantýsson, 63, Icelandic chess player.
- Harriet Berger, 94, American political scientist.
- T. P. Chandrasekharan, 51, Indian politician, assassinated (hacked).
- Aleksandre Chikvaidze, 74, Georgian diplomat.
- Neville Coleman, 74, Australian underwater nature photographer.
- Gert Frischmuth, 79, German choral conductor and music educator.
- Angelica Garnett, 93, British writer and painter.
- Crawford Hallock Greenewalt Jr., 74, American archaeologist.
- Mort Lindsey, 89, American orchestra leader and composer.
- Anthony O'Connell, 73, Irish-born American Roman Catholic prelate, Bishop of Knoxville (1988–1998) and Palm Beach (1998–2002).
- Edward Short, Baron Glenamara, 99, British politician, Deputy Leader of the Labour Party (1972–1976), MP for Newcastle upon Tyne Central (1951–1976).
- Jimmy Smet, 34, Belgian football player (KSK Beveren, Lierse SK, Iraklis Thessaloniki), suicide.
- Bob Stewart, 91, American television game show producer (Password, To Tell the Truth, The Price Is Right), natural causes.
- Adam Yauch, 47, American musician (Beastie Boys) and film director (Gunnin' for That No. 1 Spot), salivary gland cancer.
- Rashidi Yekini, 48, Nigerian footballer.

=== 5 ===
- Ramón Arano, 72, Mexican baseball player.
- Frederick J. Brown, 67, American artist.
- Carl Johan Bernadotte, 95, Swedish royal, youngest son of King Gustaf VI Adolf of Sweden.
- Marguerite S. Chang, 88, Chinese-born American research chemist and inventor.
- Reg Cutler, 77, English footballer.
- Aatos Erkko, 79, Finnish journalist and publisher, after long illness.
- Florida Pearl, 20, Irish racehorse, winner of the Champion Bumper (1997), euthanized.
- George Knobel, 89, Dutch football manager, complications of Alzheimer's disease.
- Don Leshnock, 65, American baseball player (Detroit Tigers).
- Michail Markov, 73, Russian cyclist and coach.
- Meow, app. 2, American cat, heaviest cat at his time of death, lung failure.
- Laine Mesikäpp, 95, Estonian actress, singer and folk song collector.
- Miguel Mora Gornals, 75, Spanish Olympic cyclist.
- Roy Padayachie, 62, South African politician.
- Mendel Sachs, 85, American theoretical physicist.
- Ivica Šangulin, 75, Croatian football player and manager.
- Surendranath, 75, Indian cricketer.
- Ali Uras, 88, Turkish Olympic basketball player and president of Galatasaray S.K. (1979–1986).

=== 6 ===
- Lubna Agha, 63, Pakistani-American artist, cancer.
- Fahd al-Quso, 37, Yemeni militant, al-Qaeda member, airstrike.
- Vagn Andersen, 74, Danish sports shooter.
- Stevan Bena, 76, Serbian footballer.
- Tyrone Breuninger, 73, American trombonist.
- James R. Browning, 93, American senior (former chief) judge of the Court of Appeals for the Ninth Circuit.
- Michael Burks, 54, American blues musician, heart attack.
- François Chevalier, 98, French historian.
- Ekalavyan, 77, Indian writer.
- Pat Frink, 67, American basketball player (Cincinnati Royals), automobile accident.
- Jerry H. Geisler, 77, American lawyer and politician.
- Iraj Ghaderi, 77, Iranian film director and actor.
- Kåre Øistein Hansen, 84, Norwegian politician.
- James Isaac, 51, American film director, producer (Jason X, Skinwalkers) and special effects supervisor, multiple myeloma and blood cancer.
- Kostas Karras, 76, Greek actor, MP (2000–2007), prostate cancer.
- Félix Kouadjo, 73, Ivorian Roman Catholic prelate, Bishop of Bondoukou (since 1996).
- Jean Laplanche, 87, French psychoanalyst, pulmonary fibrosis,
- George Lindsey, 83, American actor (The Andy Griffith Show, Mayberry R.F.D., Hee Haw), after brief illness.
- Georgi Lozanov, 85, Bulgarian educator, developed Suggestopedia.
- Marika Mitsotakis, 82, Greek politician, wife of the Greek Prime Minister Konstantinos Mitsotakis (1990–1993), complications of poliomyelitis.
- John Slack, 81, English cricketer and judge.
- Yale Summers, 78, American actor (Daktari).
- Tran Dinh Truong, 80, Vietnamese businessman.
- Jan Trøjborg, 56, Danish politician, member of the Folketing (1987–2005), and Defence Minister (2000–2001), heart failure.
- John Worrall, 84, New Zealand cricketer.

=== 7 ===
- Ivan Allen, 81, American ballet dancer (Metropolitan Opera).
- Ferenc Bartha, 68, Hungarian economist, Governor of the National Bank of Hungary (1988–1990), suicide.
- Sammy Barr, 80, Scottish trade union leader.
- Norbert Becker, 74, German agricultural scientist.
- Jules Bocandé, 53, Senegalese footballer, complications of surgery and stroke.
- Rich Buhler, 65, American radio personality, pancreatic cancer.
- R. Michael Canjar, 58, American mathematician.
- Robert Everett Coyle, 82, American senior (former chief) judge of the District Court for the Eastern District of California.
- Andrea Crisanti, 75, Italian production designer and art director.
- Virgil Frye, 81, American actor and boxer, Pick's Disease.
- Kimitada Hayase, 71, Japanese track and field athlete (1960 Summer Olympics, 1964 Summer Olympics), blood poisoning.
- Alexander Keynan, 90, Israeli microbiologist, co-founder and the first director of Israel Institute for Biological Research.
- Sergio Mihanovich, 74, Argentine jazz pianist, singer and composer, cancer.
- Eva Rausing, 48, American philanthropist.
- Gene Visich, 85, American AAGPBL baseball player.

=== 8 ===
- Ampon Tangnoppakul, 64, Thai detainee, cancer.
- Bobby Bulch, 79, English footballer.
- William Aquin Carew, 89, Canadian Roman Catholic prelate, Apostolic Nuncio to Japan (1983–1997).
- Oscar M. Corbin Jr., 94, American politician.
- Yves Courrière, 76, French writer, biographer and journalist.
- Aimée Danis, 82, Canadian film director and producer.
- Isabel Gago, 98, Portuguese engineer.
- Nan Giese, 90, Australian educator and artist.
- Nicholas Katzenbach, 90, American lawyer, United States Attorney General (1965–1966).
- Lau Teng Chuan, 83, Singaporean sports administrator, stomach cancer.
- Everett Lilly, 87, American bluegrass musician (The Lilly Brothers).
- Carlos Loiseau, 63, Argentine cartoonist, colorectal cancer.
- Sergio Marqués Fernández, 65, Spanish politician, President of the Principality of Asturias (1995–1999).
- Bob Marshall, 77, American politician. Mayor of San Bruno, California (1980–1991).
- Jerry McMorris, 71, American baseball executive (Colorado Rockies), pancreatic cancer.
- Frank Parr, 83, English cricketer and jazz musician.
- Louis H. Pollak, 89, American senior judge of the District Court for the Eastern District of Pennsylvania.
- Ingvill Raaum, 76, Norwegian politician.
- George Stephen Ritchie, 97, British war hero and hydrographer.
- Stacy Robinson, 50, American football player (New York Giants), cancer.
- Robert de La Rochefoucauld, 88, French Resistance member.
- Maurice Sendak, 83, American author and illustrator (Where the Wild Things Are, Little Bear), complications of a stroke.
- Roman Totenberg, 101, Polish-born American violinist, renal failure.
- Vo Rogue, 28, Australian Thoroughbred racehorse, winner of the Australian Cup (1989, 1990).
- Garth Webb, 93, Canadian soldier and museum founder (Juno Beach Centre).

=== 9 ===
- Carl Beane, 59, American sports broadcaster and public address announcer (Fenway Park), heart attack.
- Christoph Bulwin, 40, German man, complications related to mercury poisoning.
- James Carter, 100, American basketball coach (University of Dayton).
- Chinghla Mong Chowdhury Mari, 73, Bangladeshi footballer, Alzheimer's disease.
- Bertram Cohler, 73, American psychologist.
- Danilo De Girolamo, 56, Italian voice actor, heart attack.
- Alfred Doll-Steinberg, 78, Austrian-born British chemical engineer.
- Gunnar Dybwad, 83, Norwegian footballer.
- Alain Fossoul, 83, Belgian footballer,
- Hernán Haddad, 83, Chilean Olympic athlete.
- Sir Geoffrey Henry, 71, Cook Islands politician, Prime Minister (1983, 1989–1999), and Speaker of Parliament (since 2011), cancer.
- Northerly, 15, Australian racehorse, winner of the Australian Cup (2001, 2003) and Cox Plate (2001, 2002), euthanized.
- Constantin Piron, 80, Belgian physicist.
- Joyce Redman, 96, Irish-born British actress (Othello, Tom Jones), pneumonia.
- Vidal Sassoon, 84, British hairstylist, leukemia.
- Ingvald M. Smith-Kielland, 92, Norwegian royal servant.
- Lajos Somodi Sr., 83, Hungarian Olympic bronze medallist fencer (1956).

=== 10 ===
- Edward Abramson, 91, American politician.
- George Birimisa, 88, American playwright, actor, and director.
- Ningali Cullen, 69–70, Australian activist.
- Barbara D'Arcy, 84, American visual merchandiser.
- Peter David, 60, British journalist, (The Economist) traffic collision.
- Horst Faas, 79, German photojournalist (Associated Press).
- Ranjitsinh Pratapsinh Gaekwad, 74, Indian politician, member of the Lok Sabha (1980–1989), Maharaja of Baroda (since 1988).
- Evelyn Bryan Johnson, 102, American aviator.
- Günther Kaufmann, 64, German film actor, heart attack.
- Pekka Marjamäki, 64, Finnish Olympic ice hockey player, heart attack.
- Eddie Perkins, 75, American former world light welterweight champion boxer.
- Bernardo Sassetti, 41, Portuguese jazz pianist and film composer, fall.
- Carroll Shelby, 89, American automobile racer and designer.
- Andreas Shipanga, 80, Namibian politician, Chairman of the Transitional Government of National Unity (1987, 1988), heart attack.
- Gunnar Sønsteby, 94, Norwegian resistance movement member.
- Walter Wink, 76, American theologian, complications of dementia.
- Paul Winslow, 74, American football player and NFL defensive back (Green Bay Packers)
- Gulumbu Yunupingu, 69, Australian Aboriginal artist.

=== 11 ===
- Soungalo Bagayogo, 70, Malian Olympic boxer.
- Alma Bella, 102, Filipino actress.
- Jack Benaroya, 90, American real estate developer.
- Sherman A. Bernard, 86, American businessman.
- Patrick Bosch, 47, Dutch footballer (FC Twente), car accident.
- Stanislav Brebera, 86, Czech chemist.
- Les Carr, 82, Australian football player.
- Sheila Conroy, 94, Irish trade union leader and activist.
- Dankwart Danckwerts, 79, German sociologist.
- Tony DeZuniga, 79, Filipino comic book artist and co-creator of Jonah Hex and Black Orchid, complications from stroke.
- Alfred Diamant, 94, Austrian-born American political scientist.
- Leela Roy Ghosh, 64, Indian actress and voice-dubbing artist, complications of liver transplant surgery.
- Rose Mary Glaser, 90, American AAGPBL baseball player.
- Thea Hochleitner, 86, Austrian Olympic bronze medal-winning (1956) alpine skier.
- Grant Jeffrey, 63, Canadian Bible teacher and writer.
- Rodolfo Kappenberger, 95, Swiss footballer.
- Sir Michael Kerry, 88, British public servant, Treasury Solicitor (1980–1984).
- Annemarie Roeper, 93, Austrian-born American educator, co-founder of the Roeper School, pneumonia.
- László Seregi, 82, Hungarian dancer and choreographer.
- Roland Shaw, 91, British bandleader and music arranger.
- Martin Stovold, 56, English cricketer.
- Travis H. Tomlinson, 98, American politician, Mayor of Raleigh, North Carolina (1965–1969).
- Frank Wills, 53, American baseball player (Toronto Blue Jays, Kansas City Royals, Cleveland Indians).

=== 12 ===
- Jan Bens, 91, Dutch footballer (Feyenoord).
- Frank Bethwaite, 91, New Zealand boat designer, author and meteorologist.
- Ferrin Campbell, 88, American politician.
- J. William Costerton, 77, Canadian microbiologist.
- Paul Cyr, 48, Canadian hockey player (Buffalo Sabres, New York Rangers, Hartford Whalers), heart failure.
- Paul Dee, 65, American lawyer and athletic director (University of Miami).
- Ernst Josef Fittkau, 84, German entomologist.
- Ruth Foster, 92, American actress (Little House on the Prairie).
- Richard Gerrard-Wright, 82, British Army officer.
- Terry Martin, 74, American surfboard shaper.
- Neil McKenty, 87, Canadian radio talk-show host and author.
- Donald Nicholson, 96, British biochemist.
- Eddy Paape, 91, Belgian comics artist (Luc Orient).
- Harold Arthur Poling, 86, American businessman, CEO and Chairman of Ford Motor Company (1990–1993).
- Sam Porcello, 76, American food scientist, created the Oreo cookie filling.
- Ken Selby, 76, American businessman, founder of Mazzio's, complications from lung cancer.
- Fritz Ursell, 89, German-born British mathematician (Ursell number).

=== 13 ===
- Trond Bråthen, 34, Norwegian singer and guitarist (Urgehal), natural causes.
- William G. Braud, 69, American psychologist and parapsychologist.
- Marek Cichosz, 32, Polish cyclist.
- Arsala Rahmani Daulat, Afghan politician, Afghan High Peace Council member, shot.
- Donald "Duck" Dunn, 70, American bass guitarist (The Blues Brothers, Booker T. & the M.G.'s).
- Paul Engstad, 85, Norwegian writer and politician.
- Ada Maria Isasi-Diaz, 69, American theologian, cancer.
- Les Leston, 91, British racing driver.
- Andy Mate, 72, American soccer player.
- Jean McFarlane, Baroness McFarlane of Llandaff, 86, British nurse and peer.
- Nguyễn Văn Thiện, 106, Vietnamese Roman Catholic prelate, Bishop of Vĩnh Long (1960–1968).
- Lee Richardson, 33, British speedway rider, race crash.
- Nolan Richardson III, 47, American college basketball coach (Tennessee State University).
- Don Ritchie, 85, Australian volunteer, rescued 160 people from suicide.
- Jack Simcock, 82, British artist.
- Bill Walsh, 84, American football player (Pittsburgh Steelers).
- Trevor Young, 86, New Zealand politician, MP for Hutt (1968–1978); Eastern Hutt (1978–1990).

=== 14 ===
- Vladimer Aptsiauri, 50, Georgian Olympic gold medal-winning (1988) fencer.
- Burgess Carr, 76, Liberian-born American priest, religious leader, and professor, Lewy bodies disease.
- Joséphine Catapano, 93, American perfumer.
- Horia Damian, 90, Romanian painter and sculptor.
- Tor Marius Gromstad, 22, Norwegian footballer (Stabæk), fall. (body discovered on this date)
- Mitchell Guist, 48, American reality series cast member (Swamp People), natural causes.
- Derek Hammond-Stroud, 86, English opera singer.
- Ernst Hinterberger, 80, Austrian author and screenwriter (Kaisermühlen Blues, Ein echter Wiener geht nicht unter).
- Taruni Sachdev, 14, Indian film actress (Vellinakshatram, Sathyam, Paa, Vetri Selvan), plane crash.
- Mario Trejo, 86, Argentine poet.
- Belita Woods, 63, American funk singer (Brainstorm, Parliament-Funkadelic), heart failure.

=== 15 ===
- Donald S. Bryan, 90, American Air Force pilot and flying ace.
- Henry Denker, 99, American novelist and playwright, lung cancer.
- Carlos Fuentes, 83, Panamanian-born Mexican novelist, internal hemorrhage.
- Jean Craighead George, 92, American children's author (Julie of the Wolves, My Side of the Mountain), heart failure.
- Peter Koslowski, 59, German philosopher and academic.
- Arno Lustiger, 88, Upper Silesian-born German writer and Judaic historian.
- Zakaria Mohieddin, 93, Egyptian politician and military officer, Vice President (1961–1964, 1965–1968), Prime Minister (1965–1966).
- John Murray, 11th Duke of Atholl, 83, South African-born hereditary peer of the Peerage of Scotland.
- Dominique Rolin, 99, Belgian author.
- Sir Roy Shaw, 93, British arts administrator.
- Frederick E. Smith, 93, British author (633 Squadron), heart attack.
- Ángel Alfredo Villatoro, 47, Honduran journalist and radio personality, killed.
- Horst Walter, 75, German artist.
- George Wyllie, 90, Scottish sculptor.

=== 16 ===
- Patricia Aakhus, 59, American novelist, cancer.
- James Abdnor, 89, American politician, U.S. Representative (1973–1981) and U.S. Senator (1981–1987) from South Dakota.
- Dwight Bentel, 103, American journalist and professor.
- Jože Bertoncelj, 90, Slovenian alpine skier.
- Maria Bieșu, 76, Moldovan opera singer, leukemia.
- Barry Blaikie, 77, Australian politician.
- Chuck Brown, 75, American singer and musician ("Bustin' Loose"), multiple organ failure.
- Warren Bruno, 63, American restaurateur.
- Ernie Chan, 71, Filipino-born American comic book artist (Batman, Doctor Strange, Conan the Barbarian).
- Pat Dickie, 93, Australian politician, member of the Victorian Legislative Council for Ballarat (1956–1978).
- Doug Dillard, 75, American bluegrass musician (The Dillards) and actor (The Andy Griffith Show), lung infection.
- Kurt Felix, 71, Swiss television presenter, thymoma.
- Hans Geister, 83, German Olympic bronze medallist relay runner (1952).
- Hugo Gottfrit, 61, Argentine football player.
- Kevin Hickey, 56, American baseball player (Chicago White Sox, Baltimore Orioles), complications of a seizure.
- Andrei Mylnikov, 93, Russian painter.
- Thad Tillotson, 71, American baseball player (New York Yankees, Nakai Hawks).
- Anne Warner, 71, British biologist, cerebral haemorrhage.

=== 17 ===
- Warda Al-Jazairia, 72, Algerian singer, cardiac arrest.
- Marion C. Bascom, 87, American civil rights leader, heart attack.
- Herbert Breslin, 87, American music industry executive, heart attack.
- Bobby Cain, 81, American racing driver.
- France Clidat, 79, French classical pianist.
- Betty Cordon, 88, American socialite.
- James Doss, 73, American writer.
- Gideon Ezra, 74, Israeli politician, MK (since 1996), lung cancer.
- Patrick Mafisango, 32, Congolese-born Rwandan footballer, car accident.
- Stepan Pogosyan, 80, Armenian historian and politician.
- Derek Round, 77, New Zealand journalist, injuries following assault. (body discovered on this date)
- Ron Shock, 69, American stand-up comedian, urethral cancer.
- Donna Summer, 63, American singer ("Bad Girls", "Hot Stuff", "Last Dance", "I Feel Love"), lung cancer.
- Harald Synnes, 81, Norwegian politician.
- Marcy Tigner, 90, American Christian children's entertainer.
- Sir Moti Tikaram, 87, Fijian judge and ombudsman.

=== 18 ===
- Arthur Bertram Court, 84, Australian botanist.
- Dick Everitt, 90, English footballer.
- Dietrich Fischer-Dieskau, 86, German baritone and conductor.
- Tom Fuentes, 63, American political leader, Orange County Republican Party chairman (1985–2004), liver cancer.
- Marco Antonio Ávila García, 39, Mexican crime reporter, strangulation.
- Peter Jones, 49, British drummer (Crowded House), brain cancer.
- Justo Justo, 70, Filipino columnist and politician.
- Eugene Lacritz, 82, American conductor.
- Hans-Dieter Lange, 85, German TV journalist.
- Alan Oakley, 85, British designer of Raleigh Chopper bicycle, cancer.
- Paul O'Sullivan, 48, Canadian comedian and actor (It Takes Two, George Shrinks, Grossology), traffic collision.
- Gavin Packard, 48, British-born Indian Bollywood film actor, respiratory disease.
- A. Teeuw, 90, Dutch critic of Indonesian literature.

=== 19 ===
- Willard Bond, 85, American painter.
- Bob Boozer, 75, American Olympic gold medal-winning (1960) basketball player (New York Knicks, Chicago Bulls), brain aneurysm.
- Rudolf Braun, 82, Swiss historian.
- Tamara Brooks, 70, American choral conductor, heart attack.
- Ian Burgess, 81, British racing driver.
- Muriel Cerf, 61, French writer, cancer.
- Jacques Clancy, 92, French actor.
- Isak Doera, 80, Philippines-born Indonesian Roman Catholic prelate, Bishop of Sintang (1976–1996).
- John Guest, 73, British geologist.
- Ranjit Kumar Gupta, 93, Indian police chief.
- Gerhard Hetz, 69, German Olympic silver and bronze medal-winning (1964) swimmer.
- Phil Lamason, 93, New Zealand Air Force officer.
- Ann Rosener, 97, American photojournalist.

=== 20 ===
- Safiuddin Ahmed, 89, Bangladeshi painter and printmaker.
- Abdelbaset al-Megrahi, 60, Libyan terrorist, convicted of bombing Pan Am Flight 103, prostate cancer.
- Jacqueline Ayer, 82, American author, illustrator, fashion and textile designer.
- Bob Bethell, 69, American politician, Kansas State Representative (since 1999), car accident.
- Alan Britton, 89, New Zealand cricketer.
- Louis F. Burns, 92, American tribal and Osage Nation historian.
- Leela Dube, 89, Indian anthropologist.
- Geoffrey Evans, 69, Irish serial killer.
- John George, 81, Scottish officer of arms.
- Robin Gibb, 62, British singer and songwriter (Bee Gees), liver and kidney failure.
- Ernestine Glossbrenner, 79, American educator and politician.
- Nils Jernsletten, 77, Norwegian linguist.
- David Littman, 78, British historian and human rights activist.
- Bholabhai Patel, 77, Indian Gujarati author.
- Eugene Polley, 96, American engineer, inventor of the wireless TV remote control.
- Howie Richmond, 94, American music publisher and executive.
- David Ridgway, 74, British archaeologist.
- Raul Rojas, 70, American former WBA featherweight champion boxer.
- Carrie Smith, 86, American blues and jazz singer.
- Andrew B. Steinberg, 53, American lawyer.
- Marc Strange, 70, Canadian television writer (The Beachcombers) and actor (X-Men: The Animated Series, ReGenesis), cancer.
- Svenn Stray, 90, Norwegian politician, Minister of Foreign Affairs (1970–1971, 1981–1986).
- Sultana Zaman, 76, Bangladeshi actress.

=== 21 ===
- Kateryna Adamenko, 93, Ukrainian athlete and coach, atherosclerosis.
- Bahram Alivandi, 83–84, Iranian-born Austrian artist.
- Andreas Arntzen, 83, Norwegian barrister.
- C.C. Banana, 43, American comedian, suicide.
- Kevin Barry, 62, New Zealand rugby league player.
- Eddie Blazonczyk, 70, American polka musician, natural causes.
- Otis Clark, 109, American evangelist, oldest known survivor of the 1921 Tulsa race massacre, and butler (Clark Gable, Joan Crawford), natural causes.
- Constantine of Irinoupolis, 75, American Orthodox hierarch, Primate of the Ukrainian Orthodox Church of the USA (since 1993).
- Heiko Daxl, 54, German media artist.
- Roman Dumbadze, 48, Georgian rebel commander, shot.
- Giovinella Gonthier, 63, Seychellian teacher, concierge, diplomat, author, and consultant.
- Heinrich Holland, 84, German-born American scientist.
- Ezell Lee, 74, American politician, Mississippi State Representative (1988–1992) and State Senator (1992–2012), cancer.
- Master Oats, 26, British Thoroughbred racehorse, winner of the Cheltenham Gold Cup (1995), myocardial infarction.
- Juan Manuel Montero Vázquez, 64, Spanish military surgeon.
- Douglas Rodríguez, 61, Cuban boxer, heart attack.
- Bill Stewart, 59, American football coach (West Virginia University), apparent heart attack.
- Alan Thorne, 73, Australian anthropologist, developer of the theory of multiregional origin of modern humans, Alzheimer's disease.
- Rodolfo Félix Valdés, 86, Mexican politician, Governor of Sonora (1985–1991).

=== 22 ===
- Muzaffar Ahmed, 79, Bangladeshi economist, natural causes.
- Muzafar Bhutto, 41, Pakistani Sindhi nationalist politician.
- Juanita Boisseau, 100, American dancer.
- Wesley A. Brown, 85, American naval officer, first African-American graduate of the U.S. Naval Academy, cancer.
- Michael Bryson, 69, American reporter.
- Janet Carroll, 71, American singer and actress (Risky Business, Married... with Children, Murphy Brown), brain cancer.
- Daehaeng, 85, Korean Buddhist nun.
- Chico Formiga, 81, Brazilian footballer and manager, heart attack.
- Shiu-Ying Hu, 102, Chinese botanist.
- Henrik Kalocsai, 71, Hungarian Olympic track and field athlete.
- Flinder Anderson Khonglam, 67, Indian politician and physician, Chief Minister of Meghalaya (2001–2003).
- Albion W. Knight Jr., 87, American army officer, bishop and politician.
- Dave Mann, 79, American football player (Chicago Cardinals, Toronto Argonauts), complications from dementia.
- Hazel Monteith, 94, Jamaican consumer rights advocate.
- John Moores Jr., 83, English businessman, Chancellor of Liverpool John Moores University (1994–1999).
- Elaine Mulqueen, 80, American children's television host and personality.
- Edmund Potrzebowski, 85, Polish Olympic athlete.
- Janet Lees Price, 69, British actress (Blake's 7, Z-Cars).
- Mike Voight, 58, American football player.
- Sir Derek Wanless, 64, British banker and public policy adviser, pancreatic cancer.
- Jesse Whittenton, 78, American football player (Green Bay Packers, Los Angeles Rams).
- Hidekazu Yoshida, 98, Japanese music critic and literary critic.

=== 23 ===
- T. Garry Buckley, 89, American politician, Vermont State Senator (1955–1965), Lieutenant Governor (1977–1979).
- Aub Carrigan, 94, Australian cricketer.
- Gyula Elek, 80, Hungarian handball player and coach.
- Sattareh Farmanfarmaian, 91, Iranian writer and princess.
- Paul Fussell, 88, American literary scholar and social critic, natural causes.
- Millie Goldsholl, 92, American film director and producer.
- Hal Jackson, 96, American disc jockey and radio personality.
- Leonel Mitchell, 81, American liturgical scholar.
- William C. Wampler, 86, American politician, U.S. Representative for Virginia (1953–1955, 1967–1983).

=== 24 ===
- Ursula Arnold, 83, German photographer.
- George Ceithaml, 91, American football player.
- Klaas Carel Faber, 90, Dutch-born Nazi war criminal, kidney failure.
- Kathi Kamen Goldmark, 63, American writer, cancer.
- James Arnot Hamilton, 89, British aircraft designer.
- Jacqueline Harpman, 82, Belgian writer.
- Hermengild Li Yi, 88, Chinese Roman Catholic prelate, Bishop of Lu'an (since 1998).
- Juan Francisco Lombardo, 86, Argentine football player.
- Toby Maduot, 78, Sudanese politician.
- Mark McConnell, 50, American drummer (Sebastian Bach, Blackfoot), multiple organ failure.
- Ndombe Opetum, 68, Congolese musician.
- William Rathje, 66, American archaeologist.
- Lee Rich, 93, American television executive and producer (The Waltons, Dallas), co-founder of Lorimar Television, lung cancer.

=== 25 ===
- R. Dilip, 56, Indian actor, heart attack.
- Robert Fossier, 84, French historian.
- Keith Gardner, 82, Jamaican Olympic bronze medal-winning (1960) athlete, complications of surgery and stroke.
- Alistair Hamilton, 77, Scottish lawyer, scout leader and banker.
- William Hanley, 80, American screenwriter and playwright.
- Edoardo Mangiarotti, 93, Italian Olympic gold medal-winning (1936, 1952, 1956, 1960) fencer.
- Peter D. Sieruta, 63, American writer and critic, complications due to a fall.
- Beatrice Sparks, 95, American therapist and writer.
- Doug Walton, 65–66, English rugby league player.
- Lou Watson, 88, American basketball player and coach (Indiana University).

=== 26 ===
- Zvi Aharoni, 91, German-born Israeli Mossad agent.
- Orhan Boran, 84, Turkish television host, bone marrow cancer.
- Arthur Decabooter, 75, Belgian professional racing cyclist, heart attack.
- Leo Dillon, 79, American comic book illustrator (Why Mosquitoes Buzz in People's Ears), complications from lung surgery.
- Anna-Lisa Eriksson, 83, Swedish Olympic bronze medal-winning (1956) cross-country skier.
- Omar Muhammad Farah, 36–37, Somali teacher and politician, road accident.
- Stephen Healey, 29, British Army officer and footballer (Swansea City), improvised explosive device.
- Hiroshi Miyazawa, 90, Japanese politician, Minister of Justice (1995), Governor of Hiroshima Prefecture (1973–1981), natural causes.
- Jean Morton, 91, British television presenter.
- Hans Schmidt, 87, Canadian professional wrestler.
- Jim Unger, 75, English-born Canadian cartoonist (Herman).
- Roy Wilson, 72, Jamaican singer (Higgs and Wilson).

=== 27 ===
- José María Busto, 88, Spanish footballer.
- Dee Caruso, 83, American television writer (Get Smart, The Monkees), pneumonia.
- Simeon Daniel, 77, Kittitian politician, first Premier of Nevis (1983–1992).
- Octiabr' Emelianenko, 85, Soviet Russian physicist.
- Friedrich Hirzebruch, 84, German mathematician.
- Zita Kabátová, 99, Czech actress.
- Richard Wall Lyman, 88, American educator and historian, President of Stanford University (1970–1980), heart failure.
- William Lee Miller, 86, American historian.
- David Rimoin, 75, American geneticist, pancreatic cancer.
- Earl Shorris, 75, American writer and social critic.
- Johnny Tapia, 45, American former triple world champion boxer.
- Jan de Vries, 88, Canadian army veteran.

=== 28 ===
- Pierre Allès, 95, Algerian racing cyclist.
- Don Anthony, 83, British Olympic hammer thrower.
- Gregorio Baro, 83, Argentine chemist.
- Ed Burton, 72, American basketball player.
- Andy Cameron, 52-53, British interactive artist and writer, heart attack.
- Hugh Dawnay, 79, English soldier and polo player.
- Rheta DeVries, 75, American psychologist.
- Bob Edwards, 86, British journalist.
- Richard Killen, 82, Australian politician, member of the New South Wales Legislative Council (1981–1991).
- Judith Nelson, 72, American opera singer.
- Harry Parker, 64, American baseball player (St. Louis Cardinals, New York Mets, Cleveland Indians).
- Ludovic Quistin, 28, Guadeloupean footballer (Tamworth), traffic accident.
- Yuri Susloparov, 53, Ukrainian-born Russian football player and coach.
- Emmanuel David Tannenbaum, 33, Israeli scientist.
- Matthew Yuricich, 89, American special effects artist (Field of Dreams, Close Encounters of the Third Kind, Blade Runner).

=== 29 ===
- Toni Arden, 88, American singer.
- André Bernier, 81, Canadian politician and accountant.
- Dick Beals, 85, American voice actor (Davey and Goliath, Speedy Alka-Seltzer).
- Vince Cardell, 73, American pianist.
- Maureen Dunlop de Popp, 91, Argentinian-born British aviator.
- Elizabeth Ewen, American historian.
- John Fredriksson, 88, Swedish alpine skier.
- Nasir Gadžihanov, 45, Macedonian Olympic wrestler.
- Frederick Gehring, 64, American mathematician.
- Cassandra Jardine, 57, British journalist, cancer.
- Mark Minkov, 67, Russian composer.
- Mohamed Taieb Naciri, 73, Moroccan lawyer and politician.
- Jim Paratore, 58, American television producer (TMZ, The Ellen DeGeneres Show, The Rosie O'Donnell Show), heart attack.
- Ivor Porter, 98, British diplomat.
- Ola O. Røssum, 86, Norwegian politician.
- Kaneto Shindo, 100, Japanese film director, natural causes.
- Doc Watson, 89, American folk and bluegrass musician, complications following surgery.

=== 30 ===
- Zahir Alam, 42, Indian cricketer, liver ailment.
- Barton Lidice Beneš, 69, American artist.
- Jerry Blemker, 67, American baseball coach.
- Duane Bryers, 100, American painter, illustrator, and sculptor.
- Pierre Ceyrac, 98, French Jesuit missionary.
- Tomas Fernandez Concepcion, 78, Filipino politician.
- Aldo Conterno, 81, Italian winemaker.
- Pete Cosey, 68, American guitarist.
- Edi Federer, 57, Austrian ski jumper, amyotrophic lateral sclerosis.
- John Fox, 59, American comedian, colon cancer.
- Buddy Freitag, 80, American Broadway theatre producer (Dirty Rotten Scoundrels, Catch Me If You Can), brain tumor.
- Sir Andrew Huxley, 94, British physiologist, biophysicist, and Nobel laureate (Physiology or Medicine, 1963).
- Albertus Klijn, 89, Dutch religious scholar.
- Charles Lemmond, 84, American politician, Pennsylvania State Senator (1985–2006).
- Farideh Mashini, Iranian feminist activist.
- Hamza Ben Driss Ottmani, 72, Moroccan economist and writer.
- Mr. Imagination, 64, American outsider artist, blood infection.
- Gerhard Pohl, 74, German politician, drowning.
- Rekin Teksoy, 84, Turkish lawyer, author and translator.
- Jack Twyman, 78, American Hall of Fame basketball player (Rochester/Cincinnati Royals), blood cancer.

=== 31 ===
- Natasha Borovsky, 87, Russian American poet and novelist.
- Christopher Challis, 93, British cinematographer (Chitty Chitty Bang Bang, Top Secret!, Mary, Queen of Scots).
- John H. Ewing, 93, American politician.
- Desmond Fernando, 81, Sri Lankan doctor and inventor.
- Roger Fournier, 82, Canadian writer and television director.
- Farid Habib, 77, Lebanese politician, MP for El Koura (since 2005), illness.
- Nélson Jacobina, 58, Brazilian songwriter ("Maracatu Atômico"), lung cancer.
- Randall B. Kester, 95, American attorney and judge.
- Mark Midler, 80, Russian Olympic gold medal-winning (1960, 1964) foil fencer.
- Paul Pietsch, 100, German Formula One and Grand Prix race car driver, first to reach the age of 100, pneumonia.
- Paul Sussman, 45, British journalist (CNN), archaeologist, and author, ruptured aneurysm.
- Gareth Walters, 83, Welsh musician.
- Orlando Woolridge, 52, American basketball player (Chicago Bulls) and coach (Los Angeles Sparks), heart disease.
- Zhou Ruchang, 94, Chinese academic and redologist.
