= SuperCamp =

International educational summer camp

SUPERCAMP is an international educational summer camp program founded in 1982 which introduces students to accelerated learning academic skills and life skills. The program is held in several different locations around the world.

SuperCamp is run by the Quantum Learning Network (QLN), a California-based educational organization. The SuperCamp program aims to teach students skills which will make studying any subject a faster, easier, more enjoyable and less stressful process. The camp's life skills curriculum focuses on developing communication skills, building stronger personal relationships with family and friends, developing teamwork and leadership ability, boosting creativity and problem-solving ability, and setting clear goals. The camp uses metaphors such as an outdoor ropes course and board-breaking to help students develop strategies for overcoming barriers to success.

== History ==
The President of the QLN, Bobbi DePorter, first studied accelerated learning methods with Dr. Georgi Lozanov in the 1970s. These methods became the basis of the SuperCamp program which DePorter co-founded in the early 1980s with Eric Jensen and Greg Simmons and further developed with husband/partner, Joe Chapon. The first SuperCamp was held in 1982 at Kirkwood Meadows, California.

The program has since grown rapidly. Presently, camps are held every summer at several college campuses throughout the United States, including Stanford University, UCLA, Loyola Marymount University, UC Berkeley, Wake Forest University, Loyola University Chicago, Kent State University, University of South Florida, and Brown University.

SuperCamp was first held outside the United States in 1990, when camps were conducted in Moscow and Singapore. The program is now held every year in various countries in Asia, Europe, Central America, Australia, and North America. In 2019, SuperCamp hosted a program at Stanford University for 22 Bermudian students.

== Curriculum ==
SuperCamp programs teaches academic skills such as Quantum Strategies, test-taking, time-management and organizational skills, Quantum Reading, a speed reading course, Quantum Writing, which designs methods of overcoming writer's block, note-taking, memory improvement, SAT / ACT preparatory courses and life skills such as the "8 Keys of Excellence"

== Program levels ==
The following SuperCamp programs are conducted the United States:

- Junior Forum – 7-day camp, ages 11–13
- Senior Forum – 10-day camp, ages 14–18
- Leadership Team – 10-day camp at Senior Forum for past Senior Forum graduates only, ages 15–18
- Leadership Forum – 7-day camp, ages 16–19 (for past Leadership Team graduates only)
- Quantum U – 8-day camp, ages 18–21

Variations on this structure exist outside the United States in order to make the program relevant and appropriate for students in the local school system in each country where the camp is held. A "Youth Forum" program for ages 8–10 used to be run in the US and continues to be held overseas.
