= Everitt (surname) =

Everitt is a surname. Notable people with the surname include:

- Allen Edward Everitt (1824–1882) English architectural artist
- Andrejs Everitt (born 1989) Australian rules footballer
- Anthony Everitt (born 1940) British academic
- Arthur Everitt (1872–1952) British fencer
- Barney Everitt, of the E-M-F Company
- Barry Everitt (rugby union) (born 1976), former rugby union footballer
- Barry Everitt (scientist) (born 1946), British neuroscientist
- Bill Everitt (baseball) (1868–1938), Major League Baseball player
- Bill Everitt (racing driver) (1901–1993), MG race car driver
- Dick Everitt (1922–2012), English footballer
- Francis Everitt (born 1934), English physicist
- Keith Everitt (1923–2015), politician
- Leon Everitt (1947–2016) former Major League Baseball pitcher
- Matt Everitt (born 1972) English radio presenter and drummer
- Michael Everitt (born 1968) Archdeacon of Lancaster, England
- Mike Everitt (baseball) (born 1964), American baseball umpire
- Mike Everitt (footballer) (born 1941), association football player and coach
- Peter Everitt (born 1974), Australian footballer
- Rawinia Everitt (born 1986), New Zealand rugby player
- Richard Everitt (1979-1994), victim of a racially motivated murder in London
- Russell Everitt (1881–1973) English cricketer
- Steve Everitt (born 1970) American former professional offensive lineman
- William Littell Everitt (1900–1986), American electrical engineer and educator

== See also ==
- Everett (disambiguation)
- Richard Everitt (disambiguation)
