= Bobbi DePorter =

American educator

Roberta "Bobbi" DePorter is the President of the Quantum Learning Network (QLN) and co-founder of the SuperCamp program.

In the late 1970s, DePorter was a co-founder of the Burklyn Business School in Vermont – an avant-garde school that taught traditional business subjects in a non-traditional manner. DePorter studied with Dr. Georgi Lozanov, who developed accelerated learning, and applied his methods at the school.

In 1982, DePorter teamed-up with Eric Jensen and Greg Simmons to co-found SuperCamp – a summer camp program designed to introduce teenagers to accelerated learning academic skills and valuable life skills. The SuperCamp program is now run by QLN and is held annually at several locations across the United States and around the world. Since 1982, more than 50,000 students worldwide have attended SuperCamp.

DePorter is a past President of the International Alliance for Learning, and a past Chairman of the San Diego Chamber of Commerce's Business Roundtable for Best Educational Practices.
