= Cullins =

Cullins is a surname. Notable people with the surname include:

- Paris Cullins, American comics artist
- Peter K. Cullins (1928–2012), American admiral
- Ryan Cullins, Canadian politician

== See also ==
- Collins (surname)
