= Quentin Blake Centre for Illustration =

Public gallery and museum in London, England

Coordinates: 51.535684°N 0.123868°W

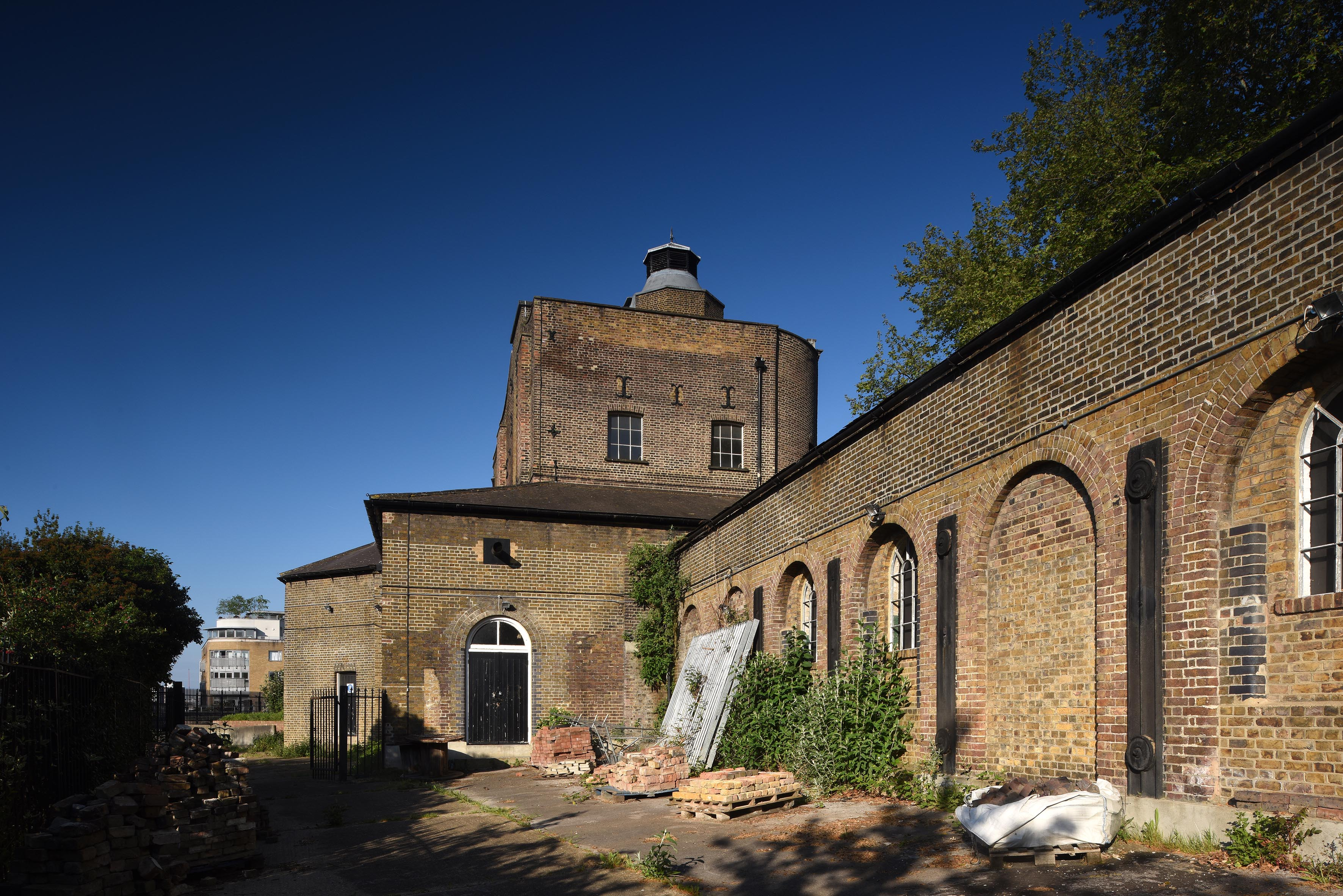
The Engine House and Coal Stores at New River Head, the site for the future Quentin Blake Centre for Illustration

Quentin Blake Centre for Illustration (formerly House of Illustration) is the only public arts organisation in the UK dedicated to illustration. It was founded by Quentin Blake in 2002 and is based in London, England. From 2014 to 2020, it was located at 2 Granary Square in the London Borough of Camden and called House of Illustration.

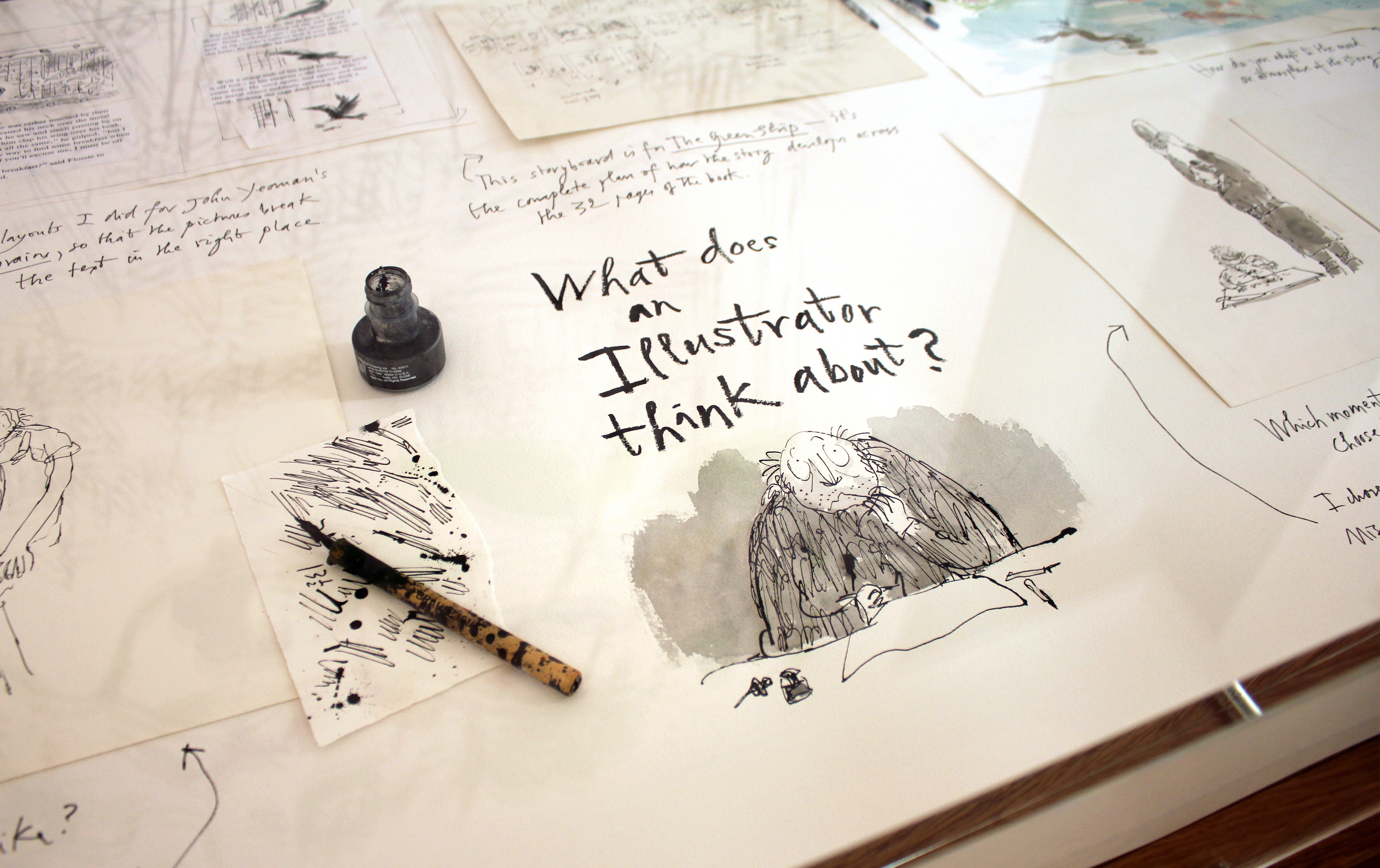
Quentin Blake: Inside Stories exhibition at House of Illustration, 2014

In July 2020 it was announced that the House of Illustration at Granary Square would relocate to a building in the London Borough of Islington and be renamed to become the Quentin Blake Centre for Illustration.

Previous House of Illustration exhibitions have shown a diverse range of illustration, including advertisements, animation, comic books and manga, children's literature, propaganda, political cartoons, scientific illustration and fashion design. Subjects have included Cuban graphic design, feminist comics and retrospectives of artists including Enid Marx, Tom of Finland, and Jacqueline Ayer.

== Relocation 2020-2026 ==
In July 2020 it was announced House of Illustration at Granary Square would close and that the organisation would relocate to industrial heritage site New River Head in the Clerkenwell area in the London Borough of Islington. The site's 18th- and 19th-century buildings were restored as part of a £12m capital campaign. The new site was named the Quentin Blake Centre for Illustration.

The new site opened on 5 June 2026, with renovations costing £12.5m. The space was paid for with funding from the National Lottery Heritage Fund, the London Borough of Islington, various trusts, and Blake's own investments. The centre features three exhibition galleries: one that is dedicated to Blake's work, and two other spaces with rotated exhibitions. There is also a public illustration library that holds more than 1,000 books, graphic novels, and zines. A café on site is home to a 5-metre illustration that Blake drew specifically for the centre.
