= Night Visitor (disambiguation) =

Night Visitor is a 1989 horror film.

Night Visitor may also refer to:

== Film ==
- The Night Visitor, a 1971 Swedish psychological thriller film

== Literature ==
- "The Night Visitor", a 1931 story by Arnold Bennett
- "The Night Visitor", a 1967 story by B. Traven
- The Night Visitor, a 1979 novel by Laura Wylie
- The Night Visitor, a 1999 novel by James D. Doss; the fifth installment in the Charlie Moon series
- The Night Visitor, a 2017 novel by Lucy Atkins
- The Night Visitor, a 2018 novel by Patrick Redmond
- The Night Visitor , a 2019 novel by Carol Goodman

== Music ==
- The Night Visitor (album), a 2011 album by Anna Ternheim

== Television ==
- "Incident of the Night Visitor", Rawhide season 3, episode 4 (1960)
- "Night Visitor", Dallas (1978) season 10, episode 17 (1987)
- "Night Visitor", The Ford Television Theatre season 5, episode 31 (1954)
- "Night Visitors", Bananas in Pyjamas series 6, episode 39 (2001)
- "Night Visitors", Logan's Run episode 12 (1978)
- "Night Visitors", Truth or Scare episode 11 (2001)
- "The Night Visitor", Archie Bunker's Place season 3, episode 13 (1982)
- "The Night Visitor", Petrocelli season 2, episode 17 (1976)
