= QLN =

QLN may refer to:

- Kollam Junction railway station, in Kerala, India, station code QLN
- Quantum Learning Network, an education and training organization based in Oceanside, California, US
