= Richard Everitt =

Richard Everitt may refer to:

- Murder of Richard Everitt (1978–1994), a 15-year-old British male killed in a racist attack in London
- Richard Everitt (producer) (1933–2004), British television producer
- Dick Everitt (1922–2012), Richard Ewart Everitt, English footballer

== See also ==
- Richard Everett (1609–1682), founder of Springfield, Massachusetts
