= Quantum Learning Network =

Education and training organization based in Oceanside, California

The Quantum Learning Network (QLN) is an education and training organization based in Oceanside, California. Prior to 2005, the organization was known as the Learning Forum.

The QLN's flagship program is SuperCamp, a summer camp program developed initially by Bobbi DePorter, Eric Jensen and Greg Simmons in 1982, designed to introduce teenagers to accelerated learning academic skills and valuable life skills. The SuperCamp program is now held annually at several locations across the United States and around the world. Since 1982, more than 40,000 students worldwide have attended SuperCamp.

The QLN also regularly runs Quantum Learning for Students, Quantum Learning for Teachers, Quantum Learning for Administrators and Quantum Learning for Business programs for schools, school districts and corporations. QLN's programs have been held across the world in countries including Canada, Mexico, Bermuda, the Dominican Republic, Switzerland, the United Kingdom, Russia, Singapore, Malaysia, Indonesia, Brunei, Thailand, South Korea, Taiwan and China. QLN also produces books, video and audiotapes, CDs and computer products about academic and life skills which are available around the world.

The QLN's founder and President is Bobbi DePorter, an educator and businesswoman who in the 1970s studied with Dr. Georgi Lozanov, who developed accelerated learning, and applied his methods to business and education.

Over the years, the QLN has been profiled in several publications including The Wall Street Journal, Chicago Tribune, Los Angeles Times and USA Today. Stories about QLN have also appeared on over 100 television and radio programs in the US and other countries. QLN's SuperCamp was honored in the "Touch America: Showcase of Model Learning Programs" held in Washington, D.C.
