= Horst Walter =

German painter

Horst Walter (14 June 1936; Pankow, Berlin – 15 May 2012; Berlin) was a contemporary German artist.

== Life ==
Born in Berlin during the Nazi regime, he grew up in the western part of the divided Berlin. He produced drawings and modern sculptures. In divided Berlin he protested against the Berlin Wall. After the Berlin Wall came down in 1989 he tried to remind the German public to keep parts of the Berlin Wall as a monument of memorial. To do this he started numberless performances in the so-called "No Man's Land" between the Potsdamer Platz and the Reichstag building.

== Projects (examples) ==
- 1985: "Zeichen setzten" Performances at Berlin Wall
- 1990: "Kulturprojekt Potsdamer Platz": Cafe 9.November at the former checkpoint Potsdamer Platz
- 1990: Potsdamerplatz: Keep The Wall Project- 118 pieces of the Berlin Wall
- 1991: Exhibition Voltaire in Potsdam
- 1992: Retrospektive in Kunsthaus Tacheles
- 1998: 1.place in the internationalen Mail-ART Kapos ART contest, Kaposvar; Mail Art. Hungary Budapest; Symposium. Barc Hungary
- 2003: opening of Mauerspechtmuseum
