= Gene Visich =

American baseball player (1926–2012)

- Utility player
- Born: October 26, 1926; Mount Vernon, New York, U.S.
- Died: May 7, 2012 (aged 85)
- Batted: Right Threw: Both

Teams
- Rockford Peaches (1948)

Career highlights and awards
- Women in Baseball – AAGPBL Permanent Display at Baseball Hall of Fame and Museum (1988)

Genevieve Felice Visich October 18, 1926 – May 7, 2012) was an American baseball player with the Rockford Peaches of the All-American Girls Professional Baseball League (AAGPBL) in 1948. She was an ambidextrous utility player.

Visich was a 10 time undefeated champion on Blockbusters in 1981, and won one more game on that show's finale in 1982.
