= Oktyabrʹ Emelʹyanenko =

Soviet physicist (1926–2012)

Oktyabrʹ V. Emelʹyanenko
- Born: Октябрь Васильевич Емельяненко; 7 November 1926; Leningrad, (Soviet Union) USSR
- Died: 25 May 2012 (aged 85); Saint Petersburg, (Russia) Russian Federation
- Education: Saint Petersburg State University
- Scientific career
- Fields: Physics
- Workplaces: Leningrad Physico-Technical Institute

Octyabrʹ V. Emelʹyanenko (7 November 1926, Leningrad - 27 May 2012, Saint Petersburg) was a Soviet physicist, Ph.D. in Physics and Mathematical Sciences. He did fundamental work in physics of III-V compound semiconductors, and made significant contributions to pave the way for the creation of the first semiconductor laser, optoelectronics, LEDs, solar cells, infrared detectors and other semiconductor devices.

== Biography ==
In 1945, Emelʹyanenko was called up for military service at the age of seventeen. Location Service, Eastern Front. After the Second World War was to re-enlist. While serving in the army in absentia received secondary and higher education. He graduated from the Physics Faculty of Saint Petersburg State University, enrolled in graduate school. From 1955 to 1989 he worked in the Laboratory of Semiconductor Nasledov D. (Ioffe Physical-Technical Institute of the Russian Academy of Sciences)

== Scientific work ==
Studies of III–V compounds in the Soviet Union were started in the early 1950s at the Physical-Technical Institute, USSR Academy of Sciences. In 1950, N. Goryunovа and A. Regel opened their semiconducting properties of III-V compounds on the example of indium antimonide

In the 1950s only the laboratory of Professor Heinrich Welker in Germany, and laboratory Dmitriy N. Nasledov in the Ioffe Physical-Technical Institute, USSR Academy of Sciences were engaged in studies of III–V compounds. All scientists in the field of semiconductors concentrated almost exclusively on germanium and silicon. It seemed that these elemental semiconductors, which brought electronics to a new level, could not be surpassed by any compound semiconductor.

The first significant report on studies of III–V semi-conductors (InSb, InAs) at the Physical-Technical Institute was made by Nasledov at the First All-Union Conference on Semiconductors (Leningrad, 1956). He mentioned (among other phenomena) that neither electrical conductivity nor the Hall effect depend on temperature in new III–V compounds. Many scientists considered this observation strange and even accidental. However, it was found shortly afterwards that the above temperature independence is the consequence of profound degeneracy in the electron gas, which is typical of heavily doped (then, simply “impure”) III–V crystals. Fundamentally new phenomena in these crystals gave rise to a new field in the physics of semiconductors, specifically, the physics of heavily doped semiconductors. This researches was conducted group headed by O. Emelianenko in the laboratory D. Nasledov

A team led by O. Emelianenko continued fundamental research of phenomena transport in a wide class of III-V compounds (solid solutions and structures). The most interesting were: the study of the impurity band; Later, discovery of giant magnetoresistance when driving vehicles on impurities; the investigation of the metal–semiconductor transition in various materials compounds III–V, as well as the determination of the origin of negative (quantum) magnetoresistance (discovered by a team Emelianenko even earlier, in 1958).

The results obtained by O. Emelianenko and his team are included in the modern understanding of semiconducting properties of compounds III-V.

== Links ==
- https://books.google.com/books?id=r-WzXVaKctIC&dq=GaAs++Nasledov+Emel%E2%80%99yanenko&pg=PA468
- http://dn.nasledov.com/nasledov.pdf
- http://library.eltech.ru/cgi-bin/irbis64r_11/cgiirbis_64.exe?LNG=&P21DBN=GK&I21DBN=GK_PRINT&S21FMT=fullw_print&C21COM=F&Z21MFN=27457
- http://www.dissercat.com/content/osobennosti-rezistivnykh-i-galvanomagnitnykh-yavlenii-v-anizotropnykh-poluprovodnikakh
- http://www.issp.ac.ru/ebooks/disser/Sergeev_G_S.pdf
- http://www.dissercat.com/content/vliyanie-neravnovesnykh-sostoyanii-medi-na-fotoprovodimost-fosfida-galliya
- http://www.dissercat.com/content/vliyanie-elektricheskogo-polya-na-magnitosoprotivlenie-germaniya-i-armenida-galliya
