= Juan Manuel Montero Vázquez =

- Born: 29 December 1947; Palencia, Spain
- Died: 21 May 2012 (aged 64); Tel Aviv, Israel
- Military career
- Allegiance: Spain
- Branch: Spanish Army
- Service years: 1972–2012
- Rank: General de División Médico
- Commands: Spanish medical corps

Juan Manuel Montero Vázquez (29 December 1947 – 21 May 2012) was a Spanish military who held the rank of a General de División Médico and served as the surgeon general of the Spanish armed medical service, called the Inspector General de Sanidad de la Defensa.

Montero was born in Palencia. He joined the army in the rank of a Teniente (MC) in 1972 and held several assignments at the Gómez Ulla Military Hospital.

He was president of the Asociación Española de Endoscopia Digestiva.

In May 2012, while participating a special NATO medical officials conference in Tel Aviv, Israel, Montero Vázquez died suddenly of heart failure. He was 64.
