= Tom Fuentes =

American politician

Thomas A. Fuentes (October 16, 1948 – May 18, 2012) was an American political leader who was chairman of the Republican Party of Orange County in California from 1985 to 2004. In the mid-1990s, Republicans held all of the county's legislative and congressional seats, showing it to be one of the most Republican large populous counties in the country.

Fuentes moved to Orange County in 1962 where he worked in Richard Nixon's gubernatorial campaign. He traced his lineage back six generations to Mexican immigrants. Fuentes died on May 18, 2012, in Lake Forest, California from complications from liver cancer.
