= Ekalavyan (novelist) =

Indian novelist

KM Mathew
- Born: KM Mathew; 14 August 1934; Kunnamkulam, India
- Died: 6 May 2012 (aged 77); Thrissur, India
- Occupations: Novelist, short story writer
- Spouse: Leelamani (1962-2012)
- Writing career
- Pen name: Ekalavyan
- Language: Malayalam
- Subjects: Indian Army, Indian Americans, Ahmednagar
- Notable work: Trench

KM Mathew (1934-2012), popularly known by his pen name Ekalavyan, was an Indian writer who wrote in Malayalam. He has shown the army life to the common man through his novels.

== Early life ==
Born in Kunnamkulam, in Thrissur district, he started his career in Indian Army in 1953 as a soldier. He fought in the Indo-Pakistani War of 1965. Three years later, he published his first short story "Rundu Logam Oru Jeevitham" in Mathrubhumi Weekly

He served in the military for 28 years. He then spent 10 years doing civil work in a military office. In his lifetime, he wrote 33 novels, three short stories and screenplay for a television serial. He is survived by his wife Leelamani and sons Salil Mathew and Dr. Sunil Mathews.

== Novels and short stories ==
- Randu Lokam Oru Jeevitham
- Kallu
- Daaham
- Shivajikkunnukal
- Trench
- Kayam
- Sarppavisham
- Chakravyooham
- Anali
- Neerali
- Darppanam
- Praharam
- Mounanombarangal
- Karmaantham
- Mrigathrishna
- Greeshmavarshangal
- Pingamikal
- Chora Chinthiyavar
- Aarum Swanthamalla
- Aparna
- Papathinte Shambalam
- Kadankathayile Kathapathrangal
- Charithram Urangunna Peetabhoomi
- Kudumbathinte Manam
- Daivathinte Bhandaram
- Prathibimbangal
- Sandhya
- Ayanam
- Parakkan Mohichavar
- Chirakatta Paravakal
- Ravukal Illatha Rappadikal
- Chuzhikal
- Yudha Bhoomi
- Ente Vazhi
- Kamini Priya Kamini
- Kadalasu Pookkal
- Chanchala
- Enthu Nedi
- Sundarimare Sookshikkuka
- Panam
- Orittu Snehathinai
- Jeevithathinte Mukhangal

== Movie Names ==
- Manassa Vacha Karmmana
- Ayanam
- Kanchanam
- Swayamvaram (Television Serial)
