= Harold K. Hoskins =

American pilot and Tuskegee Airman (1927–2012)

Harold K. Hoskins, Sr. (15 February 1927 Big Sandy, Texas – 1 May 2012) was an American pilot and Tuskegee Airman who was awarded the Congressional Gold Medal in 2007. He trained during World War II and served during the Korean War and the Vietnam War. In 1945, he joined the U.S. Army at age 18 and learned to fly at Alabama's Tuskegee Army Air Field. In 1971, he retired as a U.S. Air Force lieutenant colonel after logging 9500 flight hours. Hoskins later become assistant vice president of student affairs at California State University in Hayward.
