= Alain Fossoul =

Belgian footballer

Personal information
- Date of birth: 31 December 1928
- Date of death: 9 May 2012 (aged 83)
- Position: Defender

Senior career*
Years	Team	Apps	(Gls)
1946–1955	Anderlecht		
1948–1949	→ Boom (loan)		
1955–1957	Jette		
- * Club domestic league appearances and goals

Alain Fossoul (31 December 1928 – 9 May 2012) was a Belgian footballer who played as a defender.

== Career ==
Fossoul played for Anderlecht, Boom and Jette. While with Anderlecht, Fossoul won the Belgian Pro League five times and the Belgian Cup once.
