= Ann Rosener =

American photographer (1914–2012)

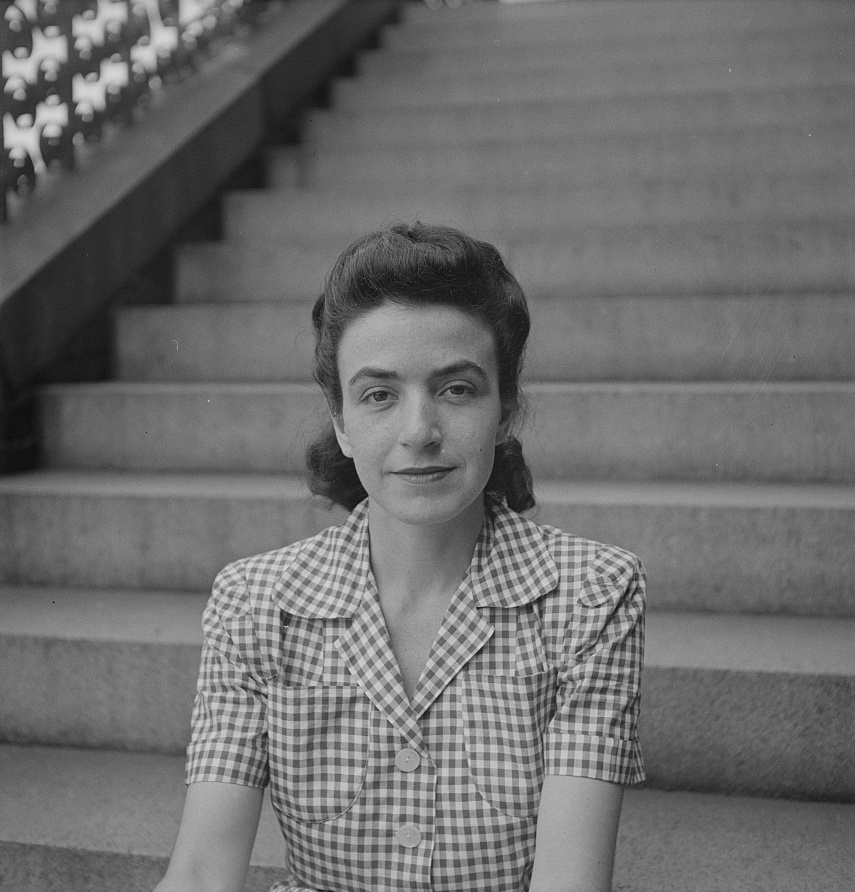
- portrait
- Born: November 25, 1914
- Died: May 19, 2012 (aged 97)
- Education: Smith College
- Known for: photo-journalist
- Movement: Farm Security Administration

Ann Rosener (November 25, 1914 – May 19, 2012) was an American photojournalist who is remembered for her photographs of home front activities for the Farm Security Administration and the United States Office of War Information in 1942–43.

== Biography ==
The daughter of well-to-do parents in the San Francisco area, Rosener graduated from Smith College in 1935. From about June 1941 until June 1943, she photographed for the Farm Security Administration in Washington, D.C., Maryland, Iowa, Wisconsin, Michigan, Illinois and California. Her images cover women handling men's jobs and girls producing gas masks or working as mechanics. She also illustrated stories showing how Americans were working together to build tanks and planes, irrespective of creed or colour. Many photographs show the efforts of handicapped workers. Her obituary in the San Francisco Chronicle refers to her

striking photos highlighting the sudden breakthrough of women in industry, performing work that had long been a male preserve.

In the 1950s, Rosener worked as a fashion photographer in Hollywood but returned to the San Francisco area in the 1960s. From 1964, she worked for Stanford University designing exhibition catalogues. From 1977, she published works by little-known writers. She died in Menlo Park in May 2012.

== Gallery ==
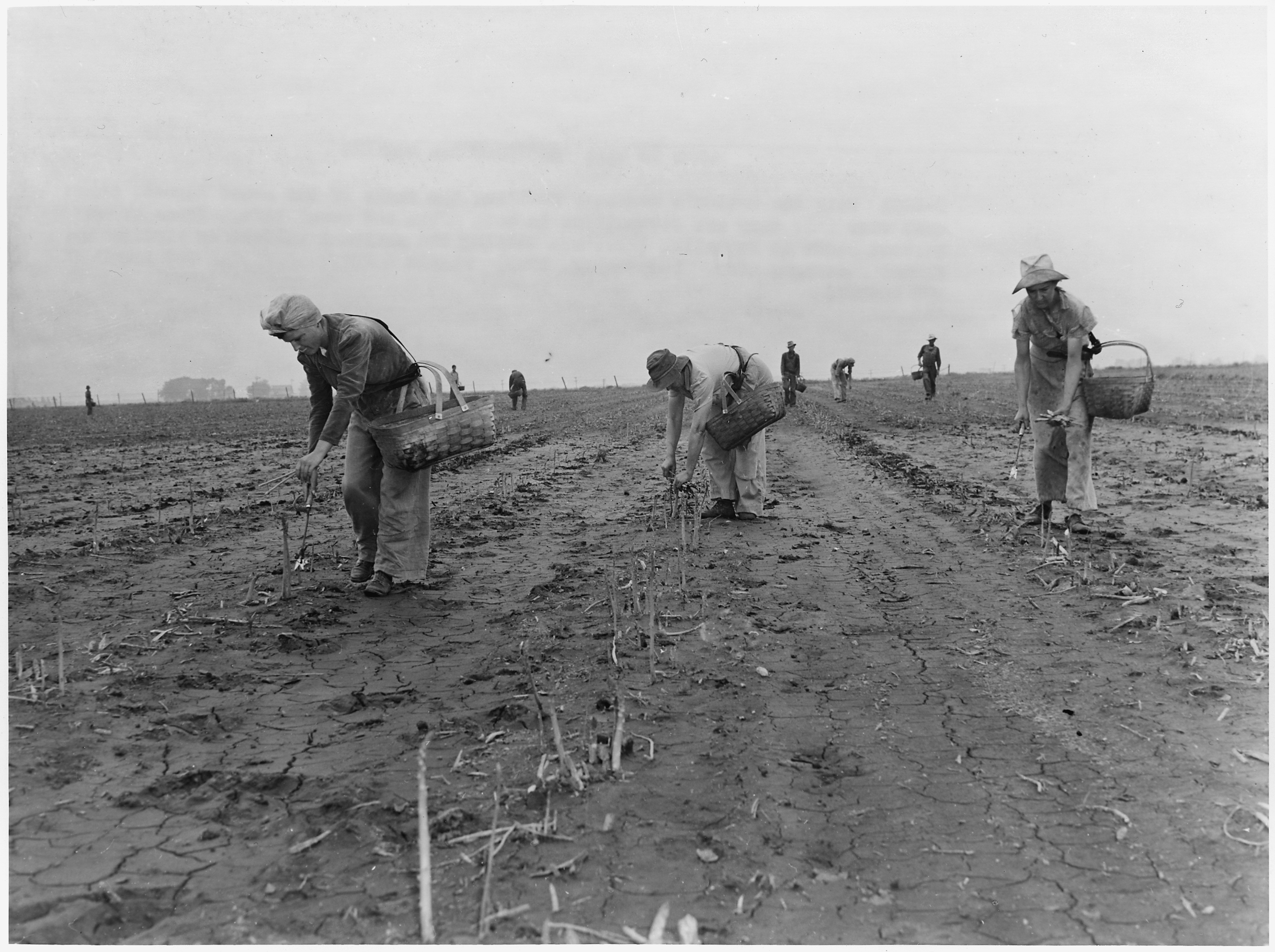
These women harvest hands in Rochelle, Illinois, are helping the national welfare by picking the summer asparagus crop

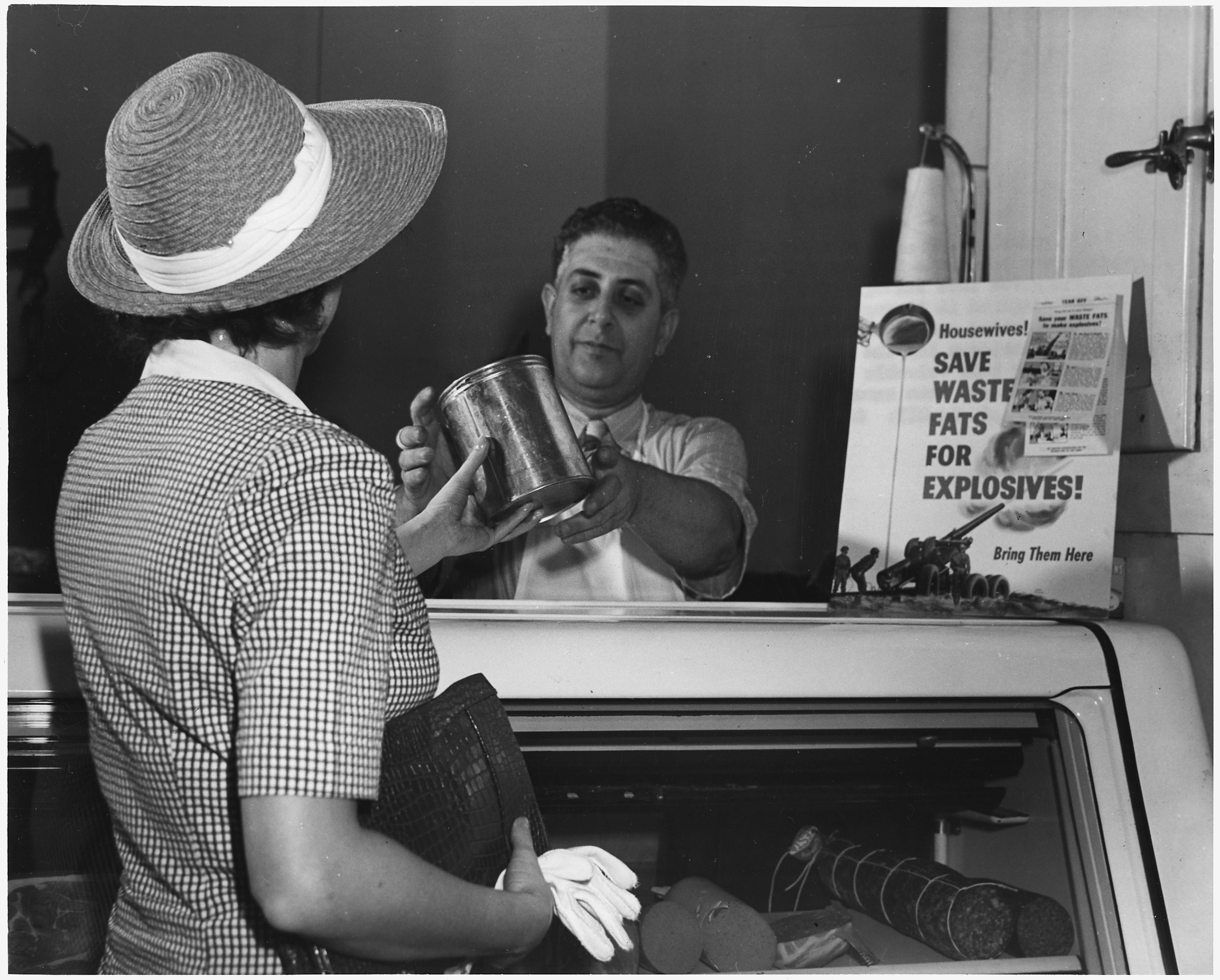
Butchers will pay householdersfor the fat and sell it to rendering plants where it will be processed into ammunition.

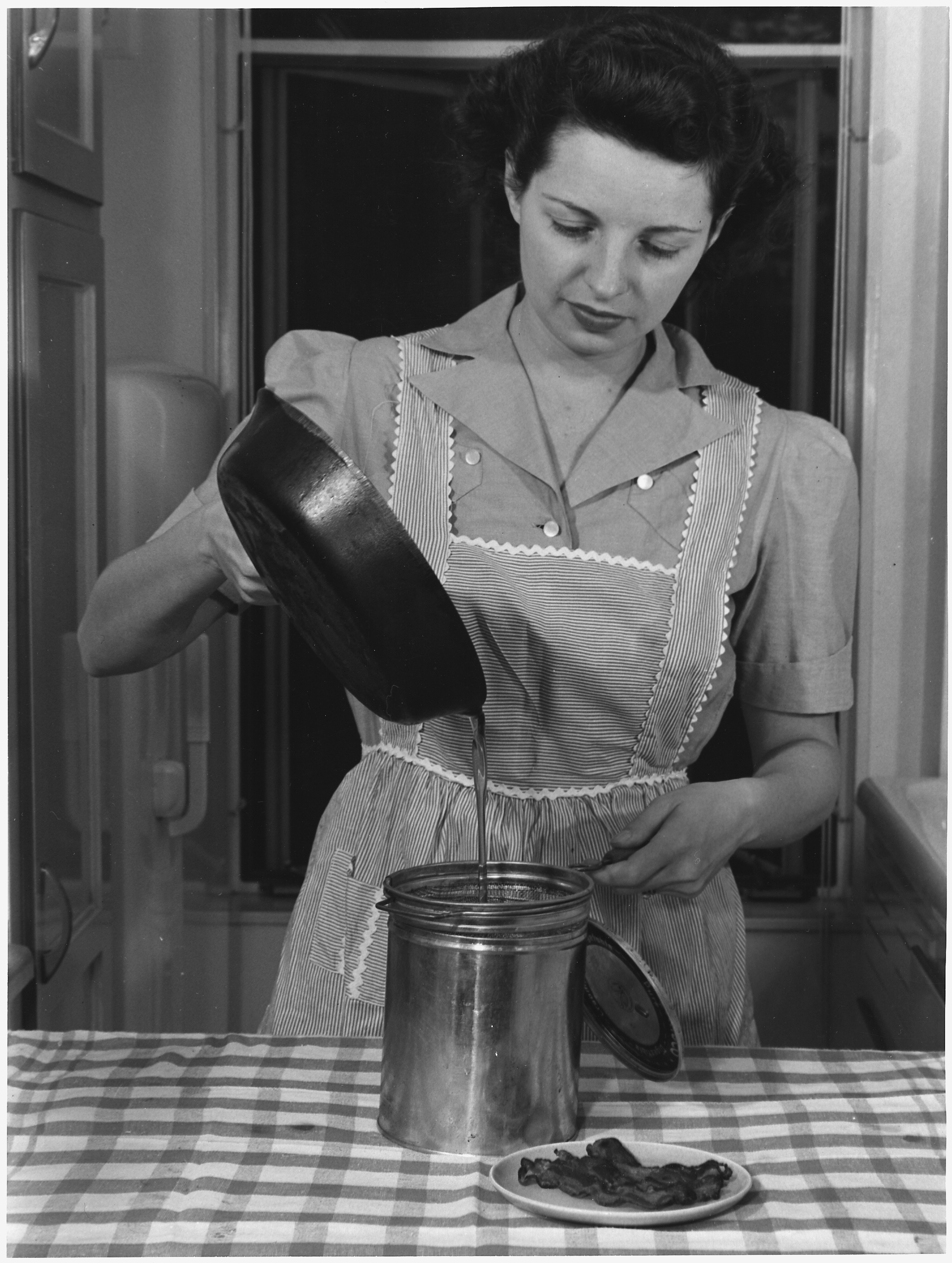
A soldier of the home front saves all waste fats and greases so that they can be processed into ammunition.

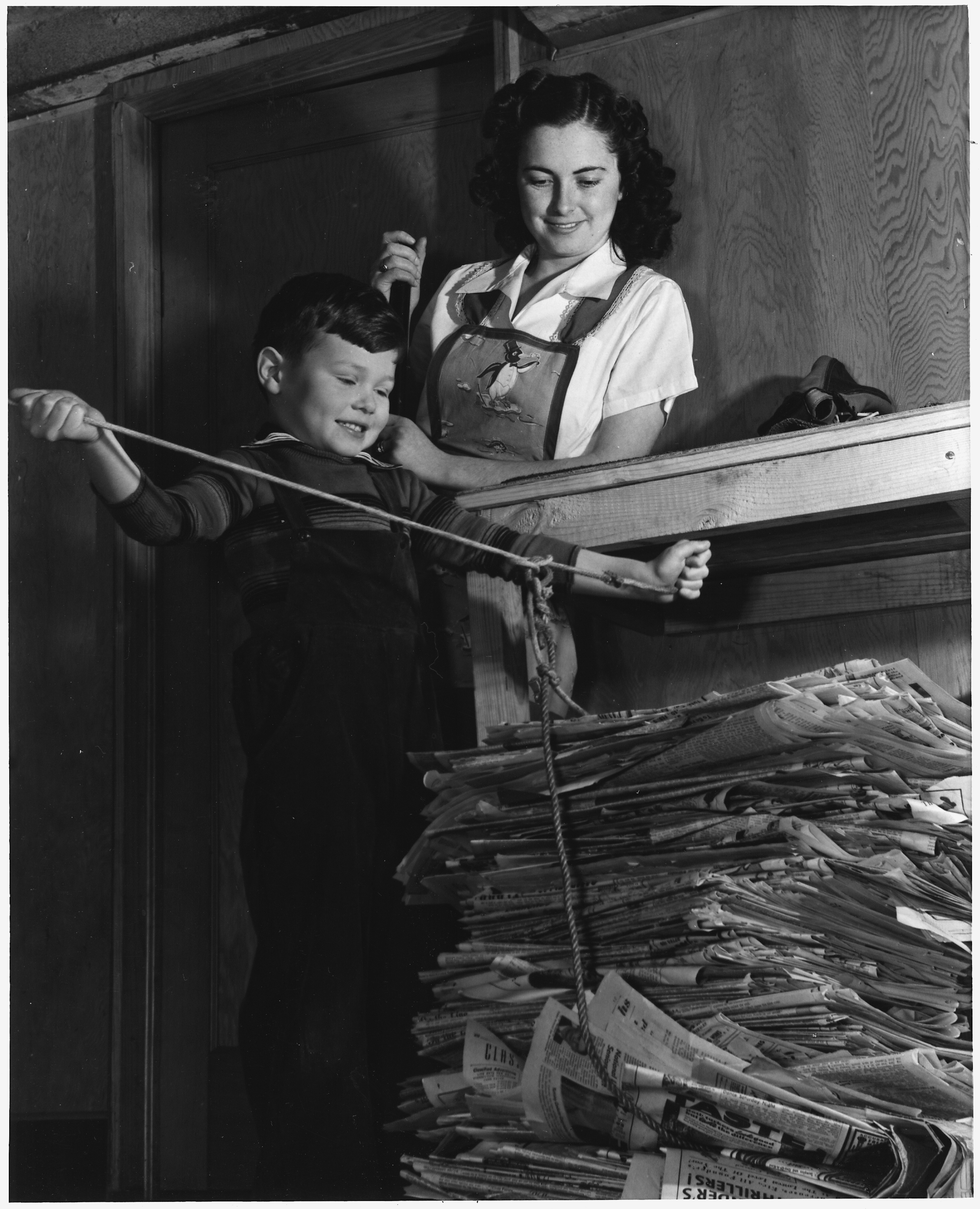
Conservation of waste paper will save millions annually for Uncle Sam.

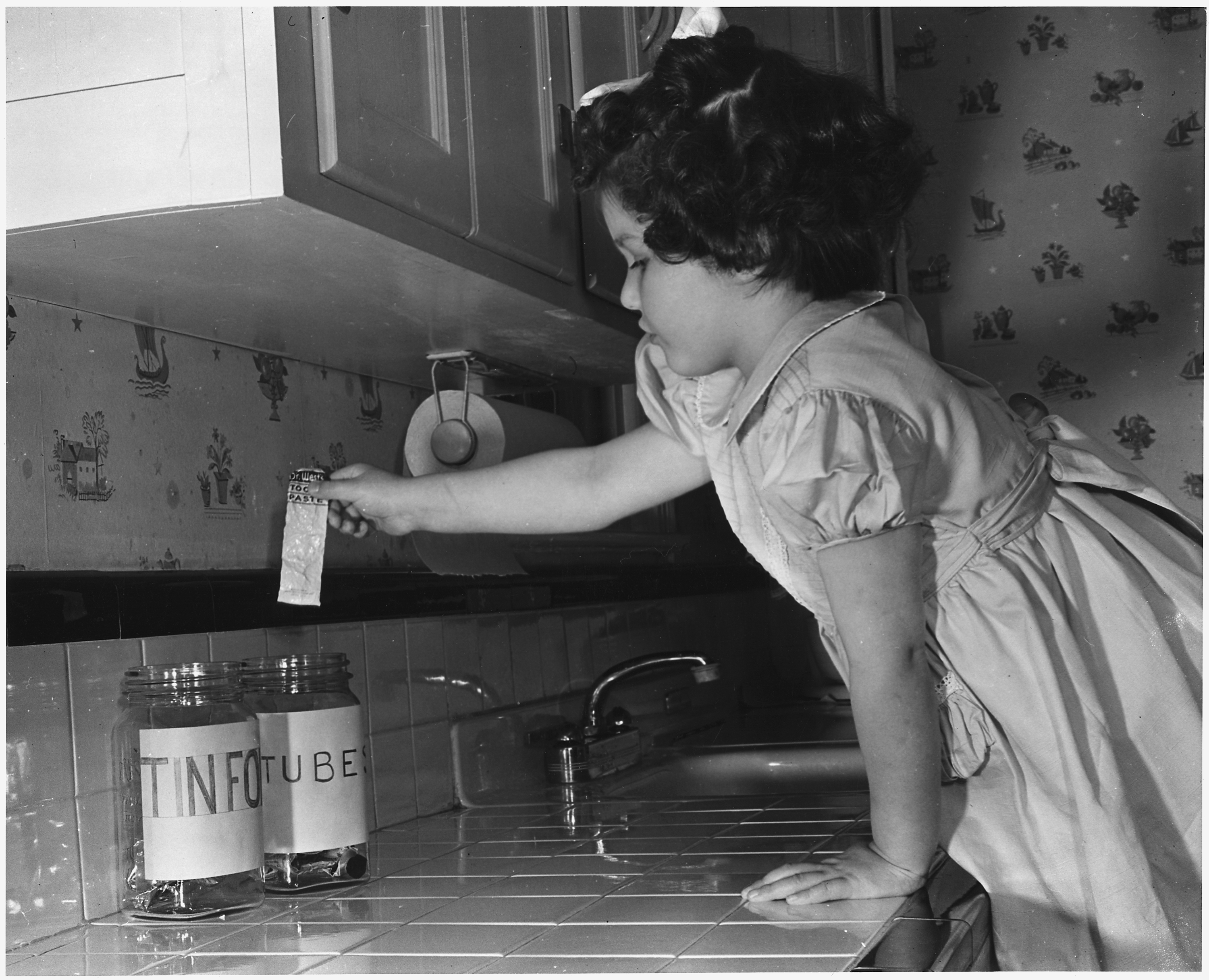
Vital tin and alloy metals are conserved by this procedure

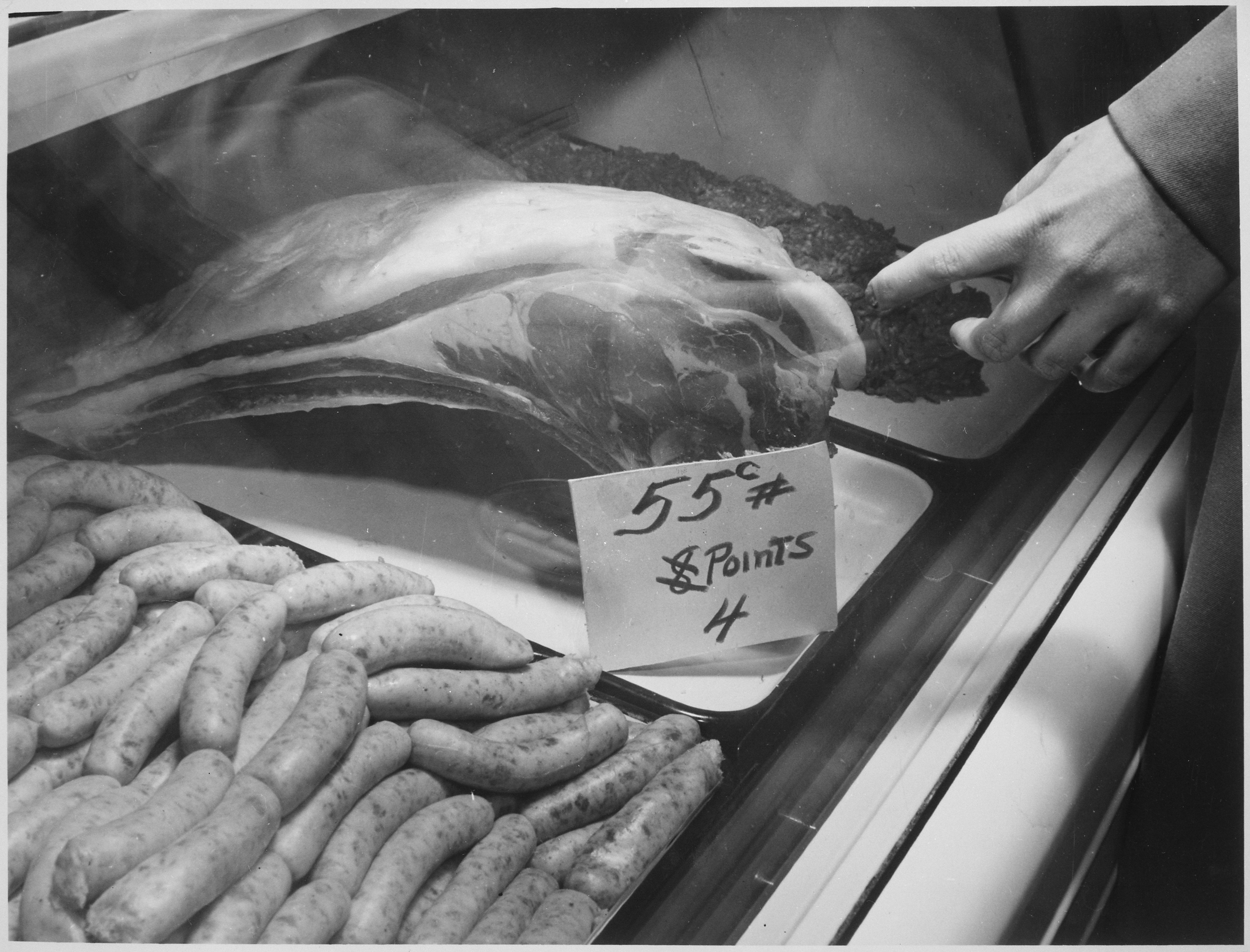
If the points are cut, so must the price be. Slashed points without slashed prices are one of the surest clues to...
