= Paul Sussman =

English author and archaeologist (1966–2012)

Paul Nicholas Sussman (11 July 1966 in Beaconsfield – 31 May 2012) was a best-selling English author, archaeologist and journalist. His novels were described by The Independent as "the intelligent reader's answer to The Da Vinci Code".

== Biography ==
Paul Sussman was the only son of Stanley, a sales manager for a textile manufacturer, and Sue, an actress-turned-psychoanalyst. After a few years in Hampstead the family moved to Northwood in north-west London. He was educated at Merchant Taylors' School and St. John's College, Cambridge, where he won a Joseph Larmor Award and a boxing blue and was lead singer in a college band, Dr and the Glasscocks. His novels have been translated into 33 languages and are set mainly in Egypt, where he worked for many years as a field archaeologist, notably with the Amarna Royal Tombs Project in the Valley of the Kings.

Among other finds, at Tomb KV56, in the Valley of the Kings, he unearthed the first items of pharaonic jewellery to have been excavated in the Valley since the discovery of Tutankhamun in 1922. As a journalist, he was a long-time contributor to The Big Issue, where he won a Periodical Publishers Association Columnist of the Year Award for his satirical "In The News" column. He also wrote for, among others, The Independent, The Guardian, The Evening Standard, The Daily Telegraph, The Spectator, Cosmopolitan and CNN.com.

== Death ==
On 31 May 2012, Sussman died suddenly after suffering a ruptured aneurysm. He was survived by his wife and two sons.

== Books ==
=== Fiction ===
- The Lost Army of Cambyses (2002) — Yusuf Khalifa of the Luxor Police
- The Last Secret of the Temple (2005) — Yusuf Khalifa of the Luxor Police and Jerusalem detective Arieh Ben-Roi
- The Hidden Oasis (2009)
- The Labyrinth of Osiris (June 2012) — Yusuf Khalifa and Arieh Ben-Roi
- The Final Testimony of Raphael Ignatius Phoenix (2014)

=== Non-fiction ===
- The Ultimate Encyclopaedia of the Movies (1994) (contributor)
- Death by Spaghetti...: Bizarre, Baffling and Bonkers True: Stories from In The News (1996)
