= Hugo Gottfrit =

Argentine footballer

Personal information
- Full name: Hugo Marcelino Gottfrit
- Date of birth: 9 January 1951
- Place of birth: Darregueira, Buenos Aires, Argentina
- Date of death: 16 May 2012 (aged 61)
- Place of death: La Plata, Argentina
- Position: Central defender

Senior career*
Years	Team	Apps	(Gls)
1970–1976	Gimnasia La Plata	225	(5)
1976–1978	Atlético Potosino	69	(2)
1978–1980	Atlante	29	(0)
1981	Gimnasia La Plata	5	(0)
- * Club domestic league appearances and goals

Hugo Marcelino Gottfrit (9 January 1951 – 16 May 2012) was an Argentine football defender who played in the Argentine Primera División and Liga MX México Primera División.

== Career ==
Born in Darregueira, Buenos Aires, Gottfrit began playing football with local side Darregueira F.C. He began his professional career with Argentine first division club Gimnasia y Esgrima de La Plata, and he would captain the club during the 1975 season. In 1976, Gottfrit joined Primera División side Atlético Potosino. He would spend the next five seasons in Mexico, joining Atlante F.C. after two seasons with Potosino. In 1981, Gottfrit returned to Gimnasia La Plata where he would finish his career in the second division.

He played for Argentina at the youth level in 1973.

== Personal ==
On 16 May 2012, Gottfrit died after being in the hospital for several days at age 61.
