= Rose Mary Glaser =

American baseball player

- Utility player
- Born: October 22, 1921
- Died: May 11, 2012 (aged 90); Springfield Township, Ohio, U.S.
- Batted: Right Threw: Right

debut
- 1944

Last appearance
- 1944

Teams
- Kenosha Comets (1944)

Rose Mary Glaser (October 21, 1921 – May 11, 2012) played for the Kenosha Comets of the All-American Girls Professional Baseball League (AAGPBL) in 1944. A utility player, she appeared in 10 games for the club. She was right-handed. Her nickname was Hap.
