= Tyrone Breuninger =

American trombonist

Tyrone Breuninger (died May 6, 2012) was an American trombonist with the Philadelphia Orchestra as well as a euphonium/trombone/tuba teacher from Rowan University, located in Glassboro, New Jersey. Throughout his career, he also did freelance solo performances. His degrees include a Bachelor of Science in music education and an MM of music in performance. He also arranged a version of Georg Philipp Telemann's Sonata in G minor for euphonium.

== Ensembles and events ==
- The Philadelphia Orchestra (1967–1999)
  - Associate principal trombone
  - Solo euphonium
- The Atlantic Brass Band (at Rowan University)
  - Associate conductor
- Luzerne Music Festival (Lake Luzerne, New York)
  - Coordinator of brass activities
- EU-TU Quartet (euphonium and tuba)
- The Festive Brass Quintet

== Albums ==
Breuninger recorded one album, The Classic Euphonium, containing within it:

1. "Wee Cooper of Fife" - Traditional
2. "Andante" (from Concerto for Double Bass) - Antonio Capuzzi
3. "Rondo" (from Concerto for Double Bass) - Antonio Capuzzi
4. "Aubade" - Philip Sparke
5. "Moderato" (from Euphonium Concerto) - Joseph Horovitz
6. "Lento" (from Euphonium Concerto) - Joseph Horovitz
7. "Scherzando" (from Euphonium Concerto) - Joseph Horovitz
8. "Romance" - Victor Ewald
9. "Rhapsody for Euphonium" - James Curnow
10. "My Heart at Thy Sweet Voice" - Camille Saint-Saëns
11. "Fantasy" - Philip Sparke

== Sources ==
- https://web.archive.org/web/20050326032805/http://www.rowan.edu/fpa/music/our_assets/bio/breuninger.html
- http://www.goodnewsmusic.com/audiocds/8913581.html
- http://dwerden.com/emg/recordingsearch.cfm?Song=&Composer=&AlbTitle=&Artist=Breuninger%2C+Tyrone&doSearch=1
