= Pierre Ceyrac (Jesuit) =

French Jesuit priest

Pierre Ceyrac (4 February 1914 – 30 May 2012) was a French Jesuit priest who worked for 75 years outside his home country. He was celebrated for his work in both France and India, earning the French Légion d'honneur in 2005.

== Personal life ==
Pierre Ceyrac was born in Meyssac, Corrèze into a middle-class Catholic family. The second oldest of six children, he studied at St. Joseph Boarding School in Sarlat, along with all his brothers, including Francois Ceyrac, who would later go on to be president of the National Council of French Employers from 1972 to 1981.

== Career ==
Ceyrac was attracted to a religious vocation early in life and in October 1931, became a novice of the Society of Jesus.

At the age of 23, he earned a degree in Classical Letters and Philology from Sorbonne. He then chose to follow in the footsteps of his uncle Charles Ceyrac, who had been a Jesuit missionary in Southern India.

In 1937, he sailed from Marseille to India, where he would spend the rest of his life. He earned a degree in Tamil and Sanskrit from Pachaiyappa’s College where he also studied Vedanta and the Upanishads.

He was ordained as a priest in 1945 at the Jesuit Seminary in Kurseong, West Bengal and finished his tertianship in 1947. Soon after, he was named as the chaplain to St. Joseph's College in Tiruchirappalli. In 1955, he became chaplain of the All India Catholic University Federation, a post he held until 1967. Inspired by Mohandas Gandhi and Jawaharlal Nehru, he began working towards improving living conditions for the poorest Indians, notably the Untouchables.

His first major project began in 1957, when he and groups of students worked to help the poor in a village near Pondicherry. They built roads, houses, and clinics in a place they called "Cherian Nagar" where 20,000 Hindus, Muslims, and Christians lived. With the help of donations from abroad as well as European and Indian volunteers, his organization was able to help thousands more across Southern India.

In 1969, he established a cooperative farm in Manamadurai, Tamil Nadu that provided thousands of villagers with food and a place to work, helping over 250,000 people. Then, in the villages around the farm he started the "Thousand Wells" (Mille puits) campaign that taught the villagers how to farm previously unusable land.

Following a call in 1980 from Father Arrupe, Superior General of the Jesuits and founder of the Jesuit Refugee Service, he volunteered to help the thousands of Cambodians entering Thailand, fleeing the Khmer Rouge. He taught at the Khao-I-Dang and Site Two refugee camps, where he learned the Khmer language. He ended his work there in 1992, and returned to India.

After his return to Chennai, he created the Ambukarangal Centres near Tindivanam, Tamil Nadu. Taking their name from a word meaning "open hands," these are places where orphans and children from very poor families can receive shelter, food, health care and education, as well as love and emotional support.

Father Ceyrac continued his work well into his nineties, coming to the aid of fishing villages affected by the 2004 Indian Ocean tsunami. He spent the last years of his life teaching at Loyola College in Chennai. Throughout his life, he campaigned for the rights and dignity of the Dalits and was an advocate for human rights. He died 30 May 2012, at the age of 98 in Chennai.
