= Mark Deutch =

Russian journalist and columnist (1945–2012)

Mark Mikhaylovich Deutch
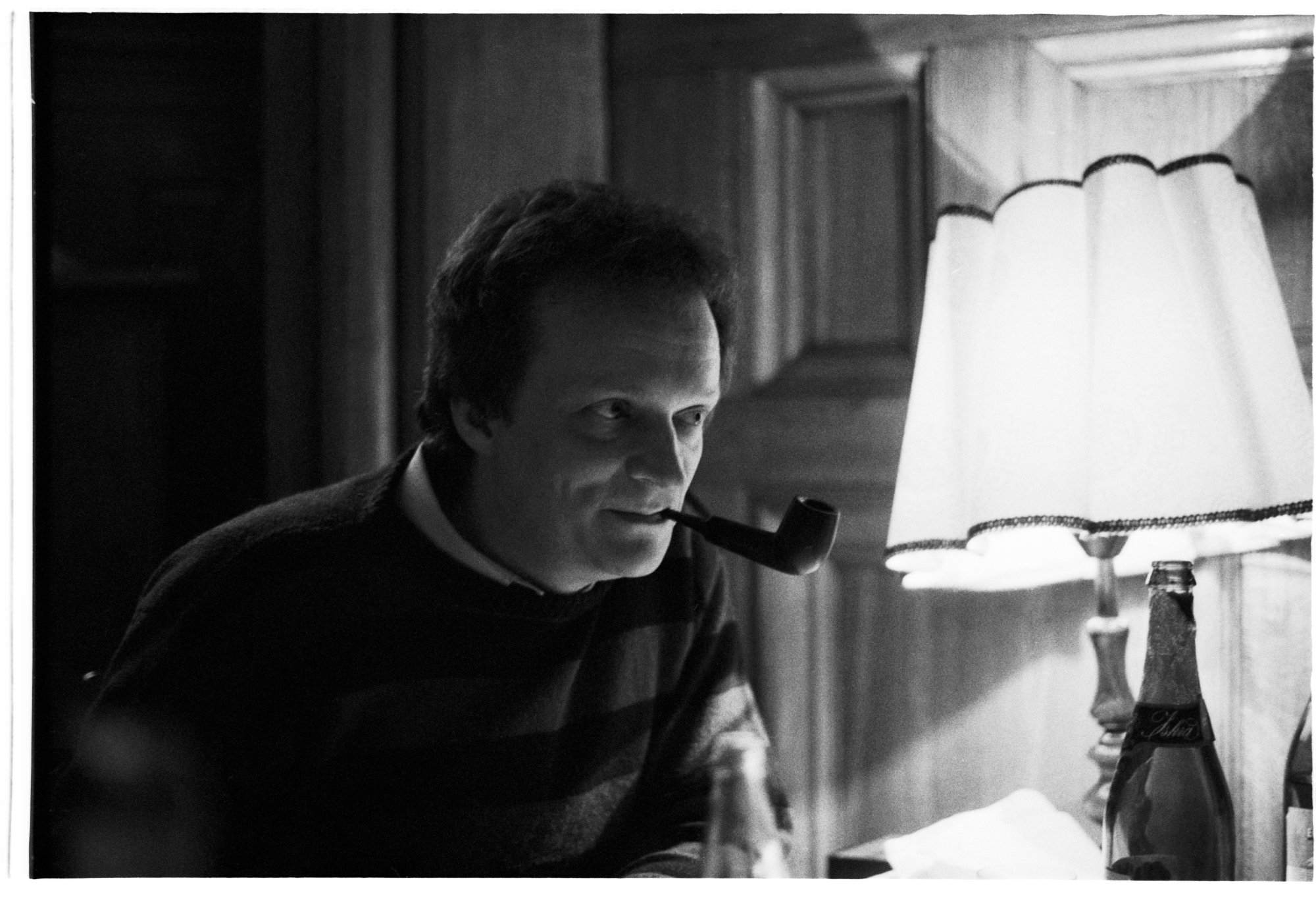
- Mark Deutch at the Home of the Union of Soviet Writers, May 1990
- Born: January 26, 1945
- Died: May 2, 2012 (aged 67)
- Occupations: Journalist; columnist; author
- Known for: Political commentary
- Notable work: Several books on politics

Mark Mikhaylovich Deutch (also Deutsch, Deich or Deitch; Russian: Марк Михайлович Дейч; 26 January 1945 – 2 May 2012) was a Russian journalist and columnist for Moskovskij Komsomolets. He became widely known while working with Radio Free Europe/Radio Liberty. He authored several books on politics.

== Bibliography ==
- «Память» как она есть / Марк Дейч, Леонид Журавлёв. — М.: Владивосток: МП «Цунами», 1991. — 188 с. — ISBN 5-86532-006-8
- На «Свободе»: [Ст., очерки и репортажи коммент. радиостанции «Свобода»] / Марк Дейч. — М.: Культ. инициатива: Феникс, 1992. — 249 с. — ISBN 5-85042-061-4
- Коричневые / Марк Дейч; Рис. А. Меринова. — М.: ТЕРРА — Кн. клуб, 2003 (ОАО Яросл. полигр. комб.). — 428 с. — ISBN 5-275-00760-4
  (Literally translated as "The Browns", with the intended meaning "Brownshirts"), a book about neonazism in Russia
- Клио в багровых тонах: Солженицын и евреи / Марк Дейч. — М.: Детектив-Пресс, 2006 (Тверь: Тверской полиграфкомбинат). — 221 с. — (Детектив-Пресс. Расследование издательства). — ISBN 5-89935-073-3
