= Alfred Doll-Steinberg =

British chemical engineer

- Born: 20 September 1933; Vienna, Austria
- Died: 9 May 2012 (aged 78); London, England
- Resting place: Jerusalem, Israel
- Education: Gonville and Caius College, Cambridge
- Occupation: Chemical Engineer
- Known for: Lloyd's of London
- Spouse: Gerda Adele (m. 1965)
- Children: 3
- Relatives: Stuart Lipton (in-laws)

Alfred Doll-Steinberg (20 September 1933 – 9 May 2012) was a British chemical engineer, who made a significant contribution to the design and economics of oil refinery and petrochemical plant design in its early days. In the early 1990s, he became the most vociferous of the Lloyd’s "names" who suffered heavy losses in the London insurance market, and was chairman of the Gooda Walker and Wellington action groups. Lloyd's offered a £900 million settlement in due course and in response to political pressure and legal action by the numerous "names" groups.

== Early life ==
Alfred Doll-Steinberg was born in Vienna, the son of Marcus Doll-Steinberg, who worked for the government there until the Austrian Nazis sacked all Jews from government jobs, and they moved to Nottingham, England. He received a scholarship to Gonville and Caius College, Cambridge, where he took a double First in mathematics and chemistry.

== Career ==
He went on to make a career in the design of oil refineries and petrochemical plants, working for oil companies in London and New York, for the Institut Français du Petrole in Paris, and later for his own consultancy firm. His projects included a refinery at Larnaca, Cyprus, and drillings in the Negev desert in Israel. He was a director of several private companies, including British Tours, a bespoke travel business which he co-founded in 1958. Latterly he was chairman of Tribeka, founded by his son Daniel Doll-Steinberg, which develops technology enabling retailers to manufacture and sell digital entertainment products “on demand”. Tribeka has won a Wall Street Journal Innovation Award and is a Deloitte European Retail Solution of the Year.

In 1988 he founded a scholarship at Gonville and Caius College, the James Arthur Ramsay Prize.

== Personal life ==
Alfred married Gerda in 1965, and they had two sons and a daughter. Gerda is a Director of British Tours Ltd a company she ran and built up in the 1970s after being founded by Alfred when he graduated from Cambridge.

Their son Jason has written sketches for TV shows such as Bruiser (TV series), is currently working on a film about Cuba with David Soul and is a Director of British Tours Ltd

Their son Daniel is married to Sarah, the daughter of Stuart Lipton.
