= Bobby Bulch =

English footballer

Personal information
- Full name: Robert Stephen Bulch
- Date of birth: 1 January 1933
- Place of birth: Washington, England
- Date of death: 8 May 2012 (aged 79)
- Place of death: Washington, England
- Position: Wing half

Youth career
- Newcastle Boys

Senior career*
Years	Team	Apps	(Gls)
1948–1949	Chelsea		
- Washington
1953–1958	Notts County	27	(1)
1958–1960	Darlington	44	(1)
- Ashington
- * Club domestic league appearances and goals

Robert Stephen Bulch (1 January 1933 – 8 May 2012) was an English footballer who made 71 appearances in the Football League playing as a wing half for Notts County and Darlington in the 1950s. He was picked up by Notts County when his RAF Syerston side played them in a friendly. After he was de-mobbed from his national service on 15 March 1953, he was signed up by the Magpies. He also played non-league football for clubs including Washington and Hartlepool United.

In an autobiographical article written by Bobby Bulch himself it is written:

"I was signed at a rate of £7 a week and £20 per week when I played First Team football. We were not given a BMW to use, and I remember the hassle of crossing London by tube train to get to the stadium of Chelsea, where among other chores I cleaned Roy Bentley's boots. Mind you, when I was at Nottingham Tony Hatley cleaned MY boots."

"Football remained my chosen sport, and when in the R.A.F. I played for both camp and command teams. One of our matches was away against Notts County Colts in a Cup Tie. After the game the Notts County coach invited me to play for the team and I made several appearances for both Colts and their reserve team that season.

On demob from the R.A.F. I signed as a professional player and stayed with them until 1958. During my time with Notts County I had been in a successful Midland League side winning the league in 1954/5. I also played in the 1955/6 and 56/57 teams. I enjoyed my football in the first team, before leaving in 1958.

I was then transferred to Darlington FC and I was with them for two seasons. The next season saw me with Hartlepool United but by then I just could not compete at that level any longer, having sustained a serious knee injury that stayed with me from my Darlington days. I then retired from football."

When talking about his later life, he said, "Sport has always been my main interest. Football, Golfing (9 handicap) and Snooker. Football, but only as a viewer in recent years. Golf is still an interest even after having held a 9 handicap for nearly twenty years, snooker in recent times because it was a far less strenuous activity. I also enjoy gardening, fitting the necessary housework in between, as my wife still works for a living, and of course watching T.V. with my grandchildren".

Bobby's family later made this article freely available to the people of Washington and was reproduced verbatim.
