= Alan Britton =

New Zealand cricketer

Personal information
- Full name: Alan Edward Law Britton
- Born: 3 December 1922; Christchurch, New Zealand
- Died: 20 May 2012 (aged 89); Christchurch, New Zealand
- Batting: Right-handed
- Role: Wicket-keeper

Domestic team information
- Years: Team
- 1945-46 to 1952-53: Canterbury

Career statistics
Competition	First-class
Matches	18
Runs scored	331
Batting average	15.76
100s/50s	0/0
Top score	46
Catches/stumpings	28/12
- Source: Cricinfo, 11 January 2021

Alan Edward Law Britton (3 December 1922 – 20 May 2012) was a New Zealand cricketer. He played in eighteen first-class matches for Canterbury from 1945 to 1953.

== Life and career ==
Britton was born in Christchurch and attended Christchurch Boys' High School. He served in the Royal New Zealand Air Force in World War II. He continued to serve in the Territorial Air Force until 1977, when he retired with the rank of squadron leader.

He played as a wicket-keeper and useful lower-order batsman for Canterbury for five seasons. He was their keeper when they won the Plunket Shield in his first season, 1945–46, and again when they won in 1951–52.

Britton was a schoolteacher. He was the founding principal of Hornby High School in Christchurch in 1975.
