= Donald Nicholson (biochemist) =

British scientist

Donald Elliot Nicholson (1916 – 2012) was a British scientist, best known for devising the charts of Biochemical cycles which have become a commonplace in the offices of clinical and bioscience staff worldwide.

== Education and career ==
The son of a Methodist minister, Nicholson was born in Leek, Staffordshire. He had two brothers, including a twin, Kenneth. He attended Kingswood School in Bath prior to obtaining a degree in colour chemistry from Huddersfield Technical College in 1936. He worked as a researcher with fluorine compounds at his alma mater prior to earning his PhD through the University of London in 1940 or 1941. During World War II, he was involved in the production of sulfanilamide. He became a research fellow at Leeds School of Medicine after the war, working with tubercle bacillus and diphtheria toxins. Thereafter, he assumed a career role as a Lecturer at that school in 1950, becoming a Senior Lecturer in 1964.

== The Metabolic Pathways Chart ==
The subject of bacterial metabolism was a challenging one for students in the 1950s, as the field had been rapidly expanding since the mapping of the first metabolic pathway in 1940. Nicholson had himself struggled in school and was sympathetic to challenged students. He decided to create a chart that would allow students to better understand the connections in body metabolism. His first chart, completed in 1955, was printed by the architect's department at Leeds. The high demand among students led him in 1960 to a small biochemical firm who agreed to a higher print run, using colour to distinguish the different pathways. He was much heartened when he went to Oxford for a lecture by the Nobel Prizewinner Professor Hans Krebs and Krebs began the lecture by displaying a Nicholson chart.

The chart had as of 2012 been published in over a million copies in 22 editions, including updates by Nicholson to incorporate new findings over the years. It has also been reproduced in many textbooks. Nicholson also created an "Inborn Errors of Metabolism" map for medical students, who felt the Nicholson Chart too focused on biochemistry for clinical medicine. Due to his wife's phobia of electrical devices, Nicholson did not digitise his maps until he bought his first computer after her death in 1996. He donated the copyright of his work to the International Union of Biochemistry and Molecular Biology. However, he continued working on his charts for the rest of his life; at the time of his death, he was working on a version using Flash Animation.

== Private life ==
Nicholson and his wife Celia had three children. In addition to his career in science, he served as a Methodist lay preacher for many years, from 1939. He also served as a prison visitor.

== Honors ==
The University of Huddersfield awarded Nicholson an Honorary D.Sc. The International Union of Biochemistry and Molecular Biology appointed him a Special Life Members, one of only two at the time of his death in 2012.
