= Otis Clark =

American butler

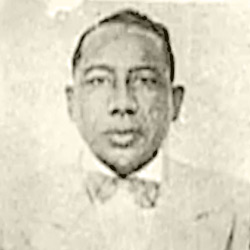
- Oklahoma archival photo
- Born: February 13, 1903; Meridian, Indian Territory
- Died: May 21, 2012 (aged 109 years, 98 days); Federal Way, Washington
- Other names: "Dad" Clark, World's Oldest Traveling Preacher
- Occupation: Preacher
- Known for: Butler for: Clark Gable, Charlie Chaplin, Joan Crawford
- Movement: Tulsa race massacre
- Website: www.lifeenrichmentinc.com

Otis Clark (February 13, 1903 – May 21, 2012) was an American butler who was one of the last survivors of the May 31, 1921, Tulsa race massacre, considered to be the worst racial massacre in American history. He had worked for movie stars such as Clark Gable, Charlie Chaplin, and Joan Crawford. Clark's wife lived at the Crawford residence working as the cook for Joan Crawford.

== Early life ==
Born in 1903, Clark grew up in a segregated Tulsa, Oklahoma as a drugstore delivery boy. He was raised in the Greenwood side of town (which was black) and could not enter stores in the predominantly-white downtown area.

In the late afternoon on May 30, 1921, a black teenager, Dick Rowland, used the elevator in the Drexel building in downtown Tulsa. As Rowland exited the elevator, an employee of Renberg's clothing store heard what was thought to be a scream. The clerk reached the conclusion that Sarah Page, the white elevator operator, had been assaulted. Newspaper headlines supported the account, causing a race riot to occur in Tulsa on May 31, 1921.

=== Tulsa race massacre ===
Clark was 18 years old when the Tulsa massacre occurred and saw many people die. Clark remembered trying to get a car to help victims of the massacre when gunfire came his way. Clark ran for his life while people were shooting at him. His family home was burned to the ground and he believed his stepfather was killed during the massacre, as he was never seen again. During the 18-hour siege white people destroyed 30 blocks of a thriving African-American residential and business community known as the "Black Wall Street," leaving 38 known dead and 200+ missing (a figure estimated by the American Red Cross) and 10,000 homeless.

Shortly thereafter, at age 19, Clark fled Tulsa on a train bound for California to look for his biological father. He survived 20 days in a California jail for bootlegging and selling illegal whiskey. He wound up getting married and finding employment in Hollywood as a butler. Based on a spiritual dream to become a preacher doing the work of God, Clark later became an itinerant evangelist traveling the United States and the world on behalf of the Church of God In Christ. Officially ordained as a minister in 1946, Clark was the oldest living practising evangelist at age 109, and remained in good health until his death.

A documentary was later made entitled Before They Die telling the story of Clark and the massacre as they occurred in 1921.

At 109 years old, 'Dad' Clark (as he was called) was the oldest living survivor of the 1921 Tulsa massacre at the time of his death.

== Health and death ==
Clark was 109 when he died in Seattle.

Clark was noted to have been in excellent health, up until his death, having not used medication, hearing aid, or cane when walking. Clark was also noted to have been active, having traveled to Zimbabwe for a three-week mission trip when he was 104, and visiting Canada in January 2012. Clark was reportedly preparing for a mission trip to Nigeria in 2013.
