= Desmond Fernando =

Sri Lankan doctor and inventor

Bothalage Desmond James Stanley Fernando
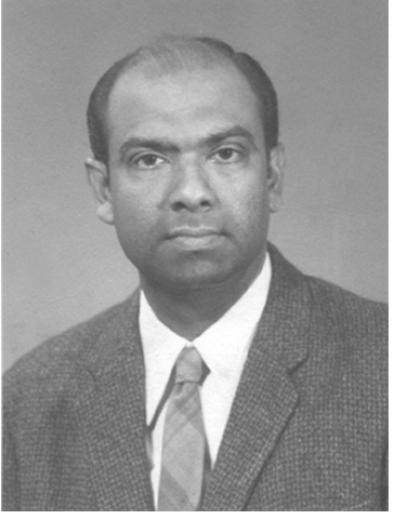
- Born: 26 November 1930; Colombo, Sri Lanka
- Died: 31 May 2012 (aged 81); Ratmalana, Mount Lavinia Sri Lanka
- Occupations: President College of General Practitioners of Sri Lanka, General Practitioner and Inventor
- Known for: Contributions to developing General Practice as a speciality in Sri Lanka, Inventing and Introducing low cost health care technology to Sri Lanka
- Title: Doctor
- Spouse: Sumana Fernando

Dr Bothalage Desmond James Stanley Fernando (BDJS Fernando) (1930–2012) was a Sri Lankan doctor and inventor, best known for his services to General Practice in the country.

== Education ==
=== School ===
Fernando was educated at S.Thomas' Preparatory school Kollupitiya and S.Thomas' College Mt Lavinia. He is known among his classmates for demonstrating a process for manufacturing small amounts of plastic and nylon at the College Science exhibition in 1945 and was awarded prizes for academic excellence. He was a junior librarian and a member of the photographic society.

=== Undergraduate ===
Fernando entered the Ceylon Medical College (later Faculty of Medicine, University of Colombo) in 1947 winning the University Scholarship. He served on the committee of the medical students union and qualified MBBS in 1954.

=== Postgraduate training ===
Fernando trained as a paediatrician in Children's Hospital Medical Centre Boston Mass USA with Charles Alderson Janeway and at Beverley Hospital with Professor William Dorsey. He later retrained in Family Medicine in Beverly Mass USA becoming a Member of the American Academy of Family Physicians. He subsequently attended the Department of General Practice, University of Manchester UK initially with Professor Patrick Byrne and later with Professor David HH Metcalfe, University of Nottingham UK with Dr Michael Varnum and St Georges Hospital Medical School London UK with Professor Paul Freeling on a British Council Fellowship.

== Professional activity ==
Fernando was appointed District Medical Officer Elpitiya and later District Medical Officer Minuwangoda before resigning from government practice. He practiced as a family physician in Ratmalana for 51 years till his retirement in 2010. Although his American paediatric training was not credited by the Ministry of Health which recognised only British Qualifications, his patients recognised his dual accreditation as a paediatrician in addition to being their family physician. His patients credited him for his clinical acumen in making complex diagnoses such as the rib tip syndrome. Godfrey Senaratne comments on his dedication to keeping himself up to date through maintaining overseas standards at a time when continuing Professional development was not compulsory in Sri Lanka.

== Services to Family Medicine ==
Fernando contributed to establishing Family Medicine (General Practice) as a speciality in Sri Lanka jointly with colleagues Denis J Aloysius, GM Heennilame, MPM Cooray, BDJ Silva and Professor Leila Karunaratne and developing the training programme over two decades. A 2017 account published in the Sri Lankan Family Physician described Fernando as a founder member of the Board of Study in Family Medicine at the Postgraduate Institute of Medicine, where he served as course coordinator and examiner for postgraduate family-medicine examinations and helped establish the Faculty of Teachers of the College of General Practitioners of Sri Lanka.He taught Family Medicine at the Postgraduate Institute of Medicine at the University of Colombo where he was a founder member of the Board of Study in Family Medicine, taking a prominent role in writing the curriculum, setting up and chairing the examination board for the Diploma in Family Medicine and MD Family Medicine programs. With Dr J.B. Peiris (Chairman PGIM) and Dr Arul Raj (Chairman Commonwealth Medical Association) he extended this to centres in India, and served as coordinator and chief examiner. His presidential address with the title "The Place of Primary care in the Health Services Pyramid" outlined a blueprint for strategies to implement family medicine based primary care systems in Sri Lanka.

Fernando served on many international committees and in regional general practice organisations and delivered lectures in 1997 at Indian Medical Association Annual Scientific Sessions held in New Delhi, the WONCA Middle East South Asian Regional Conference in Nepal in 1996 (where interest in the DFM exam arose among the Indian representatives attending the conference following his presentation on 'Post Graduate Training in Family Medicine in Sri Lanka), the Indian Medical Association Annual Scientific Sessions held in Hyderabad in 1998, UK and USA. He was President of the College of General Practitioners of Sri Lanka for two terms, served on the Five Member Committee set up by the Ministry of Health to examine the need to set up an autonomous National Drug Control Authority, contributed to the national guide on vaccines and served on the national task force for eradication of rabies.

== Research and inventions ==
Fernando is credited by his younger sister Patricia as being proficient in inventing designing and repairing. He has been an innovator in introducing appropriate low-cost technology to medicine in Sri Lanka and is credited with developing a phonocardiogram (with Dr P. T. De Silva). He has also developed a device for screening for diabetic neuropathy manufactured entirely with locally available components. He is credited with introducing outpatient day case rubber band ligation of haemorrhoids in a general practice setting.

== Professional affiliations and honours ==
The College of General Practitioners of Sri Lanka awarded him the fellowship of the college and a lifetime service and achievement award. The council in their robes of office walked alongside the cortege to the Mt Lavinia cemetery. He was a Fellow of the American Academy of Family Physicians.

== Voluntary service ==
Fernando served in a voluntary capacity as the School doctor for his alma mater S Thomas'College Mt Lavinia from 1963 to 1983 treating both students and teachers.

== Personal ==
He was married to Sumana Fernando director and producer of documentary films and International coordinator for the Federation of university women member Sri Lanka Women's Conference, who serves on the board of The Virginia Gildersleeve International Fund. He was the father of Devaka Fernando, and a foster father figure to his nephews Salinda (DBS) de Silva, Sudath de Silva (CEO George Stuarts Finance) and his niece Sreeni Dalpatadu (Attorney at Law). He was the brother of Claribel de Silva and Patricia Fernando.
