= Peter D. Sieruta =

American writer and book critic

- Born: October 13, 1958
- Died: May 25, 2012 (aged 53); Farmington Hills, Michigan
- Occupations: Author, critic
- Writing career
- Genre: Children's Books

Peter D. Sieruta (October 13, 1958 – May 25, 2012) was an American writer and book critic. He was best known for his reviews for The Horn Book Magazine, his short story collection Heartbeats and Other Stories, and his blog, Collecting Children's Literature.

== Career ==
Sieruta first came to prominence due to the 1989 publication of Heartbeats and Other Stories, a collection of nine young adult stories, which attracted positive notice from School Library Journal and Publishers Weekly.

After this, however, Sieruta largely moved into criticism and reviewing. In the early 1990s, he was among the first reviewers for The Horn Book Guide, and was a regular contributor to The Horn Book Magazine from then until his death. As an avid collector of children's books, Sieruta also maintained a blog, Collecting Children's Books, beginning in 2007.

At the time of his death, Sieruta had largely completed the manuscript for another book, Wild Things!: Acts of Mischief in Children's Books, co-written with Betsy Bird and Julie Danielson. The book was published by Candlewick Press in 2014.

== Death ==
Sieruta died in 2012 from complications due to a fall he had suffered several days earlier.

=== Books ===
- Heartbeats and Other Stories (1989)
- Wild Things!: Acts of Mischief in Children's Literature (2014, with Betsy Bird and Julie Danielson)
