= Peter K. Cullins =

American naval admiral (1928-2012)

- Born: Peter Kendall Cullins; November 19, 1928; Annapolis, Maryland, U.S.
- Died: May 3, 2012 (aged 83); Camp Springs, Maryland, U.S.
- Military career
- Allegiance: United States
- Branch: United States Navy
- Service years: 1951–1981
- Rank: Rear Admiral
- Awards: Legion of Merit; Bronze Star

Peter Kendall Cullins (November 19, 1928 – May 3, 2012) was an American U.S. Navy admiral who commanded the USS Waddell and the USS Little Rock, a 1000-man guided missile cruiser and the flagship for Commander of the Sixth Fleet.

Cullins was born on November 19, 1928, in Annapolis, Maryland, he graduated from the U.S. Naval Academy with a bachelor of science degree in 1951. On January 1, 1977, he became the first commander of the Naval Data Automation Command. In March 1980, he became Commander South Atlantic Force. He retired as a Rear Admiral the following year.
