= James Doss =

American author

- Born: James D. Doss; 1939; Kentucky, U.S.
- Died: May 17, 2012 (aged 73); Los Alamos, New Mexico, U.S.
- Occupation: Author
- Writing career
- Genre: Mystery fiction

James D. Doss (1939 – 17 May 2012) was a noted American mystery novel author. He was the creator of the popular fictional Ute detective/rancher Charlie Moon, of whom he wrote 17 mystery novels. James "Danny" Doss was born and raised in Kentucky and died in Los Alamos, New Mexico. He was also an electrical engineer who worked on particle accelerators and biomedical technology for the University of California's Los Alamos National Laboratory, while writing his novels. After retirement from Los Alamos National Laboratory, he continued to write his popular novels while living in Taos, New Mexico and Los Alamos, New Mexico.

== Books ==
=== Charlie Moon Series ===
- 1. The Shaman Sings (1994)
- 2. The Shaman Laughs (1995)
- 3. The Shaman's Bones (1997)
- 4. The Shaman's Game (1998)
- 5. The Night Visitor (1999)
- 6. Grandmother Spider (2001)
- 7. White Shell Woman (2002)
- 8. Dead Soul (2003)
- 9. The Witch's Tongue (2004)
- 10. Shadow Man (2005)
- 11. Stone Butterfly (2006)
- 12. Three Sisters (2007)
- 13. Snake Dreams (2008)
- 14. The Widow's Revenge (2009)
- 15. A Dead Man's Tale (2010)
- 16. Coffin Man (2011)
- 17. The Old Gray Wolf (2012)
