= Jacqueline Ayer =

American fashion designer

- Born: May 2, 1930; New York City, U.S.
- Died: May 20, 2012 (aged 82); London, UK
- Education: The High School of Music & Art; Syracuse University; Académie de la Grande Chaumière; École Paul Colin; École des Beaux-Arts
- Known for: Author, illustrator, fashion designer
- Spouse: Frederic Lyman Ayer

Jacqueline Brandford Ayer (May 2, 1930 – May 20, 2012) was an American author, illustrator, fashion and textile designer, and recipient of a Gold Medal from the Society of Illustrators. She founded the fashion brand Design-Thai, worked in India producing textiles and wrote and illustrated children's books including Nu Dang and His Kite, A Wish for Little Sister and A Paper Flower Tree.

== Career ==
Jacqueline Ayer was born in New York City to Jamaican parents. Her father Edward Brandford was a graphic artist who founded The Brandford Modeling Agency, the first licensed African-American agency in the United States. Her mother, Thelma Brandford, was a sample cutter and shop steward for the ILGWU (International Ladies' Garment Workers' Union). Ayer grew up in the "Coops", an East Bronx cooperative built for garment workers. She went to the High School of Music & Art in New York and then Syracuse University, followed by the Académie de la Grande Chaumière (drawing), the École Paul Colin (graphics) and the École des Beaux-Arts (painting) in Paris.

While she was in France in the early 1950s, Ayer worked as a fashion illustrator, sketching the models as they walked down the runway at the Paris collections. From there she was introduced to Christian Dior and Michel de Brunhoff, the editor of Vogue Paris, who helped to support her and develop her work. In 1950, she was featured alongside Man Ray in the "Fantsastische Gebete" segment of the film Dadascope (released 1961) by Hans Richter. She played the black chess queen; Man Ray's muse (later wife) Juliet Browner played the white queen.

She moved back to New York in 1953 and began working for the department store Bonwit Teller as a fashion illustrator; among her colleagues there was the young Andy Warhol. She returned to Paris on holiday in 1956, where she met fellow American Frederic Ayer. They got married and traveled by boat and train across Asia, before renting a house in Bangkok, where their first daughter Margot was born. Their second daughter Elizabeth was born two-and-a-half years later.

Inspired by her surroundings in Thailand, Ayer began to work on a series of children's books based on her illustrations of day-to-day life in Bangkok. She was offered a publishing deal by Harcourt Brace in New York, and went on to publish eight children's books (four as author and illustrator, four as illustrator), including Nu Dang and His Kite, A Wish for Little Sister and A Paper Flower Tree.

In Bangkok Ayer met Jim Thompson, the founder of The Thai Silk Company, who had been approached by an executive working for Nelson Rockefeller's International Basic Economy Corporation about developing a business based on traditional Thai crafts. Jim Thompson suggested modernising traditional Thai patterns and printing them on his silks. On Thompson's recommendation, Ayer was hired as the designer for the new company, which she decided to name Design-Thai. The printed textiles, which included silks and cottons, were popular with both Europeans and Americans. Ayer designed both fabrics and clothing patterns. Design-Thai was able to expand, opening a large shop in Bangkok branching into ready-to-wear clothing. In 1966–67, Design-Thai had over 400 employees and, during Ayer's tenure, its wares were sold by shops including Harrods.

In the 1970s Ayer worked for the Indian government, helping to develop traditional crafts and cottage industries across the country. She also had a stint in New York designing bed linen, which was sold in top department stores including Bloomingdale's and Neiman Marcus. But she was mainly based in London, where she designed soft furnishings for brands including The Conran Shop and Ralph Lauren, as well as publishing a book on the history of Oriental costumes. In later life, Ayer continued to draw and paint, and many of her final works were large-scale watercolours featuring flowers and her personal belongings.

The Paper-Flower Tree and Nu Dang and His Kite were republished in June and July respectively in 2017 by New York-based publishers Enchanted Lion Books, in conjunction with an exhibition on Jacqueline Ayer's illustration and fashion design at The House of Illustration in London, June 17 to October 22, 2017.

== Publications ==
=== Children's books ===
Author and illustrator

- Nu Dang and His Kite, Harcourt, Brace and Company 1959, Collins, St. James's Place, London 1963
- A Wish for Little Sister, Harcourt, Brace and Company 1960, Collins, St. James's Place, London, 1963
- The Paper Flower Tree, Harcourt, Brace & World, Inc., 1962, Collins, St. James's Place, London, 1963
- Little Silk, Harcourt, Brace Jovanovich, Inc., 1970

Illustrator

- Humpy, by P. Yershov, Harcourt, Brace & World, Inc., 1966
- Rumpelstiltskin, by the Brothers Grimm and Jacqueline Ayer, Harcourt, Brace & World, Inc.,1967, Collins, St. James's Place, London 1968
- Princess September, by W. Somerset Maugham, Harcourt, Brace & World, Inc., 1969
- The Lost Umbrella of Kim Chu, by Eleanor Estes, Atheneum, New York, 1978

=== Adults' books ===
Author and illustrator

- Oriental Costumes, Atheneum, Macmillan Publishers Ltd, London 1974
