= Suggestopedia =

Teaching method used to learn foreign languages

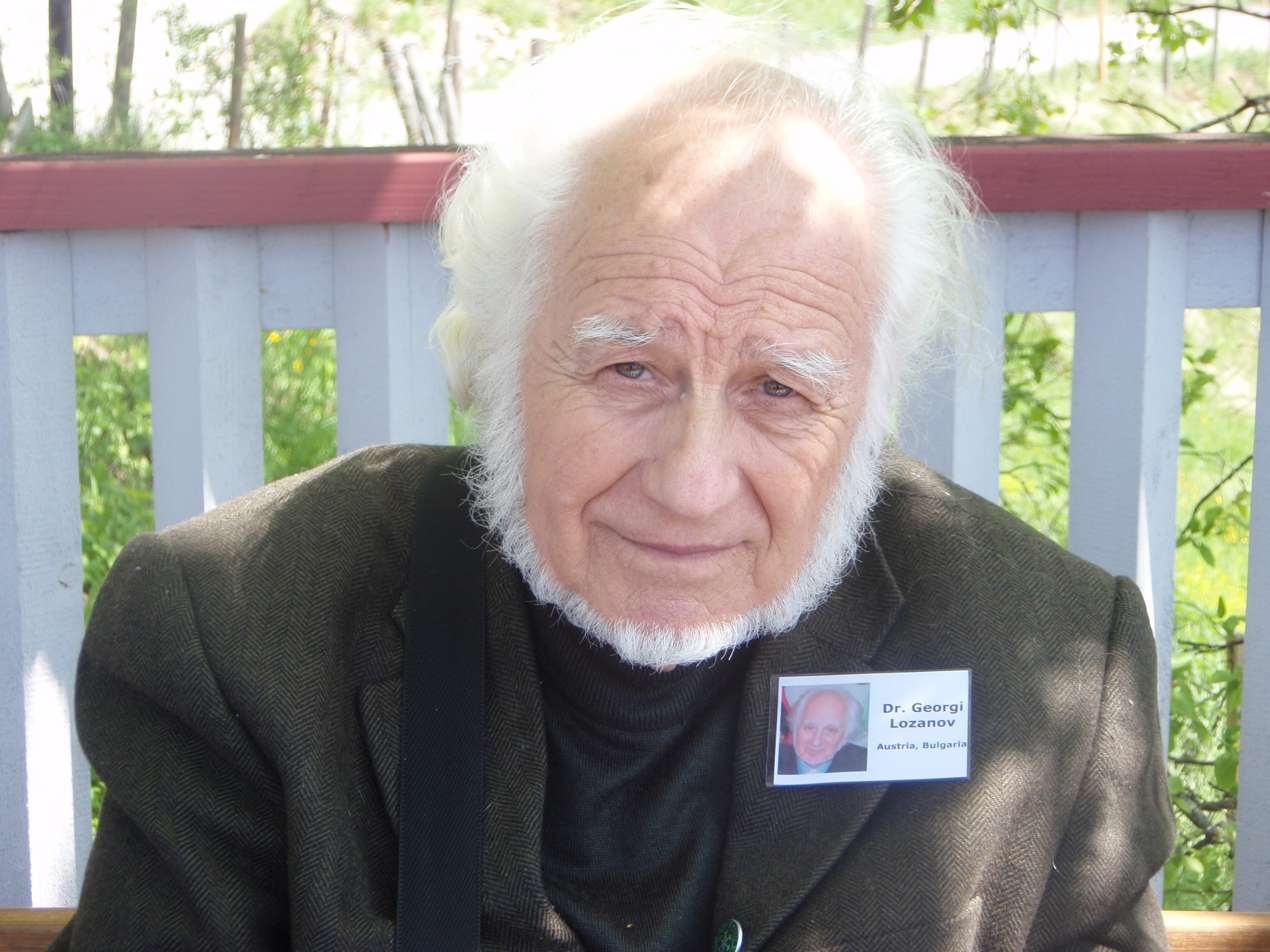
Bulgarian psychiatrist Georgi Lozanov who developed suggestopedia

Suggestopedia, a portmanteau of "suggestion" and "pedagogy" is a teaching method used to learn foreign languages developed by the Bulgarian psychiatrist Georgi Lozanov. It is also known as desuggestopedia.

First developed in the 1970s, suggestopedia utilised positive suggestions in teaching language. In 1978, Lozanov presented the method to a commission in Paris at UNESCO. Two years later in 1980, UNESCO issued their final report with various mixed views on the theory. On the one hand, it affirmed suggestopedia as a language learning technique for second-language speakers, but the report also included various criticisms of the theory.

== Practice ==
Suggestopedia asserts that the physical surroundings and atmosphere of classroom are vital factors in making sure that "students feel comfortable and confident". It also promotes various techniques, including art and music, in teaching languages. The pedagogy of suggestopedia consists of three phases: deciphering, concert session, and elaboration.

Deciphering: In the deciphering phase, a teacher introduces to their students some written or spoken content. In most materials the foreign-language text is on the left half of the page with a translation on the right half.

Concert session: The concert session phase consists of active and passive sessions. In the active session, the teacher reads the text at a normal speed, while their students follow. In the passive session, the students relax and listen to the teacher reading the text. Baroque music is played in the background.

Elaboration: The students express what they have learned through acting, songs, and games.

A fourth phase, production, is also sometimes used.

Production: The students spontaneously speak and interact in the target language without interruption or correction.

== Suggestopedia teachers ==
Suggestopedia asserts that teachers should not act in a directive way. For example, teachers should act as partners to their students, participating in activities such as games and songs "naturally" and "genuinely". Lozanov asserts that teachers should be versed in the "communication in the spirit of love, respect for man as a human being, the specific humanitarian way of applying their 'techniques' ".

== Suggestopedia for children ==
The suggestopedia pedagogy for adult learners includes long sessions without movement, and other techniques that Lozanov claims are effective for adults. Lozanov asserts that children have brains that are more delicate than those of adults, and another approach should be applied to children. Suggestopedia lessons for children are shorter in order to keep children away from the negative pedagogical suggestions of society.

== Claims ==
Its proponents claim that suggestopedia imparts better health and intellectual abilities onto its learners. Lozanov claims that the effect of suggestopedia is in not only language learning but also producing favourable side effects on health, the social and psychological relations, and the subsequent success in other subjects.

== Criticism ==
Suggestopedia has been called a "pseudo-science". In response, Lozanov claimed that suggestopedia cannot be compared to a placebo as he regarded placebos as being effective. Another point of criticism is brought forward by Baur, who claims that in suggestopedia students only receive input by listening, reading and musical-emotional backing, while other important factors of language acquisition are being neglected. Several other features of the method – like the 'nonconscious' acquisition of language, or bringing the learner into a childlike state – are questioned by critics. Lukesch also claims that suggestopedia lacks scientific backing and is criticized by psychologists as being based on pseudoscience.

== Later variations ==
Suggestopedia yielded four main offshoots. The first – still called Suggestopedia, and developed in eastern Europe – used different techniques from Lozanov's original version. The other three are named Superlearning, Suggestive Accelerated Learning and Teaching (SALT), and Psychopädie. Superlearning and SALT originated in North America, while Psychopädie was developed in West Germany. While all four are slightly different from the original suggestopedia and from each other, they still share the common traits of music, relaxation, and suggestion.
