= Dick Everitt =

English footballer

Personal information
- Full name: Richard Ewart Everitt
- Date of birth: 3 May 1922
- Place of birth: Carlisle, England
- Date of death: 18 May 2012 (aged 90)
- Place of death: Rotherham, England
- Position: Forward

Senior career*
Years	Team	Apps	(Gls)
	Sheffield Wednesday	0	(0)
1945–1947	Darlington	1	(0)
1947–1949	Worksop Town		
1949–1953	King's Lynn		
- March Town United
- Long Sutton Town

Managerial career
- Long Sutton Town (player-manager)
- * Club domestic league appearances and goals

Richard Ewart Everitt (3 May 1922 – 18 May 2012) was an English amateur footballer who played in the Football League for Darlington.

== Life and career ==
Everitt was born in Carlisle, which was then in Cumberland. He was on the books of Sheffield Wednesday during the Second World War, making four first-team appearances in the wartime competitions, and moved on to Darlington during the 1944–45 season. He made his debut – which proved to be his only first-team appearance for Darlington and only appearance in the Football League – in the second match of the first post-war season, on 4 September 1946 against Lincoln City in the Football League Third Division North.

Unwilling to commit to full-time football, Everitt worked on the railways and played non-league football, in which he scored profusely. In just two seasons with Midland League club Worksop Town, he scored 140 goals. In four seasons with King's Lynn of the Eastern Counties League, he hit 154 goals in 185 matches. He then appeared for March Town United and as player-manager of Long Sutton Town. He also coached at Rampton Hospital.

Away from football, Everitt worked for the Eastern Electricity Board, and he and his wife, Florence, kept pubs. He died in Rotherham, South Yorkshire, in 2012 at the age of 90.
