= Georgi Lozanov =

Bulgarian scientist

Georgi Lozanov Георги Лозанов
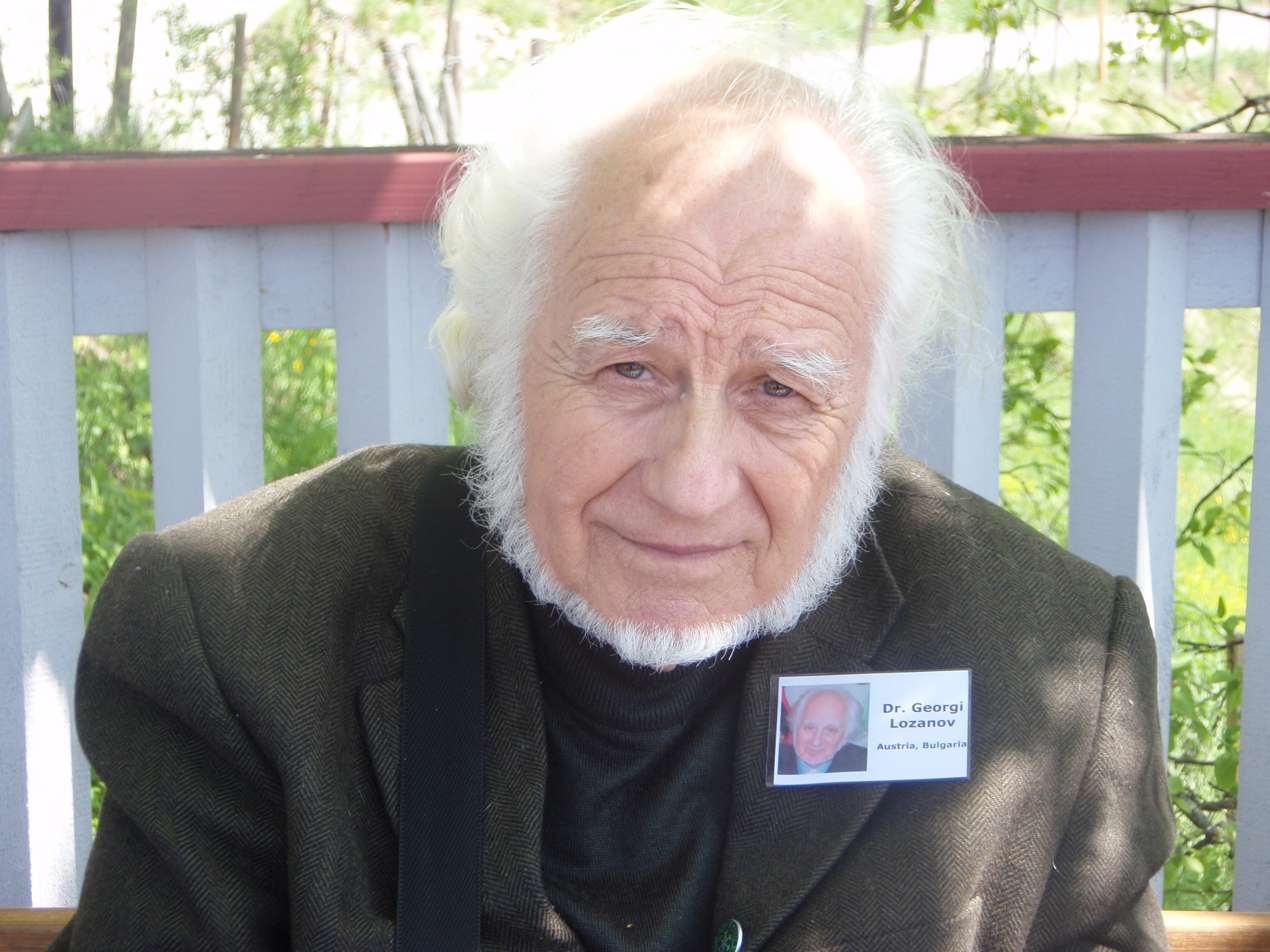
- Lozanov in Viktorsberg in 2008
- Born: 22 July 1926; Sofia, Bulgaria
- Died: 6 May 2012 (aged 85); Sliven, Bulgaria

Georgi Lozanov (Bulgarian: Георги Лозанов; 22 July 1926 – 6 May 2012), known as 'the father of accelerated learning', was a Bulgarian scientist, neurologist, psychiatrist, psychologist and educator, creator of suggestology, suggestopedia (or 'suggestopaedia', an experimental branch of suggestology for use in pedagogy), and integrated psychotherapy.

He developed suggestopedia, a learning/teaching theory based on his early-1960s study of suggestion which is known as "suggestology".

Lozanov's theory and practice triggered an accelerated learning movement in the West, where various techniques not originally included in Lozanov's theory were introduced. Such techniques included elements such as breathing, visualization, and biofeedback. There is a school in Sliven dedicated to preparing teachers for using suggestopaedia during lessons in order to improve the learning speed of pupils.

During the 1970s his theories and method were carefully analyzed and evaluated worldwide by a committee on languages learning and eventually certified by UNESCO as "the most cultural integral and effective learning method" in Second Language Acquisition, better known today as its corporate adaptation called the Accelerated Learning Method.

Among his research, Lozanov had conducted during his earlier career stages advanced long-term research in the field of parapsychology, especially on clairvoyance at the University of Sofia.

He eventually left Bulgaria, and settled in Western Europe creating and opening the International Centre for Desuggestology and Suggestopedia, Vienna, Austria, also referred to as the Lozanov Institute in Vienna, while conducting his extensive work in North America, particularly in Washington, D.C., USA, and Ottawa-Gatineau, Canada, working at its corresponding Diplomatic Institutes on the development and implementation of Accelerated Second Language Learning, training programs tailored to enhance the learning of diplomats, defense officers, and global federal government employees.

== Legacy ==
In 1966 he created the State Suggestology Research Institute in Sofia, Bulgaria, and the Centre for Suggestology and Development of Personality at the University of Sofia " St Climent Ohridski", which he directed until 1984.

During the 1970s he created the Lozanov learning method for super-learning of foreign languages, after the methodology audit of 1978 the method was certified by the Unesco in 1980. Upon certification of his method, he created the International Centre for Desuggestology and Suggestopedia in Vienna, Austria.

Then in 2005 with the contribution of his colleague, the linguist, pedagogue, and artist Dr. Evelyna Gateva, they created the Lozanov International Centre for Teacher Training in Vorarlberg, Austria that developed and provided teacher-training programs and certified new instructor and facilitators. During March 2006 at the Trainers' Conference in Sofia, it was created the International Association of Suggestology (Suggestopedia) founded with headquarters in Oslo, Norway; Dr. Lozanov was elected honorary chairman of the Association, and Professor Lisa Hartmark from Norway was elected chairwoman.

Also in 2006, on 26 March, he created the Lozanov International Trainers Association and they founded LITTA, the Lozanov Institute. There are hundreds of trained teachers at Litta website in many different countries, from 1991 to 2008. One, in particular, named Paulo Sergio Negrete, from Brazil, and trained in 2000, developed the Neuropedia / Deblocking Method, based on Suggestopedia, which claims to be a development of the method. The scientific paper was published in 2011.
