= 2018 in Canada =

- Decades: 1990s; 2000s; 2010s; 2020s
- See also: History of Canada; Timeline of Canadian history; List of years in Canada

Events from the year 2018 in Canada.

== Incumbents ==
=== The Crown ===
- Monarch – Elizabeth II

=== Federal government ===
- Governor General – Julie Payette
- Prime Minister – Justin Trudeau
- Parliament – 42nd

=== Provincial governments ===
==== Lieutenant governors ====
- Lieutenant Governor of Alberta – Lois Mitchell
- Lieutenant Governor of British Columbia – Judith Guichon (until April 24), then Janet Austin
- Lieutenant Governor of Manitoba – Janice Filmon
- Lieutenant Governor of New Brunswick – Jocelyne Roy-Vienneau
- Lieutenant Governor of Newfoundland and Labrador – Frank Fagan (until May 3), then Judy Foote
- Lieutenant Governor of Nova Scotia – Arthur LeBlanc
- Lieutenant Governor of Ontario – Elizabeth Dowdeswell
- Lieutenant Governor of Prince Edward Island – Antoinette Perry
- Lieutenant Governor of Quebec – J. Michel Doyon
- Lieutenant Governor of Saskatchewan – Vaughn Solomon Schofield (until March 21), then W. Thomas Molloy

==== Premiers ====
- Premier of Alberta – Rachel Notley
- Premier of British Columbia – John Horgan
- Premier of Manitoba – Brian Pallister
- Premier of New Brunswick – Brian Gallant (until November 9), then Blaine Higgs
- Premier of Newfoundland and Labrador – Dwight Ball
- Premier of Nova Scotia – Stephen McNeil
- Premier of Ontario – Kathleen Wynne (until June 29), then Doug Ford
- Premier of Prince Edward Island – Wade MacLauchlan
- Premier of Quebec – Philippe Couillard (until October 18), then François Legault
- Premier of Saskatchewan – Brad Wall (until February 2), then Scott Moe

=== Territorial governments ===
==== Commissioners ====
- Commissioner of Nunavut – Nellie Kusugak
- Commissioner of the Northwest Territories – Margaret Thom
- Commissioner of Yukon – Doug Phillips (until January 31), vacant (January 31 to March 12), then Angélique Bernard

==== Premiers ====
- Premier of Nunavut – Paul Quassa (until June 14), then Joe Savikataaq
- Premier of the Northwest Territories – Bob McLeod
- Premier of Yukon – Sandy Silver

== Events ==
=== January ===
- January 13 to 21 – 2018 Canadian Junior Curling Championships.
- January 21 – The New Democratic Party of Quebec leadership election resulted in Raphael Fortin being chosen as the new leader for the New Democratic Party of Quebec.
- January 27 – The Saskatchewan Party leadership election resulted in Scott Moe being chosen as the new leader for the Saskatchewan Party.

=== February ===
- February 3 – The British Columbia Liberal Party leadership election resulted in Andrew Wilkinson being chosen as the new leader of the British Columbia Liberal Party

=== March ===
- March 3 – The Saskatchewan New Democratic Party leadership election resulted in Ryan Meili being chosen as the new leader for the Saskatchewan New Democratic Party.
- March 5 – York University strike starts.
- March 10 – The Ontario Progressive Conservative Party leadership election resulted in Doug Ford being chosen as the new leader for the Progressive Conservative Party of Ontario.
- March 11 – Daylight saving time goes into effect.
- March 17–25 – 2018 Ford World Women's Curling Championship in North Bay.

=== April ===
- April 6 – 16 are killed in the Humboldt Broncos bus crash involving the team bus for the Humboldt Broncos, a junior hockey team in the Saskatchewan Junior Hockey League, and a semi-trailer truck.
- April 7 – The New Democratic Party of Prince Edward Island leadership election resulted in Joe Byrne being chosen as the new leader for the New Democratic Party of Prince Edward Island.
- April 23 – A van strikes a group of pedestrians in Toronto, killing ten and injuring at least 15. The driver then flees the scene but is later arrested, according to Toronto Police, who are still handling the investigation. Terrorist involvement has not been ruled out. (BBC) (Globe News) (The Guardian)
- April 29 – The Progressive Conservative Party of Newfoundland and Labrador leadership election resulted in Ches Crosbie being chosen as the new leader of the Progressive Conservative Party of Newfoundland and Labrador.

=== May ===
- May 11 – United Nations announces it is concerned Canada is not doing enough for Indigenous people's status.
- May 18 – A massive fire destroys several buildings in downtown Brandon, Manitoba.
- May 18 to 27 – 2018 Memorial Cup, was held at the Brandt Centre in Regina, Saskatchewan.

=== June ===
- June 4 – A teenage girl is sentenced to 40 months imprisonment after being convicted of the murder of Serena McKay in Sagkeeng First Nation, Lake Winnipeg. McKay had been severely beaten by two female classmates and then left to die of hypothermia. The attack was videoed and posted to social media.
- June 7 – In the Ontario general election, the Progressive Conservative Party of Ontario gain a majority, the NDP becoming the official opposition and Green Party leader Mike Schreiner won the first ever elected seat for that party in the Ontario parliament.
- June 8 and 9 – The 44th G7 summit is held in La Malbaie, Quebec, Canada.
- June 11 to 17 – 2018 FIBA Under-18 Americas Championship were held in St. Catharines, Ontario.
- June 19 – The Parliament of Canada passes the final version of the Cannabis Act to legalize recreational use of cannabis. It will take effect on October 17.

=== July ===
- July 5 – The 2018 North American heat wave took place.
- July 18 – The 2018 Canadian cabinet reshuffle took place.
- July 22 – A gunman kills two people and injures thirteen others in a shooting rampage in Toronto, Ontario.

=== August ===
- August 6 – Saudi Arabia withdraws its Ambassador from Canada and orders the expulsion of the Canadian Ambassador, in response to Canadian criticism of its poor human rights record.
- August 10 – Four people are killed in a mass shooting in Fredericton.

=== September ===
- September 18 – Quebec holds its first ever English language debates during the 2018 Quebec general election with the leaders of Coalition Avenir Québec (CAQ), Parti Québécois (PQ), Québec solidaire and the Quebec Liberal Party.
- September 20–22 – 2018 CS Autumn Classic International in Oakville.
- September 24 – New Brunswick general election, Blaine Higgs and the Progressive Conservatives win the most seats, but not a majority. Premier Brian Gallant and the Liberals continue in power as a minority government (though having one less seat then the PCs) at the invitation of the lieutenant governor.

=== October ===
- October 1 – Quebec general election, Francois Legault and the Coalition Avenir Québec win a majority of seats, easily defeating Premier Philippe Couillard and the Liberals, Jean-Francois Lisee and the Parti Québécois. The CAQ is the first political party since 1970 to win a Quebec provincial election, that was neither Liberal or PQ.
- October 2 – Donna Strickland, an associate professor at the University of Waterloo, shares the award for the Nobel Prize in Physics for the co-invention of chirped pulse amplification.
- October 13–20 – 2018 World Mixed Curling Championship in Kelowna.
- October 16 – Yukon municipal elections.
- October 20 – British Columbia municipal elections.
- October 22 – Ontario municipal elections.
- October 24 – Manitoba municipal elections.
- October 26–28 – 2018 Skate Canada International in Laval

=== November ===
- November 4 – Daylight saving time ends.
- November 5 – Prince Edward Island municipal elections.

=== December ===
- December 6–9 – 2018–19 Grand Prix of Figure Skating Final in Vancouver.
- December 30 – The import, sale, use, and manufacture of asbestos is prohibited nationwide.

== Deaths ==
- 5 January – Jacques Genest, physician and scientist (born 1919)
- 8 January – Donnelly Rhodes, actor (born 1937)
- 18 January – Nancy Richler, novelist (born 1957)
- 25 January – Tommy Banks, pianist and senator (born 1936)
- 31 January
  - Alf Humphreys, actor (born 1953)
  - Leah LaBelle singer (born 1986)
- 1 February – William Whitehead, writer (born 1931)
- 3 February – Bert Brown, senator (born 1938)
- 10 February – Sonia Taverner, ballet dancer (born 1936)
- 17 February – Dorothy Rungeling, pilot (born 1911)
- 22 February – Richard E. Taylor, physicist (born 1929)
- 23 February – James Laxer, historian (born 1941)
- 1 March – Alexander Buchanan, hip hop artist known by stage name Bender (born 1980)
- 2 March – Ronnie Prophet, country singer (born 1937)
- 4 March – Moe Racine, football player (born 1937)
- 12 March – Danièle Dorice, singer and teacher (born 1935)
- 15 March – Bev Desjarlais, politician (born 1955)
- 25 March – André Bourbeau, politician (born 1936)
- 27 March – James "Quick" Parker, football player (born 1958)
- 5 April – Cynthia Chalk, photographer (born 1913)
- 22 April – Keith Ashfield, politician (born 1952)
- 2 May – Bill Torrey, hockey executive (born 1934)
- 2 May – Gord Brown, politician (born 1960)
- 2 May – Paul Dick, politician (born 1940)
- 13 May – Margot Kidder, actress (born 1948)
- 19 May – Arvi Liimatainen, film and television producer
- 16 June – Josef Kates, engineer (born 1921)
- 28 June - Denis Akiyama, Japanese movie actor (born 1952)
- 30 June – Smoke Dawg, rapper, singer, and songwriter (born 1996)
- 15 July – Ray Emery, hockey player (born 1985)
- 18 July – Larry Robinson, football player (born 1942)
- 25 July – Bob Brady, football player (born 1930)
- 25 July – Sergio Marchionne, businessman (born 1952)
- 1 August – Rick Genest, artist known as Zombie Boy (born 1985)
- 8 August – Élise Paré-Tousignant, music administrator and pedagogue (born 1937)
- 19 August – Alastair Gillespie, politician (born 1922)
- 23 September – Eric Berntson, politician (born 1941)
- 14 October – Donald Stovel Macdonald, politician (born 1932)
- 3 November – Chris Bradshaw, politician (born 1944)
- 11 December - John Henry Jackson, football player and restaurateur (born 1938)

== See also ==
- 2018 in Canadian television
- List of Canadian films of 2018
