= 1935 in Canada =

- Decades: 1910s; 1920s; 1930s; 1940s; 1950s
- See also: History of Canada; Timeline of Canadian history; List of years in Canada

Events from the year 1935 in Canada.

== Incumbents ==
=== Crown ===
- Monarch – George V

=== Federal government ===
- Governor General – Vere Ponsonby, 9th Earl of Bessborough (until November 2) then John Buchan
- Prime Minister – Richard B. Bennett (until October 23) then William Lyon Mackenzie King
- Chief Justice – Lyman Poore Duff (British Columbia)
- Parliament – 17th (until 14 August)

=== Provincial governments ===
==== Lieutenant governors ====
- Lieutenant Governor of Alberta – William Legh Walsh
- Lieutenant Governor of British Columbia – John William Fordham Johnson
- Lieutenant Governor of Manitoba – William Johnston Tupper
- Lieutenant Governor of New Brunswick – Hugh Havelock McLean (until February 8) then Murray MacLaren
- Lieutenant Governor of Nova Scotia – Walter Harold Covert
- Lieutenant Governor of Ontario – Herbert Alexander Bruce
- Lieutenant Governor of Prince Edward Island – George Des Brisay de Blois
- Lieutenant Governor of Quebec – Esioff-Léon Patenaude
- Lieutenant Governor of Saskatchewan – Hugh Edwin Munroe

==== Premiers ====
- Premier of Alberta – Richard Gavin Reid (until September 3) then William Aberhart
- Premier of British Columbia – Duff Pattullo
- Premier of Manitoba – John Bracken
- Premier of New Brunswick – Leonard Tilley (until July 16) then Allison Dysart
- Premier of Nova Scotia – Angus Lewis Macdonald
- Premier of Ontario – Mitchell Hepburn
- Premier of Prince Edward Island – William J. P. MacMillan (until August 15) then Walter Lea
- Premier of Quebec – Louis-Alexandre Taschereau
- Premier of Saskatchewan – James Garfield Gardiner (until November 1) then William John Patterson

=== Territorial governments ===
==== Commissioners ====
- Controller of Yukon – George A. Jeckell
- Commissioner of Northwest Territories – Vacant (Roy A. Gibson acting)

== Events ==
=== January to June ===
- January 2 – Prime Minister R. B. Bennett outlines his programme
- February 11 – Goodwill, The Amity Group established
- March 11
  - Bank of Canada established
  - The Bank of Canada issues a $500 banknote with Sir John A. Macdonald's portrait and a $1,000 note with Sir Wilfrid Laurier's portrait
- May 6 – Silver Jubilee of George V's accession as King
- May 7 – David Dunlap Observatory opens
- May 25 – Cabot Monument unveiled, Montreal
- June 5 – The On-to-Ottawa Trek begins
- June 26 – "Regina Riot": Royal Canadian Mounted Police fire into unarmed crowd of unemployed marchers in Regina, Saskatchewan

=== July to December ===
- July 5 – Canadian Wheat Board established
- July 16 – Allison Dysart becomes premier of New Brunswick, replacing Leonard Tilley
- August 15 – Walter Lea becomes premier of Prince Edward Island for the second time, replacing William J. P. MacMillan
- August 22 – 1935 Alberta general election: William Aberhart's Social Credit Party (SoCreds) wins a majority, defeating Richard G. Reid's United Farmers of Alberta
- September 3 – Aberhart becomes premier of Alberta, replacing Reid
- October 14 – Federal election: Mackenzie King's Liberals win a majority, defeating Bennett's Conservatives
- October 3 – After the Italian invasion of Abyssinia, Canada refuses to support military intervention or sanctions
- October 23 – Mackenzie King becomes prime minister for the third time, replacing Bennett
- November 1
  - William Patterson becomes premier of Saskatchewan, replacing James Gardiner
  - The magnitude 6.2 Timiskaming earthquake shakes western Quebec

== Sport ==
- April 9 – The Montreal Maroons win their second and final Stanley Cup by defeating the Toronto Maple Leafs 3 games to 0. The deciding game was played at the Montreal Forum. This was the last time a non-Original Six team won the Stanley Cup until the Philadelphia Flyers won the 1974 Stanley Cup Finals.
- April 13 – The Manitoba Junior Hockey League's Winnipeg Monarchs win their first Memorial Cup by defeating the Northern Ontario Hockey Association's Sudbury Cub Wolves 2 games to 1. All game played at Shea's Amphitheatre in Winnipeg
- December 7 – The Winnipeg 'Pegs become the first western team to win the Grey Cup by defeating the Hamilton Tigers 18 to 12 in the 23rd Grey Cup played at Hamilton Amateur Athletic Association Grounds

== Births ==
=== January to June ===
- January 6 – Joseph Rotman, Canadian businessman and philanthropist (d. 2015)
- January 7 – Rey Pagtakhan, physician, professor, politician and Minister
- January 10 – Ronnie Hawkins, pioneering rock and roll musician (d. 2022)
- January 14 – Lucille Wheeler, alpine skier, Olympic bronze medalist and world champion
- January 17 – Jim Robson, sportscaster (d. 2026)
- January 18 – Albert Millaire, actor and theatre director (d. 2018)
- January 21 – Jack Tunney, professional wrestling promoter (d. 2004)
- January 29 – Christina McCall, political writer (d. 2005)
- February 9 – Ron Attwell, ice hockey player (d. 2017)
- February 14
  - Rob McConnell, jazz musician (d. 2010)
  - Howie Glover, ice hockey player (d. 2021)
- February 21 – Jean Pelletier, politician and Mayor of Quebec City (d. 2009)
- March 2 – Al Waxman, actor and director (d. 2001)
- March 15 – Mary Pratt, painter (d. 2018)
- March 24 – Mary Seeman, psychiatrist
- April 16 – Ray Frenette, 28th Premier of New Brunswick (d. 2018)
- April 22 – Rita Johnston, politician, Canada's first female premier and 29th Premier of British Columbia
- April 28 – Murray McBride, politician
- May 5 – Billy Two Rivers, wrestler (d. 2023)
- May 25 – W. P. Kinsella, novelist and short story writer (d. 2016)
- May 26 – Pat Carney, politician, minister and senator
- May 30 – Ruta Lee, actress
- June 2 – Carol Shields, author (d. 2003)
- June 28 – Bob Hobert, football player

=== July to December ===
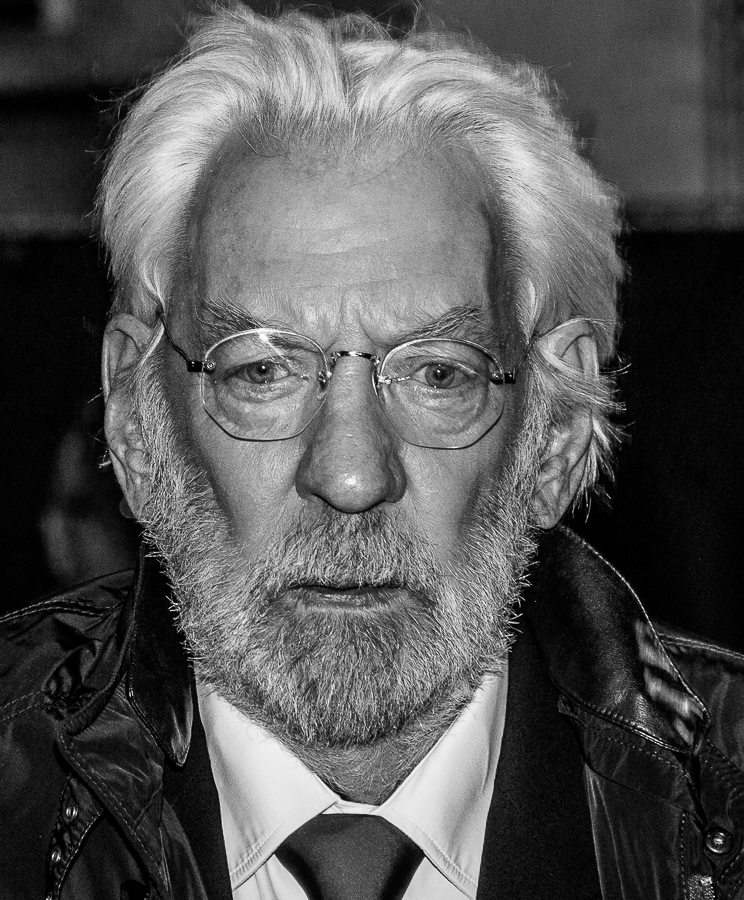
Donald Sutherland at the London premiere of The Hunger Games: Mockingjay – Part 1 in 2014

- July 3 – Bill Reichart, ice hockey player (d. 2021 in the United States)
- July 11 – Bobbie Sparrow, politician
- July 17 – Donald Sutherland, actor (d. 2024)
- July 23 – Danièle Dorice, singer and teacher (d. 2018)
- July 24 – Bob McAdorey, television and radio broadcaster (d. 2005)
- July 25 – Gilbert Parent, politician and 33rd Speaker of the Canadian House of Commons (d. 2009)
- July 27
  - Don Mazankowski, politician and Minister (d. 2020)
  - François Barbeau, costume designer (d. 2016)
- July 29 – Pat Lowther, poet (d. 1975)
- August 30 – Daniel L. Norris, Commissioner of the Northwest Territories (d. 2008)
- September 9 – Fred Stone, jazz musician (d. 1986)
- September 24 – Sean McCann, actor (d. 2019)
- September 27 – Al MacNeil, ice hockey player and coach (d. 2025)
- October 3 – Floyd Laughren, politician
- October 15 – Willie O'Ree, ice hockey player, first Black Canadian player in the National Hockey League
- October 20 – Russell Doern, politician (d. 1987)
- November 15 – Bill Graham, Canadian football player (d. 2020)
- November 17 – Audrey Thomas, novelist and short story writer
- December 9 – Christopher Pratt, painter and printmaker (d. 2022)
- December 11 – Elmer Vasko, ice hockey player (d. 1998)
- December 12 – John Wise, politician, MP for Elgin (1972–1988); Minister of Agriculture (1979–1980; 1984–1988) (d. 2013)
- December 13 – Raymond Speaker, politician
- December 21 – Edward Schreyer, politician, Premier of Manitoba and Governor General of Canada

=== Full date unknown ===
- James Bourque, First Nations activist (d. 1996)
- Lionel Giroux, midget wrestler (d. 1995)
- J. Robert Janes, author
- Alex Janvier, artist
- Louise Laurin, educator and activist (d. 2013)

== Deaths ==
- March 15 – James Duncan McGregor, agricultural pioneer, politician and Lieutenant-Governor of Manitoba (b. 1860)
- March 16 – John Macleod, physician, physiologist and Nobel laureate (b. 1876)
- April 10 – Charles-Émile Trudeau, entrepreneur and father of Pierre Trudeau, who would later become Prime Minister of Canada (b. 1887)
- April 19 – Willis Keith Baldwin, politician (b. 1857)
- July 18 – George Clift King, politician and 2nd Mayor of Calgary (b. 1848)
- September 30 – J. J. Kelso, journalist and social activist (b. 1864)
- October 24 – Edward Morris, 1st Baron Morris, politician and 2nd Prime Minister of Newfoundland (b. 1859)
- October 29 – Del Fontaine, Canadian middleweight boxing champion, executed for murder in the U.K.

== See also ==
- List of Canadian films
