= 1934 in Canada =

- Decades: 1910s; 1920s; 1930s; 1940s; 1950s
- See also: History of Canada; Timeline of Canadian history; List of years in Canada

Events from the year 1934 in Canada.

== Incumbents ==
=== Crown ===
- Monarch – George V

=== Federal government ===
- Governor General – Vere Ponsonby, 9th Earl of Bessborough
- Prime Minister – Richard Bedford Bennett
- Chief Justice – Lyman Poore Duff (British Columbia)
- Parliament – 17th

=== Provincial governments ===
==== Lieutenant governors ====
- Lieutenant Governor of Alberta – William Legh Walsh
- Lieutenant Governor of British Columbia – John William Fordham Johnson
- Lieutenant Governor of Manitoba – James Duncan McGregor (until December 1) then William Johnston Tupper
- Lieutenant Governor of New Brunswick – Hugh Havelock McLean
- Lieutenant Governor of Nova Scotia – Walter Harold Covert
- Lieutenant Governor of Ontario – Herbert Alexander Bruce
- Lieutenant Governor of Prince Edward Island – George Des Brisay de Blois
- Lieutenant Governor of Quebec – Henry George Carroll (until April 29) then Esioff-Léon Patenaude
- Lieutenant Governor of Saskatchewan – Hugh Edwin Munroe

==== Premiers ====
- Premier of Alberta – John Edward Brownlee (until July 10) then Richard Gavin Reid
- Premier of British Columbia – Duff Pattullo
- Premier of Manitoba – John Bracken
- Premier of New Brunswick – Leonard Tilley
- Premier of Nova Scotia – Angus Lewis Macdonald
- Premier of Ontario – George Stewart Henry (until July 10) then Mitchell Hepburn
- Premier of Prince Edward Island – William J. P. MacMillan
- Premier of Quebec – Louis-Alexandre Taschereau
- Premier of Saskatchewan – James Thomas Milton Anderson (until July 19) then James Garfield Gardiner

=== Territorial governments ===
==== Commissioners ====
- Controller of Yukon – George A. Jeckell
- Commissioner of Northwest Territories – Hugh Rowatt (until April 30) then Vacant (Roy A. Gibson acting)

== Events ==
- March 9 - New Brunswick women win the right to hold office
- June 19 - Ontario election: Mitchell Hepburn's Liberals win a majority, defeating George S. Henry's Conservatives
- June 19 - Saskatchewan election: James Garfield Gardiner's Liberals win a majority, defeating James T.M. Anderson's Conservative-led coalition government
- July 3 - The Bank of Canada is formed
- July 10 - Mitchell Hepburn becomes premier of Ontario, replacing George Henry
- July 10 - Richard G. Reid becomes premier of Alberta, replacing John Brownlee
- July 19 - James Gardiner becomes premier of Saskatchewan for the second time, replacing James Anderson
- August 14 - John Sackville Labatt kidnapped
- October 26 - Reconstruction Party of Canada formed

== Sport ==
- February 14 – The Ace Bailey Benefit Game (forerunner of the annual National Hockey League All-Star Game) is played at Maple Leaf Gardens in Toronto.
- April 5 – The Ontario Hockey Association's Toronto St. Michael's Majors win their first Memorial Cup by defeating the Edmonton Junior Hockey League's Edmonton Athletics 2 games to 0. All games were played at Shea's Amphitheatre in Winnipeg
- November 24 – The Sarnia Imperials win their first Grey Cup by defeating the Regina Roughriders 20 to 12 in the 22nd Grey Cup played at Toronto's Varsity Stadium

== Births ==
=== January to March ===
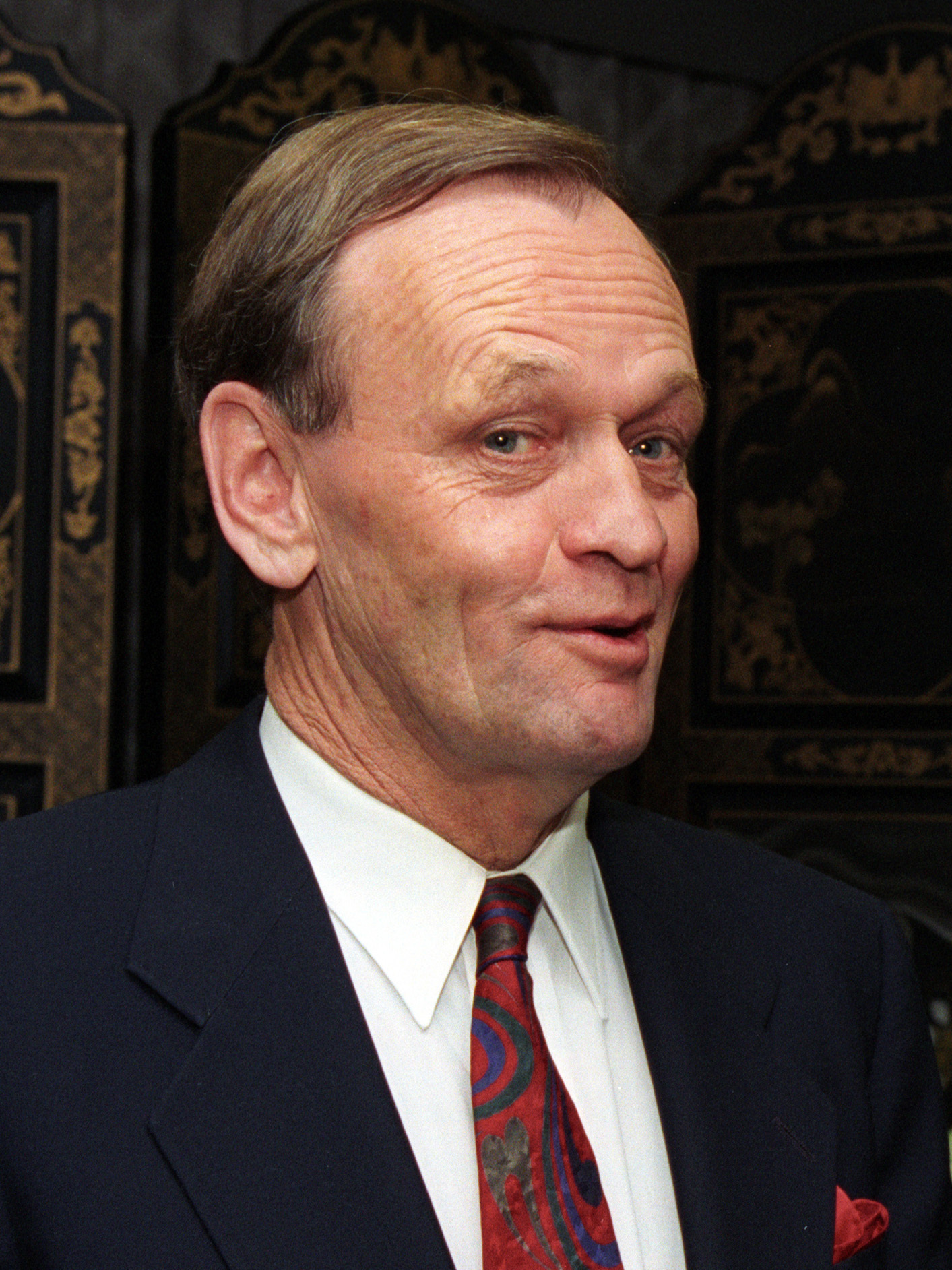
Jean Chrétien

- January 3 - Yves Gaucher, artist (d. 2000)
- January 7 - Jean Corbeil, politician (d. 2002)
- January 11 - Jean Chrétien, 20th Prime Minister of Canada
- January 16 - Judy Erola, broadcaster and politician
- January 19 - Lloyd Robertson, television news anchor and senior editor
- January 23 - Pierre Bourgault, politician and essayist (d. 2003)
- February 5 - Don Cherry, ice hockey player, coach and commentator
- February 8 - Philip Seeman, schizophrenia researcher and neuropharmacologist (d. 2021)
- February 22 - Victor M. Power, politician (d. 2024)
- February 24 - Murray Costello, ice hockey player and executive (d. 2024)
- March 7 - Douglas Cardinal, architect
- March 9 - Marlene Streit, golfer
- March 16 - Ray Hnatyshyn, politician and 24th Governor General of Canada (d. 2002)
- March 22 - George Stulac, basketball player and decathlete
- March 24 - Alice Whitty, high jumper (d. 2017)

=== April to June ===
- April 13 - John Muckler, ice hockey coach and executive (d. 2021)
- May 17 - George Karpati, neurologist and neuroscientist (d. 2009)
- May 28 - Dionne quintuplets, first quintuplets known to survive their infancy
- June 7 - David Strangway, Canadian geophysicist and academic (d. 2016)
- June 16 - Roger Neilson, ice hockey coach (d. 2003)
- June 22
  - Willie Adams, politician and senator
  - Nathan Nurgitz, lawyer, judge, and senator (d. 2019)
- June 24 - Jean-Pierre Ferland, singer/songwriter (d. 2024)
- June 27 - Norman Atkins, businessman and senator (d. 2010)
- June 30 - Aron Tager, Canadian actor (d. 2019)

=== July to September ===
- July 8 - Fred Stewart, Alberta politician
- July 12 - Mira Spivak, politician
- July 13 - Peter Gzowski, broadcaster, writer and reporter (d. 2002)
- July 16 - Albert Aguayo, neurologist
- July 19 - Larry Zolf, journalist (d. 2011)
- July 27 - Jim Elder, horse rider and Olympic gold medalist

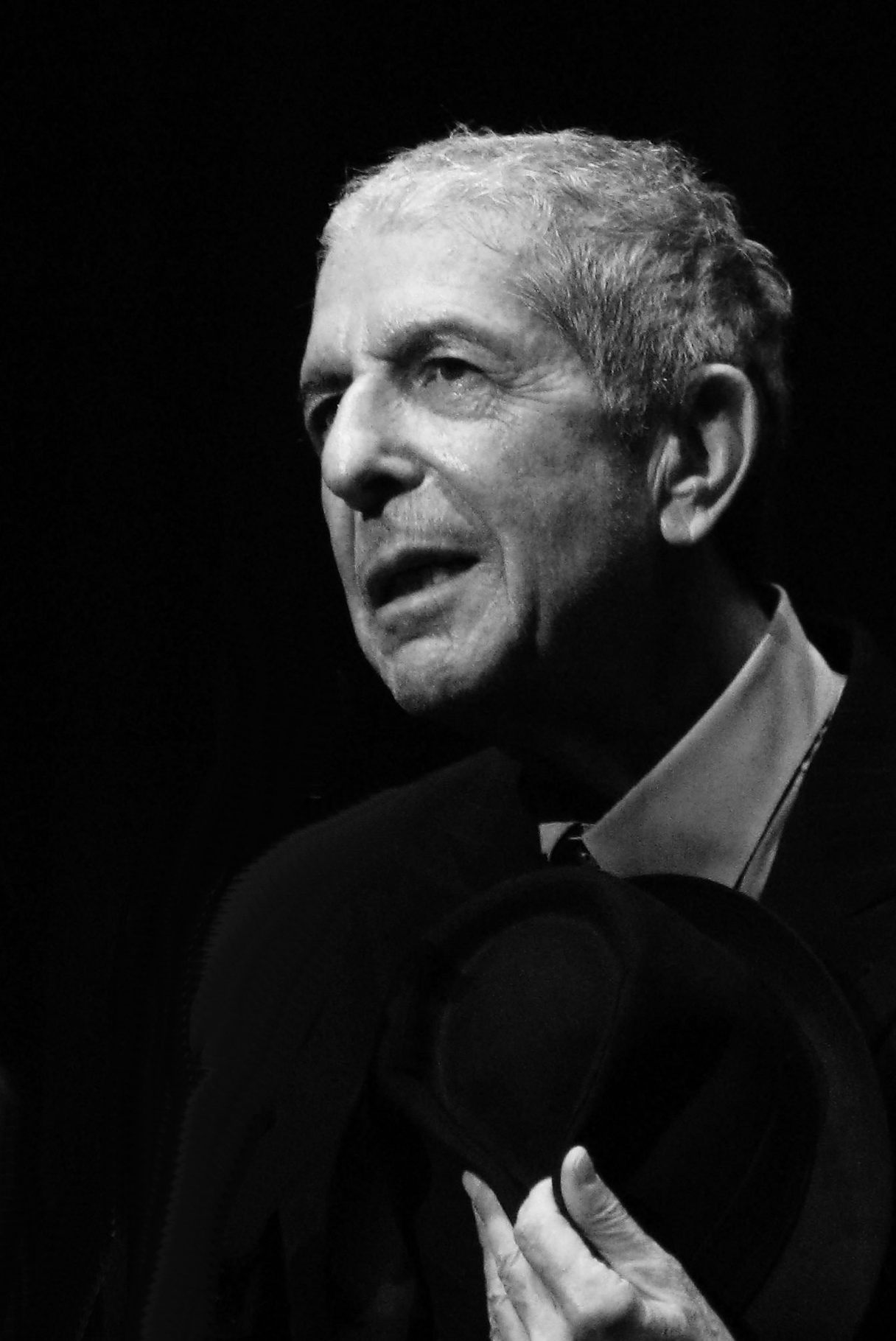
Leonard Cohen in 2008

- August 16 - Douglas Kirkland, Canadian-born American photographer (d. 2022 in the United States)
- August 22 - Ralph Mellanby, sportscaster and television producer (d. 2022)
- August 27 - Reggie Parks, wrestler and engraver (d. 2021)
- August 31 - Herb Epp, politician, MPP of the Ontario Legislature for Waterloo North (1977–1990) (d. 2013)
- September 2 - Donald B. Redford, archaeologist
- September 11 - Oliver Jones, jazz pianist, organist, composer and arranger
- September 21 - Leonard Cohen, singer-songwriter, musician, poet, novelist, and artist (d. 2016)
- September 25 - Ronald Lou-Poy, lawyer and community leader (d. 2022)

=== October to December ===
- October 1 - Margaret McCain, philanthropist and first female Lieutenant Governor of New Brunswick
- October 4 - Rudy Wiebe, author and professor
- October 5 - Kenneth D. Taylor, diplomat involved in the Iran hostage crisis (d. 2015)
- November 5 - Pierre Dufault, journalist and sports commentator (d. 2025)
- November 6 - Barton Myers, American/Canadian architect
- November 11 - Suzanne Lloyd, film and television actress
- November 21 - Howard Pawley, politician, professor and 18th Premier of Manitoba (d. 2015)
- November 26
  - Elie Martel, politician (d. 2025)
  - Conrad Santos, politician (d. 2016)
- November 30 - Marcel Prud'homme, politician and senator (d. 2017)
- December 11 - Mike Nykoluk, ice hockey player and coach (d. 2022)
- December 18 - Martin Lavut, filmmaker (d. 2016)
- December 25 - Peter Trueman, journalist and news presenter (d. 2021)

== Deaths ==
- March 7 - John Hamilton-Gordon, 1st Marquess of Aberdeen and Temair, Governor General of Canada (b. 1847)
- March 15 - Davidson Black, paleoanthropologist (b. 1884)
- April 17 - Frank S. Cahill, politician (b. 1876)
- July 28 - Marie Dressler, actress (b. 1868)
- September 1 – William Anderson Black, politician (b. 1847)
- October 4 - Henry Sproatt, architect (b. 1866)
- November 10 - Sir Donald Mann, railway contractor and entrepreneur (b. 1853)
