= Neil Seeman =

Canadian author, entrepreneur, academic, lawyer and mental health advocate

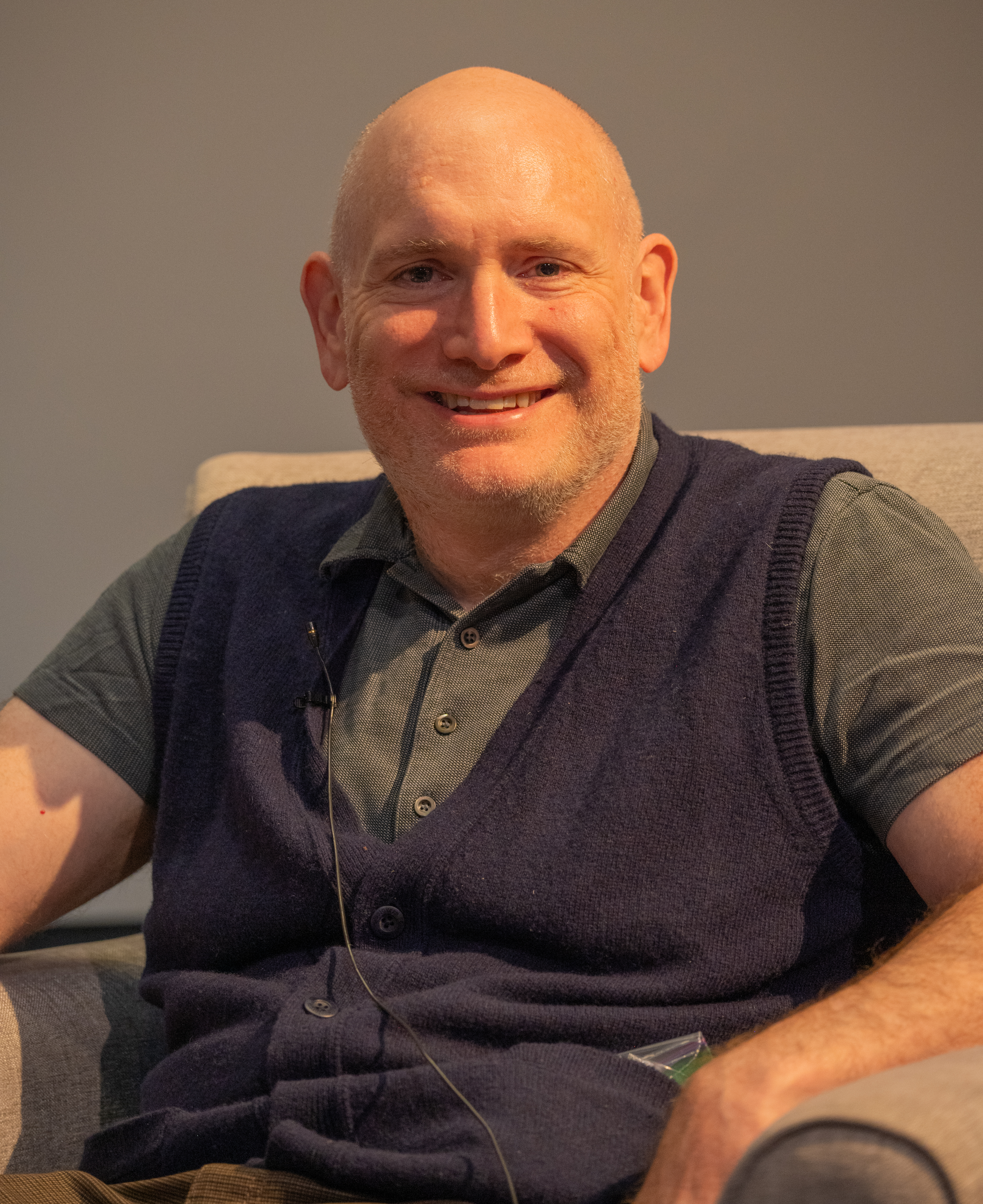
- Speaking at Upper Canada College, June 2023
- Born: Toronto, Canada, 1970
- Education: Queen's University at Kingston (BA), University of Toronto (JD), Harvard University (MPH)
- Spouse: Sarit Goldman-Seeman
- Children: 2
- Parent(s): Philip Seeman, Mary V. Seeman

Neil Seeman is a Canadian author on mental health and health policy topics, book publisher, and Internet entrepreneur. His books and essays seek to describe mental health stigma in business and society as seen through his experiences as an entrepreneur and public health researcher.

== Education ==
Neil Seeman attended Upper Canada College from 1984 to 1988. He obtained a BA (Hons.) from Queen's University in 1992, a JD from the University of Toronto Faculty of Law in 1995, and a Master's of Public Health from Harvard University in 1998.

== Early career ==
Seeman began his career as a public policy analyst and legal advocate. He served as an Adjunct Research Fellow at the Fraser Institute, where his research focused on judicial policy, crime prevention, and public health issues. During this period, he also worked as in-house counsel to the National Citizens Coalition.

Seeman served as an associate editor of National Review Online and contributed to Policy Options, where he wrote on Canadian conservative intellectual movements and political theory.

== Later career ==
=== Work in media and health policy ===
In 1998, Seeman was a founding member of the editorial board of the National Post newspaper. Seeman is a columnist for Healthcare Quarterly and the Toronto Star, where he writes on health policy, innovation, and public health issues. In 2006, he co-founded the Health Strategy Innovation Cell at Massey College in the University of Toronto. Seeman is the co-author of Psyche in the Lab: Celebrating Brain Science in Canada (Hogrefe & Huber). He is the co-author of XXL: Obesity and the Limits of Shame (University of Toronto Press) which was a shortlist finalist for the Donner Prize in 2011. The authors' concept of "healthy living vouchers" in XXL was criticized for being impractical and too reliant on state intervention to be effective as a policy tool to curtail the obesity epidemic.

=== Work in entrepreneurship and entrepreneurial mental health ===
In 2007, Seeman applied for a patent to use mistyped website names for polling, with the patent secured in 2011. This led Seeman to found the Big Data firm RIWI. He was CEO of RIWI, which in 2020 went public on the TSX Venture Exchange, until September, 2021. In May 2023, he published Accelerated Minds: Unlocking the Fascinating, Inspiring, and Often Destructive Impulses that Drive the Entrepreneurial Brain. Accelerated Minds was released in Japan in June 2025 under the title Entrepreneurship Addiction by Toyo Keizai. In November 2023, he co-founded Sutherland House Experts, for which he is Publisher.

=== Research involvement in mental health and health policy ===
Seeman was appointed a Fields Institute Fellow in 2022 by the Fields Institute for Research in Mathematical Sciences. He is a Senior Fellow of Massey College and a Senior Fellow and associate professor in the Institute for Health Policy, Management and Evaluation at the University of Toronto. He serves as Senior Academic Advisor to the Investigative Journalism Bureau at the Dalla Lana School of Public Health, and as knowledge translation lead to the Health Informatics, Visualization, and Equity (HIVE) Lab at the University of Toronto. Seeman was awarded the 2025 Lifetime Mental Health Advocacy Award by the Reach Out Together Foundation.

== Personal life ==
Seeman is the son of dopamine scientist Philip Seeman and women's mental health researcher Mary V. Seeman. He is married to Sarit Goldman-Seeman and has two children.
