= 1936 in Canada =

- Decades: 1910s; 1920s; 1930s; 1940s; 1950s
- See also: History of Canada; Timeline of Canadian history; List of years in Canada

Events from the year 1936 in Canada.

== Incumbents ==
=== Crown ===
- Monarch – George V (until January 20), then Edward VIII (January 20 to December 11), then George VI

=== Federal government ===
- Governor General – John Buchan
- Prime Minister – William Lyon Mackenzie King
- Chief Justice – Lyman Poore Duff (British Columbia)
- Parliament – 18th (from 6 February)

=== Provincial governments ===
==== Lieutenant governors ====
- Lieutenant Governor of Alberta – William Legh Walsh (until October 1) then Philip Primrose
- Lieutenant Governor of British Columbia – John W.F. Johnson (until May 1) then Eric Hamber
- Lieutenant Governor of Manitoba – William Johnston Tupper
- Lieutenant Governor of New Brunswick – Murray MacLaren
- Lieutenant Governor of Nova Scotia – Walter Harold Covert
- Lieutenant Governor of Ontario – Herbert Alexander Bruce
- Lieutenant Governor of Prince Edward Island – George Des Brisay de Blois
- Lieutenant Governor of Quebec – Esioff-Léon Patenaude
- Lieutenant Governor of Saskatchewan – Hugh Edwin Munroe (until September 10) then Archibald Peter McNab

==== Premiers ====
- Premier of Alberta – William Aberhart
- Premier of British Columbia – Thomas Dufferin Pattullo
- Premier of Manitoba – John Bracken
- Premier of New Brunswick – Allison Dysart
- Premier of Nova Scotia – Angus Lewis Macdonald
- Premier of Ontario – Mitchell Hepburn
- Premier of Prince Edward Island – Walter Lea (until January 10) then Thane Campbell (from January 14)
- Premier of Quebec – Louis-Alexandre Taschereau (until June 11) then Adélard Godbout (June 11 to August 26) then Maurice Duplessis
- Premier of Saskatchewan – William John Patterson

=== Territorial governments ===
==== Commissioners ====
- Controller of Yukon – George A. Jeckell
- Commissioner of Northwest Territories – Vacant (Roy A. Gibson acting) (until December 3) then Charles Camsell

== Events ==
- January 6 – Barbara Hanley is elected mayor of Webbwood, Ontario, becoming the first female mayor in Canada
- January 14 – Thane Campbell becomes premier of Prince Edward Island, replacing Walter Lea
- January 20 – King George V dies and is succeeded by his son Edward, Prince of Wales, as King Edward VIII
- March 20 – Heavy rains cause an ice dam on the Fredericton Railway Bridge in New Brunswick, inundating the city and carrying away the bridge.
- April 12 – The Moose River Gold Mines collapse in Nova Scotia
- June 11 – Adélard Godbout becomes premier of Quebec, replacing Louis-Alexandre Taschereau
- August 26 – Maurice Duplessis becomes premier of Quebec, replacing Adélard Godbout
- September – Earl Bascom of Raymond, Alberta, designs and directs the construction of the first rodeo arena and grandstands in the state of Mississippi
- November 2 – The Canadian Broadcasting Corporation replaces the Canadian Radio Broadcasting Commission
- November 18 – The Toronto Globe and the Mail and Empire merge to form The Globe and Mail
- December 11 – The British Parliament, with the consent of the Canadian government, passes His Majesty's Declaration of Abdication Act 1936, which legislates the abdication of King Edward VIII. He is succeeded by his brother the Duke of York as King George VI
- The Spanish Civil War begins. Eventually, 1135 Canadians will serve in the International Brigades of the Republican forces
- Quebec Premier Maurice Duplessis hangs a crucifix in the Legislative Assembly Chamber. It hung there for 83 years, until it was removed on 10 July 2019
- A crucifix was hung in the Quebec City Council chamber. The crucifix would hung there until 2025.

== Sport ==
- April 13 – The Ontario Hockey Association's West Toronto Nationals win their only Memorial Cup by defeating the Saskatchewan Junior Hockey League's Saskatoon Wesleys 2 games to 0
- August 8 – Frank Amyot wins a gold medal in canoeing, Men's C-1 1000 m at the 1936 Summer Olympics in Berlin
- December 5 – The Sarnia Imperials win their second and final Grey Cup by defeating the Ottawa Rough Riders 26 to 20 in the 24th Grey Cup played at Varsity Stadium

== Births ==
=== January to March ===
- January 18 – Albert Driedger, politician
- February 6 – Kent Douglas, ice hockey player and coach (d. 2009)
- February 9 – Stompin' Tom Connors, folk singer (d. 2013)
- February 18 – Ab McDonald, Canadian ice hockey player (d. 2018)
- February 29 – Henri Richard, ice hockey player
- March 1 – Monique Bégin, academic, politician and minister (d. 2023)
- March 21 – Ed Broadbent, politician and political scientist (d. 2024)
- March 24 – David Suzuki, science broadcaster and environmental activist

=== April to June ===
- April 17 – Peter Adams, politician
- April 19 – Sharon Pollock, playwright, actress, and director (d. 2021)
- May 14
  - Aline Chrétien, wife of Jean Chrétien (d. 2020)
  - Richard John Neuhaus, churchman and author (d. 2009)
- May 15 – Milan Kymlicka, arranger, composer and conductor (d. 2008)
- May 31 – Tony Pajaczkowski, football player (d. 2022)
- June 21 – Joseph Gosnell, Nisga'a statesman
- June 26
  - Herbert Obst, fencer
  - Jean-Claude Turcotte, cardinal (d. 2015)
- June 30 – Alan Hamel, entertainer, producer and television host

=== July to December ===
- July 3 – Larry Condon, politician (d. 1991)
- July 7 – Lowell Green, radio personality (d. 2026)
- July 9 – André Pronovost, ice hockey player
- July 13 – Sandor Stern, writer, director and film producer
- July 18 – Ted Harris, ice hockey player
- July 25 – August Schellenberg, actor (d. 2013)
- July 28 – Russ Jackson, football player
- August 20 – David MacDonald, politician and author
- September 7 – Bruce Gray, Puerto Rican/Canadian actor (d. 2017)
- September 26 – Lowell Murray, Senator
- October 9 – Don Wittman, sportscaster (d. 2008)
- October 27 – Suzanne Paradis, writer
- November 7 – Audrey McLaughlin, politician
- November 10 – Paul LeDuc, wrestler (d. 2026)
- December 16 – Karleen Bradford, children's author

=== Full date unknown ===
- Greg Curnoe, painter (d. 1992)
- Sheldon Turcott, journalist (d. 2000)

== Deaths ==
- January 8 – John Augustus Barron, politician and lawyer (b. 1850)
- January 10 – Walter Lea, politician and Premier of Prince Edward Island (b. 1874)
- January 20 – George V, King of Canada (b. 1865)
- January 22 – Noah Timmins, mining developer and executive (b. 1867)
- February 26 – Frederick C. Alderdice, businessman, politician and last Prime Minister of Newfoundland (b. 1871)
- May 7 – Isidore-Noël Belleau, politician and lawyer (b. 1848)
- May 30 – Homer Watson, artist (b. 1855)
- June 18 – Edith Jane Miller, concert contralto singer (b. 1875)
- July 6 – Peter Veniot, businessman, newspaper owner, politician and 17th Premier of New Brunswick (b. 1863)
- October 3 – William Parks, geologist and paleontologist (b. 1868)
- October 29 – Tobias Norris, politician and 10th Premier of Manitoba (b. 1861)

== See also ==
- List of Canadian films
