= 2017 in Canada =

- Decades: 1990s; 2000s; 2010s; 2020s
- See also: History of Canada; Timeline of Canadian history; List of years in Canada

Events from the year 2017 in Canada.

== Incumbents ==
=== The Crown ===
- Monarch – Elizabeth II

=== Federal government ===
- Governor General – David Johnston (until October 2), then Julie Payette
- Prime Minister – Justin Trudeau
- Parliament – 42nd

=== Provincial governments ===
==== Lieutenant Governors ====
- Lieutenant Governor of Alberta – Lois Mitchell
- Lieutenant Governor of British Columbia – Judith Guichon
- Lieutenant Governor of Manitoba – Janice Filmon
- Lieutenant Governor of New Brunswick – Jocelyne Roy-Vienneau
- Lieutenant Governor of Newfoundland and Labrador – Frank Fagan
- Lieutenant Governor of Nova Scotia – John James Grant (until June 28), then Arthur LeBlanc
- Lieutenant Governor of Ontario – Elizabeth Dowdeswell
- Lieutenant Governor of Prince Edward Island – Frank Lewis (until October 20), then Antoinette Perry
- Lieutenant Governor of Quebec – J. Michel Doyon
- Lieutenant Governor of Saskatchewan – Vaughn Solomon Schofield

==== Premiers ====
- Premier of Alberta – Rachel Notley
- Premier of British Columbia – Christy Clark (until July 18), then John Horgan
- Premier of Manitoba – Brian Pallister
- Premier of New Brunswick – Brian Gallant
- Premier of Newfoundland and Labrador – Dwight Ball
- Premier of Nova Scotia – Stephen McNeil
- Premier of Ontario – Kathleen Wynne
- Premier of Prince Edward Island – Wade MacLauchlan
- Premier of Quebec – Philippe Couillard
- Premier of Saskatchewan – Brad Wall

=== Territorial governments ===
==== Commissioners ====
- Commissioner of Yukon – Doug Phillips
- Commissioner of Northwest Territories – vacant (until June 26; Gerald W. Kisoun [acting]), then Margaret Thom (Note: After the retirement of George Tuccaro on May 10, 2016, the position has been vacant. The responsibilities of the Commissioner are being undertaken by Deputy Commissioner Gerald W. Kisoun.)
- Commissioner of Nunavut – Nellie Kusugak

==== Premiers ====
- Premier of the Northwest Territories – Bob McLeod
- Premier of Nunavut – Peter Taptuna (until November 21), then Paul Quassa
- Premier of Yukon – Sandy Silver

== Events ==
=== January ===
- January 26 – A farmer's market in Calgary was destroyed in a fire. 32 vendors were affected.
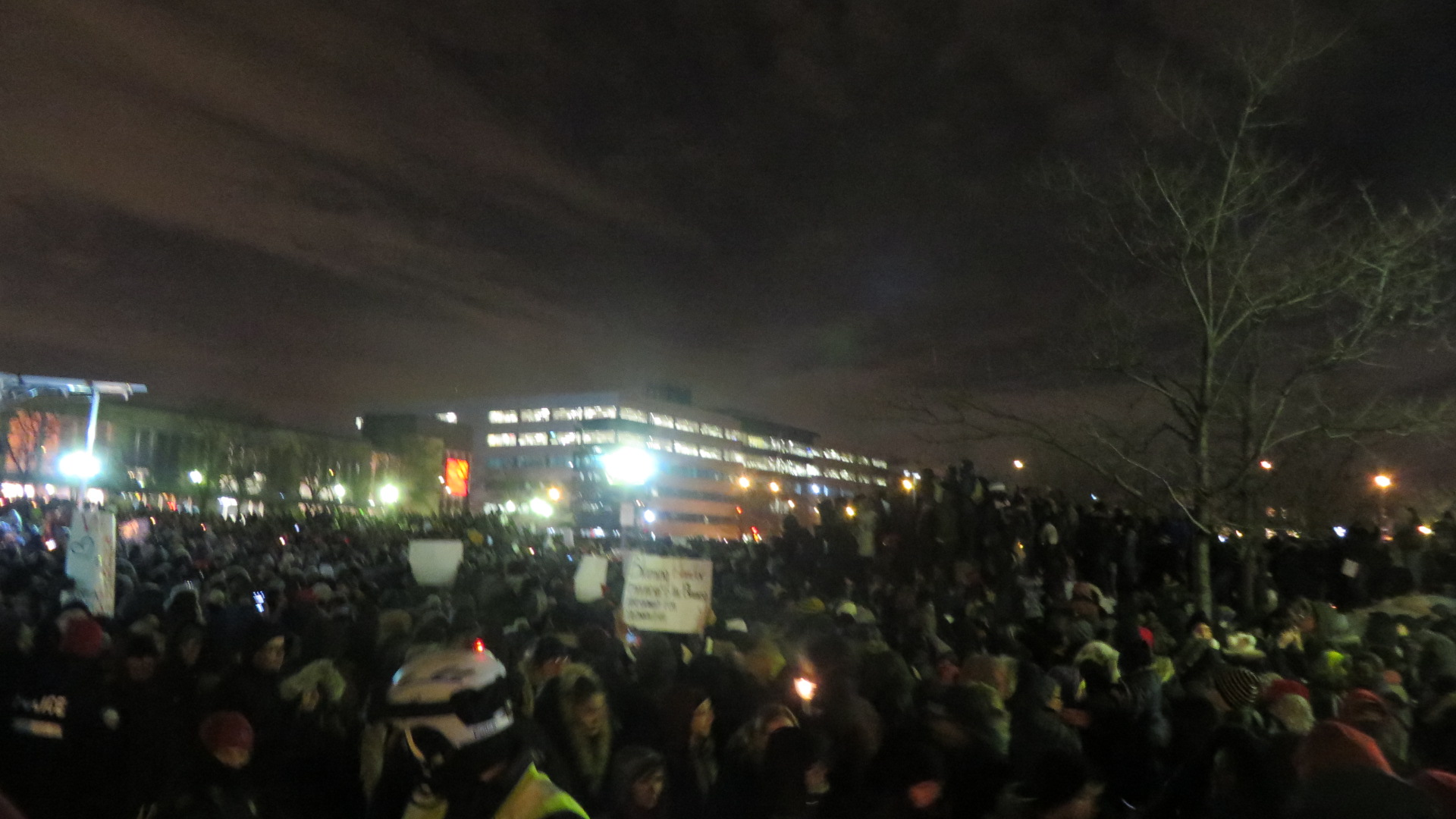
- A vigil being held for the victims of the Quebec City mosque shooting at Park Avenue Station in Montreal.
  January 29 – A Quebec City mosque was the subject of a mass shooting. There were six deaths and numerous others injured.

=== February ===
- February 6 – Sapphire Jubilee of Elizabeth II's accession as Queen of Canada

=== March ===
- March 5 – Marked the start of a major blizzard that affected most of western and northern Manitoba and eastern Saskatchewan. A number of schools were shut down for the first time in thirty years. It was caused by a cyclone-intense Colorado Low.
- March 12 – Daylight saving time goes into effect.
- March 18 – Jason Kenney is elected as leader of the Alberta PC Party.

=== April ===
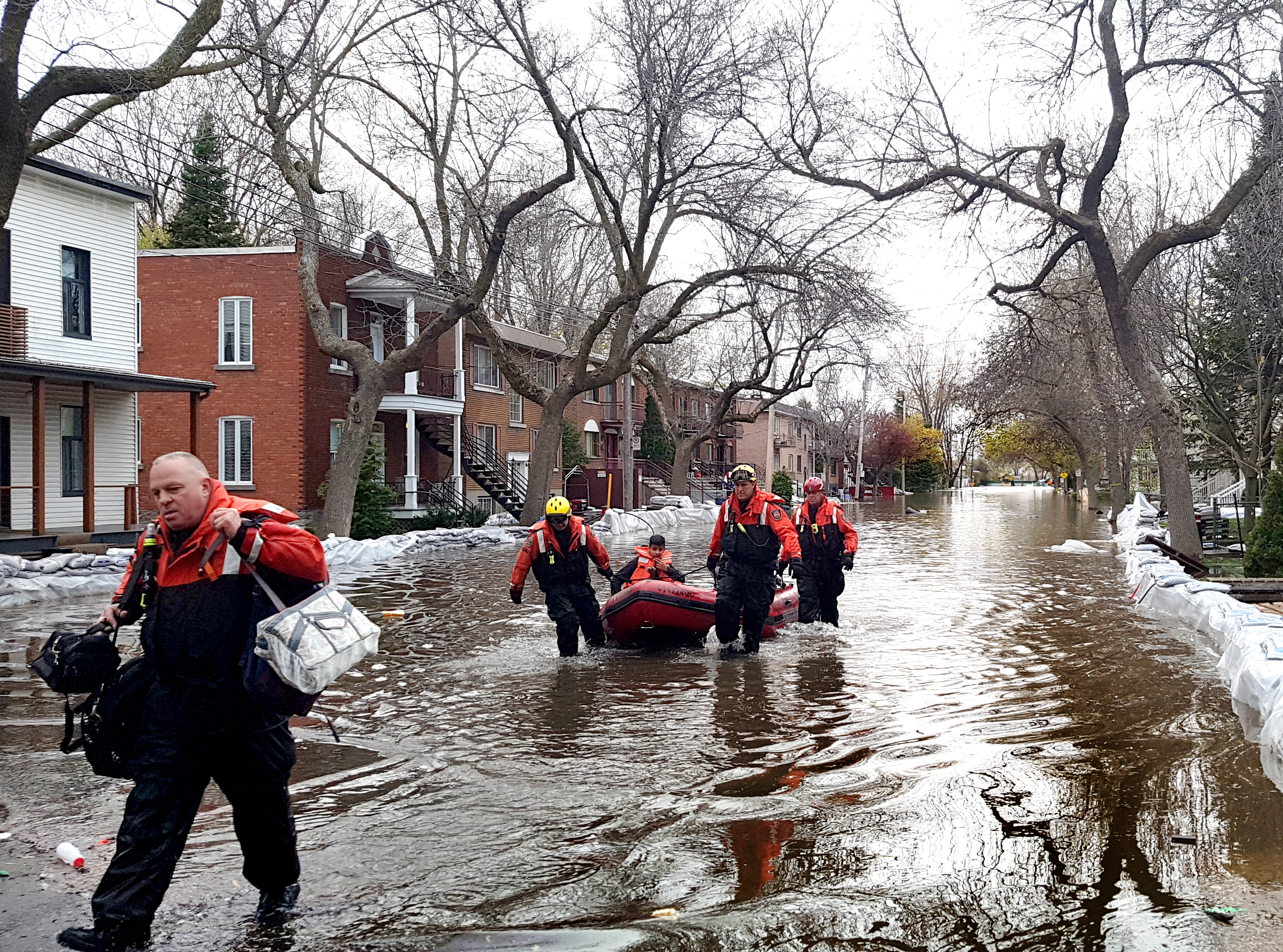
Rescuers working during the Quebec flooding on May 8.

- April 5 – end of May – Floods hit Eastern Canada, with Quebec the hardest hit. Two people are killed and 2,720 are forced from their homes. Montreal declared a state of emergency.
- April 22 – 19 year old Serena McKay is beaten to death by two female classmates in Sagkeeng First Nation, Manitoba. The case provoked outrage, with the videos of the murder being posted online.

=== May ===
- May 9 – The British Columbia general election resulted in no single party winning a majority.
- May 27 – The Conservative Party of Canada leadership election was won by Andrew Scheer, replacing interim leader Rona Ambrose.
- May 29 – The Green Party of British Columbia announced that they would support the British Columbia New Democratic Party in the Legislative Assembly. This would result in a minority government and NDP leader John Horgan becoming the 36th Premier of British Columbia.
- May 30 – The Nova Scotia general election resulted in a majority government and re-election for the Liberal Party, led by Premier Stephen McNeil.

=== June ===
- June 13 – A Twitter account known as "CanadaCreep" is reported to police. The account was shut down, dozens of terabytes of data were seized by police and a Calgary man faced voyeurism charges.
- June 19 – An amendment is made to the Canadian Human Rights Act and Criminal Code to add a prohibition against discrimination of transgender individuals.
- June 29 - July 1 - As part of the Canada 150 celebrations, Prince Charles and the Dutchess of Cornwall, Camilla made an appearance in Nunavut, Trenton and Ottawa.

=== July ===
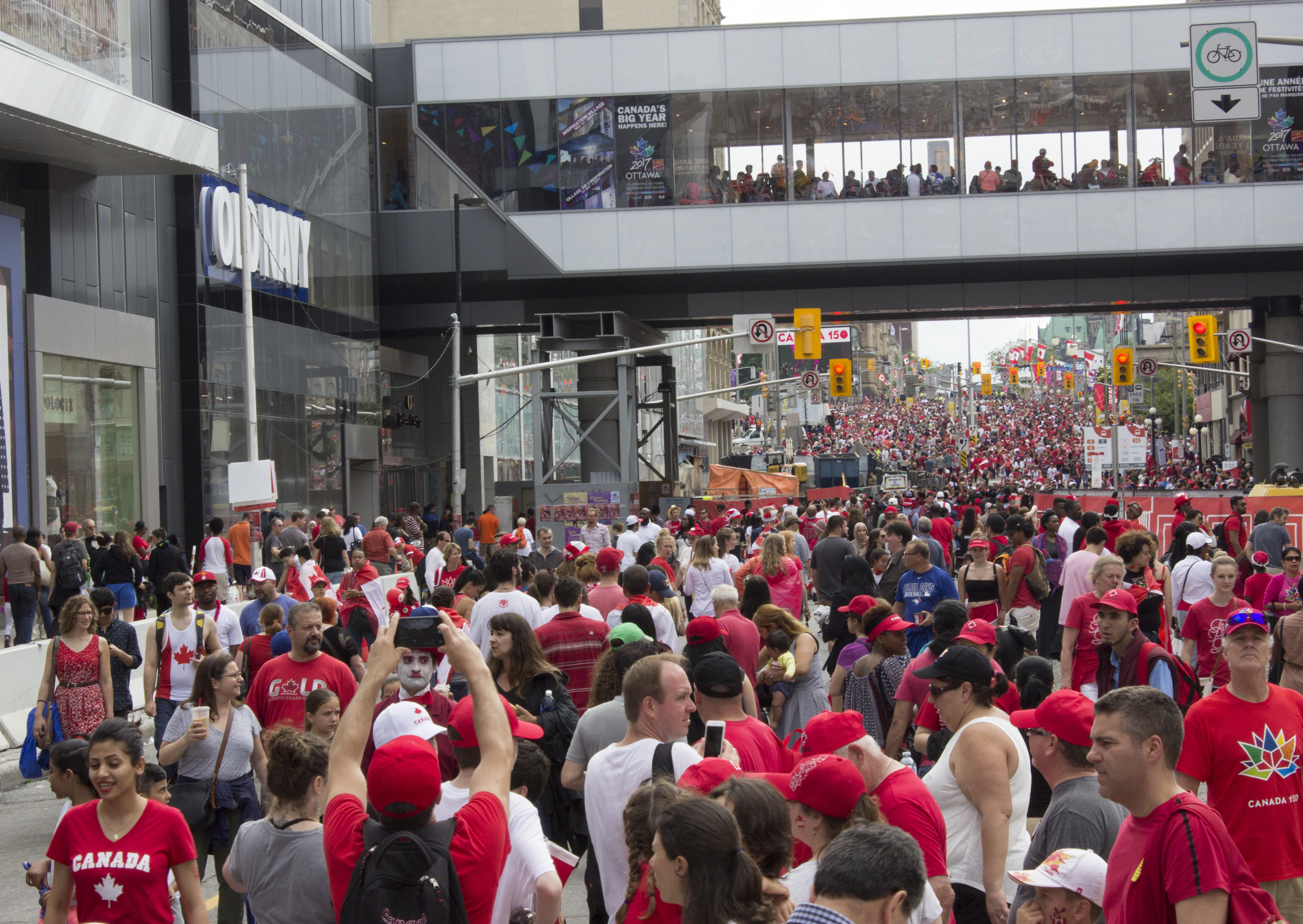
- Canada 150 celebrations on Rideau Street in Ottawa on Canada Day.
  July 1 – Canada celebrates the sesquicentennial anniversary of Canadian Confederation.
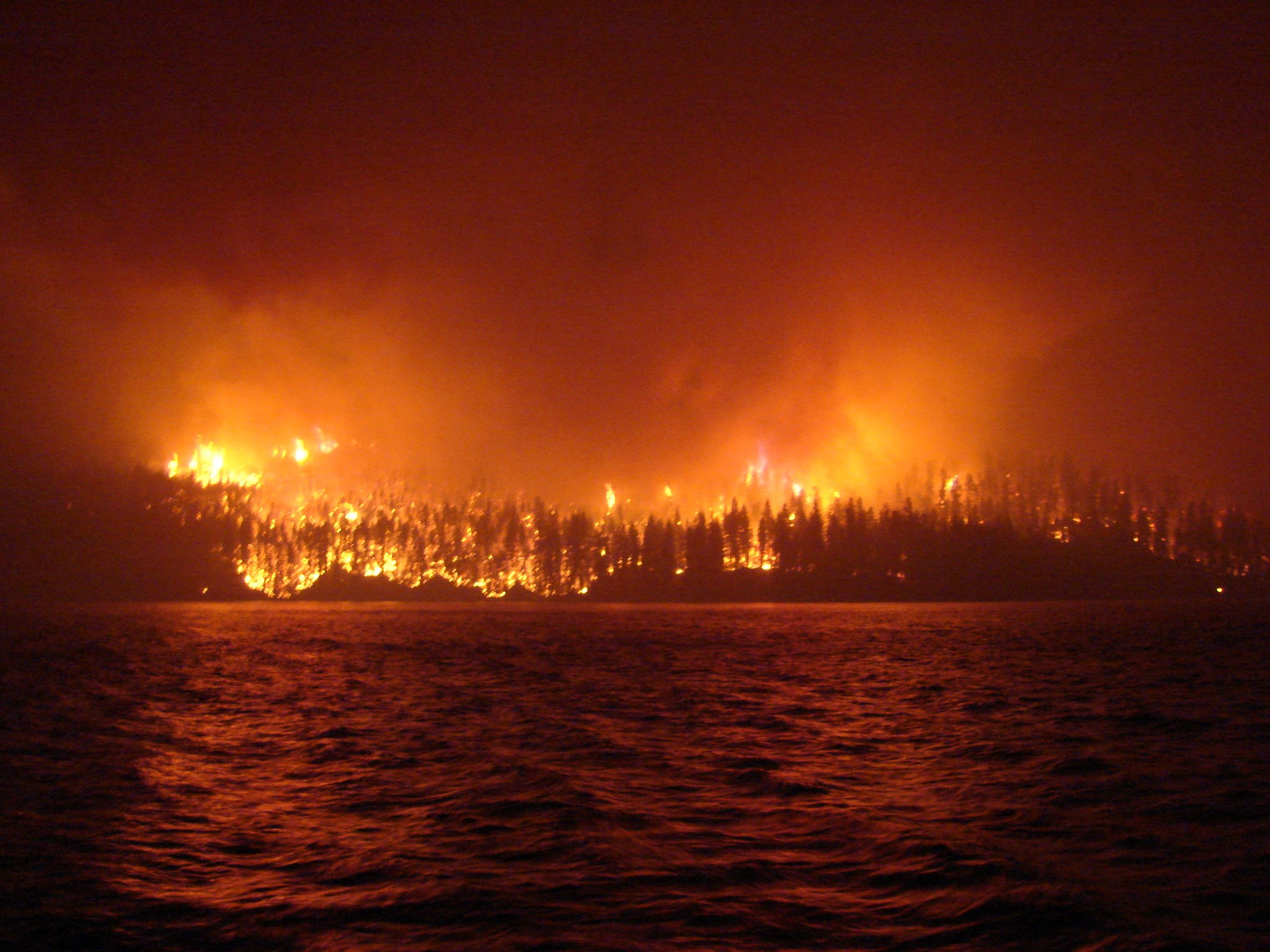
- Photograph of a wildfire burning on July 16, taken in Ashcroft Reserve, British Columbia.
  July 6 – September 20 – Wildfires in British Columbia result in the evacuation of 39,000 people, the burning of 1,212,336 hectares and the destruction of at least 305 buildings.
- July 18 – Ratification of the Agreement on the Cree Nation Governance between the Cree people of Eeyou Istchee and the government of Canada.
- July 18 – Former nurse and serial killer Elizabeth Wettlaufer is sentenced to eight concurrent life terms in prison, after pleading guilty to eight murders and four counts of attempted murder. All her victims had been elderly patients under her care, whom she had injected with large doses of insulin.
- July 28 – Opening ceremony of the 2017 Canada Summer Games in Winnipeg.

=== August ===
- August 10 – Premier of Saskatchewan, Brad Wall, announces his pending retirement from politics.
- August 21 - A partial solar eclipse takes place across Canada. Viewing parties were hosted all across Canada.
- August 31 - Ontario teachers and education workers contracts expires and the new contracts take effect.

=== September ===
- September 30 – 2017 Edmonton attack; A suspected terrorist vehicle ramming attack occurs in Edmonton. Five people are injured and the suspect is taken into police custody.

=== October ===
- October 1 – Jagmeet Singh wins the 2017 NDP leadership election, becoming the first visible minority and first Sikh to lead a major federal political party in Canada.
- October 16 to November 20 - In Ontario, over 12,000 OPSEU college faculty members went on strike, demanding better job security, increased academic freedom and higher wages.
- October 18 – The National Assembly in Quebec passes a law that bans people in Quebec with face coverings from getting public services.

=== November ===
- November 6 – Abbotsford Police Department officer John Davidson is shot and killed while responding to a stolen car incident.
- November 30 – The National Assembly in Quebec unanimous passes a Parti Quebecois motion calling on businesses to simply say, 'Bonjour' instead of bonjour/hi.

=== December ===
- December 16 - The NHL 100 Classic to celebrate the National Hockey League's 100th anniversary is held at Ottawa's Lansdowne Park in Canada.
- December 17 – an extension to Line 1 Yonge–University on the Toronto subway opens, marks first time TTC stretches outside Toronto, to Vaughan.
- Late December – January 2018 – A cold wave brings record low temperatures to much of the country.

== Arts, literature and sports ==
=== Sports ===
- July 9 – The Canada men's national under-19 basketball team wins the 2017 FIBA Under-19 Basketball World Cup for the first time.
- September 23 to September 30 – The 2017 Invictus Games are held in Toronto
- November 4 – Georges St-Pierre becomes 1st Canadian UFC Middleweight Champion by defeating Michael Bisping at UFC 217.
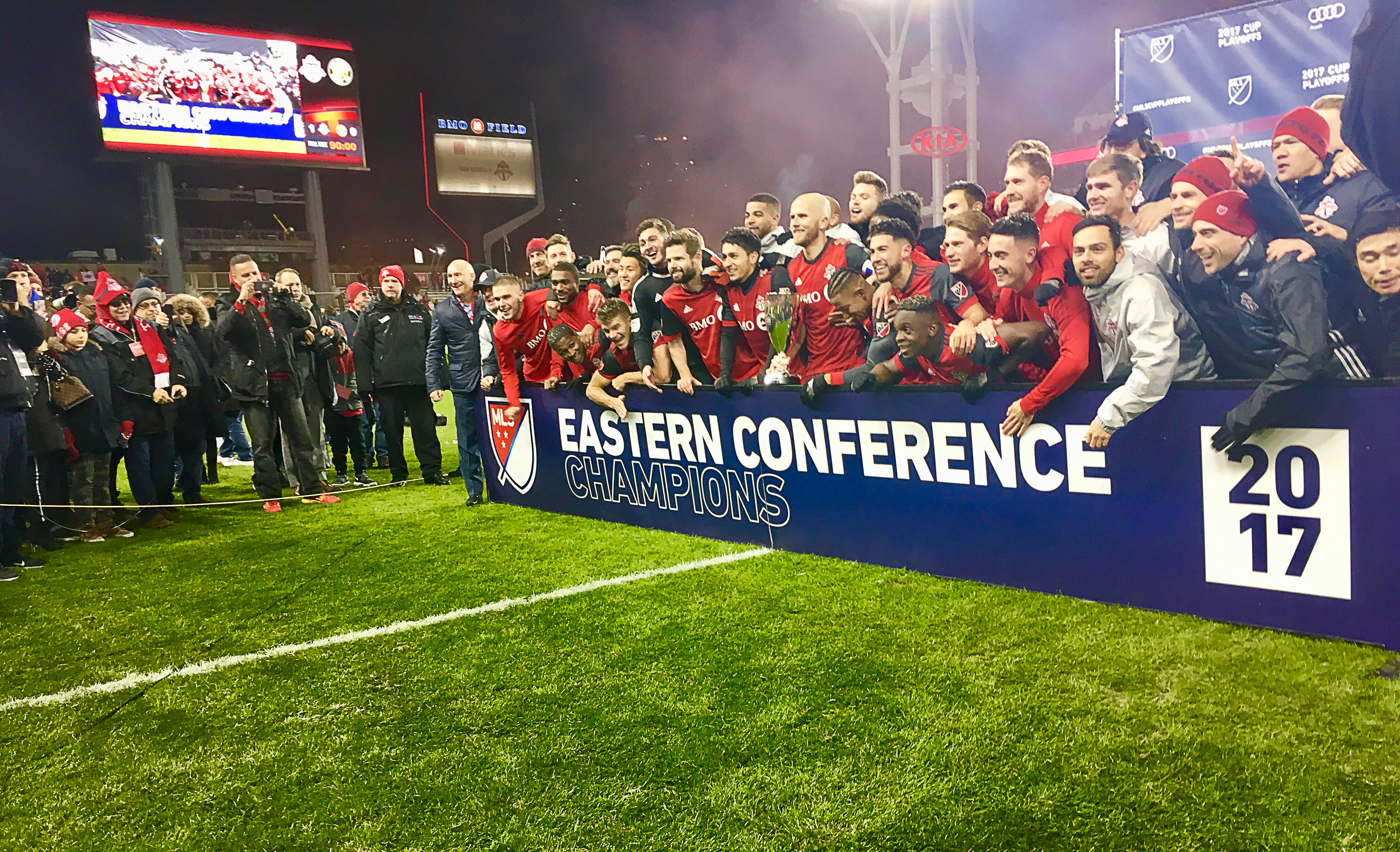
- Toronto FC celebrates winning the Eastern Conference on November 29 at BMO Field in Toronto.
  December 9 – Toronto FC becomes the first team in Major League Soccer history to win the domestic treble and the first Canadian team to win MLS Cup. (see also: 2017 Toronto FC season)

== Deaths ==
=== January ===
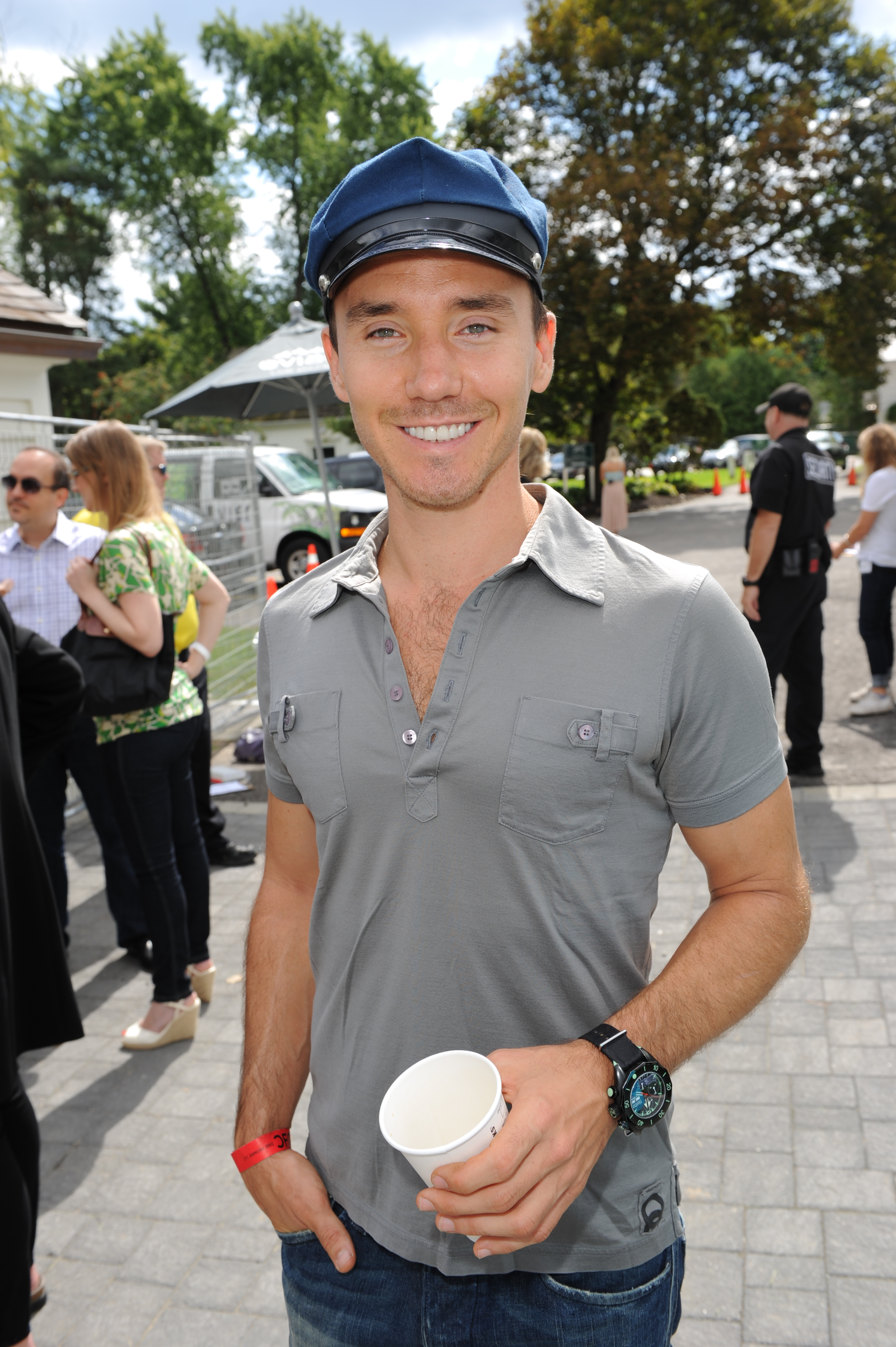
Rob Stewart died January 31

- January 1 –
  - Yvon Dupuis, politician
  - Stuart Hamilton, musician and broadcaster (b. 1929)
  - Bill Marshall, film producer, co-founder of the Toronto International Film Festival, Toronto political campaign manager (b. 1939)
- January 2 – Tom Harpur, classicist, theologian, priest, and journalist
- January 3 –
  - Mike Buchanan, ice hockey player
  - Peter Pollen, mayor of Victoria, British Columbia (1971–1975, 1981–1985)
- January 25 – Marcel Prud'homme, MP (1964–1993) and Senator (1993–2009)
- January 26 – Raynald Guay, former MP (1963–1980)
- January 28 – Sang Chul Lee, Moderator of the United Church of Canada (1988–1990)
- January 31 – Rob Stewart, film director and conservationist

=== February ===
- February 19 – Bob White, trade unionist
- February 22 –
  - Gordon Gray Currie, politician and sports coach
  - John McCormack, ice hockey player
- February 23 –
  - Don Cousens, politician
  - Bernie Custis, football player and coach
- February 28 – Pierre Pascau, journalist and radio host

=== March ===
- March 3 – Aquinas Ryan, politician and educator
- March 4
  - Bonnie Burnard, short story writer and novelist
  - Edna Rose Ritchings, symbolic maintainer of the International Peace Mission movement
- March 8 – Margaret Mitchell, politician
- March 11 – Richard Wagamese, writer
- March 12 – Harvey Smith, politician
- March 13
  - Vincent Foy, Roman Catholic cleric and theologian (b.1915)
  - Ed Whitlock, long-distance runner
- March 14 – Arleene Johnson, baseball player
- March 15 – Laurent Laplante, journalist, essayist and detective writer
- March 19
  - Bob Robertson, comedian (Double Exposure)
  - Len Mitzel, politician
- March 20
  - Betty Kennedy, broadcaster, journalist, author, and Senator
  - Terence Finlay, Anglican bishop
- March 21 – Bill Rompkey, politician
- March 23 – Denis McGrath, screenwriter and producer
- March 25 – Gary Doak, ice hockey player
- March 27 – Beau Dick, Northwest coast artist
- March 28 – Janine Sutto, actress and comedian

=== April ===
- April 2 – André Drouin, Hérouxville city councillor and author of the Hérouxville Standards
- April 6 – Peter Savaryn, lawyer and former Chancellor of the University of Alberta
- April 9 – Bill Sutherland, ice hockey player
- April 11 – Mark Wainberg, HIV/AIDS researcher and activist
- April 18 – Ron Moeser, Toronto city councillor
- April 20 – Paul Hébert, actor and director
- April 23 – Charles Foster, writer
- April 25 – Sasha Lakovic, ice hockey player
- April 27 – Peter George, 6th President and Vice-Chancellor of McMaster University

=== May ===
- May 2 –
  - Paul MacEwan, politician
  - Gerry Martiniuk, politician
- May 3 – Georgie Collins, film, stage, and television actress
- May 8 – John David Molson, businessman and former president of the Montreal Canadiens
- May 9 – Ron Atkey, lawyer, law professor and politician
- May 10 – Ted Hibberd, ice hockey player
- May 13 – Marcel Pelletier, ice hockey player and management official
- May 15 – Stan Kaluznick, football player
- May 17 – Michael Bliss, historian and author
- May 20 – Roger Tassé, lawyer and civil servant
- May 21 – Bill White, ice hockey player.
- May 24 – Grace McCarthy, politician
- May 25 – Saucy Sylvia, comedian, pianist, singer and radio personality
- May 31 – Diane Torr, dancer and performing artist

=== June ===
- June 4 – Avie Bennett, businessman and philanthropist
- June 5 – Marilyn Hall, television and theatre producer
- June 8 – Sam Panopoulos, cook and businessman
- June 14 – Don Matthews, football player and coach
- June 18 – Tim Hauge, mixed martial artist and boxer
- June 22 – Hervé Filion, harness racing driver
- June 27 – Ric Suggitt, rugby union player and coach
- June 29 – Dave Semenko, ice hockey player.

=== July ===
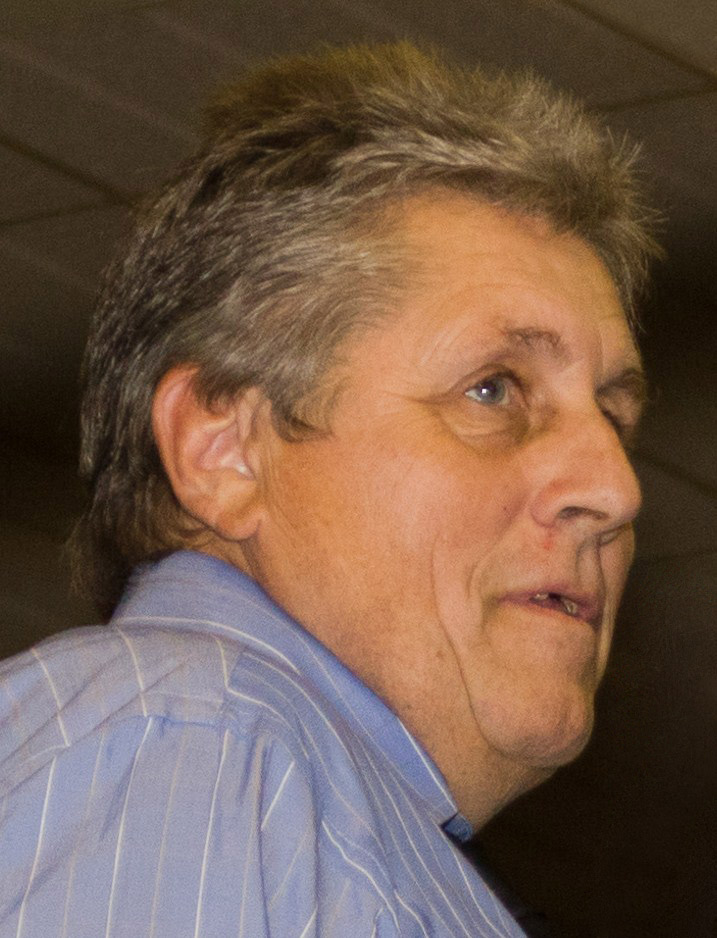
Smith Hart died July 2

- July 2 – Smith Hart, professional wrestler
- July 5 – John Rodriguez, former Member of parliament and mayor of Greater Sudbury, Ontario
- July 12 – Tod Sloan, ice hockey player
- July 16 – George A. Romero, American-born horror film director
- July 17 – Harvey Atkin, actor and voice actor
- July 28 – Maurice Filion, ice hockey coach and general manager

=== August ===
- August 12 – Bryan Murray, ice hockey executive and coach
- August 21 – Boris Spremo, photojournalist and Order of Canada recipient
- August 30 – Skip Prokop, drummer and band leader for rock bands The Paupers and Lighthouse

=== September ===
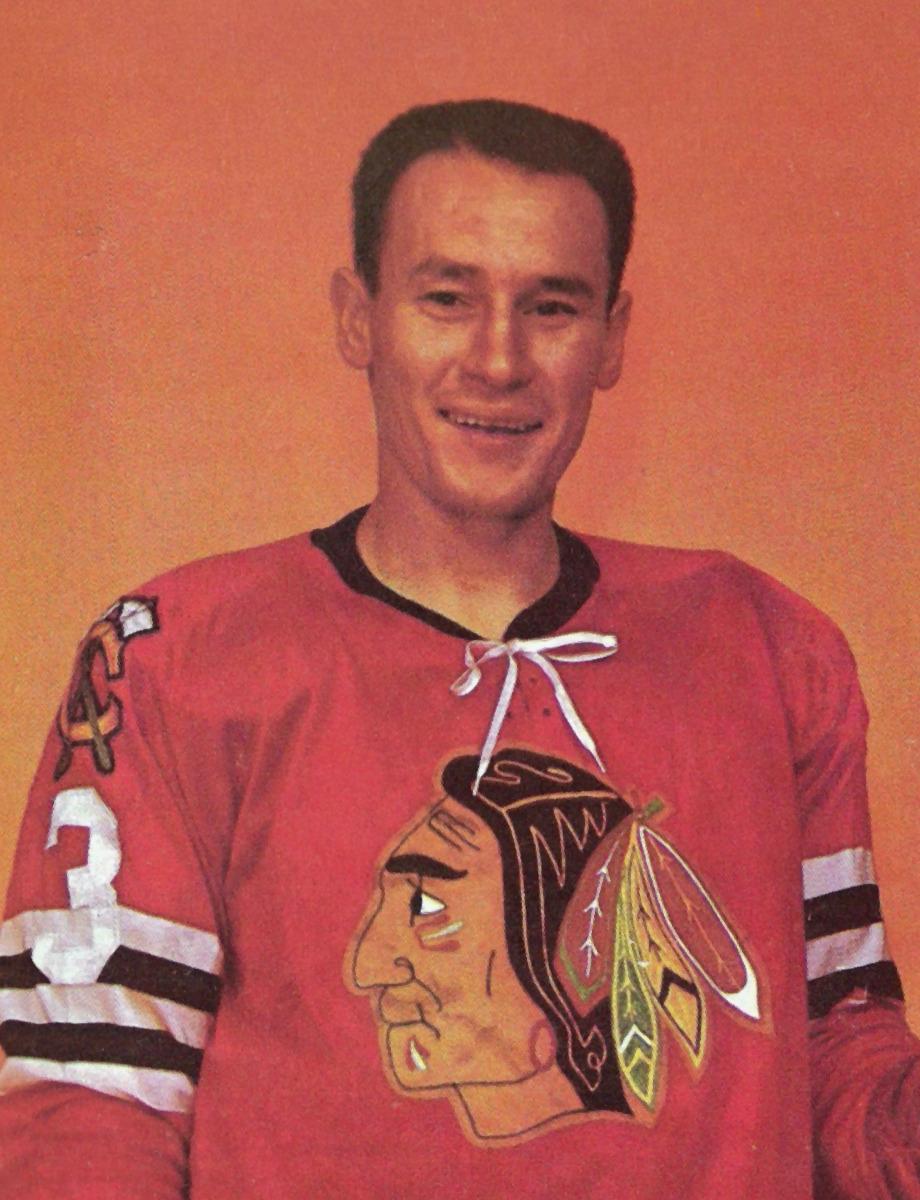
Pierre Pilote died September 9

- September 9 – Pierre Pilote, ice hockey player
- September 12 – Allan MacEachen, politician and first Deputy Prime Minister of Canada
- September 14 – Arnold Chan, lawyer and politician, Member of Parliament
- September 30 – Monty Hall, game show host, producer and philanthropist

=== October ===
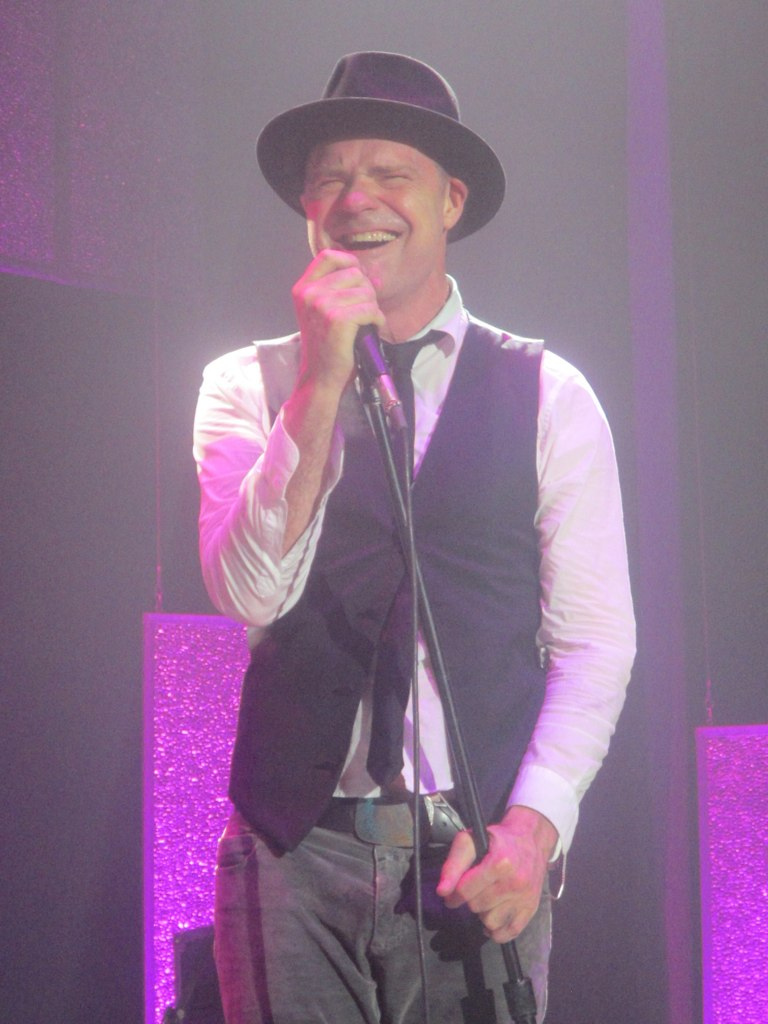
Gord Downie died October 17

- October 16 – John Dunsworth, actor best known for his role in Trailer Park Boys
- October 17 – Gord Downie, lead singer of rock band The Tragically Hip
- October 29 – Richard Hambleton, artist known for his street art

=== December ===
- December 5 – August Ames, pornographic actress
- December 13 – Barry Sherman, businessman and philanthropist

== See also ==
- 2017 in Canadian television
- List of Canadian films of 2017
