= J. Robert Janes =

Canadian writer (1935–2022)

- Born: Joseph Robert Janes; May 23, 1935; Toronto, Canada
- Died: February 28, 2022 (aged 86)
- Education: Brock University
- Occupation: Author
- Writing career
- Genre: Mystery

Joseph Robert Janes (May 23, 1935 – February 28, 2022) was a Canadian author. He was born in Toronto.

A mining engineer by profession, he taught geology, geography and high school mathematics and later geology at Brock University until he dedicated himself to writing full-time in 1970.

Janes published more than 20 adult novels, five mystery novels for young adults, and textbooks on the subject of geology. His character-rich mysteries set in Occupied France during World War II, and featuring Chief Inspector Jean-Louis St-Cyr of the Sûreté and Detektiv Inspektor Hermann Kohler of the Nazi Gestapo, are his most popular works and have been critically acclaimed by The Wall Street Journal, amongst others, for their historical accuracy. The U.S.-based Western Society for French History used his writings as a study of the convergence of fiction with history.

Janes died on February 28, 2022, at the age of 86.

== Published works ==
=== St-Cyr and Kohler series ===
- Mayhem (1992)
- Carousel (1992)
- Kaleidoscope (1993)
- Salamander (1994)
- Mannequin (1994)
- Dollmaker (1995)
- Stonekiller (1995)
- Sandman (1996)
- Gypsy (1997)
- Madrigal (1999)
- Beekeeper (2001)
- Flykiller (2002)
- Bellringer (2012)
- Tapestry (2013)
- Carnival (2014)
- Clandestine (2015)

=== Other works ===
- The Odd-Lot Boys and the Tree-Fort War (1976)
- The Toy Shop (1981)
- Danger on the River (1982)
- The Watcher (1982)
- The Third Story (1983)
- The Hiding Place (1984)
- Murder in the Market (1985)
- Spies for Dinner (1985)
- The Alice Factor (1991)
- The Hunting Ground (2013)
- Betrayal (2014)
- The Sleeper (2015)
- The Little Parachute (2016)
