= Mary V. Seeman =

Canadian psychiatrist (1935–2024)

Professor Mary V. Seeman OC FRCPC

Personal details
- Born: March 24, 1935 Poland
- Died: April 23, 2024 (aged 89)
- Occupation: Psychiatrist

Mary V. Seeman (March 24, 1935 – April 23, 2024) was a Canadian psychiatrist who was a professor in the Department of Psychiatry at the University of Toronto. She served as the Tapscott Chair in Schizophrenia from 1997 to 2000.

Seeman wrote on gender influences on outcome in schizophrenia, women in schizophrenia, and the impact of parenting with a mental illness.

She also worked as a psychiatrist at the Centre for Addiction and Mental Health (CAMH) and at the Mount Sinai Hospital, both in Toronto.

== Recognition ==
Seeman became a Fellow of the Royal College of Physicians and Surgeons of Canada (FRCPC) in 1972, and was appointed Officer of the Order of Canada (OC) in 2006. In 2012 she received the Queen Elizabeth II Diamond Jubilee Medal.

== Personal life ==
She was born in Łódź, Poland as Mary Violette Szwarc. As a child, she fled Nazi-occupied Poland with her family via Portugal and settled in Canada.

She was married to scientist Philip Seeman. Together, they were parents to Marc, Bob, and Neil Seeman, and grandparents to Ahron, Geoff, Ciara, David, Ronan, and Dori.

Mary V. Seeman died on April 23, 2024, at the age of 89.

== Publications ==
=== Books ===
- Reupert, A; Maybery, D; Nicholson, J; Göpfert, M; Seeman, M V. (2015). Parental Psychiatric Disorder: Distressed Parents and their Families. Cambridge University Press. ISBN 9781107070684.
- Seeman, M.V. (1982). Living and working with schizophrenia. Toronto: University of Toronto Press. ISBN 0802064744. OCLC 9039169.
- Seeman, M. V. (1995). Gender and psychopathology (1st ed.). Washington, DC: American Psychiatric Press. ISBN 0880485647. OCLC 32051439. Trove
