= 2015 in Canada =

- Decades: 1990s; 2000s; 2010s; 2020s
- See also: History of Canada; Timeline of Canadian history; List of years in Canada

Events from the year 2015 in Canada.

== Incumbents ==
=== Crown ===
- Monarch – Elizabeth II

=== Federal government ===
- Governor General – David Johnston
- Prime Minister – Stephen Harper (until November 4), then Justin Trudeau
- Chief Justice – Beverley McLachlin (British Columbia)
- Parliament – 41st (until August 2), then 42nd (from December 3)

=== Provincial governments ===
==== Lieutenant Governors ====
- Lieutenant Governor of Alberta – Donald Ethell (until June 12), then Lois Mitchell
- Lieutenant Governor of British Columbia – Judith Guichon
- Lieutenant Governor of Manitoba – Philip S. Lee (until June 19), then Janice Filmon
- Lieutenant Governor of New Brunswick – Jocelyne Roy-Vienneau
- Lieutenant Governor of Newfoundland and Labrador – Frank Fagan
- Lieutenant Governor of Nova Scotia – John James Grant
- Lieutenant Governor of Ontario – Elizabeth Dowdeswell
- Lieutenant Governor of Prince Edward Island – Frank Lewis
- Lieutenant Governor of Quebec – Pierre Duchesne (until September 24), then J. Michel Doyon
- Lieutenant Governor of Saskatchewan – Vaughn Solomon Schofield

==== Premiers ====
- Premier of Alberta – Jim Prentice (until May 24), then Rachel Notley
- Premier of British Columbia – Christy Clark
- Premier of Manitoba – Greg Selinger
- Premier of New Brunswick – Brian Gallant
- Premier of Newfoundland and Labrador – Paul Davis (until December 14), then Dwight Ball
- Premier of Nova Scotia – Stephen McNeil
- Premier of Ontario – Kathleen Wynne
- Premier of Prince Edward Island – Robert Ghiz (until February 23), then Wade MacLauchlan
- Premier of Quebec – Philippe Couillard
- Premier of Saskatchewan – Brad Wall

=== Territorial governments ===
==== Commissioners ====
- Commissioner of Yukon – Doug Phillips
- Commissioner of Northwest Territories – George Tuccaro
- Commissioner of Nunavut – Edna Elias (until May 11), Vacant (May 11–June 23), then Nellie Kusugak

==== Premiers ====
- Premier of the Northwest Territories – Bob McLeod
- Premier of Nunavut – Peter Taptuna
- Premier of Yukon – Darrell Pasloski

== Events ==
=== January to April ===
- January 1 – A shooting results in the death of one person and injuries to six people in Killarney, Calgary with police making no arrests.
- January 15 – Target Corporation announces they will discontinue operations in Canada. Over 130 stores and over 17,000 workers are affected.
- February 14 – A 100-car train carrying crude oil derails approximately 30 kilometres from Gogama, Ontario.
- February 15 – 50th anniversary of the National Flag of Canada
- February 23 – A Fort McMurray, Alberta family was poisoned after attempting to kill bedbugs using illegally imported phosphine tablets. An eight-month-old child died and five others were hospitalized. A second child died in hospital.
- February 25 – A house burned to the ground near Kane, which is about 25 km west of Morris, Manitoba. Four children under the age of 15 were killed in the fire.
- March 8 – Three weeks after the February 14 train derailment near Gogama, Ontario, 35 Canadian National Railway cars derail at a site four kilometres from the town, spilling crude into the Makami River and igniting a fire that takes several days to extinguish. The two incidents spark renewed debate on the effectiveness of Canada's rail safety regulations in the wake of the Lac-Mégantic rail disaster of 2013.
- March 16 – John Baird, the former Conservative cabinet minister and the MP for Ottawa West—Nepean, resigns his seat.
- March 26 – With the enactment of the United Kingdom's Succession to the Crown Act 2013, and assent from Canada's Succession to the Throne Act, 2013, the succession to the Canadian throne is changed from eldest son to eldest child for royals born after October 28, 2011.
- March 30 – Canadian Parliament votes to extend the mission to targets in Syria.
- March 31 – James Lunney, Conservative MP for Nanaimo—Alberni leaves the Conservative Party caucus to sit as an independent, citing concerns about religious freedom.
- April 8 – Canadian airstrike operations in Syria begin, with an airstrikes on ISIL garrison near Raqqa.

=== May to November ===
- May 4 – Prince Edward Island general election – won by the Liberals.
- May 5 – Alberta general election – won by the NDP.
- July 3 – A mail bomb detonates and injures a Winnipeg lawyer. A former client is charged in this incident as well as at least two other incidents.
- September 15 – A two-year-old child and her father are murdered in Blairmore, Alberta. An acquaintance of both father and mother faced charges in the crime.
- October 19 – Justin Trudeau and the Liberals win the 2015 federal election, gaining a majority of seats in the House of Commons.
- October 20 – Prime Minister-designate Justin Trudeau informed President Barack Obama that Canada intended to withdraw its air units from the mission while keeping its ground forces in Iraq and Syria.
- November 4 – Justin Trudeau is sworn in as the 23rd Prime Minister of Canada.
- November 23 – Northwest Territories general election, was held.
- November 26 – Prime Minister Justin Trudeau amended the Canadian withdrawal to just the fighter aircraft. All other aircraft already deployed would remain in theatre.
- November 30 – Newfoundland and Labrador general election – won by the Liberals.

== Sport ==
- December 26, 2014, to January 5 – 2015 World Junior Ice Hockey Championships in Montreal and Toronto
- January 19 to 25 – 2015 Canadian Figure Skating Championships – Kingston, Ontario
- January 24 to February 1 – 2015 Canadian Junior Curling Championships – Corner Brook, Newfoundland and Labrador
- February 14 to 22 – 2015 Scotties Tournament of Hearts – Moose Jaw, Saskatchewan
- February 13 to March 1 – 2015 Canada Winter Games – Prince George, British Columbia
- February 28 to March 8 – 2015 Tim Hortons Brier – Calgary, Alberta
- March 28 to April 5 – 2015 Ford World Men's Curling Championship – Halifax, Nova Scotia
- 2015 CFL draft
- May 31 – Oshawa Generals won their Fifth Memorial Cup by defeating the Kelowna Rockets 2 to 1. The Tournament was played at the Colisée Pepsi in Quebec City, Quebec
- 2015 Canadian Grand Prix
- June 6 to July 5 – 2015 FIFA Women's World Cup in Edmonton, Moncton, Montreal, Ottawa, Vancouver, and Winnipeg
- June 15 – Winnipeg's Duncan Keith of the Chicago Blackhawks is awarded the Conn Smythe Trophy
- June 20 – David Lemieux becomes the first Canadian to win the International Boxing Federation middleweight Championship by defeating Hassan N'Dam N'Jikam
- June 26 to July 5 – 2015 ISF Men's World Championship – Saskatoon, Saskatchewan
- July 10 to 26 – 2015 Pan American Games in Toronto amongst others
- 2015 SportsCar Grand Prix
- July 26 – Canadian Open – Quebec
- 2015 Honda Indy Toronto
- 2015 Pan American Junior Athletics Championships – Edmonton
- August 7 to 14 – 2015 Parapan American Games in Toronto amongst others
- August 22 to 30 – Canada at the 2015 World Championships in Athletics in Beijing, China
- November 28 – UBC Thunderbirds won their Fourth Vanier Cup by defeating the Montreal Carabins 31 to 26 in the 52nd Grey Cup played at Telus Stadium in Quebec City
- November 29 – Edmonton Eskimos won their Fourteenth Grey Cup by defeating the Ottawa Redblacks 26 to 20 in the 103rd Grey Cup played at Investors Group Field in Winnipeg. Markham, Ontario's Shamawd Chambers is awarded Most Outstanding Canadian

== Arts and literature ==
- March 1 – 3rd Canadian Screen Awards
- March 2 – Plum Johnson wins the RBC Taylor Prize for her memoir They Left Us Everything
- March 11 – Joseph Heath wins the Shaughnessy Cohen Prize for Political Writing for Enlightenment 2.0: Restoring Sanity to Our Politics, Our Economy, and Our Lives
- March 14–15 – Juno Awards of 2015
- March 15 – 17th Jutra Awards
- March 19 – Kim Thúy's novel Ru wins the 2015 edition of Canada Reads
- April 30 – Terry Fallis wins the Stephen Leacock Memorial Medal for Humour for No Relation, his second win of that award.
- September 10–20 – 2015 Toronto International Film Festival
- September 21 – Buffy Sainte-Marie wins the 2015 Polaris Music Prize for her album Power in the Blood
- October 28 – 2015 Governor General's Awards winners are announced
- November 10 – André Alexis wins the Scotiabank Giller Prize for his novel Fifteen Dogs

== Deaths in 2015 ==
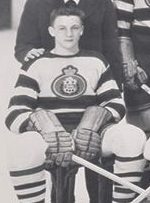
Dickie Moore died December 19

=== January ===
- January 1 – Eric Cunningham, 65, politician, Ontario MPP for Wentworth North (1975–1984) (born 1949).
- January 5
  - Jim Burton, 53, ice hockey player (Hershey Bears) and coach, heart attack (born 1951).
  - Dan Held, 53, ice hockey player (born 1951).
- January 7
  - Gilbert Finn, 94, businessman, Lieutenant Governor of New Brunswick (1987–1994) (born 1920).
  - J. P. Parisé, 73, ice hockey player, (Minnesota North Stars), lung cancer (born 1941).
- January 10 – Francis Simard, 67, revolution activist and criminal, aneurism (born 1947).
- January 16 – Ted Harrison, 88, painter (born 1926).
- January 17 – Don Harron, 90, comedian (born 1924).
- January 24 – Link Byfield, Canadian journalist and author (born 1951)
- January 27 – Joseph Rotman, 80, businessman and philanthropist
- January 31 – Vic Howe, 85, ice hockey player (New York Rangers), dementia and cardiac arrest (born 1929).

=== February ===
- February 9
  - Claude Ruel, 76, ice hockey coach and executive (born 1938).
  - Max Yalden, 84, civil servant and diplomat
- February 13 – John Robert Evans, 85, academic and businessperson
- February 15 – Steve Montador, 35, ice hockey player (born 1979).

=== March ===
- March 20 – Bud Ings, 89, former member of the Legislative Assembly of Prince Edward Island
- March 21 – Alberta Watson, 60, film and television actress (born 1955)
- March 25 – Richard Butson, 92, mountaineer (born 1922)

=== April ===
- April 4 – Elmer Lach, 97, ice hockey player (born 1918)
- April 6 – Dollard St. Laurent, 85, ice hockey player (born 1929)
- April 9 – Jurgen Gothe, 70 or 71, CBC Radio broadcaster (born 1944)
- April 26 – Marcel Pronovost, 84, ice hockey player, Hockey Hall of Famer
- April 30 – Steven Goldmann, 53, music video director and producer

=== May ===
- May 11 – Alan Borovoy, 83, lawyer and activist
- May 18 – Frank Pierpoint Appleby, 101, politician
- May 31 – Gladys Taylor, 97, writer and newspaper publisher

=== June ===
- June 1 – Jacques Parizeau, 84, politician, Premier of Quebec 1994–1996 (born 1930)
- June 6 – John Coleman Laidlaw, 94, endocrinologist
- June 8 – Archie Alleyne, 82, jazz musician
- June 15 – Jean Doré, 70, politician, 39th Mayor of Montreal
- June 21 – Dave Godfrey, 76, writer and publisher
- June 23 – Domenico Moschella, 67, Montreal City Councillor

=== July ===
- July 7 – Stan Carew, 64, radio broadcaster, musician and actor
- July 16 – Jim Mayne, former leader of the Prince Edward Island New Democratic Party
- July 26 – Flora MacDonald, 85, Canada's first female foreign minister

=== August ===
- August 2 – Phyllis Grosskurth, 91, biographer
- August 4 – Chris Hyndman, 49, television talk show host (Steven and Chris)
- August 14 – Joseph Reid, 97, politician
- August 15 – Derwyn Shea, 77, former Ontario MPP
- August 16 – Joan Fawcett, 78, former Ontario MPP
- August 24 – Marguerite McDonald, 73, CBC radio and television journalist
- August 28 – Al Arbour, ice hockey player, coach and executive, Hockey Hall of Famer
- August 29
  - Graham Leggat, Scottish-Canadian soccer player and manager (b. 1934)
  - Ron Searle, English-Canadian soldier, publisher, and politician, 4th Mayor of Mississauga (b. 1919)

=== October ===
- October 1 – Max Keeping, 73, television news anchor
- October 9 – Ronald Lampman Watts, 86, academic, Companion of the Order of Canada
- October 10 – Wes Funk, 46, novelist

=== November ===
- November 15 – Bert Olmstead, 89, ice hockey player, Hockey Hall of Famer
- November 19 – Ron Hynes, singer-songwriter
- November 20 – Jim Perry, 82, television personality, game show host
- November 23 – Manmeet Bhullar, politician

=== December ===
- December 3 – Bill Bennett, 83, politician, Premier of British Columbia 1975–1986 (born 1932)
- December 19 – Dickie Moore, 84, ice hockey player, two-time winner of Art Ross Trophy and Hockey Hall of Fame
- December 30 – Howard Pawley, 81, politician, Premier of Manitoba 1981–1988 (born 1934)

== See also ==
- 2015 Canadian wildfires
- 2015 in Canadian music
- 2015 in Canadian television
- List of Canadian films of 2015
