= George Karpati =

Canadian neurologist (1934–2009)

- Born: May 17, 1934; Debrecen, Hungary
- Died: February 6, 2009 (aged 74); Montréal
- Awards: Order of Canada; National Order of Quebec

George Karpati, OC CQ FRSC (May 17, 1934 – February 6, 2009) was a Canadian neurologist and neuroscientist who was one of the leading experts on the diagnosis and treatment of neuromuscular disorders including muscular dystrophy research.

Born in Debrecen, Hungary, Karpati was a Holocaust survivor who emigrated to Canada in 1957. He received an M.D. from Dalhousie University in 1960. Karpati spent 30 years in clinical practise, research and teaching of neurology. He was the Izaak Walton Killam Chair and Professor of Neurology at McGill University.

In 1999, he was made a Fellow of the Royal Society of Canada. He was a member of the Hungarian Academy of Sciences. In 2001, he was made an Officer of the Order of Canada for his "seminal contributions in the area of muscular dystrophy". In 2005, he was made a Knight of the National Order of Quebec.

Karpati died on February 6, 2009, aged 74, and was buried in Montreal at the Baron de Hirsch Cemetery.
