= Bob Brady (Canadian football) =

Canadian football player (1931–2018)

Profile
- Positions: Guard, Linebacker

Personal information
- Born: 1931; Sault Ste. Marie, Ontario
- Died: July 25, 2018 (aged 86); British Columbia, Canada
- Listed height: 6 ft 0 in (1.83 m)
- Listed weight: 220 lb (100 kg)

Career history
- 1956–1960: BC Lions
- 1961: Toronto Argonauts

Robert Brady (1931 – July 25, 2018) was a Canadian professional football player who played for the BC Lions and Toronto Argonauts. He played college football at the University of British Columbia. He died in 2018.
