= Ronald Lou-Poy =

Canadian lawyer and academic administrator (1934–2022)

Ronald Lou-Poy, CM, QC
- Ronald Lou-Poy (2004)
- Born: September 25, 1934; Victoria, British Columbia, Canada
- Died: February 9, 2022 (aged 87); Victoria, British Columbia, Canada
- Occupation(s): Lawyer and Queen's Counsel
- Awards: Member of the Order of Canada

Ronald Lou-Poy, CM QC (September 25, 1934 – February 9, 2022) was a Canadian lawyer and community leader. He served as chancellor of the University of Victoria from 2003 to 2008.

== Early life ==
Lou-Poy was born in Victoria, British Columbia, on September 25, 1934. His father worked as a grocer, and Lou-Poy was the third generation of his family to reside in Victoria. He studied at Victoria College (which later became the University of Victoria) and the University of British Columbia, graduating with a Bachelor of Commerce in 1957. He was then accepted into the University of British Columbia Faculty of Law, obtaining a Bachelor of Laws in 1960.

== Career ==
After graduating, Lou-Poy articled with Crease Harman & Company, and was subsequently called to the bar of British Columbia in 1961. He specialized in trusts, wills and estates, corporate and commercial law, as well as real estate and mortgages. He eventually became a senior partner of that law firm.

Lou-Poy first served on the University of Victoria board of governors from 1972 to 1974, and again from 1992 to 1995. He was also a founding director of the university's Innovation and Development Corporation, a commercialization enterprise that introduced ground-breaking technologies to market. He was eventually elected as the ninth chancellor of the University of Victoria, assuming the post in 2003. Two years later, he was elected to a second term by acclamation. During his tenure as chancellor, he officiated over more than 70 convocation ceremonies, during which he handed out over 16,000 degrees, certificates, and diplomas (a total of 25,600 when including those graduating in absentia). He also presented university degrees in Iqaluit to Inuit students enrolled in a special University of Victoria Faculty of Law program, as well as honorary degrees at the Great Hall of the People in Beijing. His family financed the construction of a child care centre at the university and established a scholarship for law students.

== Awards and honours ==
Lou-Poy was appointed Queen's Counsel in December 1989. He was granted an honorary Doctorate of Laws by the University of Victoria (his alma mater) in 2000. Three years later, he was appointed a member of the Order of Canada and invested a year later in October 2004. Lou-Poy was conferred the Leadership Victoria Lifetime Achievement Award in 2007, in recognition of his long-standing service to the local community. He was also presented with a community service award by the Canadian Bar Association. He was part of the inaugural class inducted into the Greater Victoria Chamber of Commerce's Business Hall of Fame in September 2021.

== Personal life ==
Lou-Poy was married to May until his death. Together, they had two children: Anne-Marie and Patrick. He played tennis into his seventies and golf until a few years before his death, having been a member of the Uplands Golf Club.

Lou-Poy died on February 9, 2022, at the age of 87.

Academic offices
Preceded by Norma Mickelson	9th Chancellor of the University of Victoria; 2003–2008	Succeeded by Murray Farmer
