= Élise Paré-Tousignant =

Canadian music pedagogue (1937–2018)

Élise Paré-Tousignant CM OQ
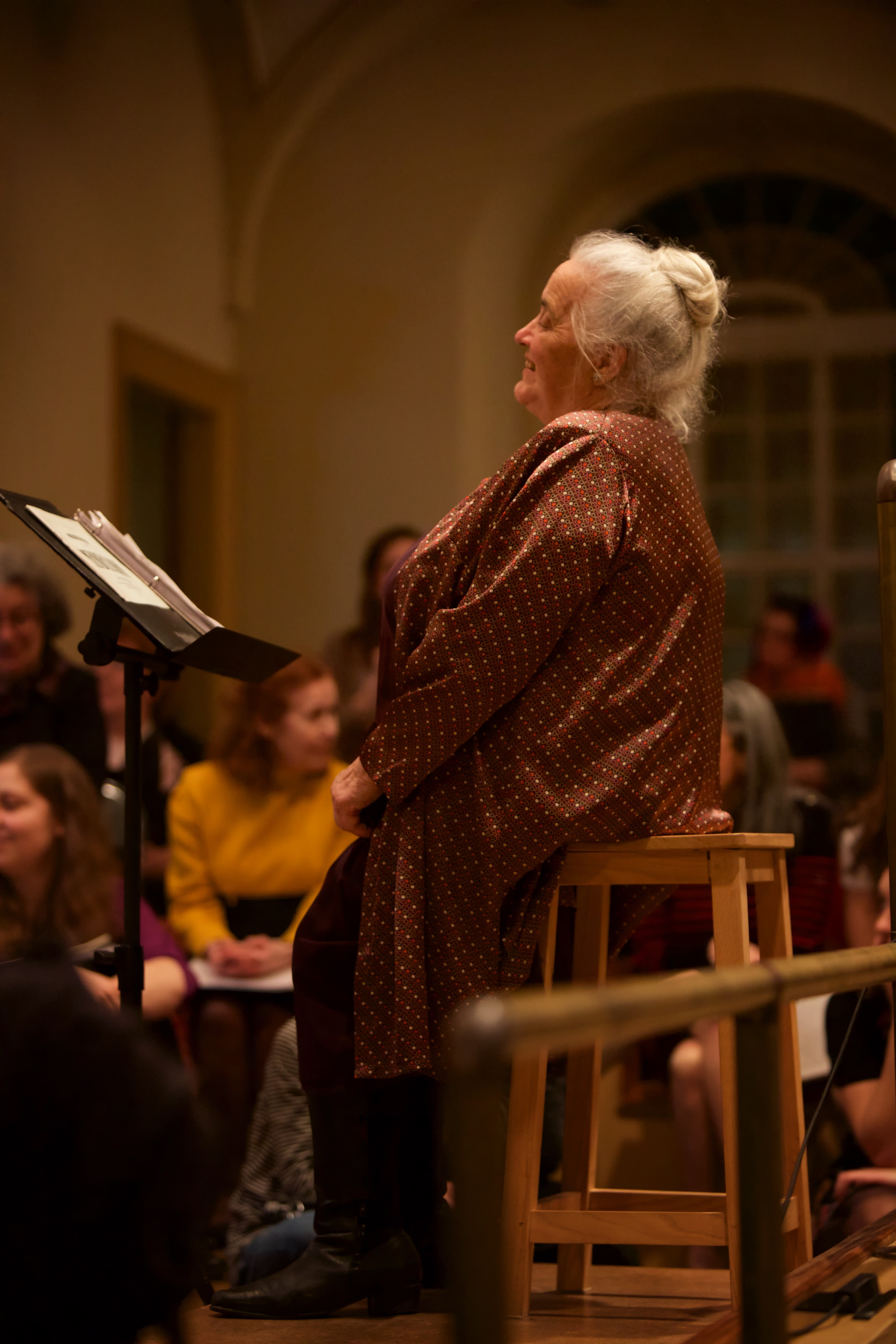
- Paré-Tousignant at work with the Deschambault-Grondines choir.
- Born: 1937; Deschambault-Grondines, Quebec, Canada
- Died: August 8, 2018 (aged 81); Quebec, Canada
- Occupations: Music administrator Music pedagogue
- Years active: 1959–2001
- Spouse: Bernard Tousignant
- Children: 5
- Awards: Médaille Gloire de l'Escolle; Chevalier of the Ordre des Palmes académiques Officer of the National Order of Quebec; Compagne Ordre des arts et des lettres du Québec; Member of the Order of Canada

Élise Paré-Tousignant CM OQ (1937 – August 8, 2018) was a Canadian music administrator and music pedagogue. She was employed as a music theory teacher and auditory trainor at Université Laval and then was appointed the Faculty of Arts at Université Laval's first dean in 1985. Paré-Tousignant was the university's vice-rector of human resources and held the role of artistic director of the Domaine Forget that he held from 1993 to 2001. She oversaw the construction of the Domaine's Françoys-Bernier Hall and was the supervisor of the renovation of the Palais Montcalm. Paré-Tousignant served on the board of directors of the Conseil des arts et des lettres du Québec and was president of the Quebec Music Council between 2001 and 2005. She received awards and decorations such as the Médaille Gloire de l'Escolle, the Chevalier of the Ordre des Palmes académiques, the Officer of the National Order of Quebec, the Tribute Prize at the Prix Opus , the Compagne Ordre des arts et des lettres du Québec in 2015, and the Member of the Order of Canada.

== Biography ==
Born in Deschambault-Grondines, Quebec in 1937, Paré-Tousignant was the daughter of the parish organist Blandine Naud and the teacher Victor Paré. She graduated from Université Laval with a degree in music in 1958 and obtained a fourth degree in music education from the Ward Institute in Paris.

During the year following her graduation in 1959, Paré-Tousignant had her first role in musical education by being on a school board. She enrolled on the Université Laval music school's teacher training program that had earlier introduced a bachelor's degree in music education. Paré-Tousignant became employed in the Faculty of Music at Université Laval as a teacher of music theory and auditory training for baccalaureate students and was one of the first specialists in music to be employed by a school board. She educated such students as Bernard Labadie and Lyne Fortin, organised concerts with the university choir, took part in the formation of the option to study music at Cégep de Sainte-Foy and established the university's lyrical workshop teaching rhythmic arts offered to bachelor's degree music education students.

In 1985, Paré-Tousignant was appointed the first dean of the Faculty of Arts at Université Laval. She became the university's vice-rector of human resources two years later, their first female vice-rector. Paré-Tousignant was also the chair of the Student Affairs Commission. In 1993, she was appointed artistic director of the Domaine Forget by its board of directors following the death of Françoys Bernier. Paré-Tousignant oversaw the construction of the Domaine's concert hall, the Françoys-Bernier Hall, and supervised the renovation of the Palais Montcalm. In 1995, she was one of fifteen commissioners appointed to the Commission for the Estates General on Education by Jean Garon, the Minister of Education for Parti Québécois. She stood down in 2001.

Paré-Tousignant retired from professional work in 1997. In 1992, she began the formation of the l'École de Musique Denys-Arcand. Paré-Tousignant was one of the first 12 individuals to be appointed to the board of directors of the Conseil des arts et des lettres du Québec in August 1993 to work with president Guy Morin, before becoming vice-president of its management committee. She served as president of the Quebec Music Council between 2001 and 2005 and led the Société du palais Montcalm's board of the directors from 2004 to 2008, overseeing the inauguration of its renovated concert hall.

Paré-Tousignant was on the board of directors of various musical organisations, such as the Les Violons du Roy, the Orchestre Symphonique de Québec, the Trident Foundation, the Claude Lavoie Foundation, and the Culture et Patrimoine Deschambault-Grondines, where she had responsibility for their choir. She was a founder member of the Société du Vieux Presbytère that dedicates itself to improving and preserving Deschambault-Grondines's heritage. Paré-Tousignant was a representative for Portneuf region on the board of directors of the Conseil de la culture des régions de Québec et de Chaudière-Appalaches, and was a member of both the Canada Council for the Arts and the Canadian Music Council.

== Personal life and legacy ==
She was married to Bernard Tousignant, and they had five children. She became unwell in July 2018, and died at Hôpital de l'Enfant-Jésus on August 8, 2018. A remembrance service to honor the memory of Paré-Tousignant took place at Église Saint-Joseph de Deschambault on the afternoon of 22 September 2018. Her memory was honored by a concert of the Domaine Forget on June 29, 2019.

== Awards ==
Paré-Tousignant received various awards and decorations throughout her career. In 1998, she was awarded the Médaille Gloire de l'Escolle. Paré-Tousignant was appointed Chevalier of the Ordre des Palmes académiques in 2003 and Officer of the National Order of Quebec in 2006. In January 2011, she received the Tribute Prize at the Prix Opus from her granddaughter. Paré-Tousignant was named Compagne Ordre des arts et des lettres du Québec in 2015, and was appointed a Member of the Order of Canada in May 2017.
