= Stan Kaluznick =

Canadian football player (1931–2017)

Profile
- Position: Fullback

Personal information
- Born: August 2, 1931; Saint Boniface, Manitoba
- Died: May 15, 2017 (aged 85); Calgary, Alberta
- Listed height: 5 ft 8 in (1.73 m)
- Listed weight: 203 lb (92 kg)

Career history
- 1948: Winnipeg Blue Bombers
- 1950–1954: Calgary Stampeders

Stanley William Kaluznick (August 2, 1931 – May 15, 2017) was a professional Canadian football player who played for the Winnipeg Blue Bombers and the Calgary Stampeders.

Kaluznick was born in Saint Boniface, Manitoba and resided in Calgary, Alberta after retiring from the CFL into a business career including the founding of United Mud Supply.
