= Danièle Dorice =

Canadian singer and dance teacher

- Born: Danièle Angers; July 23, 1935; Quebec City, Quebec, Canada
- Died: March 12, 2018 (aged 82); Outremont, Quebec, Canada
- Occupations: Singer; Teacher
- Years active: 1958–2018
- Spouse: William Anton Skerczak
- Children: 1

Danièle Dorice (née Angers; July 23, 1935 – March 12, 2018) was a Canadian singer and teacher of dance, staging and voice. She began her career as a singer in amateur shows in 1958 and went on to tour countries in Europe, the Far East and South America. Dorice also toured for the Canadian Broadcasting Corporation (CBC) performing at Canadian Armed Forces bases across the world and presented television programs on Ici Radio-Canada Télé and CTV Television Network. She also performed on American talk shows and founded the Montreal-based artistic agency Les Productions Danièle Dorice Inc in 1971 before going on to teach there.

== Personal life ==
Dorice was born on July 23, 1935, in Quebec City, Quebec. She was the daughter of Loretta LeClair and Roland Angers and had five siblings, including her sister Denyse Angé who is also a singer. Dorice was married to William Anton Skerczak, with whom she had a daughter. She died on March 12, 2018, from cancer in Outremont, Quebec. Dorice was given a funeral service at Mount Royal Funeral Complex four days later.

== Career ==
While working as a secretary in Quebec City, she began her career working as a singer in amateur shows in 1958, winning the Miss Personality Canada contest and earning her a screen test with The Rank Organisation in London, England. Following that, Dorice made extensive tours of Europe, the Far East, the Orient and South America. Upon returning to Canada in 1963, she performed in multiple cabarets and hotets before going overseas to tour eleven nations, such as France, Japan and the United States. Dorice conducted her first tour for the Canadian Broadcasting Corporation (CBC) in 1965, visiting worldwide bases of the Canadian Armed Forces, so that she could entertain them. In March 1966, her first single was released by Elysée. Dorice presented the television program Comment allez-vous on the Ici Radio-Canada Télé from May 1966 to 1967.

She went on to present the English-language program Le Caf' Conc between 1969 and 1970, on the CTV Television Network affiliate CFCF-TV. On the show, Dorice performed weekly with a cabaret featuring "scantily-clad dancers, live singing, and an appreciative crowd" according to CTV News. She also made guest appearances on multiple programs on television and radio in Canada and the United States. In 1970, Dorice performed on The Tonight Show Starring Johnny Carson and also went on The Carol Burnett Show and The Ed Sullivan Show. She founded the Montreal-based artistic agency Les Productions Danièle Dorice Inc in 1971, and began to administer a music hall school in 1974, where Dorice taught dance, staging and voice. Dorice and her dance group Les Doricettes performed on cruise ships, in hotels in Montreal and in Florida, throughout the 1970s and the 1980s. She recorded the LP Danièle Dorice, la joie de vivre in 1971, and performed at the CBC Showcase '73 in the Saskatchewan Centre of the Arts in May 1973.

== Artistry ==
Dorice was able to perform in nine different languages, including English, French, Greek, Hebrew, Italian, Japanese, Russian and Spanish. Dan Lewis of The Record wrote that she did not speak the letter H in her vocabulary when she did not employ phonetic pronunciations. Lewis also noted Dorice "offers each song with the exuberance of a gay French mademoiselle on a sprightly walk along the banks of the Seine, or along the Champs Elysee" and that there was "typical French warble in her songs".
