= Philip Seeman =

Canadian pharmacologist (1934–2021)

- Born: 8 February 1934; Winnipeg, Manitoba, Canada
- Died: 9 January 2021 (aged 86); Toronto, Ontario, Canada
- Education: Bachelor of Science; Master of Science degree Ph.D. in life sciences
- Alma mater: McGill University; Rockefeller University
- Occupation: Pharmacologist
- Awards: Order of Canada

Philip Seeman, OC FRSC (8 February 1934 – 9 January 2021) was a Canadian schizophrenia researcher and neuropharmacologist, known for his research on dopamine receptors.

== Career ==
Born in Winnipeg, Manitoba, Seeman was raised in Montreal. He received a Bachelor of Science degree, honours physics & physiology (1955), a Master of Science degree, physiology of transport & secretion (1956), and a Doctor of Medicine (1960) from McGill University. In 1966, he received a Ph.D. in life sciences from Rockefeller University under the supervision of George Emil Palade.

In 1967, Seeman became an assistant professor in the Department of Pharmacology at the University of Toronto. In 1970, he was appointed a professor.

In 1974, having spent years in search of the binding site of antipsychotic medication, he discovered the dopamine D2 receptor, the basis for the dopamine hypothesis of schizophrenia. His discoveries also helped advance research on other diseases involving dopamine, such as Parkinson's disease and Huntington's disease.

In 1985, he was made a Fellow of the Royal Society of Canada.

In 2001, he was made an Officer of the Order of Canada "for his research on dopamine receptors and their involvement in diseases such as schizophrenia, Parkinson's and Huntington's".

He was married to Dr. Mary V. Seeman.
