= Murder of Serena McKay =

Canadian murder case

Serena McKay
- Born: Serena Chelsea McKay; September 30, 1997; Winnipeg, Manitoba, Canada
- Died: April 22 or 23, 2017 (aged 19); Sagkeeng First Nation, Manitoba, Canada
- Cause of death: Hypothermia and blunt-force trauma
- Other name: Serenity
- Parents: Delores Daniels (mother); Harvey McKay (father); Roland Mousseau (step-father)

Serena Chelsea "Serenity" McKay (September 30, 1997 – April 22 or 23, 2017) was an Indigenous woman from Manitoba, Canada, whose murder was video recorded and posted on social media—being streamed on Facebook Live, in particular. McKay preferred to go by the name "Serenity".

Her body was found on 23 April 2017 in Sagkeeng First Nation, northeast of Winnipeg, Manitoba. According to CBC News, two videos of the crime circulated, with the longer version sitting on Facebook for four hours on April 26 before it was removed from the site after it was reported. The teenage girls who pleaded guilty to the murder of McKay, their former schoolmate, were aged 16 and 17 at the time of their arrest.

== Biography ==
Serena Chelsea McKay, who preferred to go by the name "Serenity", was born September 30, 1997, to Harvey McKay and Delores Daniels. Her siblings include sister Michelle McKay, and brothers Joshua Daniels, Alexander McKay, and Jonathan McKay.

McKay grew up in Winnipeg, and had spent time in Manitoba's Pine Creek, Peguis, and George Gordon First Nations. Though living in the neighbouring community of Pine Creek First Nation, she attended Sagkeeng Anicinabe High School, where she was in the 12th grade at the time of her death. The school would grant McKay a posthumous diploma at her class' convocation in June 2017, as well as creating a scholarship in her name.

== Murder and video ==
The murder took place on the Sagkeeng First Nation, 100 kilometres (62 mi) northeast of Winnipeg, Manitoba. It is not exactly known whether McKay died on April 22 or April 23: she was last seen on the evening of 22 April 2017 and was reported missing to the RCMP detachment in the neighbouring town of Powerview at 6pm on 23 April; a dead body—later confirmed to be Serena McKay—was found two hours after the missing-person report, at 8pm, in Sagkeeng.

The killing was filmed and posted on social media; the graphic material circulated in both a short and long version on Facebook. The video depicts a bloodied, barely-conscious young woman lying on the ground, as she is repeatedly kicked and punched in the head. In addition to the victim's blood and facial injuries, the longer video also shows her head being stomped on by a heavy boot, as well as the sound of bones cracking, during the assault.

Both female and male voices can be heard in the video, but it is unclear how many people are around her other than two females. During the assault, the victim cries out, "I'm so sorry", though there is no available context as to what she is sorry for or why she is being attacked. A female voice says to the victim, "If you send anyone after me I will kill you. I will fucking kill you myself."

Later in the evening of the murder, the younger suspect sent out a Snapchat photo, covered in blood and smiling, with the caption, "just chilling". According to a supposed instant-message exchange between one of the alleged suspects to a resident of Sagkeeng, she broke the nose of the victim, who subsequently left but was nonetheless "OK" and "up and walking". The suspect also mentioned that the victim's nose was "bleeding lots".

A pathologist testified during the trial of the two suspected killers that McKay likely died of hypothermia, as she was unable to seek protection from the cold due to her injuries and the amount of alcohol in her system. The court also heard that McKay had 67 injuries on her body at the time of death.

=== Circulation of video ===
The video of the murder was circulated in both a short and long version on Facebook, on which the video remained for at least three days before its removal.

The short version of the video was removed after Sagkeeng Grand Chief Derrick Henderson made a request to Facebook, while the long version was removed from the site after CBC News reported it to Facebook and the RCMP. According to CBC, the longer version sat on the site for four hours on April 26 before its removal.

== Suspects and investigation ==
=== Investigation ===
McKay's beaten body was found on April 23 near a home in Sagkeeng, two hours after she was reported missing. Sagkeeng resident Alma Kakikepinace was among the first to discover McKay's body. Two teenagers (aged 16 and 17, respectively, at the time) were subsequently arrested.

The online video was brought to the attention of McKay's high-school principal, Claude Guimond, by her classmates on April 24, the day after McKay's body was found. Upon seeing the face of the victim, Guimond believed it to be McKay and forwarded the evidence to Powerview RCMP. Also that day, the younger suspect (16) spoke to a school counsellor about the beating and later turned herself into the RCMP.

One of the suspects was also accused of writing instant messages (IM) about the death. The Winnipeg Free Press reported that it received an IM exchange from “a resident of the reserve” in which one of the alleged suspects writes at first, “We fought, I broke her nose then that happened, she left after, she was OK. She was up and walking.” A few hours later, the suspect wrote, “She was found dead bro… Promise me say when we fought it wasn’t that bad. Her nose was just bleeding lots… I’m fuckin scared. Promise me, you won’t tell em I fought her deadly. Please bro… Say after we closed the door, she left.”

On the week of 1 May 2017, the RCMP ruled the death to be a homicide, charging the two girls with second-degree murder. While it is known that the two girls went to school with McKay, the Canadian Youth Criminal Justice Act prohibits releasing names of accused or convicted youth-criminals, and the suspects' names cannot be revealed publicly.

=== Trial and detention ===
A pathologist testified during their trial that McKay likely died of hypothermia, unable to seek protection from the cold because of her injuries and the amount of alcohol in her system. The two girls were charged with, and pleaded guilty to, second-degree murder, and were ordered to undergo a psychological assessment. Following their guilty pleas, prosecutors had also tried to seek adult sentences for the teenage girls, arguing that a youth sentence (maximum of 3 years) would be too lenient.

In January 2018, the younger of the two suspects, 17 years old at this time, was subject to sentencing hearings at Winnipeg youth court, where she pleaded guilty to manslaughter. According to her defence lawyer, she was a "panicked young person" and thus should be sentenced as a youth.

The older of the two, 17 years old at the time of arrest, was remanded to the Manitoba Youth Center (MYC)—a youth prison which has both remand, post remand, and convict units—and subsequently pleaded guilty to the charge. On 26 May 2017, the 17-year-old suspect had her first trial at a Manitoba Provincial Court in Winnipeg, where both the defense lawyers and prosecutors requested a psychological test. Crown prosecutor Jennifer Comack said there were 24 victim impact statements from family and friends, in addition to those from people who did not know McKay. Provincial court Judge Rocky Pollack sentenced her in June 2018 to 40 months (3 years & 4 months) in prison followed by another 23.5 months (1 year & 11 months) of conditional supervision—the maximum youth sentence in Canada for taking a life. One condition of her sentence was that the two girls are not allowed to communicate with one another while the sentence is being served. The girl has since claimed that she is very sorry for what she has done.

In November 2020, the older suspect, now 20 years old, was moved to Women's Correctional Centre, an adult facility in Headingley. Also that year, she was denied a request for an early release so that she could return to her First Nation community and take steps to enrol at the University of Manitoba. Judge Pollack rejected the request in a written decision on August 26, saying that the woman "still does not appreciate the significance of her consequences". Some reasons include: forging the signature of a MYC staff member in order to get a letter released in the mail; tattooing herself; her involvement with a group that refused to comply with lockup orders; and getting disciplined for not taking medication.

In a handwritten document by the woman, called "My Life Story", she wrote about the night of the murder:

A couple drinks turned into a full weekend of binge drinking. Waking up a Monday, and finding out you were involved in a murder was so shocking. I couldn't remember much of that weekend but watching a video a friend showed me was brutal. I sat back and denied it all because I'm not a violent person.

== Mourning and impact ==
On April 25, McKay's school, Sagkeeng Anicinabe High School, held a healing ceremony for students and staff, which councillors were brought in to assist with.

A vigil was held in Sagkeeng's powwow grounds at 7 pm on April 27, following a singing and drumming circle. Another vigil was held on April 29, this time in Winnipeg, with hundreds marching. The vigil began at 6:30pm at Winnipeg's Thunderbird House, where people gathered for drumming and singing. From there, the Bear Clan Patrol led the group down Waterfront Drive to Oodena Circle at The Forks, where the vigil wrapped up with drumming and donated tobacco and refreshments.

McKay's funeral was held at Westwood Church in Winnipeg on 1 May 2017; she was buried in the city as well.

On 23 June 2017, at Sagkeeng Anicinabe High School's graduation ceremony, what would have been McKay's seat was left empty and marked with a red graduation gown and diploma to honour her memory. The school granted McKay a posthumous diploma at the ceremony, as well as creating a scholarship in her name.

In February 2018, about 20 people, including McKay's family and friends, gathered in front of the Manitoba Legislative Building to protest the perpetrators' reduced sentences. Starting at the Legislature, the protesters walked up Memorial Boulevard and through part of downtown. The previous month, McKay's mother spoke at the second annual Women's March in Winnipeg.

== See also ==
- Law, government, and crime in Winnipeg
- List of solved missing person cases (2010s)
- Manitoba Justice
- Missing and murdered Indigenous women
  - Tina Fontaine
