= Hugh Edwin Munroe =

Canadian politician

The Honourable Hugh Edwin Munroe OBE
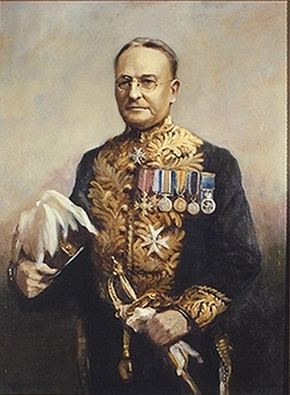
- Hugh Edwin Munroe during his time as Lieutenant Governor of Saskatchewan.

5th Lieutenant Governor of Saskatchewan
- In office March 31, 1931 – September 10, 1936
- Monarchs: George V Edward VIII
- Governors General: The Earl of Willingdon; The Earl of Bessborough; The Lord Tweedsmuir
- Premier: J.T.M. Anderson; James G. Gardiner; William John Patterson
- Preceded by: Henry William Newlands
- Succeeded by: Archibald Peter McNab

Personal details
- Born: May 31, 1878 Glengarry County, Ontario
- Died: March 12, 1947 (aged 68) Florida, U.S.
- Party: Conservative
- Other political affiliations: Provincial Rights Party
- Education: McGill University, University of Edinburgh
- Occupation: Physician
- Profession: Politician

Hugh Edwin Munroe OBE (May 31, 1878 – March 12, 1947) was the fifth lieutenant governor of Saskatchewan during the Great Depression.

He was born in Glengarry County, Ontario and educated at McGill University where he earned his medical degree before undertaking post-graduate studies at the University of Edinburgh.

Munroe subsequently settled in Saskatchewan where he established his medical practice. He was involved in local and provincial politics - he was defeated as a candidate for the Provincial Rights Party in the 1905 provincial election when he was a candidate in Saskatoon County. In the 1912 provincial election he ran as the Conservative candidate in Saskatoon City but was again defeated.

He served in World War I as a lieutenant colonel and was appointed Officer of the Most Excellent Order of the British Empire for his military service.

He returned to Saskatchewan after the war and resumed his medical practice and political activity. He was appointed lieutenant governor of the province by Conservative federal Prime Minister R.B. Bennett in 1931.

In the midst of the economic crisis, Munroe used his office to raise money for relief projects and charity. Nevertheless, many Canadians viewed the ceremonial office as a frivolity and excess during times of hardship and there was a movement to abolish the position. However, the provincial Legislature overwhelmingly defeated a motion to suspend the Office of the Lieutenant-Governor in 1934.

Munroe retired from office in 1936.
