= Frank Fagan =

Canadian businessman and dignitary

The Honourable Frank Fagan CM ONL
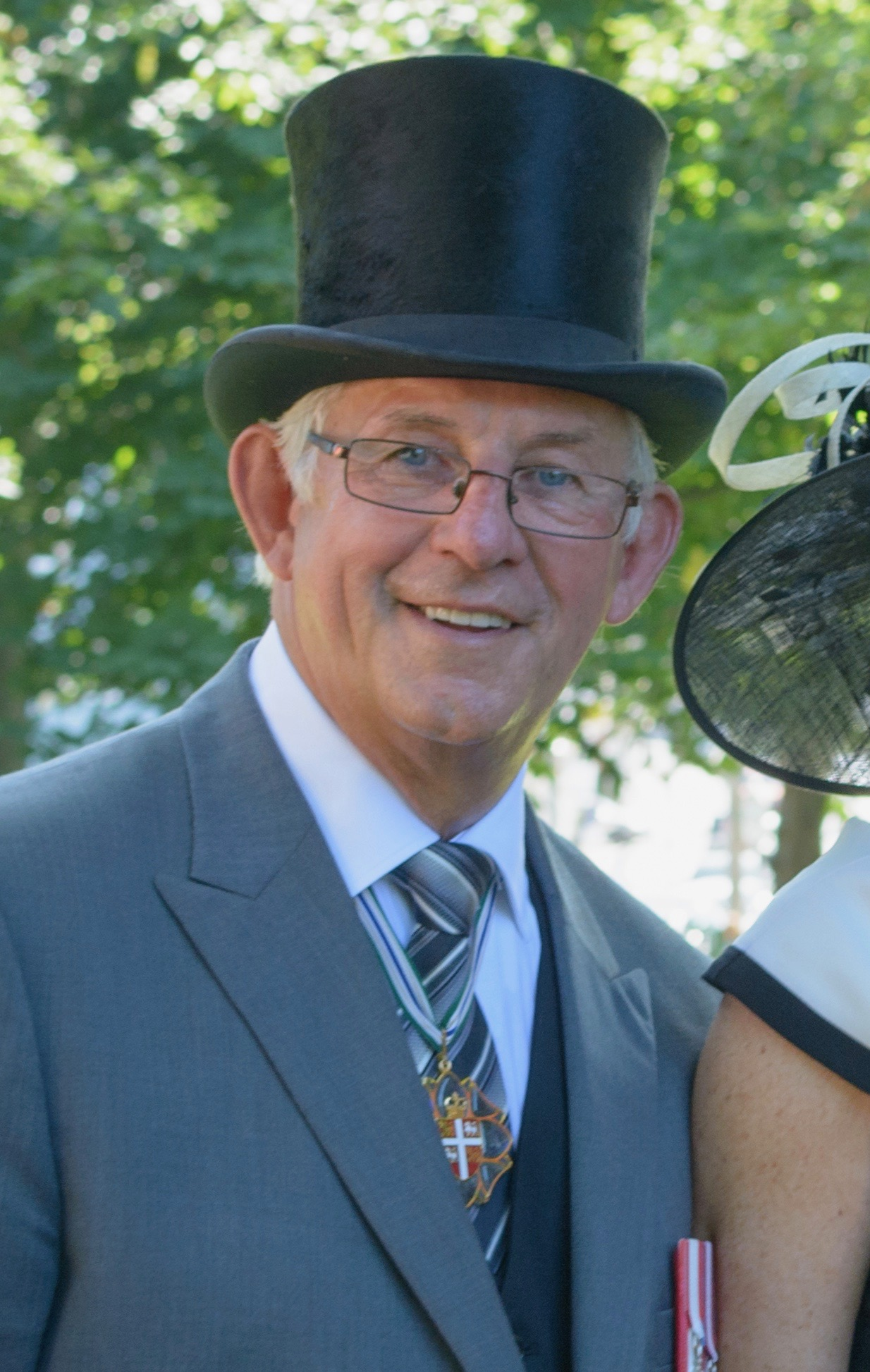
- Fagan in 2014

13th Lieutenant Governor of Newfoundland and Labrador
- In office 19 March 2013 – 3 May 2018
- Monarch: Elizabeth II
- Governors General: David Johnston; Julie Payette
- Premier: Kathy Dunderdale; Tom Marshall; Paul Davis; Dwight Ball
- Preceded by: John Crosbie
- Succeeded by: Judy Foote

Personal details
- Born: Frank Frederick Fagan c. 1944 (age 81–82) Kelligrews, Dominion of Newfoundland
- Spouse: Mary Patricia Fagan
- Children: 3
- Education: Memorial University of Newfoundland
- Occupation: Businessman, Philanthropist

Frank Frederick Fagan, CM ONL (born c. 1944) is a Canadian businessman and dignitary, who served as the 13th lieutenant governor of Newfoundland and Labrador from 2013 to 2018, thus serving as the viceregal representative of Queen Elizabeth II of Canada in the Province of Newfoundland and Labrador. He was appointed by Governor General of Canada David Lloyd Johnston on the advice of Prime Minister Stephen Harper on 2 February 2013. Fagan was sworn in on 19 March 2013, succeeding John Crosbie.

A telecommunications executive with Bell Aliant, Fagan retired in 2008. He received a Bachelor of Arts degree in 1979 and a Masters of Business Administration in 1982 from Memorial University of Newfoundland.

In 2011, Fagan was made a Member of the Order of Canada "for his contributions as a volunteer, community leader and philanthropist." He was invested as Chancellor of the Order of Newfoundland and Labrador upon his appointment as Lieutenant Governor.

His term of office came to the end on May 3, 2018.

== Coat of arms ==
Fagan was granted the following armorial bearings in April 2015:

Coat of arms of Frank Fagan

Crest
Issuant from an ancient crown Or a raven rising Sable
Escutcheon
Barry dancetty Argent and Azure a tree eradicated issuant from a rock Or
Supporters
Two lion-beavers Or and Azure each grasping a rod of Aesculapius Sable its serpent Or and standing on a rocky mount proper strewn with pitcher plants Or
Motto
SEMPER SUMERE DIEM
