= 2014 in Canada =

- Decades: 1990s; 2000s; 2010s; 2020s
- See also: History of Canada; Timeline of Canadian history; List of years in Canada

Events from the year 2014 in Canada.

== Incumbents ==
=== Crown ===
- Monarch – Elizabeth II

=== Federal government ===
- Governor General – David Johnston
- Prime Minister – Stephen Harper
- Chief Justice – Beverley McLachlin (British Columbia)
- Parliament – 41st

=== Provincial governments ===
==== Lieutenant governors ====
- Lieutenant Governor of Alberta – Donald Ethell
- Lieutenant Governor of British Columbia – Judith Guichon
- Lieutenant Governor of Manitoba – Philip S. Lee
- Lieutenant Governor of New Brunswick – Graydon Nicholas (until October 23), Jocelyne Roy-Vienneau
- Lieutenant Governor of Newfoundland and Labrador – Frank Fagan
- Lieutenant Governor of Nova Scotia – John James Grant
- Lieutenant Governor of Ontario – David Onley (until September 23) then Elizabeth Dowdeswell
- Lieutenant Governor of Prince Edward Island – Frank Lewis
- Lieutenant Governor of Quebec – Pierre Duchesne
- Lieutenant Governor of Saskatchewan – Vaughn Solomon Schofield

==== Premiers ====
- Premier of Alberta – Alison Redford (until March 23), Dave Hancock (March 23 to September 15) then Jim Prentice
- Premier of British Columbia – Christy Clark
- Premier of Manitoba – Greg Selinger
- Premier of New Brunswick – David Alward (until October 7) then Brian Gallant
- Premier of Newfoundland and Labrador – Kathy Dunderdale (until January 24), Tom Marshall (January 24 to September 26) then Paul Davis
- Premier of Nova Scotia – Stephen McNeil
- Premier of Ontario – Kathleen Wynne
- Premier of Prince Edward Island – Robert Ghiz
- Premier of Quebec – Pauline Marois (until April 23) then Philippe Couillard
- Premier of Saskatchewan – Brad Wall

=== Territorial governments ===
==== Commissioners ====
- Commissioner of Yukon – Doug Phillips
- Commissioner of Northwest Territories – George Tuccaro
- Commissioner of Nunavut – Edna Elias

==== Premiers ====
- Premier of the Northwest Territories – Bob McLeod
- Premier of Nunavut – Peter Taptuna
- Premier of Yukon – Darrell Pasloski

== Events ==
=== January to March ===
- January 1 – Hobbema, Alberta, is renamed Maskwacis.
- January 5 – The centennial celebrations of Amos, Quebec, begin.
- January 8 – A Canadian National Railway train from Toronto carrying crude oil and propane derails and catches fire in Plaster Rock, New Brunswick, in the northwest part of the province, causing 45 homes to be evacuated in a rural area. No one was injured, and the fire was extinguished without the propane exploding.
- January 17 – Brian Jean, the Conservative MP for Fort McMurray—Athabasca, resigns his seat.
- January 23 – The L'Isle-Verte nursing home fire kills several people.
- January 24 – Kathy Dunderdale resigns as Premier of Newfoundland and Labrador, as interim leader of the Progressive Conservative Party of Newfoundland and Labrador Tom Marshall is sworn in as Premier.
- January 29 – Singer Justin Bieber surrenders to Toronto Police to face assault charges.
- February 12 – Two teenagers age 17 are accused of premeditated murder of two women and a man in Trois-Rivières.
- February 28 – Two are killed and six are injured in a stabbing rampage at a Loblaw grocery warehouse in Edmonton, Alberta.
- March 9 – 2nd Canadian Screen Awards in Toronto
- March 12 – Olivia Chow, the NDP MP for Trinity—Spadina and widow of Jack Layton, resigns her seat to run in the 2014 Toronto mayoral election.
- March 18 – Jim Flaherty, the Conservative MP for Whitby-Oshawa, resigns as finance minister to return to the private sector. He remains a backbench MP.
- March 23 – Alison Redford resigns as premier of Alberta. Deputy Premier and Edmonton-Whitemud MLA Dave Hancock is sworn in as premier.
- March 30 – Juno Awards of 2014 in Winnipeg

=== April to June ===
- April 1 – Jim Karygiannis, the Liberal MP for Scarborough—Agincourt, resigns his seat to enter Toronto municipal politics.
- April 7 – In a Quebec general election the Parti Québécois loses its minority to a Quebec Liberal Party majority.
- April 10 – Former Finance Minister Jim Flaherty dies at age 64.
- April 15 – Five students are murdered at an end-of-semester university house party in Calgary; the person charged in the crime is the son of a high ranking city police officer.
- April 23 –
  - Philippe Couillard is sworn in as premier of Quebec.
  - A 6.6 magnitude earthquake hits 94 km south of Port Hardy in British Columbia at around 8:10 pm PDT. Seismic activity was felt as far as Kamloops.
- April 30 –
  - A shooting occurs at a sawmill in Nanaimo, British Columbia, Canada, killing two people and injuring two others. A former employee is arrested.
  - The Mayor of Toronto Rob Ford takes a leave of absence to help with substance abuse, according to his lawyer.
- June 4 – A police manhunt occurs in Moncton, New Brunswick, after the deaths of three RCMP officers.
- June 6 – Montcalm MP Manon Perreault is suspended from the NDP caucus following allegations she misled police.
- June 12 – In an Ontario general election the Ontario Liberal Party gain a majority.
- June 14 – At a Bloc Québécois leadership election Mario Beaulieu is elected leader.
- June 17 – A tornado hits southern Ontario causing extensive damage in the corridor from Angus to Barrie.
- June 30 –
  - Federal by-elections in Fort McMurray—Athabasca, Alberta, Macleod, Alberta, Scarborough—Agincourt, Ontario and Trinity—Spadina, Ontario
  - 3 people are abducted and murdered from their home in Calgary

=== July to September ===
- August 23 to 31 – Arpad Horvath becomes the last victim of serial killer nurse Elizabeth Wettlaufer after being murdered in London, Ontario. Wettlaufer killed her patients by injecting them with fatal doses of insulin.
- August 26 – Fast food giant Burger King agrees to acquire Canadian coffee giant Tim Hortons for $11.4 billion and move its headquarters to Canada.
- August 28 – A tour bus crashes near Merritt, British Columbia. 56 people were injured in the incident.
- August 31 contracts for Ontario teachers and education workers expires
- September 4 – The Canadian government announced that it would deploy up to 100 Canadian special forces to Iraq in a non-combat advisory role. This was Canada first roll in the United States led Operation Inherent Resolve. Operation Impact is Canada's contribution to the military intervention against the Islamic State of Iraq and the Levant.
- September 6 – Jim Prentice is elected leader of the Progressive Conservative Association of Alberta.
- September 15 – Dave Hancock resigns as premier of Alberta and is replaced by Jim Prentice.
- September 17 – Rob Merrifield, the Conservative MP for Yellowhead, resigns his seat to accept an appointment from Alberta Premier Jim Prentice as the province's envoy to the United States.
- September 22 – 2014 New Brunswick general election
- September 26 – Tom Marshall resigns as premier of Newfoundland and Labrador and is replaced by Paul Davis.

=== October to December ===
- October 3 – Canada's role in the intervention increased when Canadian Prime Minister Stephen Harper announced that Canada would be deploying 9 total aircraft, including 6 combat aircraft to Iraq. Steven Harper also did not rule out Canadian involvement in the American-led intervention in Syria
- October 7 – David Alward resigns as premier of New Brunswick and is replaced by Brian Gallant.
- October 18 – Rachel Notley is elected as the new leader of the Alberta New Democratic Party.
- October 19 – Jean-Paul St. Pierre, the incumbent mayor of Russell, dies in office, necessitating a by-election to be held in three months. The township's regular council election will proceed normally on October 27, with only the mayoral election delayed.
- October 20 – Martin Rouleau, a radical Islamist and convert to Islam, ran over two members of the Canadian Armed Forces in Saint-Jean-sur-Richelieu, killing one of them. He was then pursued in a car chase which resulted in a crash. Rouleau died after being shot by police.
- October 21 – Repentigny MP Jean-François Larose leaves the NDP caucus to, along with independent Haute-Gaspésie—La Mitis—Matane—Matapédia MP Jean-François Fortin, form Strength in Democracy, a new Quebec-centred political party.
- October 22 –
  - In the shootings at Parliament Hill, a gunman shot a Canadian Forces soldier dead at the National War Memorial in Ottawa, then entered the Parliament buildings where he was killed by security forces. Ottawa's downtown core was put under lockdown during the search for a potential second shooter.
  - A motorist along the Ingraham Trail on the outskirts of Yellowknife sees Atsumi Yoshikubo, a visiting Japanese tourist, walking north in an undeveloped area of bush. It turns out to be the last time anyone sees her; after an intensive week-long search covered both nationally and in Japan the RCMP announces that its investigation has found she deliberately went missing to end her life.
- October 27 – John Tory is elected 65th mayor of Toronto.
- November 2 – Canadian airstrikes in Iraq began.
- November 5 –
  - Avalon MP Scott Andrews and Saint-Leonard—Saint-Michel MP Massimo Pacetti are suspended from the Liberal caucus following allegations of sexual harassment.
  - Dean Del Mastro, the independent MP for Peterborough, resigns his seat after being found guilty on three counts of violating election spending limits. Prior to Del Mastro's resignation, the House of Commons was expected to vote in favour of an NDP proposal to suspend Del Mastro without pay, effective immediately.
- November 17 – Federal by-elections are held in Whitby—Oshawa and Yellowhead. The Conservatives hold both ridings, under candidates Pat Perkins and Jim Eglinski respectively.
- December 1 - John Tory is sworn in as the 65th mayor of Toronto.
- December 10 – Perry Bellegarde is elected national chief of the Assembly of First Nations.
- December 23 – Luka Magnotta is convicted of the murder of Jun Lin in Montreal. Magnotta recorded and uploaded a video of Lin's murder, dismemberment and necrophilic acts, and later mailed Lin's hands and feet to elementary schools and federal political party offices. He received a mandatory life sentence for the murder and a further 19 years for four other charges.
- December 29 – A man kills eight people in Edmonton, then commits suicide in Fort Saskatchewan, Alberta.

== Sport ==
- January 9 to 15 – 2014 Canadian Figure Skating Championships – Ottawa, Ontario
- January 18 to 26 – 2014 Canadian Junior Curling Championships – Liverpool, Nova Scotia
- January 25 – Jean Pascal vs. Lucian Bute – Montreal, Quebec
- February 1 to 9 – 2014 Scotties Tournament of Hearts – Montreal, Quebec
- February 7 to 23 – Canada at the 2014 Winter Olympics in Sochi, Russia
- February 20 – Canada's women's hockey team wins the Olympic gold medal, beating the American team 3–2.
- March 2 – 2014 Heritage Classic – Vancouver, British Columbia
- March 1 to 9 – 2014 Tim Hortons Brier – Kamloops, British Columbia
- March 7 to 16 – Canada at the 2014 Winter Paralympics in Sochi, Russia
- March 15 to 23 – 2014 Ford World Women's Curling Championship – Saint John, New Brunswick
- May 13 – 2014 CFL draft
- May 25 – The Edmonton Oil Kings win their first Memorial Cup by defeating the Guelph Storm 6 to 3. The tournament was played at Budweiser Gardens in London, Ontario
- June 8 – 2014 Canadian Grand Prix – Montreal, Quebec
- June 13 – Cobourg, Ontario's Justin Williams of the Los Angeles Kings is awarded the Conn Smythe Trophy
- July 21 to 27 – Canadian Open – L'Île-Bizard, Quebec
- July 23 to August 3 – Canada at the 2014 Commonwealth Games in Glasgow, Scotland
- August 5 to 24 – 2014 FIFA U-20 Women's World Cup in Edmonton, Moncton, Montreal, and Toronto
- November 29 – The Montreal Carabins win their first Vanier Cup by defeating the McMaster Marauders 20 to 19 in the 50th Vanier Cup played at Molson Stadium in Montreal
- November 30 – The Calgary Stampeders win their seventh Grey Cup by defeating the Hamilton Tiger-Cats 20 to 16 in the 102nd Grey Cup played at BC Place in Vancouver
- December 1 to 6 – 2014 Women's World Team Squash Championships – Niagara-on-the-Lake, Ontario
- December 26 to January 5, 2015 – 2015 World Junior Ice Hockey Championships – Toronto and Montreal

== Arts and literature ==
- March 6 – Joseph Boyden's novel The Orenda wins the 2014 edition of Canada Reads
- March 10 – Thomas King wins the RBC Taylor Prize for The Inconvenient Indian
- April 22 – The Writers' Trust of Canada announces the new Latner Writers' Trust Poetry Prize.
- April 24 – Bill Conall wins the Stephen Leacock Award for The Promised Land.
- June 23 – Tamai Kobayashi wins the Dayne Ogilvie Prize.
- September 22 – Tanya Tagaq wins the 2014 Polaris Music Prize for her album Animism.
- October 14 – Naomi Klein wins the Hilary Weston Writers' Trust Prize for Nonfiction for This Changes Everything: Capitalism vs. the Climate.
- November 4 – Miriam Toews wins the Rogers Writers' Trust Fiction Prize for All My Puny Sorrows, and Ken Babstock wins the Latner Writers' Trust Poetry Prize.
- November 10 – Sean Michaels wins the Scotiabank Giller Prize for Us Conductors.
- November 13 – Winners of the 2014 Governor General's Awards include Thomas King's The Back of the Turtle for English fiction and Andrée A. Michaud's Bondrée for French fiction.

== Deaths in 2014 ==
=== January ===
- January 6 –
  - Larry D. Mann, 91, actor (Gunsmoke, Hill Street Blues, Rudolph the Red-Nosed Reindeer) (born 1922).
  - Don Ward, 78, ice hockey player (born 1935).
- January 12 – William Feindel, 95, neurosurgeon (born 1918).
- January 14 –
  - Pierre F. Brault, 74, composer (born 1939).
  - Bernie Morelli, 70, politician, Hamilton, Ontario City Councillor (since 1991) (born 1943).
  - Eric Paterson, 84, Olympic champion ice hockey player (1952) (born 1929).
- January 16 – Dave Madden, 82, actor (The Partridge Family) (born 1931).
- January 17
  - Francine Lalonde, 73, politician, MP of Mercier (1993–2004) and La Pointe-de-l'Île (2004–2011)
  - Sunanda Pushkar, 51, Indian-born businesswoman and entrepreneur, drug overdose (born 1962). (body discovered on this date)
- January 18 – Gertrude Story, 84, writer and broadcaster (born 1929)
- January 19
  - Tim Jones, 57, advanced Life Support Paramedic and Search and Rescue Technician (born 1956)
  - Udo Kasemets, 94, Estonian-born composer (born 1919).
- January 20 – George Scott, 84, Scottish-born wrestler, lung cancer (born 1929).
- January 22 – Pierre Jalbert, 89, actor (Combat!) and skier, heart attack (born 1925).
- January 23 – Wando, 14, thoroughbred racehorse (born 1999 or 2000)
- January 25 – John Robertson, 79, journalist (born 1934).
- January 26 – Doris Witiuk, 84, All-American Girls Professional Baseball League (born 1929)
- January 28
  - John Bothwell, 87, Anglican bishop (born 1926).
  - Fernand Leduc, 97, abstract painter, cancer (born 1916).
- January 29
  - Zoe MacKinnon, 55, Olympic field hockey player (1984), cancer (born 1958).
  - Jack Stoddard, 87, ice hockey player (New York Rangers) (born 1926).
- January 30
  - Campbell Lane, 78, actor (born 1935).
  - Cornelius Pasichny, 86, Ukrainian Catholic hierarch, Bishop of Saskatoon (1996–1998) and Toronto (1998–2003) (born 1927).

=== February ===
- February 2 – Yves Ryan, 85, politician, Mayor of Montreal North (1963–2001), heart disease (born 1928).
- February 4
  - Keith Allen, 90, ice hockey player and executive (Philadelphia Flyers), dementia (born 1923).
  - Ed McKitka, 75, politician, Mayor of Surrey, British Columbia (1975–1977), traffic collision (born 1938 or 1939).
- February 7 – Doug Mohns, 80, ice hockey player (Boston Bruins, Chicago Black Hawks) (born 1933).
- February 10 – Doug Jarrett, 69, ice hockey player (Chicago Blackhawks, New York Rangers), cancer (born 1944).
- February 11 –
  - Aslan, 83, French-born painter, sculptor and pin-up artist (born 1930)
  - Peter Desbarats, 80, journalist and Global News anchor (born 1933).
- February 14 – Chris Pearson, 82, politician, Premier of Yukon (1978–1985) (born 1931).
- February 12 – Jean-Louis Giasson, 74, Canadian-born Roman Catholic prelate, Bishop of Yoro (2005–2014) (born 1939).
- February 17 –
  - Joe Bell, 90, ice hockey player (New York Rangers) (born 1923).
  - Ian Kagedan, 58, public servant (born 1955).
- February 18 – Mavis Gallant, 91, writer (born 1922)
- February 23 – K. Alison Clarke-Stewart, 70, developmental psychologist (born 1943).
- February 24 – Neil Harrison, 64, Hall of Fame curler, world champion (1983, 1990) (born 1949).
- February 25 – Angèle Arsenault, 70, singer-songwriter, cancer (born 1943).
- February 26 –
  - Sorel Etrog, 80, Romanian-born sculptor, recipient of the Order of Canada (1994) (born 1933).
  - Georges Hamel, 66, country music singer and songwriter (born 1948).
- February 27 – Assad Kotaite, 89, Lebanese-born administrator, Secretary-General and Council President of the International Civil Aviation Organization (1976–2006) (born 1924).
- February 28 – Lee Lorch, 98, American-born desegregation activist (born 1915).

=== March ===
- March 1 –
  - Nancy Charest, 54, politician, Quebec MNA for Matane (2003–2007) (born 1959).
  - Andy Gilpin, 93, Olympic champion ice hockey player (1948) (born 1920).
- March 2 –
  - Molly Bobak, 92, war artist, recipient of the Order of Canada (1995) (born 1922).
  - Gail Gilmore, 76, actress, lung cancer (born 1937).
  - Scott Vanstone, 66, cryptographer (born 1947).
- March 5 – Alexander Macdonald, 95, politician, MP (1957–1958) (born 1918).
- March 6 – Ron Murphy, 80, ice hockey player (New York Rangers, Chicago Black Hawks, Detroit Red Wings, Boston Bruins) (born 1933).
- March 12 – John Cullen Nugent, 93, artist, sculptor and photographer (born 1921).
- March 13 – Bill Ballard, 67, concert promoter and sport franchise owner (Toronto Maple Leafs), cancer (born 1946).
- March 14 – Hans Fogh, 76, Danish-born Olympic sailor (born 1938).
- March 16
  - Al Oeming, 88, conservationist and television personality (Al Oeming – Man of the North), complications from heart surgery (born 1925 or 1926).
  - Chuck Scherza, 91, ice hockey player (Boston Bruins, New York Rangers) (born 1923).
- March 18 – Jeffrey Anderson, 85, broadcaster, journalist and producer, CBC London bureau chief (born 1928).
- March 19 –
  - Heather Robertson, 72, journalist (Winnipeg Free Press) and author, cancer (born 1942).
  - Lawrence Walsh, 102, lawyer and judge (born 1912).
- March 20 – Marc-Adélard Tremblay, 91, anthropologist (born 1922).
- March 23 –
  - Dave Brockie, 50, heavy metal singer (Gwar) (born 1963).
  - Bobby Croft, 68, basketball player (Kentucky Colonels, Texas Chaparrals), first Canadian to get a full scholarship to NCAA school for basketball (born 1946).
- March 25
  - Jon Lord, 57, politician, Alberta MLA for Calgary-Currie (2001–2004), heart attack (born 1956).
  - Bill Merritt, 66, rock bassist and festival director, director of the Winnipeg Folk Festival, co-founder of the Winnipeg International Children's Festival, cancer (born 1947).
- March 27 – Kent Cochrane, 62, amnesiac, had one of the most studied human brains (born 1951).
- March 29 – Dave Gregg, 54, punk guitarist (D.O.A.), heart attack (born 1960).

=== April ===
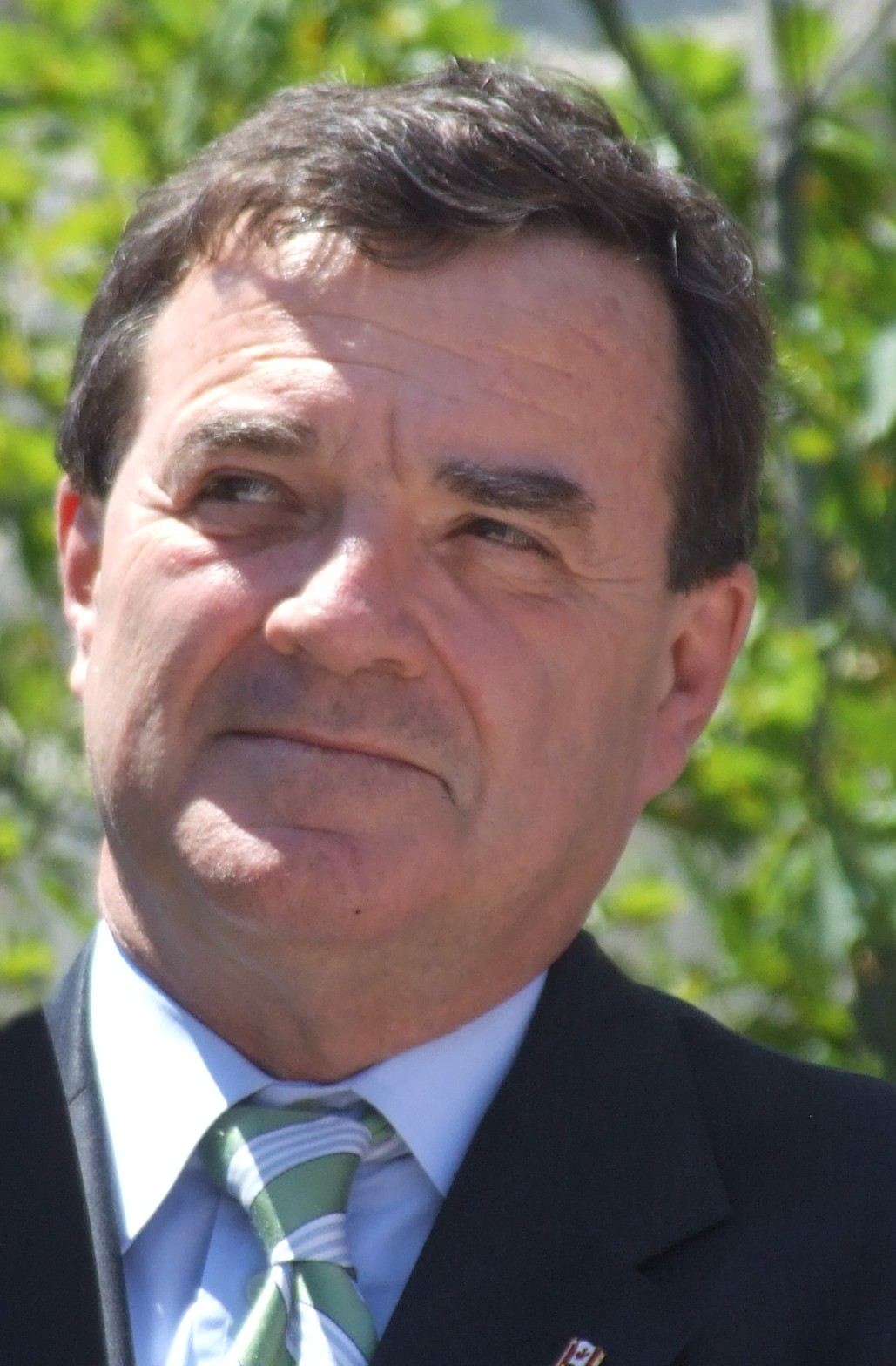
Jim Flaherty

- April 1 – William Mitchell, 85, hockey player (Detroit Red Wings), kidney failure (born 1930).
- April 2
  - Michael Pearse Lacey, 97, Roman Catholic prelate, Auxiliary Bishop of Toronto (1979–1993) (born 1916).
  - Norman Warner, 70, politician and insurance broker, cancer (born 1943).
- April 3 – Bernard Daines, 69, computer engineer and technology executive (born 1945 or 1944).
- April 7 – Noel Knockwood, 81, Mi'kmaq spiritual leader and civil servant, Sergeant-at-Arms for Legislative Assembly of Nova Scotia (2000–2005), National Aboriginal Achievement Award (2002), stroke (born 1932).
- April 10 – Jim Flaherty, 64, Finance Minister (born 1949)
- April 20 – Alistair MacLeod, writer (born 1936)

=== May ===
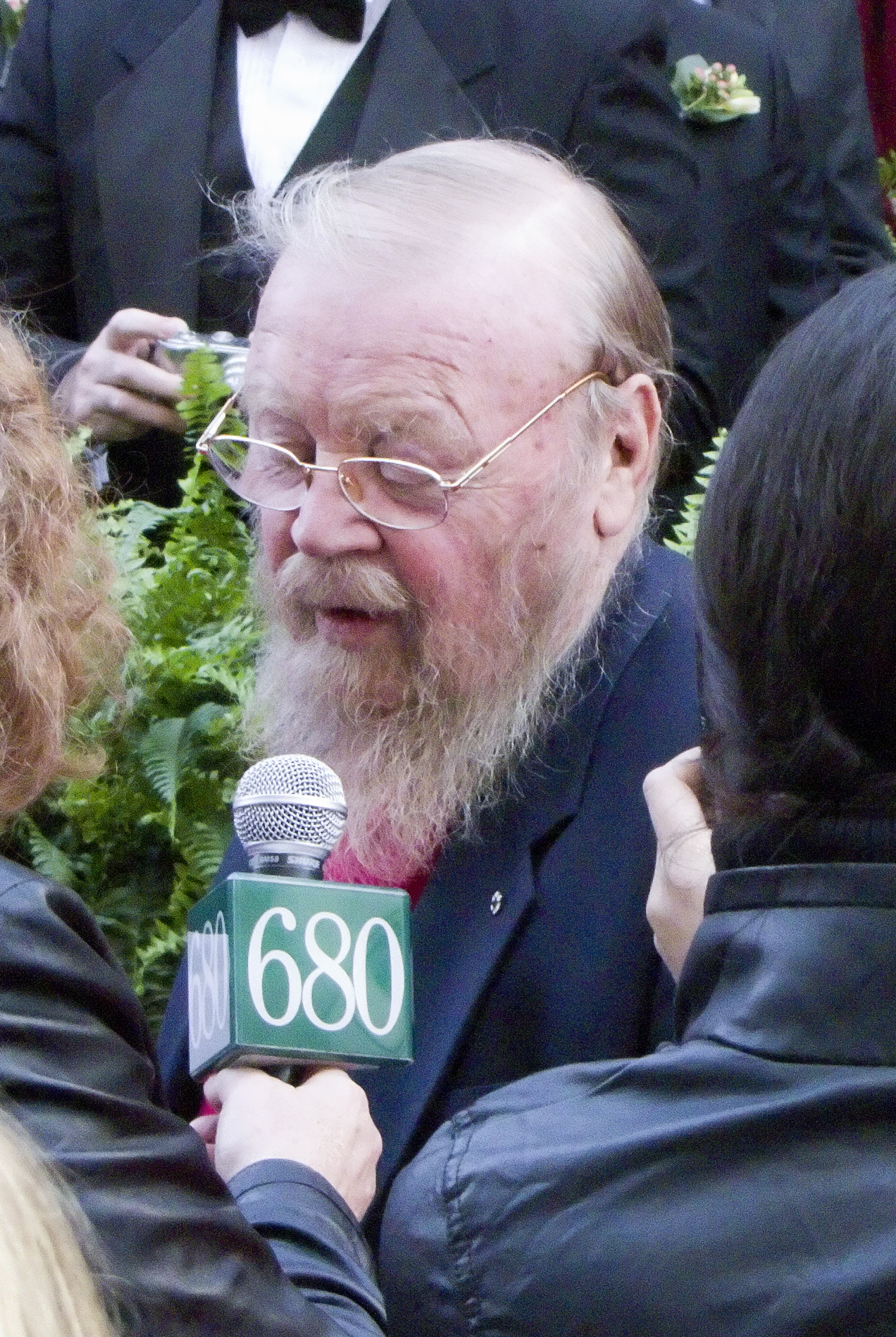
Farley Mowat

- May 6 – Farley Mowat, 92, author (born 1921)
- May 24 – Knowlton Nash, 86, journalist (born 1927)
- May 30 – Yaëla Hertz, 84, Israeli-Canadian teacher and violinist (born 1930)

=== June ===
- June 18 – Claire Martin, 100, author.

=== August ===
- August 31 – Carol Vadnais, 68, hockey player (born 1945)

=== September ===
- September 21
  - Jim Deva, 65, activist and co-owner of Little Sister's Book and Art Emporium
  - Linda Griffiths, 60, actress and playwright (born 1953)

=== October ===
- October 18 – Jean-Paul Saint-Pierre, 65, politician, Mayor of Russell, Ontario (since 2010) (born 1949).
- October 28 – J. Ross Mackay, Canadian geographer and academic (born 1915)

=== November ===
- November 22 – Merle Barwis, 113, American-Canadian supercentenarian (born 1900)
- November 23 – Pat Quinn, 71, ice hockey player, coach and executive (born 1943)
- November 26 – Gilles Tremblay, 75, hockey player (born 1938)
- November 29 – Brian Macdonald, 86, choreographer, Companion of the Order of Canada (born 1928)
- November 30 – Muriel Millard, actress, dancer, painter, singer-songwriter (born 1922)

=== December ===
- December 2 – Jean Béliveau, 83, hockey player and executive (born 1931)
- December 10 – Bob Solinger, ice hockey player (born 1925)

== See also ==
- 2014 in Canadian music
- 2014 in Canadian television
- List of Canadian films of 2014
