= 2008 in Canada =

- Decades: 1980s; 1990s; 2000s; 2010s; 2020s
- See also: History of Canada; Timeline of Canadian history; List of years in Canada

Events from the year 2008 in Canada.

== Incumbents ==
=== Crown ===
- Monarch – Elizabeth II

=== Federal government ===
- Governor General – Michaëlle Jean
- Prime Minister – Stephen Harper
- Chief Justice – Beverley McLachlin (British Columbia)
- Parliament – 39th (until 26 September) then 40th (from November 18)

=== Provincial governments ===
==== Lieutenant governors ====
- Lieutenant Governor of Alberta – Norman Kwong
- Lieutenant Governor of British Columbia – Steven Point
- Lieutenant Governor of Manitoba – John Harvard
- Lieutenant Governor of New Brunswick – Herménégilde Chiasson
- Lieutenant Governor of Newfoundland and Labrador – Edward Roberts (until February 4) then John Crosbie
- Lieutenant Governor of Nova Scotia – Mayann Francis
- Lieutenant Governor of Ontario – David Onley
- Lieutenant Governor of Prince Edward Island – Barbara Oliver Hagerman
- Lieutenant Governor of Quebec – Pierre Duchesne
- Lieutenant Governor of Saskatchewan – Gordon Barnhart

==== Premiers ====
- Premier of Alberta – Ed Stelmach
- Premier of British Columbia – Gordon Campbell
- Premier of Manitoba – Gary Doer
- Premier of New Brunswick – Shawn Graham
- Premier of Newfoundland and Labrador – Danny Williams
- Premier of Nova Scotia – Rodney MacDonald
- Premier of Ontario – Dalton McGuinty
- Premier of Prince Edward Island – Robert Ghiz
- Premier of Quebec – Jean Charest
- Premier of Saskatchewan – Brad Wall

=== Territorial governments ===
==== Commissioners ====
- Commissioner of Yukon – Geraldine Van Bibber
- Commissioner of Northwest Territories – Tony Whitford
- Commissioner of Nunavut – Ann Meekitjuk Hanson

==== Premiers ====
- Premier of the Northwest Territories – Floyd Roland
- Premier of Nunavut – Paul Okalik (until November 14) then Eva Aariak
- Premier of Yukon – Dennis Fentie

== Events ==
=== January to March ===
- January 3 – In Montreal, a false bomb threat forces the closing of Victoria Bridge for four and a half hours.
- January 12 – A road accident near Bathurst, New Brunswick leaves eight people dead, including seven teenagers and one woman. They were all members of the Bathurst High School basketball team.
- January 15 – Europol Operation Koala arrests 9 Canadians in connection to an international paedophile ring.
- January 28 – CTV's Canada AM adds a second hosting team in western Canada, expanding the program to six hours and becoming the first morning television program in North America to air live in all time zones.
- February 11 – The first of three treatment facilities open in Halifax Regional Municipality a $400 million project to clean up the Halifax Harbour
- February 13 – An explosion occurs at a Taco del Mar on Broadway Street in Vancouver.
- February 20 – A large fire in Toronto, ON destroyed several buildings on the south side of Queen Street West, between Bathurst and Portland Streets.
- March – The Apple iPhone is expected to be released on Rogers Wireless service provider.
- March 3 – The 2008 Alberta general election occurs. The Progressive Conservative party, led by Ed Stelmach, wins the election with a majority.
- March 17 – Federal by-elections in Toronto Centre, Willowdale, Desnethé—Missinippi—Churchill River and Vancouver Quadra.
- March 28 – The start of the 2008 Canadian Commercial Seal Hunt

=== April to June ===
- April 5 – The Quebec City Armoury burns down.
- April 19 – Bowie Seamount on the British Columbia Coast becomes a Marine Protected Area.
- April 26 – The Toronto Transit Commission's union, the ATU Local 113 voted against a contract causing mayhem throughout the city as they gave only an hour's notice to Torontonians. Strike ended the day after when they were forced back to work through legislation. It also revived the debate as to whether the TTC is an essential service or not.
- May 23 – The National Assembly of Quebec unanimously adopts a motion defending the maintenance of the Crucifix in the National Assembly.
- May 29 – The Ukrainian Famine and Genocide (“Holodomor”) Memorial Day Act is assented.
- May 30 – Maxime Bernier resigned from his federal cabinet post as Minister of Foreign Affairs, after a scandal where it was discovered that he had left confidential NATO briefing documents at the home of his former girlfriend, Julie Couillard. She was a former model who had past romantic links with members of the Hells Angels.
- June 11 – The federal government officially apologizes for the systematic abuses inflicted to Aboriginal children in the residential school system.
- June 14 – Howard Hampton announces his resignation from the leadership of the Ontario New Democratic Party, resulting in the commencement of the 2009 Ontario New Democratic Party leadership election.
- June 20 – Presidential candidate John McCain speaks before the Economic Club of Toronto.

=== July to September ===
- July 1 – Chief of the Defence Staff (Canada) General Rick Hillier's term is set to end; Hillier is replaced by Walter Natynczyk.
- August – 2008 Canada listeriosis outbreak.
- August 10 – Toronto Explosions leaves 2 dead and thousands evacuate their homes.
- August 28 – The governor general announces the creation of the Sacrifice Medal.
- August 30 – The former Liberal MP Blair Wilson announces he is joining the Green Party of Canada, becoming the party's first MP.
- September 7 – Stephen Harper issues the writs for the 2008 federal election. Federal by-elections which had been scheduled in Westmount—Ville-Marie, Saint-Lambert and Guelph for September 8 are pre-empted by the election call.
- September 19 – A fire, later confirmed as arson by two young offenders, destroys the historic Sudbury Steelworkers Hall in Sudbury, Ontario.
- September 29 – The S&P/TSX Composite Index drops by 840.93 points, the most in eight years, in reaction to the American financial crisis.

=== October to December ===
- October 1 – French-language debate for federal party leaders
- October 2 – English-language debate for federal party leaders
- October 10 – 2008 British Columbia pipeline bombings: Letters were sent to local media outlets warning oil and gas companies to leave the area saying: "We will no longer negotiate with terrorists which you are as you keep endangering our families with crazy expansion of deadly gas wells in our home lands".
- October 12 – 2008 British Columbia pipeline bombings: An explosion occurred on a sour gas pipeline to the east of Dawson Creek British Columbia.
- October 14 – The 40th Canadian general election results in the Conservative Party of Canada holding the largest number of seats in the third consecutive minority Parliament. Stephen Harper remains Prime Minister.
- October 16 – 2008 British Columbia pipeline bombings: A second blast hit a natural gas pipeline. Workers discovered the blast site at approximately 10 a.m. MT off British Columbia Highway 2.
- October 20 – Stéphane Dion announces his resignation as Leader of the Liberal Party of Canada, effective upon the selection of his successor in May 2009.
- October 22 – 2008 financial crisis: The Canadian dollar drops below US$0.80 for the first time since mid-2005.
- October 31 – 2008 British Columbia pipeline bombings: A third bomb detonated at a natural gas wellhead in the region of Dawson Creek
- November 14 – Eva Aariak is selected as the new premier of Nunavut at the Nunavut Leadership Forum in Iqaluit.
- December 1 – 2008 Canadian parliamentary dispute: The Liberal Party of Canada and the New Democratic Party sign an agreement to form a coalition government with the support of the Bloc Québécois if they are successful in defeating the Conservative minority government in a confidence vote.
- December 4 – The 40th Canadian Parliament is prorogued until January 26, delaying the planned non-confidence vote.
- December 8 – 2008 Quebec general election
- December 10 – Michael Ignatieff becomes the interim leader of the Liberal Party, succeeding Stéphane Dion. He is expected to be ratified as permanent leader at the May 2009 Liberal leadership convention.
- December 28 – Two avalanches occur near Fernie, killing eight people and injuring three others.

=== Date not known ===
- Has God Forsaken Africa?, a Canadian 2008 documentary film is released.
- Mirella Amato, trilingual beer consultant, beer sommelier, and author founds Beerology company.
- Vast Studios is founded in Toronto.

== Arts and literature ==
- December 8 – Marc Mayer is appointed director of the National Gallery of Canada.

=== Film ===
- March 3 – 28th Genie Awards

=== Music ===
- April 6 – Juno Awards of 2008

== Sport ==
- January 16 – January 20 – 2008 Canadian Figure Skating Championships
  - Men's medalists – Patrick Chan, gold; Jeffrey Buttle, silver; Shawn Sawyer, bronze.
  - Women's medalists – Joannie Rochette, gold; Mira Leung, silver; Cynthia Phaneuf, bronze.
  - Pairs' medalists – Anabelle Langlois / Cody Hay, gold; Jessica Dubé / Bryce Davison, silver; Meagan Duhamel / Craig Buntin, bronze.
  - Dance medalists – Tessa Virtue / Scott Moir, gold; Kaitlyn Weaver / Andrew Poje, silver; Allie Hann-McCurdy / Michael Coreno, bronze.
- February 11 – February 17 – 2008 Four Continents Figure Skating Championships
  - Jeffrey Buttle wins the silver medal in the men's singles division.
  - Tessa Virtue and Scott Moir win the gold medal in ice dance.
  - Joannie Rochette win the silver medal in the woman's singles division.
- March 17 – March 23 – 2008 World Figure Skating Championships
  - March 19 – Jessica Dubé/Bryce Davison win the bronze medal in pairs.
  - March 21 – Tessa Virtue/Scott Moir win the silver medal in ice dancing.
  - March 22 – Jeffrey Buttle win the gold medal and became world champion in men's singles.
- March 22 – March 30 – The 2008 World Women's Curling Championship is held at the Wesbild Centre in Vernon, British Columbia, Canada. Jennifer Jones' rink from Canada won the gold medal and became world champions.
- April 4 – April 14 – The 2008 World Men's Curling Championship is held at Ralph Engelstad Arena in Grand Forks, North Dakota. Kevin Martin's rink from Canada won the gold medal and became world champions.
- April 30 – 2008 CFL draft: Moose Jaw native and Saskatchewan Huskies Canadian football player Dylan Barker is chosen first overall by the Hamilton Tiger-Cats.
- May 25 – The Spokane Chiefs win their second Memorial Cup by defeating the Kitchener Rangers 4 to 1. The entire tournament was played at the Kitchener Memorial Auditorium
- July 19 – August 3 – 2008 Rogers Cup Canada Masters Tennis Tournament: Men's event held in Toronto, women's event held in Montreal.
- September 10 – Jeffrey Buttle retires from competitive figure skating.
- September 19 – Laval, Quebec's El Generico (Sami Zayn) and Marieville, Quebec's Kevin Steen win their first ROH Tag Team Championship by defeating at the Boston University for Ring of Honor's Driven 2008
- November 22 – The Laval Rouge et Or win their fifth Vanier Cup by defeating the Western Ontario Mustangs 44 to 21 in the 44th Vanier Cup played at Ivor Wynne Stadium in Hamilton
- November 23 – The Calgary Stampeders win their sixth Grey Cup by defeating the Montreal Alouettes 22 to 14 in the 96th Grey Cup played at Olympic Stadium at Montreal. Niagara Falls, Ontario's Sandro DeAngelis was awarded the game's Most Outstanding Canadian

== Deaths ==
=== January ===
- January 1 – Stefanie Rengel, age 14, is stabbed to death. David Bashaw, 17, and Melissa Todorovic, 15, were both tried as adults. Convicted of first-degree murder, they received life sentences.
- January 3 – Milt Dunnell, sportswriter (born 1905)
- January 4 – Mort Garson, electronic musician (born 1924)
- January 5 – John Ashley, referee in the National Hockey League (born 1930)
- January 10 – Allan McEachern, lawyer, judge and university chancellor (born 1926)
- January 11 – Murray Cohl, film producer, co-founder of the Toronto Film Festival and Canada's Walk of Fame (born 1929)
- January 19 – Don Wittman, sportscaster (born 1936)
- January 20 – Talivaldis Kenins, composer (born 1919)
- January 21 – Pam Barrett, politician (born 1953)
- January 22 – Mike Cacic, football player for BC Lions (born 1937)

=== February ===
- February 2 – Barry Morse, actor (born 1918)
- February 15 – Willie P. Bennett, folk music singer-songwriter (born 1951)
- February 16 – Harry Flemming, journalist (born 1933)
- February 17
  - Bill Juzda, ice hockey player (born 1920)
  - Val Ross, writer and journalist (born 1950)
- February 18 – Mickey Renaud, junior ice hockey center (born 1988)
- February 23 – Denis Lazure, politician (born 1925)
- February 28 – Milt Harradence, lawyer, pilot, politician and judge (born 1922)
- February 29 – Ralph Hansch, Olympic ice hockey player (born 1924)

=== March ===
- March 2 – Jeff Healey, jazz and blues-rock guitarist and vocalist (born 1966)
- March 8 – Donald C. MacDonald, politician (born 1913)
- March 9 – Simon Reisman, civil servant and chief negotiator of the Canada-United States Free Trade Agreement (born 1919)
- March 11 – J. I. Albrecht, manager and director in the CFL (born 1931)
- March 15 – Ken Reardon, ice hockey defenceman (Montreal Canadiens)(born 1921)
- March 18 – Geoffrey Pearson, diplomat (born 1927)
- March 21 – George Gross, sports journalist, founding sports editor of the Toronto Sun (born 1923)
- March 24 – Sherri Wood, journalist (Toronto Sun) (born 1979)
- March 28 – Lorne Ferguson, ice hockey player (born 1930)

=== April ===
- April 1 – Jake Warren, diplomat, Canadian Ambassador to the United States (b. 1921)
- April 10 – Francis Coleman, conductor, television producer and director (born 1924)
- April 22 – Ed Chynoweth, president of the Western Hockey League (1972–1995) and CHL (1975–1995) (born 1941)
- April 23
  - Martha Kostuch, environmentalist (born 1949)
  - Don Gillis, (born 1922)
- April 24 – Harry Geris, Olympic wrestler (born 1947)
- April 26 – Henry Brant, Pulitzer Prize-winning composer (born 1913)
- April 30 – Allan Sparrow, activist and Toronto city councillor (1974–1980) (born 1944)

=== May ===
- May 3 – Charles Caccia, politician (born 1930)
- May 9 – Arthur Kroeger, civil servant (1958–1992), academic and chancellor of Carleton University (1993–2002) (born 1932)
- May 11 – John Rutsey, drummer (Rush) (born 1953)
- May 17
  - Joyce Trimmer, politician and first female mayor of Scarborough, Ontario (born 1927)
  - D. Aubrey Moodie, politician (born 1908)
- May 19 – Jack Duffy, actor and comedian (born 1926)
- May 20 – Cy Leonard, ventriloquist (born 1926)
- May 29 – Luc Bourdon, ice hockey player (born 1987)

=== June ===
- June 2 – Sheela Basrur, medical doctor and Chief Medical Officer of Health in Ontario (born 1956)
- June 3 – Pat Egan, ice hockey defenceman (born 1918)
- June 4 – Jack Byrne (politician), member of Newfoundland and Labrador House of Assembly, mayor of LB-MC-OC (1986–1993) (born 1951)
- June 6 – Edwin Tchorzewski, politician (born 1943)
- June 8 – Charles-Noël Barbès, politician and lawyer (born 1914)
- June 11
  - James Reaney, poet, playwright and literary critic (born 1926)
  - Brian Budd, soccer player (born 1952)
- June 15 – Ray Getliffe, ice hockey player (born 1914)
- June 20 – Bea Firth, politician (born 1946)
- June 21 – William Vince, film producer, Academy Award nominee (born 1963)
- June 25 – Bill Robinson, ice hockey player (born 1921)
- June 30 – Arthur Ryan Smith, serviceman, politician and Order of Canada recipient (born 1919)

=== July ===
- July 3 – Oliver Schroer, fiddler, composer and music producer (born 1956)
- July 6 – Bob Ackles, executive for the CFL's BC Lions (born 1938)
- July 14 – Lawrence Ytzhak Braithwaite, novelist, spoken word artist, dub poet, essayist and musician (born 1963)
- July 16 – Peanuts O'Flaherty, ice hockey player (born 1918)
- July 21 – Sidney Craig, entrepreneur and thoroughbred horse owner, co-founder of Jenny Craig, Inc. (born 1932)
- July 22 – Helen Gardiner, philanthropist and co-founder of the Gardiner Museum (born 1938)
- July 23 – N. Robin Crossby, game designer, creator of Hârn role-playing system (born 1954)
- July 25 – Joseph Gérard Lauri P. Landry, businessman, senator (1996–1997) (born 1922)
- July 27 – Fenwick Lansdowne, wildlife artist (born 1937)
- July 30
  - Leif Pettersen, footballer and sportscaster (born 1950)
  - Tim McLean, homicide victim (born 1985)
  - Vittorio Fiorucci, graphic artist (born 1932)

=== August ===
- August 2 – Geoffrey Ballard, businessman and fuel cell scientist, founder of Ballard Power Systems (born 1932)
- August 5 – Daniel L. Norris, commissioner of the Northwest Territories (1989–1994) (born 1935)
- August 6 – Reg Whitehouse, football player (Saskatchewan Roughriders) (born 1933)
- August 10 – Lee Clark, politician, MP for Brandon—Souris (1983–1993) (born 1936)
- August 12 – Gilles Bilodeau, National Hockey League and World Hockey Association player (born 1955)
- August 28 – Michel Vastel, journalist and columnist (born 1940)
- August 30
  - Eldon Rathburn, composer (born 1916)
  - Killer Kowalski, professional wrestler (born 1926)

=== September ===
- September 1 – Thomas J. Bata, businessman (born 1914)
- September 4
  - Jerome Weber, abbot of St. Peter-Muenster of Saskatchewan (born 1915)
  - Erik Nielsen, deputy prime minister (1984–1986), brother of Leslie Nielsen (born 1924)
- September 6 – Allan Lawrence, politician and Minister (born 1925)
- September 7 – Larry Shaben, politician, member of Legislative Assembly of Alberta (1975–1989) (born 1935)
- September 9 – Richard Monette, actor and director (born 1944)
- September 10 – Gérald Beaudoin, lawyer and senator (1988–2004) (born 1929)
- September 11 – Bennett Campbell, (1988–2004) (born 1943)
- September 13 – James W. Snow, politician, member of Legislative Assembly of Ontario (1967–1985) (born 1929)
- September 15 – Marion Dewar, politician, mayor of Ottawa (1978–1985) (born 1928)
- September 18 – Peter Kastner, actor (born 1943)
- September 23 – Brock McElheran, conductor and composer (born 1918)
- September 25 – Ralph Sazio, football coach (Hamilton Tiger-Cats) (born 1922)
- September 28 – Anna-Marie Globenski, pianist and teacher (born 1929)

=== October ===
- October 4 – Saul Laskin, politician and 1 Mayor of Thunder Bay (born 1918)
- October 9 – Milan Kymlicka, arranger, composer and conductor (born 1936)
- October 11 – Nelson Symonds, jazz guitarist (born 1933)
- October 12 – Leo Major, soldier (born 1921)
- October 17 – Ben Weider, bodybuilding promoter and Napoleon scholar (born 1923)
- October 18 – Charley Fox, pilot credited with strafing Erwin Rommel's car (born 1920)
- October 27
  - Louis Secco, Olympic gold medal-winning (1952) ice hockey player (born 1927)
  - Charles Dubin, lawyer and former Chief Justice of Ontario (born 1921)

=== November ===
- November 1 – Oscar Lathlin, politician (born 1947)
- November 2 – Jim Koleff, hockey player and coach (born 1953)
- November 5 – Norm Marshall, broadcaster (born 1918)
- November 12 – George Morrison, ice hockey player (born 1948)
- November 17
  - Pete Newell, basketball coach (born 1915)
  - Debby oldest living polar bear, third-oldest known bear (born 1966)
- November 24
  - Ray Perrault, politician (born 1926)
  - Kenny MacLean, bassist (Platinum Blonde) (born 1956)
  - Bep Guidolin, ice hockey player and coach (born 1925)
- November 24 – Tom Burgess, baseball player and coach (born 1927)
- November 27 – William Landymore, naval officer (born 1916)
- November 30 – Pit Martin, ice hockey player (born 1943)

=== December ===
- December 1 – Betty Goodwin, artist (born 1923)
- December 2 – Edward Samuel Rogers, businessman, CEO of Rogers Communications and owner of the Toronto Blue Jays (born 1933)
- December 9 – Brenda Leipsic, politician (born 1942)
- December 14 – Hank Goldup, ice hockey player (born 1918)
- December 15 – Mike Blum, football player (Toronto Argonauts, Hamilton Tiger-Cats) (born 1943)
- December 16 – Joe Krol, football player (Toronto Argonauts) (born 1919)
- December 21 – James Fulton, politician, Member of Parliament for Skeena (1979–1993) (born 1950)
- December 24 – Gordon Fairweather, politician, Member of Parliament for Royal, New Brunswick (1962–1977) (born 1923)

== See also ==
- 2008 in Canadian music
- 2008 in Canadian television
- List of Canadian films of 2008
