= 1929 in Canada =

- Decades: 1900s; 1910s; 1920s; 1930s; 1940s
- See also: History of Canada; Timeline of Canadian history; List of years in Canada

Events from the year 1929 in Canada.

== Incumbents ==
=== Crown ===
- Monarch – George V

=== Federal government ===
- Governor General – Freeman Freeman-Thomas, 1st Marquess of Willingdon
- Prime Minister – William Lyon Mackenzie King
- Chief Justice – Francis Alexander Anglin (Ontario)
- Parliament – 16th

=== Provincial governments ===
==== Lieutenant governors ====
- Lieutenant Governor of Alberta – William Egbert
- Lieutenant Governor of British Columbia – Robert Randolph Bruce
- Lieutenant Governor of Manitoba – Theodore Arthur Burrows (until January 18) then James Duncan McGregor (from January 28)
- Lieutenant Governor of New Brunswick – Hugh Havelock McLean
- Lieutenant Governor of Nova Scotia – James Cranswick Tory
- Lieutenant Governor of Ontario – William Donald Ross
- Lieutenant Governor of Prince Edward Island – Frank Richard Heartz
- Lieutenant Governor of Quebec – Lomer Gouin (until March 28) then Henry George Carroll (from April 2)
- Lieutenant Governor of Saskatchewan – Henry William Newlands

==== Premiers ====
- Premier of Alberta – John Edward Brownlee
- Premier of British Columbia – Simon Fraser Tolmie
- Premier of Manitoba – John Bracken
- Premier of New Brunswick – John Baxter
- Premier of Nova Scotia – Edgar Nelson Rhodes
- Premier of Ontario – George Howard Ferguson
- Premier of Prince Edward Island – Albert Charles Saunders
- Premier of Quebec – Louis-Alexandre Taschereau
- Premier of Saskatchewan – James Garfield Gardiner (until September 9) then James Thomas Milton Anderson

=== Territorial governments ===
==== Commissioners ====
- Gold Commissioner of Yukon – George Ian MacLean
- Commissioner of Northwest Territories – William Wallace Cory

== Events ==
- January 10 – Lomer Gouin becomes Quebec's 15th lieutenant governor, serving until his death on March 28, 1929.
- March 22 – The Canadian schooner and rum-runner I'm Alone is sunk by the US Coast Guard's USCGC Dexter.
- April 4 – Henry George Carroll becomes Quebec's 16th lieutenant governor.
- June 6 – 1929 Saskatchewan election: James Garfield Gardiner's Liberals win a plurality, but the other parties, led by James T.M. Anderson's Conservatives, will form a coalition against Gardiner, forcing him to resign as premier
- May 29 – A series of explosions rips through Ottawa's sewer system.
- September 9 – James Anderson becomes premier of Saskatchewan, replacing James Gardiner
- September 10 – The Hudson Bay Railway opens for traffic to Churchill, Manitoba
- October 18 – The Judicial Committee of the Privy Council rules in the Persons Case that women are eligible to be senators.
- October 29 – The crash of the New York Stock Exchange marks the beginning of the Great Depression
- October 30 – Ontario election: Howard Ferguson's Conservatives win a third consecutive majority
- November 13 – A second stock market crash hits Canada.

== Arts and literature ==
- January 6 – Regina's Darke Hall auditorium opened.

== Science and technology ==
- Wop May and Vic Horner brave poor visibility and −30 °C temperatures in an open cockpit to rush diphtheria anti-toxin to Fort Vermilion.
- Frozen fish fillets are introduced by the Biological Board of Canada developed by Archibald Huntsman.

== Sport ==
- March 30 – The Ontario Hockey Association's Toronto Marlboros win their first Memorial Cup by defeating the Manitoba Junior Hockey League's Elmwood Millionaires 2 games to 0. The deciding Game 2 was played at Mutual Street Arena in Toronto
- September 12 – The first legal forward pass in Canadian football is completed.
- November 30 – The Hamilton Tigers win their fourth Grey Cup, defeating the Regina Roughriders 14 to 3 in the 17th Grey Cup played at A.A.A. Grounds in Hamilton

== Births ==
=== January to March ===
- January 17 – Jacques Plante, ice hockey player (d. 1986)
- January 20 – Pat Mahoney, businessman, politician, and judge, MP for Calgary South (1968–1972), General Manager of the Calgary Stampeders (1965) (d. 2012)
- January 21 – Bill Norrie, politician and educator, Mayor of Winnipeg (1979–1992), Chancellor of the University of Manitoba (2001–2009), respiratory failure. (d. 2012)
- January 23 – John Polanyi, chemist and 1986 Nobel Prize in Chemistry joint laureate
- January 25 – Brian O'Neill, ice hockey executive (d. 2023)
- February 12 – Philip Kives, businessman
- February 14 – Renée Maheu, biographer, journalist and soprano (d. 2007)
- February 28 – Frank Gehry, architect (d. 2025)
- March 20 – William Andrew MacKay, academic, President of Dalhousie University (1980–1986) (d. 2013)

=== April to June ===
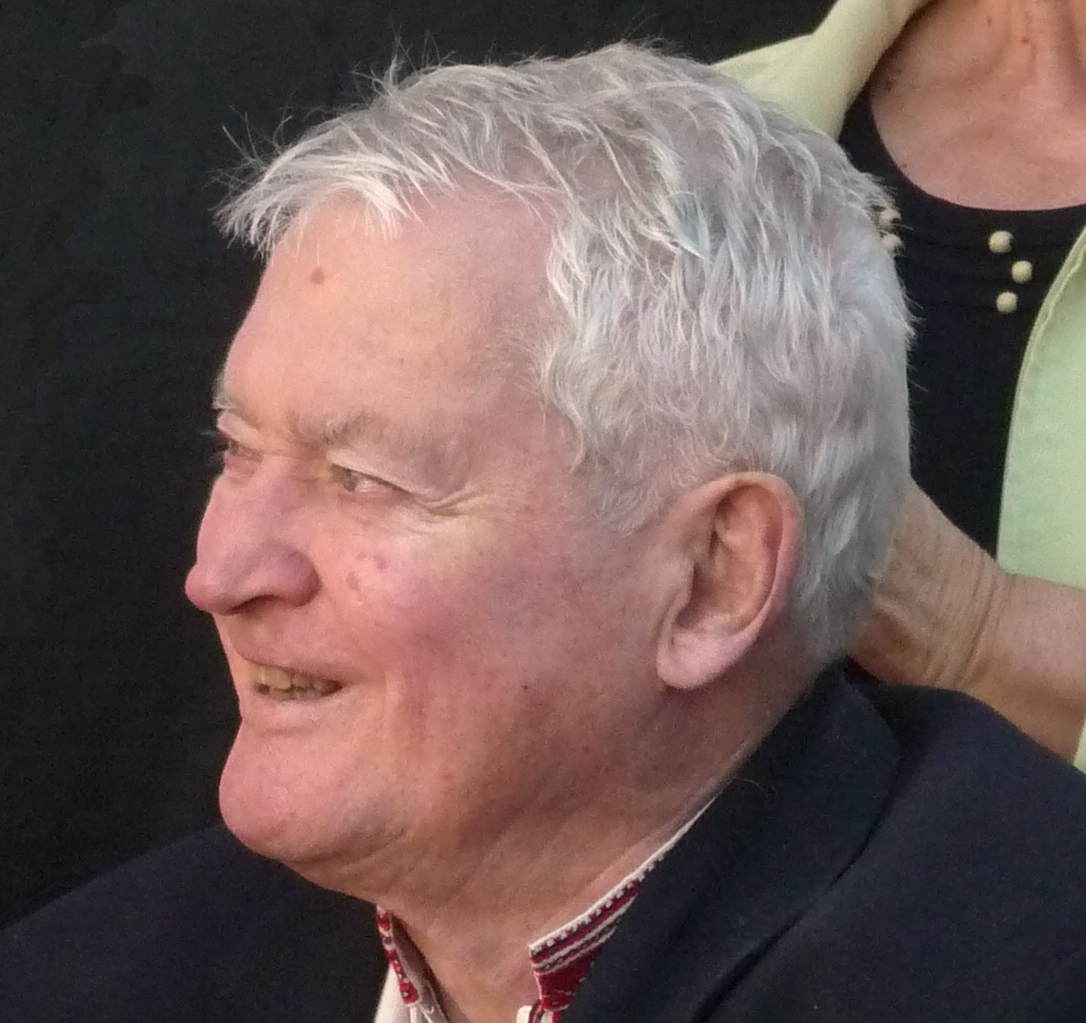
John Turner in September 2009

- April 8 – Garnet Bloomfield, politician (d. 2018)
- April 11 – Eric Luoma, cross-country skier (d. 2018)
- May 8 – Claude Castonguay, banker and politician (d. 2020)
- May 10
  - Antonine Maillet, novelist, playwright and scholar
  - Peter C. Newman, journalist (d. 2023)
- May 12 – Dollard St. Laurent, Canadian ice hockey player (d. 2015)
- May 13 – Al Adair, politician, radio broadcaster and author (d. 1996)
- May 14 – Gump Worsley, ice hockey player (d. 2007)
- May 16 – Claude Morin, politician
- May 18 – Walter Pitman, educator and politician
- May 28- Shane Rimmer, actor (d. 2019 in the United Kingdom)
- May 29 – Fernande Chiocchio, mezzo-soprano, pianist and teacher (d. 2021)
- June 7
  - John Turner, lawyer, politician and 17th Prime Minister of Canada
  - Walter Weir, politician and 15th Premier of Manitoba (d. 1985)
- June 8 – Louise Maheux-Forcier, author
- June 9
  - Jean Rougeau, professional wrestler and bodyguard of Quebec Premier René Lévesque (d. 1983)
  - Harold R. Steele, businessman (d. 2022)
- June 10 – Pearl McGonigal, politician
- June 20 – Edgar Bronfman, Sr., businessman
- June 27 – H. Ian Macdonald, economist

=== July to September ===
- July 2 – Anna-Marie Globenski, pianist and teacher (d. 2008)
- July 3 – Béatrice Picard, actress (d. 2025)
- July 4 – Walt Konarski, Canadian football player
- July 10 – Moe Norman, golfer (d. 2004)
- July 18 – Roy Killin, footballer
- July 19 – Ronald Melzack, psychologist (d. 2019)
- July 26 – Marc Lalonde, politician and Minister (d. 2023)
- July 30 – Bill Davis, politician and 18th Premier of Ontario
- August 1 – Sidney Green, politician
- August 3 – Peter Salmon, swimmer (d. 2003)
- August 9 – George Scott Wallace, British Columbia physician and politician (d. 2011)
- August 19 – Leonard Evans, politician
- August 27 – George Scott, professional wrestler and promoter (d. 2014)
- September 14 – Dimitri Dimakopoulos, architect
- September 19 – Gertrude Story, writer and broadcaster (d. 2014)
- September 24 -Edward M. Lawson, trade unionist, politician and Senator

=== October to December ===
- October 2 – Peter Bronfman, businessman (d. 1996)
- October 7 – Graeme Ferguson, filmmaker and inventor who co-invented IMAX (d. 2021)
- November 1 – Charles Juravinski, businessman and philanthropist (d. 2022)
- November 2 – Richard E. Taylor, physicist, 1990 Nobel Prize in Physics joint laureate (d. 2018)
- November 21 – Laurier LaPierre, broadcaster, journalist, author and senator (d. 2012)
- November 24 – Harry Oliver Bradley, politician
- December 6 – Harry Langford, footballer (d. 2022)
- December 13 – Christopher Plummer, actor (d. 2021)
- December 15 – Emery Barnes, Canadian football player and politician (d. 1998)
- December 23 – Patrick Watson, broadcaster, author, commentator and television writer, producer and director (d. 2022)
- December 28 – Terry Sawchuk, ice hockey player (d. 1970)

=== Full date unknown ===
- Ken Adachi, writer and literary critic (d. 1989)

== Deaths ==
=== January to March ===
- January 6 – George Henry Murray, politician and Premier of Nova Scotia (b. 1861)
- January 14 – Alexander Warburton, politician, jurist, author and Premier of Prince Edward Island (b. 1852)
- January 18 – Theodore Arthur Burrows, politician and Lieutenant-Governor of Manitoba (b. 1857)

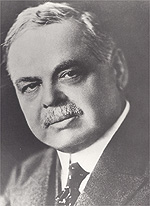
Lomer Gouin

- January 19 – Edward Charles Bowers, politician (b. 1845)
- January 29 – John Howatt Bell, lawyer, politician and Premier of Prince Edward Island (b. 1846)
- February – Richard Gardiner Willis, politician (b. 1865)
- February 17 – James Colebrooke Patterson, politician, Minister and Lieutenant-Governor of Manitoba (b. 1839)
- March 1 – James Albert Manning Aikins, politician and Lieutenant-Governor of Manitoba (b. 1851)
- March 28 – Lomer Gouin, politician and 13th Premier of Quebec (d. 1861)
- March 29 – Hugh John Macdonald, politician, Minister and 8th Premier of Manitoba (b. 1850)

=== April to December ===
- April 17 – Clifford Sifton, politician and Minister (b. 1861)
- May 6 – William Dillon Otter, soldier and first Canadian-born Chief of the General Staff (b. 1843)
- June 3 – John Morison Gibson, politician and Lieutenant Governor of Ontario (b. 1842)
- June 8 – Bliss Carman, poet (b. 1861)
- June 23 – William Stevens Fielding, journalist, politician and Premier of Nova Scotia (b. 1848)
- July 30 – Antonin Nantel, priest, teacher, school administrator, and author (b. 1839)
- October 10 – Elijah McCoy, inventor and engineer (b. 1843)

== See also ==
- List of Canadian films
