= 1926 in Canada =

- Decades: 1900s; 1910s; 1920s; 1930s; 1940s
- See also: History of Canada; Timeline of Canadian history; List of years in Canada

Events from the year 1926 in Canada.

== Incumbents ==
=== Crown ===
- Monarch – George V

=== Federal government ===
- Governor General – Julian Byng, 1st Viscount Byng of Vimy (until October 2) then Freeman Freeman-Thomas, 1st Marquess of Willingdon
- Prime Minister – William Lyon Mackenzie King (until June 28) then Arthur Meighen (June 29 to September 25) then William Lyon Mackenzie King
- Chief Justice – Francis Alexander Anglin (Ontario)
- Parliament – 15th (7 January – 2 July) then 16th (from 9 December)

=== Provincial governments ===
==== Lieutenant governors ====
- Lieutenant Governor of Alberta – William Egbert
- Lieutenant Governor of British Columbia – Walter Cameron Nichol (until January 21) then Robert Randolph Bruce
- Lieutenant Governor of Manitoba – James Albert Manning Aikins (until October 9) then Theodore Arthur Burrows
- Lieutenant Governor of New Brunswick – William Frederick Todd
- Lieutenant Governor of Nova Scotia – James Cranswick Tory
- Lieutenant Governor of Ontario – Henry Cockshutt
- Lieutenant Governor of Prince Edward Island – Frank Richard Heartz
- Lieutenant Governor of Quebec – Narcisse Pérodeau
- Lieutenant Governor of Saskatchewan – Henry William Newlands

==== Premiers ====
- Premier of Alberta – John Edward Brownlee
- Premier of British Columbia – John Oliver
- Premier of Manitoba – John Bracken
- Premier of New Brunswick – John Baxter
- Premier of Nova Scotia – Edgar Nelson Rhodes
- Premier of Ontario – George Howard Ferguson
- Premier of Prince Edward Island – James D. Stewart
- Premier of Quebec – Louis-Alexandre Taschereau
- Premier of Saskatchewan – Charles Avery Dunning (until February 26) then James Garfield Gardiner

=== Territorial governments ===
==== Commissioners ====
- Gold Commissioner of Yukon – Percy Reid
- Commissioner of Northwest Territories – William Wallace Cory

== Events ==
- February 24 – Robert Randolph Bruce becomes British Columbia's 13th lieutenant governor.
- February 26 – James Garfield Gardiner becomes premier of Saskatchewan, replacing Charles Dunning.
- June 24 – The Monument aux Patriotes, Montreal is unveiled.
- June 28 – The King-Byng Affair climaxes as William Lyon Mackenzie King resigns as prime minister. Arthur Meighen becomes prime minister for the second time, but an election is forced when Meighen fails to win the confidence of the House.
- June 28 – 1926 Alberta general election: John Brownlee's United Farmers of Alberta win a second consecutive majority.
- July 1 – Canada moves back onto the gold standard.
- July 17 - The Royal Canadian Legion is incorporated through an act of Parliament.
- September 14 – Federal election: the coalition of Mackenzie King's Liberals and the Liberal-Progressives win a majority, defeating Arthur Meighen's Conservatives.
- September 25 – Mackenzie King becomes prime minister for the second time, replacing Arthur Meighen.
- November 18 – British Dominions are given official autonomy in the Balfour Declaration of 1926.
- December 1 – 1926 Ontario general election: Howard Ferguson's Conservatives win a second consecutive majority.

=== Full date unknown ===
- The Royal Canadian Mounted Police establish a base on Ellesmere Island as a proof of Canadian sovereignty.
- The Saskatchewan Grain Growers Association amalgamates with the Farmers' Union of Canada to create the United Farmers of Canada.

== Sport ==
- March 26 – The Calgary City Junior Hockey League's Calgary Canadians win their only Memorial Cup by defeating the Ontario Hockey Association's Queen's University 2 game to 1. All games were held at Shea's Amphitheatre in Winnipeg
- April 6 – The National Hockey League's Montreal Maroons win their only Stanley Cup by defeating the Western Hockey League Victoria Cougars 3 games to 1. This was the last time a non-NHL team would contest for the Cup. The deciding game was played at the Montreal Forum
- December 4 – The Ottawa Senators win their second Grey Cup by defeating the Toronto Varsity Blues 10 to 7 in the 14th Grey Cup played at Varsity Stadium

== Births ==
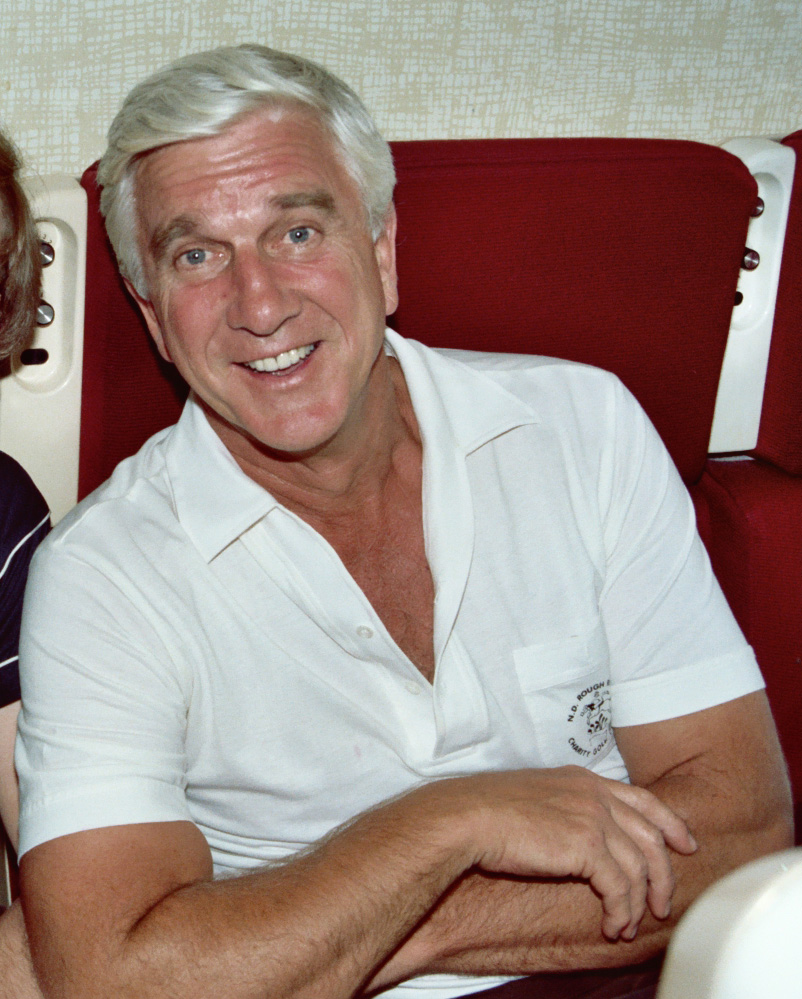
Leslie Nielsen in 1982

=== January to June ===
- January 1 – Dean Bandiera, Canadian football player (d. 2020)
- January 2 – John Stroppa, football player (d. 2017)
- January 3 – Murray Dowey, ice hockey player and Olympic champion (d. 2021)
- January 4 – Betty Kennedy, broadcaster, journalist, author, Senator and gameshow panelist (d. 2017)
- January 20 – John Michael Sherlock, Roman Catholic bishop (d. 2019)
- January 26 – Georges-C. Lachance, politician and father of Claude-André Lachance (d. 2020)
- February 4 – Roger Blais, engineer and academic (d. 2009)
- February 6 – Ray Perrault, politician (d. 2008)
- February 11 – Leslie Nielsen, comedian and actor (d. 2010)
- February 20 – Jean Boucher, politician (d. 2011)
- April 1 – Gérard La Forest, lawyer and judge (d. 2025)
- April 17 – Gerry McNeil, ice hockey player (d. 2004)
- April 21 – Keith Davey, businessman and politician (d. 2011)
- April 28 – Alex Oakley, race walker (d. 2010)
- May 3 – Matt Baldwin, curler (d. 2023)
- May 13 – Joy Coghill, actress, director, and writer (d. 2017)
- May 20 – Allan McEachern, lawyer, judge and university chancellor (d. 2008)
- May 26 – Phyllis Gotlieb, science fiction novelist and poet (d. 2009)
- June 3 – Flora MacDonald, politician (d. 2015)
- June 7 – Jean-Noël Tremblay, lawyer and politician (d. 2020)
- June 15 – Douglas Bell, politician (d. 2021)

=== July to December ===
- July 7 – Armand Lemieux, Canadian ice hockey player (d. 2015)
- July 14 – Wallace Diestelmeyer, figure skater (d. 1999)
- July 18 – Margaret Laurence, novelist and short story writer (d. 1987)
- July 21 – Norman Jewison, film director, producer, actor and founder of the Canadian Film Centre (d. 2024)
- July 22 – Paul Collins, long-distance runner (d. 1995)
- August 13 – Dalton McGuinty Sr., politician and father of premier of Ontario Dalton McGuinty and the politician David McGuinty (d. 1990)
- August 18 – Gordon Donaldson, author and journalist (d. 2001)
- September 1 – James Reaney, poet, playwright and literary critic (d. 2008)
- September 13 – Emile Francis, ice hockey player (d. 2022)
- September 27 – Jack Duffy, actor and comedian (d. 2008)
- October 1 – Ben Wicks, cartoonist, illustrator, journalist and author (d. 2000)
- October 8 – Vern Jones, professional ice hockey player
- October 26 – George Crum, conductor, pianist, vocal coach and musical arranger (d. 2007)
- November 8 – Kay Hawtrey, actress (d. 2021)
- December 3 – Denise Morelle, actress and murder victim (d. 1984)

=== Full date unknown ===
- Daniel McCarthy, television producer (The Friendly Giant, Mr. Dressup, Sesame Park) (d. 2013)

== Deaths ==
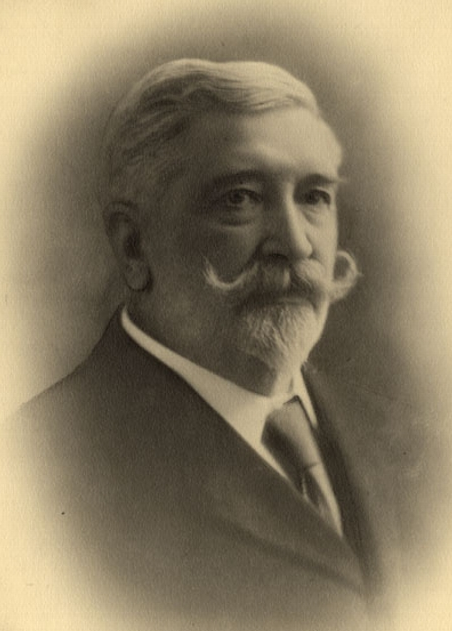
Nérée Le Noblet Duplessis

- January 31 – Paul Tourigny, politician (b. 1852)
- February 2 – John Alexander Macdonald Armstrong, politician (b. 1877)
- February 20 – Paul-Eugène Roy, Roman Catholic priest, and Archbishop of Quebec (b. 1859)
- March 27 – Georges Vézina, ice hockey player (b. 1887)
- June 23 – Nérée Le Noblet Duplessis, politician, 19th Mayor of Trois-Rivières and father of 16th Premier of Quebec Maurice Duplessis (b. 1855)
- August 24 – Laurent-Olivier David, journalist, lawyer, and politician (b. 1840)

== See also ==
- List of Canadian films
