= Mirella =

Mirella is a feminine given name, cognate to Mirela. Notable people with the name include:

- Mirella (born 2005), Finnish singer
- Mirella Amato, bilingual beer consultant, beer sommelier and author in Toronto, Ontario, Canada
- Mirella Arnhold (born 1983), Brazilian alpine skier
- Mirella Avalle (1922–2012), Italian sprinter
- Mirella Bentivoglio (1922–2017), Italian sculptor, poet, performance artist and curator
- Mirella Cesa (born 1984), Ecuadorian singer who has won several awards and been called the "mother of Andipop"
- Mirella Levi D'Ancona (1919–2014), Italian-born American art historian and professor.
- Mirella D'Angelo (born 1956), Italian actress
- Mirella Freni (1935–2020), Italian soprano whose repertoire includes Verdi, Puccini, Mozart and Tchaikovsky
- Mirella Gregori (born 1967), a woman who mysteriously disappeared from Rome in May 1983
- Mirella Harju (born 1982), Finnish former racing cyclist
- Mirella Latorre (1919–2010), Chilean radio and television actress
- Mirella Maniani-Tzelili (born 1976), retired Greek track and field athlete who competed in the javelin throw
- Mirella van Melis (born 1979), retired female track and road racing cyclist from the Netherlands
- Mirella Papaeconomou, Greek television screenwriter
- Mirella Parutto (born 1936), Italian operatic soprano and later mezzo-soprano
- Mirella Ricciardi (born 1931), Kenyan-born photographer and author

== See also ==
- Neodiplocampta mirella, a species of bee flies in the family Bombyliidae
- Mirellia
