= Heidi McKenzie =

Canadian ceramic and installation artist

- Born: 1968 (age 57–58); Fredericton, New Brunswick, Canada
- Education: OCAD University (MFA); Sheridan College (Dipl.); University of Warwick (MA); University of Toronto (BA)
- Occupations: Artist, curator, writer
- Known for: Ceramics, installation art
- Website: www.heidimckenzie.ca

Heidi McKenzie (born 1968) is a Canadian ceramic and installation artist based in Toronto, Ontario. Her work combines ceramics with photography, digital media, and archival material, and explores themes of ancestry, race, migration, and colonization. She has exhibited both nationally and internationally.

== Early life and education ==
McKenzie was born in 1968 in Fredericton, New Brunswick, Canada, to an Indo-Trinidadian father and a white American mother of Canadian and Irish descent. Her father, Joseph Addison McKenzie, was a biologist, academic, and scientist who immigrated to Canada in 1953 and was later appointed the Dean of Science at the University of New Brunswick in 1995. Her mother, Ellen Joyce McMenemy, was a music teacher from a working-class farming family in Ohio. The couple married in the late 1950s, a period when interracial marriage faced significant legal restrictions in several American states and social barriers in Canada. Raised in a musical household, McKenzie became an adept classical pianist and won regional competitions as a child. In 1973, her family relocated to Edinburgh, Scotland, for one year; McKenzie has noted that this period was marked by early experiences of racial "othering" and isolation.

McKenzie pursued her initial post-secondary education in arts policy, earning a Bachelor of Arts in Arts Administration from the University of Toronto in 1991, followed by a Master of Arts in Comparative Cultural Policy from the University of Warwick in 1994. McKenzie studied ceramics at Sheridan College and later completed an MFA at OCAD University in 2014.

== Ceramic training and career ==
McKenzie's transition into a full-time studio art practice was catalyzed by a series of international apprenticeships and formal ceramic education. In 2009, she traveled to her father's ancestral home in India to apprentice under Mansimran Singh at Andretta Pottery in the Himachal Pradesh state; because Singh had been a direct student of British studio potter Bernard Leach, the experience deeply grounded McKenzie's early technical practice. McKenzie works across porcelain and earthenware, utilizing wheel-throwing, hand-building, and slab-throwing techniques.

She subsequently returned to Canada to pursue formal studio training, completing a craft and ceramics diploma at Sheridan College in 2012. During this period, she studied under Canadian ceramicists Les Manning and Winn Burke, the latter of whom she credits with shifting her focus toward world cultures. McKenzie then earned a Master of Fine Arts in Criticism and Curatorial Practice from OCAD University in 2014. Following her graduation, she established a full-time artistic practice.

In 2017, she further expanded her technical scale and reduction-firing techniques through a three-month master apprenticeship with Mitsuo Shoji in Sydney, Australia. Also in late 2017, supported by a research grant from the Canadian Consular Office, she traveled to the Northern Territory to spend time collaborating and conducting studio demonstrations with the Indigenous women of the Hermannsburg Potters collective near Alice Springs. She cites this experience as highly influential for the importance of telling her own family story through ceramics.

Her work has been the subject of coverage in ceramics and arts publications. In 2021, Ceramics Monthly published a feature on McKenzie's studio practice and artistic development. In 2022, CKUA featured her exhibition Brick by Brick: Absence vs. Presence, describing it as a multimedia exhibition incorporating historical and contemporary photographs, ceramic sculpture, and other audiovisual elements.

Her upbringing and identity serve as central subjects in her practice, which frequently investigates themes of migration, colonization, historical archives, and memory. She notes wanting to trouble the notion of mixed race identity and Caribbean identity through her work, describing her functional and sculptural pieces alike as expressions of internal storytelling. In 2023, she presented the solo exhibition Reclaimed: Indo-Caribbean HerStories at the Gardiner Museum in Toronto. Reviewing the exhibition in Foyer, Simone Aziga wrote that McKenzie's mixed-media, ceramic-based work centered the histories and lived experiences of Indo-Caribbean women through a feminist lens.

In a 2024 profile in Brown Girl Magazine, Savita Prasad described McKenzie's work as an effort to recover and visualize Indo-Caribbean histories, particularly the stories of women obscured by colonial archives. In the same year, the Royal Ontario Museum acquired her pieces Iluminated and First Wave for its permanent collection and published a feature interview with her in the ROM Magazine. In 2025, her piece Building Blocks was included in the permanent collection of the Gardiner Museum.

== Works and themes ==
McKenzie draws from her personal genealogy to address the broader histories of the South Asian diaspora. A pivotal point of inquiry in her work is the history of her great-great-grandmother, Roonia, who migrated from Calcutta to Guyana in 1865 as an indentured laborer. She recalls the journey mirroring the spirit of her father's own immigration from Trinidad to Canada.

In her 2021 work Illuminated, McKenzie utilized LED ceramic lightboxes and porcelain tiles to display historical portraits of "coolie belles"—indentured South Asian women whose photographs were heavily commodified by the 19th-century Caribbean tourist industry. By embedding an archival image of Roonia into the installation, McKenzie locates her own position within the diasporic narrative. Roonia’s history is further explored in House of Cards (2019), a series consisting of iron-oxide photographic decals transferred onto porcelain substrates; the fragile structural arrangement of the pieces mirrors the precarity of historical memory. McKenzie also addresses the physical realities of transatlantic migration in First Wave (2021), a sculptural recreation of the Fatel Razack (or Futtle Rozack), the ship that transported the first 225 Indian indentured laborers from Calcutta to Trinidad in 1845. These themes culminated in her 2023 solo exhibition, Reclaimed: Indo-Caribbean HerStories, at the Gardiner Museum in Toronto. Guided by the theories of Ariella Aïsha Azoulay, the installation subverts colonial-era postcards that historically commodified nameless indentured women. By transferring archival images and contemporary photos of their descendants onto ceramic tiles, McKenzie honors the historical defiance and matrilineal legacy of Indo-Caribbean women.

Family history and the lived experiences of racialization in Canada are central to McKenzie's artistic inquiries, particularly through the lens of her father's life as a migrant. Her work frequently unearths the systemic racism and resistance embedded in mid-century Canadian history. In her exhibition Brick by Brick: Absence vs. Presence at the Esplanade Arts and Heritage Centre in Medicine Hat, Alberta, McKenzie drew from histories of her father’s employment working the Stelco brick furnaces in Hamilton, Ontario, during the 1950s; there, workers of African and South Asian descent were routinely assigned to the hottest sections of the facility due to racialized misconceptions that darker-skinned individuals possessed a higher heat tolerance.

McKenzie later expanded this investigation into Canadian civil rights history by researching her father's presence at Sir George Williams University during the historic 1969 Sir George Williams riot—the largest student-led race protest in Canadian history. Her 2025–2026 solo multimedia exhibition, The Forgotten Man – Reckoning The Sir George Williams Protests, 1969, at the Centre Céramique Bonsecours in Montreal, served as a personal reckoning with her discovery that her father had supported the white biology professor whose academic discrimination catalyzed the uprising. Utilizing archival photographs, digital collage, and structural steel installations, the exhibition explored themes of Afro-Asian solidarity, historical memory, and generational trauma. To articulate the unstable nature of these narratives, McKenzie frequently turns to geometric structural precarity. In Postmarked (2017), she explored notions of "Canadiana" and her mixed-race upbringing by firing family archival photos onto unstable, 14-sided tetradecahedrons. Regarding these conceptual motivations, McKenzie has stated: "I want to tell the stories of my father’s family and of my life in order to add the under-represented voice of the mixed-race Indo-Caribbean to the canon."

Additionally, McKenzie has translated her personal experiences with illness, the body, and chronic pain into her work. During a 2014 residency at Guldagergaard in Denmark, she learned techniques for transferring photographic imagery onto clay, which she later deployed when health complications temporarily prevented her from wheel-throwing. This period informed her 2019 exhibition Family Matters at the Gardiner Museum. The body of work served as a means of locating her childhood identity within a virtually monolithically white milieu, while visually documenting her parents' historic endurance against instances of violent racism. The exhibition featured Boxed In (2016), a series of slip-cast polyhedron blocks bearing photographic fragments of her own body, which she juxtaposed against Body Interrupted (2016)—an intimate photographic study of her father’s body captured six months prior to his death, intended to parallel their shared physical struggles. Through these archival transfers, McKenzie also explored the irony of her ancestral lineages, noting how both sets of her great-grandparents in Ohio and Trinidad utilized a curated posturing of "ideal Victorianism" in historical portraits as a structural shield against colonial and racialized stratification.

== Exhibitions ==
=== Select solo exhibitions ===
- 2025–2026: The Forgotten Man – Reckoning The Sir George Williams Protests, 1969, Centre Céramique Bonsecours, Montreal, Quebec
- 2025: Reclaimed: Indo-Caribbean HerStories (Touring), Gallery 1C03, University of Winnipeg, Manitoba
- 2025: What We Inherit (Two-person exhibition with Natalie Hunter), Workers Arts & Heritage Centre, Hamilton, Ontario
- 2023: Reclaimed: Indo-Caribbean HerStories, Gardiner Museum, Toronto, Ontario
- 2023: tRaces (Two-person exhibition with Jeannie Mah), Moose Jaw Museum & Art Gallery, Moose Jaw, Saskatchewan
- 2022: Brick by Brick: Absence vs. Presence, Esplanade Arts and Heritage Centre, Medicine Hat, Alberta
- 2019: Whatever Will Be, Medalta Potteries, Medicine Hat, Alberta
- 2017: Spaces Within: The Oz Collection, Newington Armory, Sydney, Australia
- 2015: China Unbound, David Kaye Gallery, Toronto, Ontario
- 2013: Balancing Act, Gaya Ceramic Arts Center, Sayan, Bali, Indonesia

=== Select group exhibitions ===
- 2026: Linen Biennale Northern Ireland, Northern Ireland
- 2024: Girmitya HerStories, Indian International Ceramics Triennale, New Delhi, India
- 2024: Underneath Everything (Touring), Des Moines Art Center, Des Moines, Iowa, United States
- 2024: Breakthrough – Fusion's 50th Anniversary Exhibition, Canadian Clay and Glass Gallery, Waterloo, Ontario
- 2023: #CripClay, NCECA Concurrent Exhibition, Cincinnati, Ohio, United States
- 2021: Cladogram – KMA International Juried Exhibition, Katonah Museum of Art, Katonah, New York, United States
- 2020: Come Up to My Room, DesignTO, Gladstone Hotel, Toronto, Ontario
- 2019: 4th Cluj International Ceramics Biennial, Cluj, Romania
- 2019: Craft Forms – 25th International Juried Exhibition of Contemporary Fine Craft, Wayne Art Center, Wayne, Pennsylvania, United States
- 2019: Decolonizing Clay, Australian Ceramics Triennale, Tasmania, Australia
- 2017: 3rd Cluj International Ceramics Biennial, Cluj, Romania
- 2014: 4th International Triennial of Silicate Arts, Kecskemét, Hungary
- 2014: Transcending Materials – Potters Council Juried Exhibition, NCECA, Milwaukee, Wisconsin, United States
- 2012: Toronto International Art Fair, Toronto, Ontario (SAVAC booth)

== Selected artworks ==
Year	Title	Medium	Dimensions / Notes	Collection / Repository
2025	Blueprints	Screenprinted slips, ceramic decals, and rebar	Variable dimensions; Conceptual multi-media installation exploring the physical impact of labor and oil refinery production on her father's health.	Artist's collection (Exhibited at Workers Arts & Heritage Centre)
2021	Linenopolis	Photographic image transfers on porcelain	Variable dimensions; Mixed-media installation utilizing tiles shaped to mimic historical Jacquard loom punch cards to explore 19th-century industrial labor and the textile history of Belfast.	Artist's collection (Exhibited at Biennale internationale du lin de Portneuf)
2019-2022	Building Blocks	Stoneware and iron oxide photographic decals	36 × 18 × 18 in; Features 26 hand-built stoneware blocks balancing maternal and paternal ancestral imagery.	Gardiner Museum (Permanent Collection)
2021	Illuminated	Porcelain tiles, ceramic decals, LED lightboxes	Variable dimensions; Depicts archival portraits of Indo-Caribbean indentured women ("coolie belles").	Royal Ontario Museum (Permanent Collection)
2021	First Wave	Sculptural porcelain installation	Variable dimensions; A structural recreation of the Fatel Razack, the first ship to transport South Asian migrants to Trinidad.	Royal Ontario Museum (Permanent Collection)
2020	Division	Porcelain, iron oxide decals, plexiglass, acrylic, wood, and metal hinges	165 × 84 × 3.75 cm; A formal partition screen exploring systemic and colonial racial inequities.	Exhibited at Des Moines Art Center
2019	House of Cards	Porcelain substrates and iron oxide photographic decals	26 porcelain substrate "cards", 4.5 × 6.5 in each; Stacking arrangement depicting her great-great-grandmother Roonia.	Private collection
2017	Postmarked	Slip-cast porcelain, ceramic decals, and acrylic	21 blocks, 15 × 15 × 15 cm each; 14-sided tetradecahedrons featuring family archives and iconic Canadian imagery.	Global Affairs Canada (Acquired 2019)
2016	Boxed In (formerly Moving Forward)	Slip-cast porcelain and iron oxide decals	15 irregular cubes, 11 × 11 × 11 cm each; Autobiographical self-portraiture depicting fragments of the artist's body.	Artist's collection
2016	Body Interrupted	Earthenware, ceramic decals, aircraft cable, and raku-fired rings	150 × 150 × 3 cm mobile strands; Abstract portrait of the physical frailty and resilience of her late father.	Permanent installation variable

== Selected bibliography ==
In addition to her visual art practice, McKenzie works actively as a ceramic scholar, art critic, and arts journalist. Her written work addresses topics in contemporary craft history, mixed-race identity, and the material cultures of the South Asian diaspora.

=== Books and academic chapters ===
- 2022: "Liminal Lives: Documenting the Inheritance of Post-Indentureship from the Caribbean to Canada" – Indenture Papers, Trinidad.
- 2022: "Grace Nickel’s Eruptions: Regrowth and Reimagining" – In Eruptions, Grace Nickel, University of Winnipeg Press.
- 2021: "The Colour of Our Skin" – Topia: Canadian Journal of Cultural Studies, University of Toronto Press.
- 2021: "Liminality – the works of Monica Mercedes Martinez, PJ Anderson and Habiba El-Sayed" – In Craft is Political (ed. D. Wood), Bloomsbury Press.
- 2014: Face Value: Exploring the Inter-subjectivity of Mixed-Race Identity Through the Works of Jordan Clarke, Erika DeFreitas, and Olivia McGilchrist (MFA Thesis) – OCAD University.

=== Selected arts journalism and essays ===
- 2024: "Speaking Volumes: The Work of Magdolene Odundo" – Ceramics Monthly (October issue).
- 2023: "Reclaimed: Indo-Caribbean HerStories" – Stabroek News (In the Diaspora), Guyana.
- 2022: "Cannupa Hanska Luger: Engaging Community" – Ceramics Monthly (May issue).
- 2020: "Materials, Making and Movement with Sandy Lockwood" – Ceramics Monthly (January issue).
- 2019: "Decolonising Clay" – Journal of Australian Ceramics, Vol. 58, No. 1.
- 2018: "The Art of Everyday Storytelling: Hermannsburg Pottery" – Ceramics Monthly (November issue).
- 2017: "Paradox: Identity & Belonging" – Ceramics Monthly (March issue).

== Awards and recognition ==
=== Honours and juried awards ===
- 2026: Awarded the International Academy of Ceramics (IAC) Special Residencies Project Prize, Longquan Wangou Art Centre, China
- 2022: Inducted as a member of the International Academy of Ceramics (AIC-IAC)
- 2022: Finalist, RBC Emerging Ceramic Artist Award (Shantz Award), Canadian Clay and Glass Gallery
- 2020: NCECA Helene Zucker Seeman Curatorial, Research, and Critical Writing Fellowship for Women
- 2019: Craft Ontario Award (Tucker’s Pottery Supplies House)
- 2017: Named an "Emerging Artist" by Ceramics Monthly magazine
- 2017: Craft Ontario Award
- 2011: Untapped Emerging Artist Award, Toronto Artist Project

=== Grants and fellowships ===
- 2025: Margaret Laurence Endowment Fund Community Grant
- 2024: Ontario Arts Council Visual Artists Creation Project Grant
- 2019: Canada Council for the Arts, Explore and Create Visual Artist Grant
- 2019: Toronto Arts Council, Grant to Mid-Career Visual Artists
- 2017: Ontario Arts Council, International Artist Residency Grant (Sydney, Australia)

== Personal life ==
McKenzie’s partner is filmmaker and activist Ali Kazimi, whom she met in the fall of 1994. She has referenced his work and practice as being “profoundly impactful” on her life. They live together in Toronto.

She is fluent in French.
