= Mirela =

Mirela is a Southern and Eastern European feminine given name with a Latin origin, cognate to Mirella.

== People ==
Notable persons with that name include:

- Mirela (singer) (born 1990), Spanish singer
- Mirela Balić (born 1999), Spanish actress
- Mirela Brekalo (born 1956), Croatian actress
- Mirela Cabero García (born 1990), Spanish singer known mononymously as Mirela
- Mirela Delibegovic, British virologist originally from Bosnia and Herzegovina
- Mirela Demireva (born 1989), Bulgarian high jumper
- Mirela Dulgheru (born 1966), Romanian-Turkish Olympian long jumper
- Mirela Holy (born 1971), Croatian politician
- Mirela Kumbaro (born 1966), Albanian politician
- Mirela Maniani (born 1976), Greek Olympian track and field athlete
- Mirela Nichita-Pașca (born 1985), Romanian handballer
- Mirela Roznoveanu (born 1947), Romanian-American literary critic, writer, and journalist
- Mirela Rupic (born 1967), American costume and fashion designer
- Mirela Țugurlan (born 1979), Romanian artistic gymnast

== Ships ==
MV Mirela, a Canadian ferry in service 1986-87
