= Walt Konarski =

Profile
- Position: Tackle

Personal information
- Born: July 4, 1929; Winnipeg, Manitoba
- Died: August 26, 2010 (aged 81); Winnipeg, Manitoba
- Listed height: 6 ft 2 in (1.88 m)
- Listed weight: 220 lb (100 kg)

Career history
- 1950–1952: Winnipeg Blue Bombers

Walter Konarski (July 4, 1929 – August 26, 2010) was a Canadian professional football player who played for the Winnipeg Blue Bombers. He previously played for the Winnipeg Light Infantry.
