= Muriel Millard =

Canadian actress, dancer, painter and singer-songwriter

- Born: December 3, 1922; Montreal, Quebec, Canada
- Died: November 30, 2014 (aged 91); Montreal, Quebec, Canada
- Occupations: Actress; Dancer; Painter; Singer-songwriter
- Years active: 1935–2011
- Spouse: Jean Paul
- Children: 2

Muriel Millard (December 3, 1922 – November 30, 2014) was a Canadian actress, dancer, painter, and singer-songwriter. She began her career in show business at age 13, which began in earnest following a win in a CKAC radio talent program. Millard recorded albums and singles in French and went on tours in Canada and abroad as well as appearing in nightclubs in Canada and the United States. She was omnipresent on Canadian radio stations and also featured on CBC Television programs. Millard retired from full-time work in show business in 1969, and became devoted to painting still lifes and clowns. She was inducted into the Canadian Songwriters Hall of Fame in 2007 through her song Dans nos vieilles maisons from the 1960 LP Miss music-hall datant.

== Early life ==
Millard was born on December 3, 1922, in Montreal, Quebec. She was the daughter of the Port of Montreal superintendent and her mother was a housewife. Millard was the oldest child in a family of eight siblings. When she was 13 years old, she began a career at the National Theater (now called The National), and won the talent program Catelli Young Talent (French: Les Jeunes Talents Catelli) on the Montreal radio station CKAC in 1938.

== Career ==
The success in the talent program began Millard's career in earnest. In 1942, she released the French-language single Y a pas de cerises en Alaska and was successful enough to bring her wide fame. Millard toured with the troupe of Jean Grimaldi in Quebec over the course of the Second World War, imitating fellow French-speaking female performers such as Josephine Baker, Lucienne Boyer, Mireille, and Mistinguett. She performed at Broadway's Old Europe nightclub from 1943 to 1945, and was omnipresent on Canadian radio stations such as CKAC, CKVL, Radio-Canada. In 1950, Millard was named "queen of radio" by the Montréal weekly Radiomonde due to her success on the platform. She subsequently toured New England and Quebec, before she went to Japan and Korea to entertain troops in the Canadian Armed Forces.

During this period, Millard frequently appeared in clubs in Quebec and as far as Florida. With the introduction of television in Canada, she was featured on the CBC Television programs Pique trump, Feux de joie, Open Door and Le Club des autographes. In 1955, Millard began presenting the CKVL radio program L'heure du Coke and occasionally performed on La chanson du Québec. At the conclusion of the 1950s, her music hall shows had grown to be more costly and more elaborate. For both 1960 and 1961, Millard was voted the most popular singer at the Montreal Radio-Television Gala. She appeared in Montreal variety shows at Place des Arts, the Montreal Forum, and the Comedie Canadienne. Post-1960, she authored the majority of her songs, such as Hymne du Québec, which was for a 1965 Télé-Métropole competition and subsequently made the theme for CKAC.

In 1966, Millard's performance of Gai Gai la belle province was repeated by her at Quebec City's Palais Montcalm. That same year, she was featured in Louiguy's French comedy La Quincaillère de Chicago at Montreal's St-Denis Theatre. Other productions that Millard was in included Vive la Canadienne at Expo 67, Terre des femmes at both the Comédie-Canadienne and New York City's Latin Quarter in 1968. During this period, she wrote and recorded more than 200 songs. In 1969, Millard lodged a formal complaint with the Department of External Affairs about the treatment she received during a tour of South America called Women's World Show with no payments being given to her or her troupe while in Uruguay. A lawyer was able to secure her release from a prison cell and provided her with a loan to enable her return to Canada.

Millard retired full-time from show business in 1969 and slowly began to devote her time to painting. She did so because her husband had become quite unwell and she could no longer perform in quality shows. Millard painted still lifes and clowns, and according to Montreal Gazette "became one of the rare Quebec painters to live well from her art." She briefly returned to the nightclub scene in 1970 and made rare appearances on television variety programs. Millard recorded the LP Faut que jeunesse se passe in 1975 and went on to record other LPs for the Trans-Canada label. She had a role in Marcel Lefebvre's 1975 film Mustang and participated in the program Bye Bye. Millard ceased painting from March 2011 following a stroke that reduced her mobility.

== Personal life ==
Millard was married to dancer Jean Paul, with whom she had two children. Her Montreal apartment caught fire in June 2007, destroying everything but her paintings. Millard died at Fleury Hospital in Montreal of old age, on the evening of November 30, 2014. She was given a two-hour funeral service at the Mary, Queen of the World Cathedral, Montreal, on the afternoon of December 6, attended by fellow singers, her friends and family.

== Legacy ==
Millard was named "French Canada's Miss Music Hall". Daniel Rolland of La Presse wrote of her: "A generous woman on stage as in the city, Muriel Millard, whom the public had crowned as the queen of the music hall, wanted more than anything to be loved. And she did not hesitate to put in the means." In 2007, she was inducted into the Canadian Songwriters Hall of Fame through her song Dans nos vieux maisons from the 1960 LP Miss music-hall datant. A black-and-white photograph of Millard by an unknown artist is in the collection of the National Museum of African American History and Culture as part of the Laura Cathrell Show-Down Magazine Collection.
