= Ian Kagedan =

Ian Kagedan (March 2, 1955 – February 17, 2014) was a Canadian public servant known for his work on inter-religious and inter-ethnic relations. Formerly National Director of Government Relations of B'nai Brith Canada He was appointed to serve on the Immigration and Refugee Board of Canada.

Kagedan, who was born in Montreal, Quebec, Canada, was educated at Columbia University and at the Jewish Theological Seminary of America in New York City. He died in February 2014 at the age of 58.

== Positions ==
Kagedan is noted for arguing that Hate propaganda can do damage by changing attitudes "even when the audience is unreceptive."

Kagedan has supported the Canadian ban on telephone hate messages, saying that, "It is not a matter of free speech. It is poison."

== Awards ==
Kagedan is a recipient of the 125th Anniversary of the Confederation of Canada Medal (January 1993).
