= Helen Gardiner =

Canadian philanthropist and co-founder of the Gardiner Museum of Ceramic Art

- Born: July 18, 1938; Kirkland Lake, Ontario, Canada
- Died: July 22, 2008 (aged 70); Caledon East, Ontario, Canada
- Resting place: Mount Pleasant Cemetery, Toronto
- Occupations: Art Collector, Philanthropist
- Known for: Gardiner Museum
- Spouse: George R. Gardiner
- Children: 1
- Awards: Order of Canada (2007)

Helen Elsie Elizabeth Gardiner CM (née McMinn) (July 18, 1938 – July 22, 2008) was a Canadian philanthropist and co-founder of the Gardiner Museum of Ceramic Art in Toronto, Ontario.

== Biography ==
Helen Gardiner was born in 1938 in the Northern mining town of Kirkland Lake to a working family. She later moved to Toronto where her father was employed by General Electric. In 1974, she began attending York University as a mature student, and in 1979, she travelled to London, England to study at Christie's Education.

Helen was married to prominent Toronto businessman George R. Gardiner, with whom she co-founded the Gardiner Museum of Ceramic Art. Between 1976 and 1984, George and Helen built a distinctive collection of approximately 1,200 objects in a few carefully selected areas that were collected in depth: ancient Central and South American vessels and figures; tin glazed pottery of the Italian Renaissance; seventeenth-century English pottery; and eighteenth-century European porcelain.

In 1981, the Ontario government unanimously passed Bill 183 to establish the George R. Gardiner Museum of Ceramic Art as an independent, public institution. It was officially opened in 1984 on the grounds of Victoria University, Toronto. "George and I built the museum and gave our collection to the people of Canada, but it was our hope that the Gardiner Museum would contribute in a meaningful way to the understanding and appreciation of ceramic art worldwide."

Helen was awarded the Order of Canada in 2007.

She died of pancreatic cancer in 2008 at her home in Caledon.
