= Georges Hamel =

Country music singer from Quebec

Georges Hamel (20 January 1948 – 26 February 2014) was a Canadian country music singer and songwriter from Quebec.

Hamel was born in Sainte-Françoise, Centre-du-Québec, Quebec, Canada. Over the course of his 40-year career, Hamel recorded 44 LPs, won four Félix Awards from ADISQ and sold over two million records.

In 2014, Hamel was the recipient of the Excellence Award at the Francophone SOCAN Awards held in Montreal.

He died in Drummondville, Centre-du-Québec in February 2014, at the age of 66.
