= Sherri Wood =

Canadian journalist

Sherri Wood (1979 – March 24, 2008) was a Canadian journalist for the Toronto Sun. An Etobicoke, Ontario native, Wood worked for the Sun since 2004 as an entertainment reporter and critic. She also had a weekly spot on Canoe Live, SUN TV's current-affairs show. The last story Wood wrote for the Sun was on April 15, 2007, a review of a concert by Brooklyn indie-rock troupe Clap Your Hands Say Yeah. Within hours of filing, she collapsed suddenly and was rushed to hospital.

== Death ==
On March 24, 2008 Wood died of brain cancer after an 11-month battle. Several tributes were posted by her former colleagues including Sun writers Bill Harris and Kathy Brooks and several others. Her sister Kayla Wood also posted tributes.
