= Jerome Weber =

Canadian abbot (1915–2008)

- Abbot of St. Peter-Muenster of Saskatchewan, Canada
- Church: Roman Catholic Church
- See: Territorial abbot of St. Peter-Muenster
- In office: 1970–1989
- Predecessor: Severinus Giacomo Gertken
- Successor: Peter Wilfred Novecosky
- Previous post(s): Priest

Orders
- Ordination: June 8, 1941

Personal details
- Born: September 14, 1915; Muenster, Saskatchewan, Canada
- Died: September 4, 2008 (aged 92); Muenster, Saskatchewan, Canada

Jerome Weber OSB (September 14, 1915 – September 4, 2008) was a Canadian abbot of the Roman Catholic Church.

Weber was born in Muenster, Saskatchewan, Canada in 1915 and ordained a priest on June 8, 1941 in the Order of Saint Benedict. He was elected Abbot of St. Peter-Muenster on April 6, 1960 and the election was confirmed on June 28, 1960. Abbot Jerome Weber retired from St. Peter-Muenster on June 15, 1990.

== See also ==
- Order of Saint Benedict
