= Winnipeg International Children's Festival =

- Frequency: Yearly
- Locations: The Forks, Winnipeg, Manitoba, Canada
- Years active: 43
- Inaugurated: 1983
- Previous event: June 7th to 10th 2012
- Next event: June 6th to June 9th
- Attendance: Over 40,000
- Budget: $750,000
- Website: http://kidsfest.ca

The Winnipeg International Children's Festival, also known as Kidsfest, is a children's festival held annually at The Forks National Historic Park. The festival is run by "Winnipeg International Children's Festival", which is a charitable, non-profit, community-based organization.

== Statistics ==
The Festival boasts over 1,000 volunteers, general admission exceeding 40,000 people and a budget as high as $750,000.

== History ==
Founded in 1983, it was held at Assiniboine Park, then at Kildonan Park from 1984 through 1989, and eventually moving to its present location in 1990. The festival is made up of over 30 acts, held over four days, totalling about 120 performances. In 2008, the festival received up to $100,000 in federal funding through the Arts Presentation Canada program of the Department of Canadian Heritage. In 2011, 2012, and 2013, the festival received $100,000 of federal funding from the Canada Arts Presentation Fund.

Musician Bill Merritt, a Canadian rock bassist, was director of the Festival, which he co-founded. He died at age 66 from brain cancer on March 25, 2014 at Riverview Health Centre, Winnipeg. He was survived by his wife and two children.
