= Roy Killin =

Canadian soccer player

Personal information
- Full name: Harold Roy Killin
- Date of birth: 18 July 1929 (age 97)
- Place of birth: Toronto, Ontario
- Height: 5 ft 9 in (1.75 m)
- Position: Full back

Senior career*
Years	Team	Apps	(Gls)
1947–1952	Manchester United	0	(0)
1952–1954	Lincoln City	7	(0)
1954–1958	Peterborough United	101	(0)
- * Club domestic league appearances and goals

Harold Roy Killin (born 18 July 1929), known as Roy Killin, is a former professional footballer who played as a full back in the Football League for Manchester United and Lincoln City. and finally with Peterborough United from 1954 to 1958. He was born in Toronto, Ontario, Canada and raised in Manchester, England.

In 1947, he was signed by his hometown team, Manchester United, but never appeared for the first team. In the 1953–54 season, he played ten games (seven in the League) for Second Division side Lincoln City. He also played for non-league team Peterborough United.

== Career ==
In 1947, he began playing for Manchester United Junior teams. In 1949, he became a full professional playing mainly in the reserve and "A" teams. He had no first team appearances. In 1952, he transferred to Second Division Lincoln City where he had ten first team appearances. Killin began playing for non-league Peterborough United in 1954 and made 101 first team games.

His playing career was cut short due to an injury in 1958 when the doctor told Killin that continued treatment could cause permanent damage to his right knee and therefore suggested a complete rest from playing for an extended period of time. In 1962, Killin moved with his family to Toronto, Canada and played two more years as a semi-pro in the National League before retiring as a professional in 1964.
