= Armand Lemieux =

Canadian ice hockey player

Armand (Lem) Lemieux
- Born: July 7, 1926; Coniston, Ontario, Canada
- Died: December 30, 2015 (aged 89); Sudbury, Ontario Canada
- Height: 5 ft 10 in (178 cm)
- Weight: 160 lb (73 kg; 11 st 6 lb)
- Position: Left wing
- Shot: Left
- Played for: Providence Reds; Pittsburgh Hornets; Springfield Indians; Syracuse Warriors
- Playing career: 1943–1959

Armand Eli Lemieux (July 7, 1926 – December 30, 2015) was a Canadian professional hockey player who played for the Providence Reds, Pittsburgh Hornets, Springfield Indians and Syracuse Warriors in the American Hockey League.
