= J. Fenwick Lansdowne =

Canadian artist (1937–2008)

- Born: James Fenwick Lansdowne; August 8, 1937; Hong Kong
- Died: July 27, 2008 (aged 70)
- Awards: Order of Canada; Order of British Columbia RCA

James Fenwick Lansdowne, OC OBC RCA (August 8, 1937 – July 27, 2008) was a self-taught Canadian wildlife artist.

== Career ==
Lansdowne was born in Hong Kong of English parents and grew up in Victoria, British Columbia. Stricken with polio at eleven months, he was nurtured by his mother, Edith Lansdowne, to walk. A painter herself, she also provided his first lessons in painting and continued to supply whatever help she could. Later, in high school, the staff of the Royal British Columbia Museum encouraged him in studying birds, and gave him a job as a laboratory assistant for three summers. He held his first show in 1952 at the Royal British Columbia Museum when he was fourteen, his second show at the Royal Ontario Museum in 1956. He had his first international exhibition in New York in 1958 at the headquarters of the National Audubon Society. In 1960, he had an exhibition at the Art Gallery of Greater Victoria, then, in 1961, he had an exhibition at the Tryon Gallery (today's Rountree Tryon Gallery) in London, England. From then on, he exhibited his work in centres world-wide.

Lansdowne's creative process involved observation from life and from preserved specimens. His detailed watercolours of birds have frequently been compared with the work of John James Audubon – they often feature a specific species against a largely white background – but his subjects tend to display a greater lifelike quality and more natural postures than Audubon's. His work is in such public collections as the Royal Ontario Museum, the Montreal Museum of Fine Arts, the Beaverbrook Art Gallery, the Art Gallery of Greater Victoria and in the collection of the Princess Royal and Duke of Edinburgh. His work was presented to members of the British royal family by the Government of Canada.

In 1976, Lansdowne was made an Officer of the Order of Canada. In 1995, he was awarded the Order of British Columbia. In 1974, he was elected a member of the Royal Canadian Academy of Arts.

He died in Victoria, British Columbia, in 2008.

== Personal life ==
Since Lansdowne had polio, he walked with crutches and only could paint with his left hand.

== Publications ==
- Birds of the Northern Forest (1966) – text by John A. Livingston
- Birds of the Eastern Forest, Volume I (1968) – text by John A. Livingston
- Birds of the Eastern Forest, Volume II (1970) – text by John A. Livingston
- Birds of the West Coast, Volume I (1976)
- Rails of the World (1977) – text by S. Dillon Ripley
- Guide to the Behavior of Common Birds (1980) with Donald Stokes
- Birds of the West Coast, Volume II (1982)
