= Vern Jones =

Canadian ice hockey player (born 1926)

- Born: October 8, 1926 (age 98); Saskatoon, Saskatchewan, Canada
- Height: 5 ft 8 in (173 cm)
- Weight: 168 lb (76 kg; 12 st 0 lb)
- Position: Right wing
- Shot: Right
- Played for: Pittsburgh Hornets; Buffalo Bisons; Springfield Indians; Fort Worth Rangers; Seattle Ironmen; Vancouver Canucks; New Haven Blades; Charlotte Clippers
- Playing career: 1941–1962

Vernon "Wimpy" Jones (born October 8, 1926) is a Canadian retired professional hockey player who played 182 games for the Pittsburgh Hornets, Buffalo Bisons and Springfield Indians in the American Hockey League. He also played in the United States Hockey League with the Fort Worth Rangers for 89 games, in the Pacific Coast Hockey League for the Seattle Ironmen and Vancouver Canucks, and in the Eastern Hockey League for the New Haven Blades and Charlotte Clippers.
