= Zoe MacKinnon =

Canadian field hockey player

Zoe MacKinnon (October 5, 1959 in Toronto – January 29, 2014) was a Canadian field hockey player who competed in the 1984 Summer Olympics. MacKinnon, after surviving cancer once, lived with her partner Elizabeth Schieck in Guelph, Ontario on the Bank of the Speed River. She was also a member of the University of Toronto Hall of Fame. In 2025 MacKinnon was inducted into the Caledon Sports Hall of Fame.
