= Mirella Amato =

Canadian beer consultant

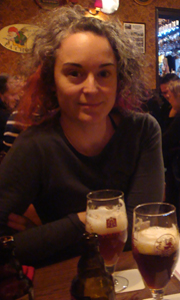
- Mirella Amato at café 't Brugs Beertje in Bruges

Personal details
- Occupation: Beer Consultant

Mirella Amato is a trilingual beer consultant, beer sommelier, and award-winning author based in Toronto, Ontario, a foremost specialist on beer, with a focus on education, sensory analysis, and beer and food pairing. She was the first woman in Canada to become a Certified Cicerone and, in 2012, became the first non-US resident to earn the Master Cicerone® certification. She is also the recipient of the 2012 Ontario Craft Brewers Centre of Excellence Industry Choice Award in Food & Beer Matching Development and in 2018 she was inducted into the Belgian brewers' Guild as an Honorary Knight of the Brewer's Paddle. In January 2025, Mirella became the second person in Canada and the first Master Cicerone to earn the title of Grand Master Judge with the Beer Judge Certification Program.

In 2008, Amato founded Beerology, a company through which she offers craft beer and sensory consulting services. Amato is the co-founder of the Toronto-based cask ale advocacy group Cask!. She is also the founder of the Toronto Chapters of the women-only international beer-appreciation society, Barley's Angels as well as its professional counterpart, the Pink Boots Society.

Amato has appeared on CBC Radio, Radio Canada, History Television, CityTV's Breakfast Television and Canada.com She also contributed a number of entries to the Oxford Companions to Beer. Her first book, Beerology: Everything You Need to Know to Enjoy Beer...Even More, published by Appetite by Random House, was released on May 27, 2014 and has been translated into French and German.

== Contributions to Beer & Food Pairing ==
Mirella specializes in pairing beer with food and has made several significant contributions in this space, which were first recognized in 2012 when she won the Ontario Craft Brewers Centre of Excellence Industry Choice Award in Food & Beer Matching Development.

In 2014, she introduced “Mirella’s rule of thumb”. This “general rule”, which was published in her book, Beerology: Everything You Need to Know to Enjoy Beer...Even More, states that, in a pinch, you can “line up the depth of colour of the beer with the colour of the main ingredient in the dish.” It has since been widely adopted, if not always attributed.

In December 2019, in part 3 of the YouTube series she called ‘Questioning Old Beer Habits”, Mirella outlined why the “3 Cs of food pairing” (cut, complement, contrast) should be revisited. These three ‘techniques’ had previously been thought of as three different ways to pairing beer with food. Mirella proposed that all three elements (cut, complement and contrast) should come together in order to create a successful pairing.

In October 2021, Mirella released an online course on pairing beer with food. In it, she proposes several updates to how beer and food pairing is approached. Among them are the necessity to identify multiple bridges in each pairing as well as the use of what she terms ‘flavour groups’ to identify bridges. In the course, she also published, for the first time, her theory on the three pairing dynamics (the meld, the dance and the third flavour), which she had been sharing in beer and food pairing talks and trainings since 2013.
