= Gertrude Story =

Canadian short story writer, poet and radio broadcaster (1929–2014)

- Born: Gertrude Elizabeth Wudrick; September 19, 1929; Bergheim, Saskatchewan, Canada
- Died: January 18, 2014 (aged 84); Weyburn, Saskatchewan
- Education: University of Saskatchewan
- Occupations: Poet; Radio broadcaster; Short story writer
- Spouse: Joseph LeRoy Story
- Children: 2

Gertrude Elizabeth Story (née Wudrick; September 19, 1929 – January 18, 2014) was a Canadian short story writer, poet and radio broadcaster. She began writing humorous stories and commentaries based on the rural German-Canadian Lutheran farming community she was raised in, in 1950. Story's works were broadcast on CBC Radio and did home-based literary reports for the network. authored multiple novels and published a poetry collection during the early 1980s to the early 1990s. She served as writer-in-residence of across various Canadian institutions and was an active member of the Saskatchewan Writers' Guild. The works of Story have been studied in Australian and German university classes.

== Early life and education ==
On September 19, 1929, Story was born in the Bergheim district, close to Sutherland, Saskatchewan, in Canada. She was the daughter of Rheinhold and Mathilda (Jabusch) Wudrick, and was raised in a German-Canadian Lutheran farming community, with three siblings. She left the Lutheran farming community at a young age and did not return. In 1976, Story matriculated to the University of Saskatchewan, graduating with a Bachelor of Arts degree with distinction in 1981. She earned the university's Arts Prize and President's Medal honours as the College of Arts and Science's most distinguished graduate.

== Career ==
Following the completion of her high school education, she began her career as a bank clerk. In 1950, having received encouragement from her husband to express herself in writing, she began to author funny stories and commentaries based on rural life she grew up in. Story's works were broadcast on CBC Radio, and she made literary reports from her Vanscoy, Saskatchewan home for the network. In 1978, she earned the Saskatchewan Culture & Youth Poetry Prize, giving her the W. O. Mitchell bursary, and a CBC Radio Literary Award two years later. She was named third prize winner in the short story category for But First You Ought to Ask The Bride at the 1981 CBC Literary Competition. Story's first book, which was a poem collection, The Book of Thirteen was published by Thistledown Press in 1981. The following year, she received the Saskatchewan Writers’ Guild Children's Literature Award.

Story's first novel, The Way to Always Dance, was published in 1983, followed by her second novel, It Never Pays to Laugh Too Much, a year later and her third novel, The Need of Wanting Always, in 1985. During 1986, she authored Black Swan and Rowena, Rowena, Rowena. Story published her autobiography, The Last House on Main Street, in 1988. Her final works, After Sixty: Going Home, and, How to Saw Wood with an Angel, were published in 1991 and 1992 respectively. From 1984 to 1985, Story was made writer-in-residence of Prince Albert by the Saskatchewan Writers' Guild as part of Saskatchewan's government resident artist program, the Saskatoon Public Library between September 1986 and July 1987, the University of Winnipeg in 1988, the Moose Jaw Public Library until July 1991, and was appointed the same role of the Yukon Territory in the North of Canada, serving from September 1991 to February 1992.

She was an active member of the Saskatchewan Writers' Guild. Story spent a lot of time teaching writing at sponsored workshops staged by the Guild and writer-in-residence programs. She conducted public speeches starting from 1979.

== Personal life ==
Story was married to the rural schoolteacher Joseph LeRoy Story, with whom she had two children, until his death in 1973. She died in Weyburn, Saskatchewan, on January 18, 2014. Story was given a direct cremation without a funeral service as per a request.

== Writing style and legacy ==
Verne Clemence of The StarPhoenix called Story's writing style as "Words such as 'growingess' characterize Story's writing style." Clemence further noted "The changes in the people in her new stories from those in her past books are subtle. But the distinctions are significant. Most in the new crop are serene. They've left behind the angst-ridden, 30-something years, where the preoccupations were making a living, fleeting romances and the stresses of the competitive, materialistic world."

The works of Story have been studied in Australian and German university classes. The University of Saskatchewan Archives and Special Collections held an exhibition displaying a collection of her works and information about the writer at the Murray Library from January to February 2014.
