= Gardiner Museum =

George R. Gardiner Museum of Ceramic Art
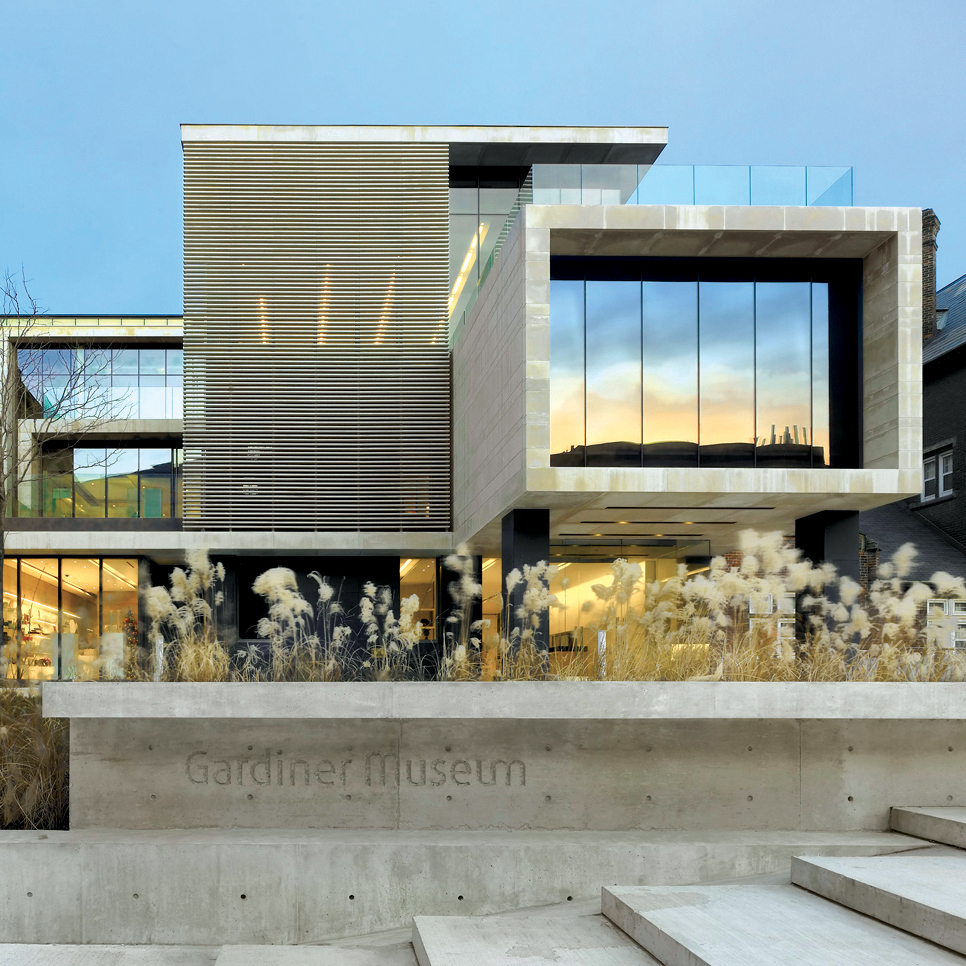
- Gardiner Museum from Queen's Park Crescent
- Established: 6 March 1984
- Location: 111 Queens Park Crescent, Toronto, Ontario, Canada
- Coordinates: 43.668163°N 79.393151°W
- Type: Ceramics museum
- Founders: George and Helen Gardiner
- CEO: Gabrielle Peacock
- Chairperson: James Appleyard
- Curator: Sequoia Miller (chief curator)
- Architects: Keith Wagland, KPMB Architects (2004–06 expansion); Urbacon (general contractor of 2004–06 expansion)
- Public transit access: Museum; Bay
- Website: www.gardinermuseum.on.ca

The George R. Gardiner Museum of Ceramic Art (commonly shortened to the Gardiner Museum) is a ceramics museum in Toronto, Ontario, Canada. The museum is situated within grounds of Victoria University on the University of Toronto's St. George campus. The 4,299.2-square-metre (46,276 sq ft) museum building was designed by Keith Wagland, with further expansions and renovations done by KPMB Architects and Urbacon.

The museum was established by George and Helen Gardiner, and was opened to the public on 6 March 1984. In 1987, management of the institution was assumed by the Royal Ontario Museum (ROM). The ROM continued to manage the Gardiner Museum until 1996, when an additional endowment to the museum allowed it to reincorporate as an independent institution. In 2004, the museum was closed to the public, in order to accommodate renovations to the building. The museum was reopened to the public in 2006, shortly after renovations to its building were completed by construction management firm Urbacon. The museum again underwent significant renovation, particularly to the ground floor and permanent collection galleries, from 2024 to late 2025; The renovation included the creation of the first gallery permanently dedicated to Indigenous ceramics in the museum's history.

The museum's permanent collection of ceramics includes over 4,000 pieces. The collection is made up of two types of ceramics, earthenware and porcelain. In addition to exhibits for its collection, the museum has organized and hosted a number of contemporary ceramic art exhibitions. The museum is affiliated with the Canadian Heritage Information Network, Canadian Museums Association, and the Virtual Museum of Canada.

== History ==
In the early 1980s, George and Helen Gardiner hoped to exhibit their works at the Royal Ontario Museum, although complications in arranging that led them to open their own institution instead. A building was constructed in 1983 with the Gardiner Museum opening to the public on 6 March 1984. In order to help facilitate the maintenance of the future museum, a volunteer committee was formed in 1983, from volunteers of the Royal Ontario Museum. The Gardiner Volunteer Committee was formed to discuss training of future museum volunteers, with its first formal meeting held shortly after the museum opened on 28 March 1984.

The museum began offering public tours of its exhibits in spring 1985. Due to financial reasons, George arranged for the Royal Ontario Museum to take over management of the institution in 1987. However, after receiving another financial endowment from the Gardiner family in 1996, as well as financial support from federal and provincial programs, the Gardiner Museum formally separated from the ROM, and reestablished itself as an independent institution on 1 January 1997. Following its establishment as an independent institution, management of the museum was assumed by an independent Board of Trustees, made up of five members from Victoria University's Board of Regents, one member from Toronto City Council, and nine individuals selected from the Government of Ontario through the Lieutenant Governor in Council. (Note: As outlined in the George R. Gardiner Museum of Ceramic Art Act, 1990, two of the nine individuals initially selected by the Lieutenant Governor in Council shall be George and Helen Gardiner.) During that same year, the museum closed for six weeks in order to accommodate minor renovations to the building.

In 2000, George approached Bruce Kuwabara to design and install a ceramics exhibition for the museum. The success of the installation installed by Kuwabara led to him being commissioned to redesign, and expand the museum building. In January 2004, the museum closed its building to the public in order to accommodate renovations to its first two floors, and the construction of a third floor to the building. However, during this period the museum maintained a temporary administrative office on 60 McCaul Street, as well as continued to host educational programs and exhibitions in other temporary facilities. The museum was reopened to the public in June 2006, although the redevelopment was not fully completed until 2008.

In an effort to attract more visitors, and to further utilize its personal collection, the museum launched an art intervention program in 2012. In 2013, the museum placed a permanent installation, a striped-head sculpture by Jun Kaneko on the plaza of its property. Another public art installation, Cracked Wheat by Shary Boyle, was installed in the museum's courtyard in 2018.

== Architecture ==
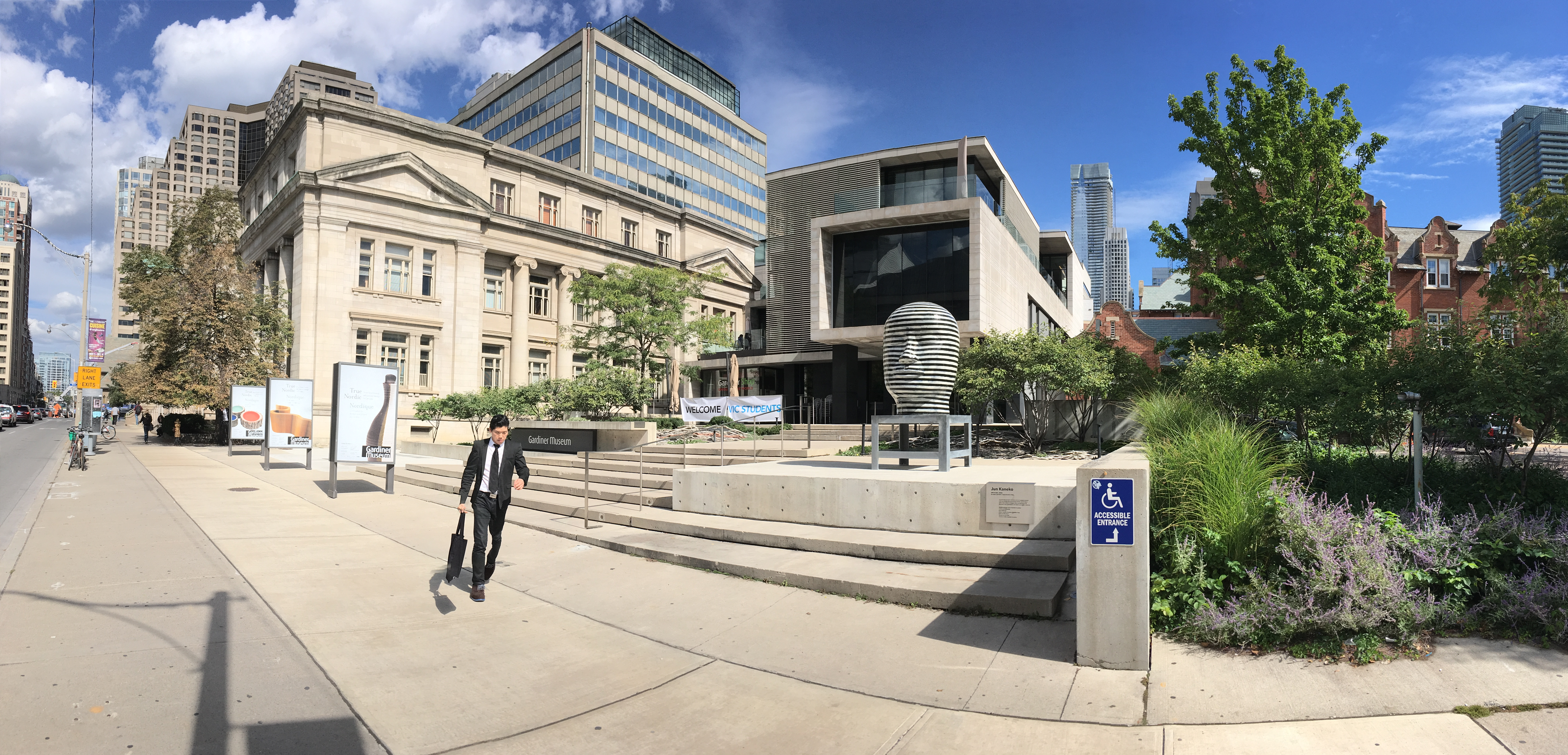
The museum's building is built on the backcourt of its property, in order to provide the area an unobstructed view of the Lillian Massey Building.

The 4,299.2-square-metre (46,276 sq ft) museum building is located at Queen's Park Crescent, on the grounds of Victoria University, a federated college of the University of Toronto on its St. George campus. Museum station is the nearest Toronto subway station to the museum.

Completed in 1983, the building was at the cost of C$6 million. The building was originally only 2,969.0 square metres (31,958 sq ft), and two storeys, although was designed to accommodate the construction of an additional floor. Designed by Keith Wagland, the neoclassical modernist building's was designed and position on the property's back court to provide the surrounding area an unobstructed view of the building adjacent to the museum, the Lillian Massey Building. The building itself cantilevered towards Queen's Park. From the building's completion, to the building's redevelopment in the early 2000s, the building featured a modest pink granite facade.

From January 2004 to June 2006, the museum closed to the public to undertake a C$25 million renovation and expansion of the building. (Note: The museum's redevelopment by KPMB Architects was originally budgeted for C$15 million, although its budget was later expanded by an addition C$10 million.) Although it reopened in 2006, the museum's development project was not completed until 2008. Bruce Kuwabara served as the redevelopment's design partner, whereas Shirley Blumberg served as the partner-in-charge of the architectural firm's redevelopment of the Gardiner. As a part of the redevelopment, the building's exterior facade was re-clad with Indiana limestone and black granite, adorned with sharp vertically placed windows. KPMB choose to re-clad the building in limestone in order to match the facade of the Lillian Massey building, in addition to scaling the museum to blend with the Annesley Hall's bay windows to the south of the museum

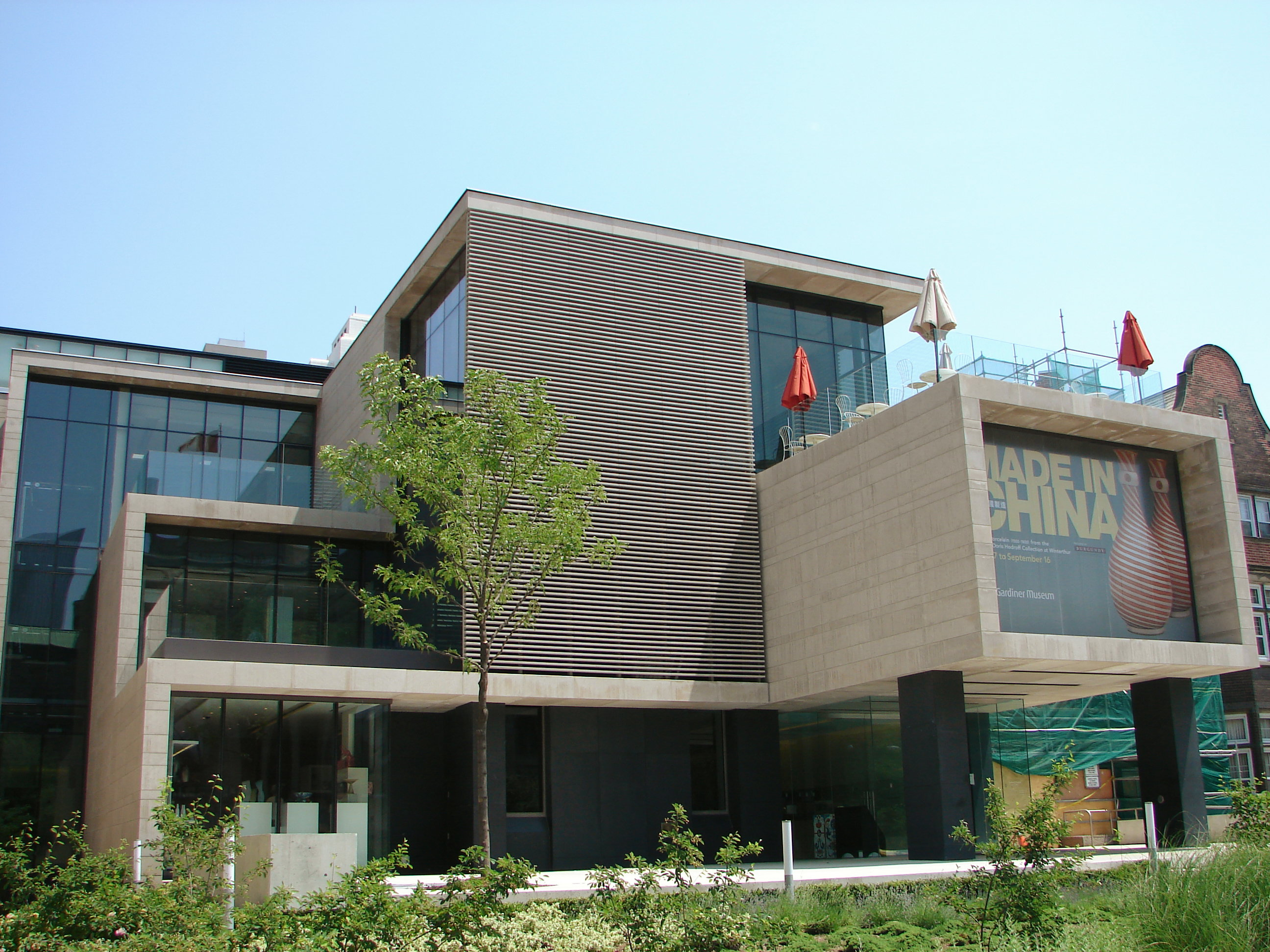
The exterior facade of the museum is made of Indiana limestone, black granite, and glass

The redevelopment also saw the construction of a third floor to the building, increasing the building's size by 1,330.2 square metres (14,318 sq ft). The third floor included facilities for a 50-seat restaurant, a L-shaped outdoor terrace, and a 370-square-metre (4,000 sq ft) exhibition gallery. Renovations to the interior of the existing building included a redesigned lobby features a long white oak reception desk, designed to draw guests into the museum; and renovations to its three galleries, educational facilities, and the museum's gift shop. Exhibit space within the museum was also increased, with the architectural firm placing an emphasis on highlighting the vitrines and pieces within them, as opposed to creating spaces for large receptions. The vitrines used to exhibits its pieces were also redesigned by the architectural firm. Farrow & Ball have provided the paint used for the museum's exhibits, and special exhibitions.

In 2017, KPMB Architects was contracted to redesign the museum's gift shop, and for lobby to feature an artist-in-residence ceramic studio at grade.

== Permanent collection ==
Under the institution's governing legislation, the George R. Gardiner Museum of Ceramic Art Act, the institution's objective is to collect, conserve, lend, and exhibit works of ceramic, decorative, and fine art and materials. As of July 2019, the Gardiner Museum's permanent collection included over 4,000 objects. The museum's permanent collection includes objects that were donated, purchased, or bequested to the museum, and are held in trust of the public. Items from the permanent collection are either exhibited in the museum, or are stored in a secure, climate controlled facility when not on display.

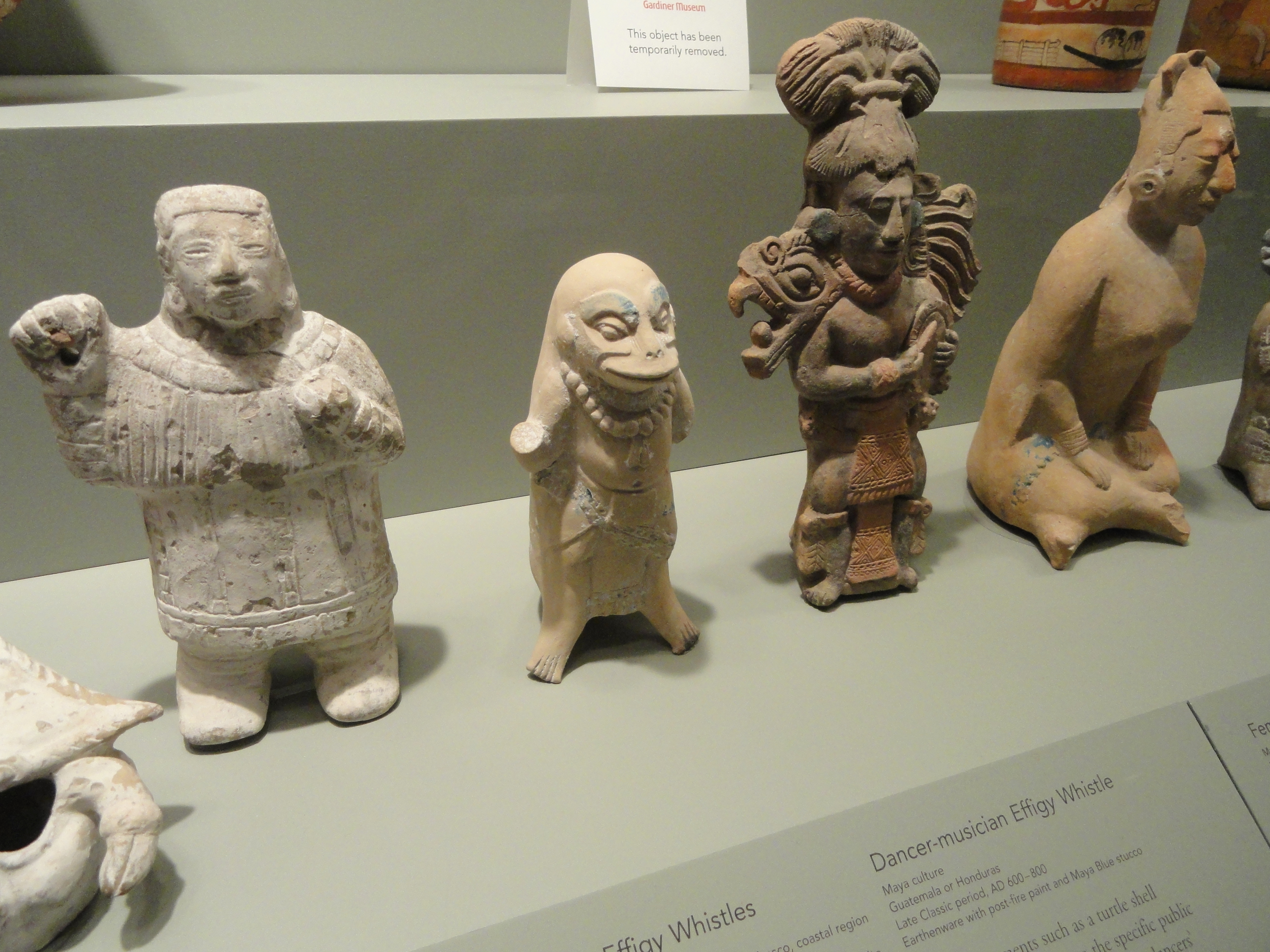
Several pieces of Maya earthenware on exhibit

The museum divides its collection into two principal collection areas, earthenware, and porcelain objects. The museum's collection of earthenware is primarily made up of ceramics from pre-colonial Americas, Italian maiolica, and English delftware; whereas the museum's porcelain collection primarily focuses on porcelains of European origins. In addition to regionally focused collection areas, the museum also features a specialized collection of earthenware and porcelain made for export to Canada. The museum's collection also includes a number of modern and contemporary ceramic pieces from the 1950s to the 21st century. Although the museum is primarily a ceramics museum, the museum's permanent collection also includes a number of non-ceramic pieces that directly relate to the ceramic pieces it has in its collection.

The museum's permanent collection of ceramic art originated from the private collections George and Helen Gardiner, who began their collection in the mid-1970s. The first pieces collected by the Gardiners was pre-colonial pottery from the Americas, and Meissen porcelain. Eventually, the Gardiners' private collection grew to include Italian maiolica, English delftware, as well as a variety of pottery pieces of pre-colonial Americas, and European porcelains.

=== Earthenware ===
The museum's collection of earthenware includes pieces from 47 different cultures in pre-colonial Americas, dating from 3500 BCE to 1550 CE. These works date back to 3,500 BCE to 1550 CE, most of which originated from the American southwest, Central America, Mesoamerica, and South America. The museum's collection also includes a number of European earthenware, dating from the 14th to 18th centuries. European earthenware includes pieces of creamwares, faïences from France, English delftware, Italian maiolicas, English slipwares.

=== Porcelain ===
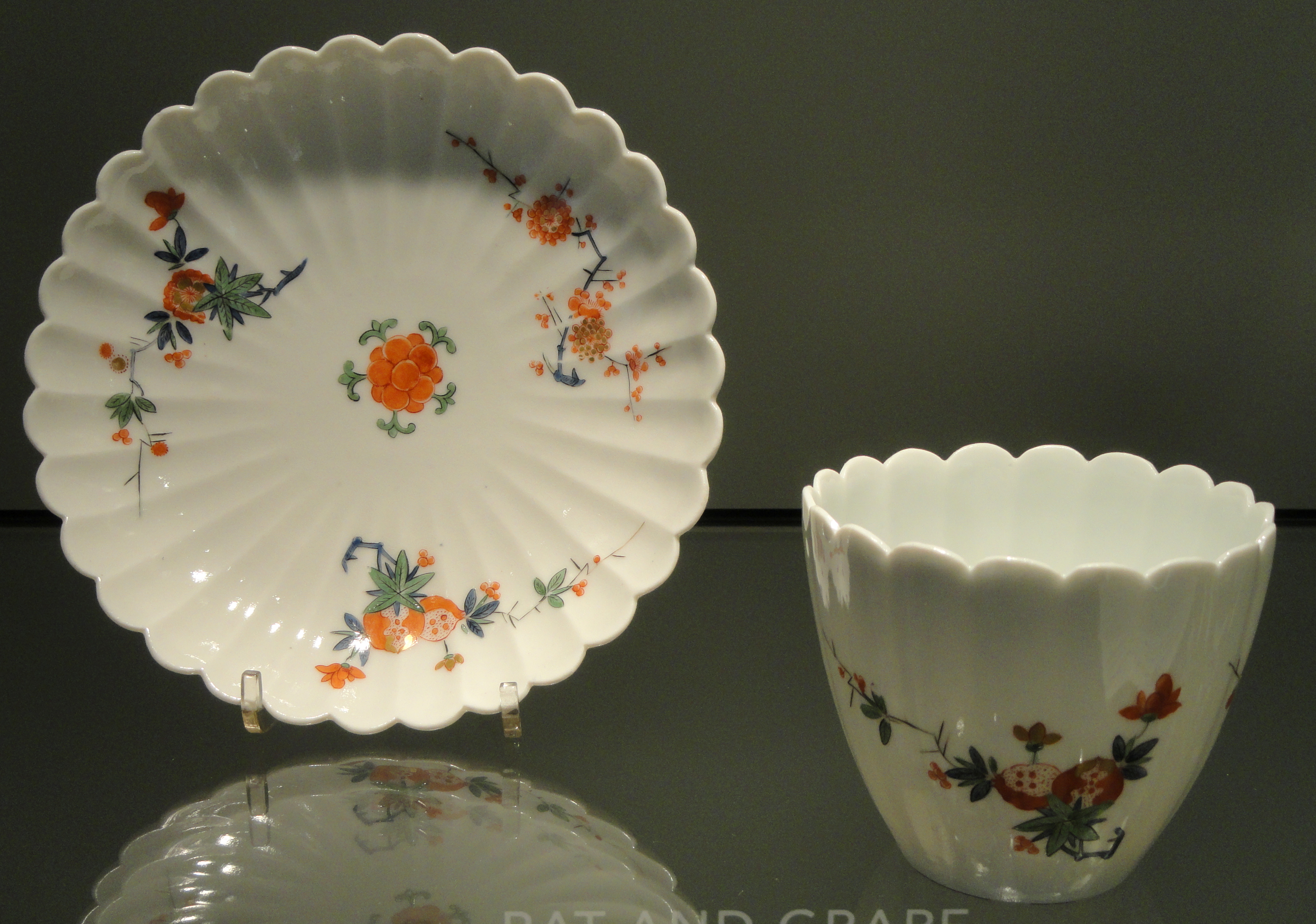
A Meissen porcelain cup and saucer (c. 1730) on exhibit

Porcelains from Meissen were among the first pieces acquired by George and Helen Gardiner. The museum's collection of European porcelains includes pieces from the 18th and 19th centuries. The museum's holdings of European ceramics from the 18th and early 19th century includes pieces from Austrian, English, French, German, Italian, and Swiss porcelain manufacturers based in Europe; in addition to hausmaler decorated pieces, and commedia dell’arte figurines. The museum's holdings of European porcelains in the 19th century include pieces from Mintons, a producer of hybrid porcelain known as bone china.

In addition to European porcelains, the museum's collection also includes a variety of porcelains from China, and Japan, including a number of Chinese blue and white porcelains.

== Library ==
The museum operates the Gail Brooker Ceramic Research Library within its building, with the library being managed as a part of the University of Toronto Library System. The library was established by the museum in 1988, after George R. Gardiner donated 387 books, engravings, journals, and periodicals relating to the museum. Its holdings has since expanded to include 2,500 volumes.

Although the library is open to the public, its holdings form a part of a non-circulating research collection, with visitors unable to borrow items for use outside the library.

== Programs ==
The museum hosts, and organizes a number of travelling exhibitions. In addition to exhibiting ceramic art, the institution also offers educational programming at the museum, including a two-hour drop-in pottery class throughout the year.

== See also ==
- List of art museums
- List of museums in Toronto
