= 1922 in Canada =

- Decades: 1900s; 1910s; 1920s; 1930s; 1940s
- See also: History of Canada; Timeline of Canadian history; List of years in Canada

Events from the year 1922 in Canada.

== Incumbents ==
=== Crown ===
- Monarch – George V

=== Federal government ===
- Governor General – Julian Byng
- Prime Minister – William Lyon Mackenzie King
- Chief Justice – Louis Henry Davies (Prince Edward Island)
- Parliament – 14th (from 8 March)

=== Provincial governments ===
==== Lieutenant governors ====
- Lieutenant Governor of Alberta – Robert Brett
- Lieutenant Governor of British Columbia – Walter Cameron Nichol
- Lieutenant Governor of Manitoba – James Albert Manning Aikins
- Lieutenant Governor of New Brunswick – William Pugsley
- Lieutenant Governor of Nova Scotia – MacCallum Grant
- Lieutenant Governor of Ontario – Henry Cockshutt
- Lieutenant Governor of Prince Edward Island – Murdock MacKinnon
- Lieutenant Governor of Quebec – Charles Fitzpatrick
- Lieutenant Governor of Saskatchewan – Henry William Newlands

==== Premiers ====
- Premier of Alberta – Herbert Greenfield
- Premier of British Columbia – John Oliver
- Premier of Manitoba – Tobias Norris (until August 8) then John Bracken
- Premier of New Brunswick – Walter Foster
- Premier of Nova Scotia – George Henry Murray
- Premier of Ontario – Ernest Drury
- Premier of Prince Edward Island – John Howatt Bell
- Premier of Quebec – Louis-Alexandre Taschereau
- Premier of Saskatchewan – William Melville Martin (until April 5) then Charles Avery Dunning

=== Territorial governments ===
==== Commissioners ====
- Gold Commissioner of Yukon – George P. MacKenzie
- Commissioner of Northwest Territories – William Wallace Cory

== Events ==
- January 1 – British Columbia changes from driving on the left to the right
- January 11 – The world's first insulin treatment is made at the Toronto General Hospital. The successful technique would later win a Nobel Prize for its creators, Frederick Banting and Charles Best.
- April 5 – Charles Dunning becomes premier of Saskatchewan, replacing William Martin
- May 3 – The women of Prince Edward Island win the right to vote
- July – Rodeo's first hornless bronc saddle is designed and made by rodeo cowboy and saddle maker Earl Bascom at the Bascom Ranch, Lethbridge, Alberta
- August 8 – John Bracken becomes premier of Manitoba, replacing Tobias Norris
- September 15 – Prime Minister Mackenzie King refuses to support the British in the Chanak Affair, asserting foreign policy independence for the first time
- October 9 – Prairie Bible College opens with eight students in Three Hills, Alberta
- October 22 – Dante Monument unveiled in Montreal
- December 1 – New Brunswick changes from driving on the left to the right
- December 5 – The land around Vimy Ridge is given to Canada by France in gratitude for the Canadian sacrifices during World War I

=== Full date unknown ===
- Montreal Clock Tower completed
- The first licences for private commercial radio stations are issued

== Sport ==
- March 20–22 – The Ontario Hockey Association's Fort William War Veterans win their only Memorial Cup by defeating the South Saskatchewan Junior Hockey League's Regina Pats 8 to 7 in a two-game aggregate played at Shea's Amphitheatre in Winnipeg
- March 28 – The NHL's Toronto St. Pats win their first Stanley Cup by defeating the Pacific Coast Hockey Association's Vancouver Millionaires 3 games to 2. The deciding game was played at Toronto's Arena Gardens
- December 2 – Queen's University win their first Grey Cup by defeating the Edmonton Elks 13 to 1 in the 10th Grey Cup played at Kingston's Richardson Memorial Stadium

== Arts and literature ==
- Nanook of the North is released, the first film to be called a documentary

== Births ==
=== January to June ===
- January 21
  - Lincoln Alexander, politician and 24th Lieutenant Governor of Ontario (d. 2012)
  - Rhoda Wurtele and Rhona Wurtele (d. 2020), skiers
- February 13 – Fred E. Soucy, politician (d. 1993)
- February 18 – J. Keith Fraser, physical geographer
- February 25
  - Molly Bobak, teacher, writer, printmaker and painter (d. 2015)
  - Molly Reilly, aviator (d. 1980)
- April 3 – Maurice Riel, senator (d. 2007)
- April 7 – Nancy Mackay, athlete (d. 2016)
- April 24 – Philip Givens, politician, judge and Mayor of Toronto (d. 1995)
- April 26 – Jeanne Sauvé, politician and first female Governor General of Canada (d. 1993)
- April 28 – Daryl Seaman, businessman (d. 2009)
- May 2 – Alastair Gillespie, businessman and politician (d. 2018)
- May 2 – A. M. Rosenthal, columnist and newspaper editor (d. 2006)
- May 3 – Jeanne Landry, composer, pianist and teacher (d. 2011)
- May 26 – Lorraine Monk, photographer (d. 2020)
- June 9 – Fernand Seguin, biochemist, professor and television host (d. 1988)
- June 11 – Erving Goffman, sociologist and writer (d. 1982)
- June 22 – Richard Vollenweider, limnologist (d. 2007)

=== July to September ===
- July 1 – Derek Riley, rower (d. 2018)
- July 5 – Doris Margaret Anderson, nutritionist and politician (d. 2022)
- July 13 – Ken Mosdell, ice hockey player (d. 2006)
- July 14
  - Bill Millin, piper (d. 2010)
  - Gerald Myrden, businessman (d. 2016)
- July 16 – Augustin Brassard, politician (d. 1971)
- July 18 – Harry Kermode, basketball player (d. 2009)
- July 23 – Jenny Pike, WWII servicewoman and photographer (d. 2004)
- July 30 – Jack McClelland, publisher (d. 2004)
- August 7 – Helmut Kallmann, historian (d. 2012)
- August 11 – Mavis Gallant, writer (d. 2014)
- August 24 – René Lévesque, politician, Minister and 23rd Premier of Quebec (d. 1987)
- September 1 – Yvonne De Carlo, actress, dancer and singer (d. 2007)
- September 3 – Salli Terri, singer, arranger, recording artist and songwriter (d. 1996)
- September 16 – Alex Barris, actor and writer (d. 2004)

=== October to December ===
- October 9 – Léon Dion, political scientist (d. 1997)
- October 17 – Pierre Juneau, politician and film and broadcast executive (d. 2012)
- November 12 – Charlotte MacLeod, writer (d. 2005)
- December 3 – Muriel Millard, actress, dancer, painter, singer-songwriter (d. 2014)
- December 11 – Pauline Jewett, politician and educator (d. 1992)
- December 22 – Percy Smith, barrister, lawyer and politician (d. 2009)
- December 25 – Steve Wochy, ice hockey player

=== Full date unknown ===
- Milt Harradence, lawyer, pilot, politician and judge (d. 2008)
- Hilda Watson, leader of the Yukon Progressive Conservative Party (d. 1997)

== Deaths ==
- January 26 – Robert Beith, politician (b. 1843)
- February 4 – Joe Fortes, lifeguard (b. 1863)
- April 12 – Robert Boston, politician (b. 1836)
- May 23 – Robert Franklin Sutherland, politician and Speaker of the House of Commons of Canada (b. 1859)
- July 22 – Sara Jeannette Duncan, author and journalist (b. 1861)
- August 2 – Alexander Graham Bell, scientist, inventor, engineer and innovator who is credited with inventing the first practical telephone (b. 1847)
- December 3 – William Proudfoot, politician and barrister (b. 1859)

== See also ==
- List of Canadian films
