= 1846 in Canada =

- Decades: 1820s; 1830s; 1840s; 1850s; 1860s
- See also: History of Canada; Timeline of Canadian history; List of years in Canada

Events from the year 1846 in Canada.

== Incumbents ==
- Monarch: Victoria

=== Federal government ===
- Parliament: 2nd

=== Governors ===
- Governor General of the Province of Canada: Charles Cathcart, 2nd Earl Cathcart
- Governor of New Brunswick: William MacBean George Colebrooke
- Governor of Nova Scotia: Lucius Cary, 10th Viscount Falkland
- Civil Governor of Newfoundland: John Harvey
- Governor of Prince Edward Island: Henry Vere Huntley

=== Premiers ===
- Joint Premiers of the Province of Canada —
  - William Henry Draper, Canada West Premier
  - Denis-Benjamin Viger, Canada East Premier

== Events ==
- January 29 – Many persons in the Eastern Townships are arrested on charge of counterfeiting, being afterwards tried before Sir James Stuart and other Judges. Hon L. T. Drummond and Edward Short, (afterwards judges), prosecute; H. B. Terrill (afterwards M.P.P. for Stanstead), defends. All are acquitted.
- April 18 – The commission on Rebellion Losses reports.
- 16 May – Under the leadership of British Prime Minister Robert Peel, the British Parliament repeals the Corn Laws, replacing the old Colonial mercantile trade system with Free Trade.
- June 9 – Burning of St. John's, Newfoundland.
- June 12 – Theatre burned at Quebec.
- June 15 – Britain and United States settle the long-disputed boundary across the Columbia District or Oregon Country from the Rocky Mountains to the Pacific, by drawing the boundary across the mountains along the 49th Parallel to the Strait of Georgia, and leaving the Colony of Vancouver Island, established in 1843, intact.

=== Full date unknown ===
- Mines north of Lake Superior are explored.
- The new canal, from Lachine, overcomes a fall of 42 ft., in 8½ miles, by two locks of 13 ft. and two of 8 ft. Equal fall of the whole river would wield 4,500,000 horse power.
- Hon. John Young writes the Economist, favoring a bridge across the St. Lawrence.
- The Great Famine begins, marking a change in the composition of Irish immigrating to Canada from mostly rich, well-connected, respectable Protestants to vastly poor, ill-equipped, poorly treated Catholics.
- David Thompson begins compiling a book about his travels.
- The first copper mine in Canada opens at Bruce Mines.

== Births ==
- January 14 – Daniel Hunter McMillan, politician and Lieutenant-Governor of Manitoba (died 1933)
- May 1 – Pierre-Amand Landry, lawyer, judge and politician (died 1916)
- July 31 – Thomas George Roddick, surgeon, medical administrator and politician (died 1923)
- August 12 – Graham Fraser (industrialist) (died 1915)
- October 26 – Gilbert Anselme Girouard, politician (died 1885)
- December 8 – Antoine Audet, politician (died 1915)
- December 13 – John Howatt Bell, lawyer, politician and Premier of Prince Edward Island (died 1929)

== Deaths ==
- September 5 – Charles Metcalfe, 1st Baron Metcalfe, colonial administrator (born 1785)
- November 23 – James Evans, missionary and linguist (born 1801)
