= 1844 in Canada =

- Decades: 1820s; 1830s; 1840s; 1850s; 1860s
- See also: History of Canada; Timeline of Canadian history; List of years in Canada

Events from the year 1844 in Canada.

== Incumbents ==
- Monarch: Victoria

=== Federal government ===
- Parliament: 2nd (starting November 28)

=== Governors ===
- Governor General of the Province of Canada: Charles Metcalfe, 1st Baron Metcalfe
- Governor of New Brunswick: William MacBean George Colebrooke
- Governor of Nova Scotia: Lucius Cary, 10th Viscount Falkland
- Civil Governor of Newfoundland: John Harvey
- Governor of Prince Edward Island: Henry Vere Huntley

=== Premiers ===
- Joint Premiers of the Province of Canada —
  - William Henry Draper, Canada West Premier
  - Denis-Benjamin Viger, Canada East Premier

== Events ==
- March 5 – The Toronto Globe is founded by George Brown
- May 10 – Government moves from Kingston to Montreal.
- Amnesty in Montreal provides for Papineau's return.

== Births ==
- January 19 – William Mulock, politician and Minister (died 1944)
- February 20 – Joshua Slocum, seaman, adventurer, writer, and first man to sail single-handedly around the world (died 1909)
- March 7 – Andrew George Blair, politician and 6th Premier of New Brunswick (died 1907)
- May 8 – Théotime Blanchard, farmer, merchant and politician (died 1911)
- October 22 – Louis Riel, politician and Métis leader (died 1885)

== Deaths ==
- January 8 – William Warren Baldwin, doctor, militia officer, jp, lawyer, office holder, judge, businessman, and politician (born 1775)
- February 6 – William Abrams, businessman, jp, judge, office holder, and militia officer (born 1785)
