= 1835 in Canada =

- Decades: 1810s; 1820s; 1830s; 1840s; 1850s
- See also: History of Canada; Timeline of Canadian history; List of years in Canada

Events from the year 1835 in Canada.

== Incumbents ==
- Monarch: William IV

=== Federal government ===
- Parliament of Lower Canada: 15th (starting March 21)
- Parliament of Upper Canada: 12th (starting January 15)

=== Governors ===
- Governor of the Canadas: Lord of Alymer then Earl of Gosford
- Governor of New Brunswick: Sir Archibald Campbell
- Governor of Nova Scotia: Colin Campbell
- Commodore-Governor of Newfoundland: Henry Prescott
- Governor of Prince Edward Island: Aretas William Young then George Wright
- Governor of Upper Canada: John Colborne

== Events ==
- February 21 – The Governor's speech, proroguing the Assembly's last session, is expunged from the Journals. The revolutionary speech reduces the Country Party in the House to less than two-thirds of the members. The Governor will not sign a warrant for sessional expenses, until past payments are ratified. He prorogues the House.
- June 1 – Official opening of the Kingston Penitentiary.

=== Full date unknown ===
- Joseph Howe, a Halifax printer and owner since 1828 of the weekly Novascotian, is arrested for libel but successfully argues his own case for freedom of the press. A local hero, he begins advocating the kind of responsible government that is only established in 1848.
- In the British Parliament, Mr. Stanley says there is no evidence to justify any one of the 92 Resolutions.
- Sir Robert Peel announces that a Commission will investigate Canadian affairs, and report; but that no change of Constitution will be immediately made. If complaints as to its working prove unfounded, the agitation will be suppressed. To those threatening insurrection, he says "Our desire is to do justice; beware, then, lest your threats turn to your own disadvantage.

== Births ==
- January 2 – Benjamin Jackson, sailor, American Civil War veteran (died 1915)
- March 22 – Pierre Bachand, politician (died 1878)
- June – Richard Alleyn, lawyer, judge, educator and politician (died 1883)
- June 27 – Daniel Lionel Hanington, politician and 5th Premier of New Brunswick (died 1909)
- June 28 – Adélard Joseph Boucher, politician (died 1912)
- September 20 – Alfred Boyd, politician and 1st Premier of Manitoba (died 1908)
- November 5 – Edgar Dewdney, politician, Lieutenant Governor of Northwest Territories and Lieutenant Governor of British Columbia (died 1916)
- December 4 – Richard John Cartwright, businessman, politician and Minister (died 1912)
