= 1921 in Canada =

- Decades: 1900s; 1910s; 1920s; 1930s; 1940s
- See also: History of Canada; Timeline of Canadian history; List of years in Canada

Events from the year 1921 in Canada.

== Incumbents ==
=== Crown ===
- Monarch – George V

=== Federal government ===
- Governor General – Victor Cavendish, 9th Duke of Devonshire (until August 11) then Julian Byng
- Prime Minister – Arthur Meighen (until December 29) then William Lyon Mackenzie King
- Chief Justice – Louis Henry Davies (Prince Edward Island)
- Parliament – 13th (until 4 October)

=== Provincial governments ===
==== Lieutenant governors ====
- Lieutenant Governor of Alberta – Robert Brett
- Lieutenant Governor of British Columbia – Walter Cameron Nichol
- Lieutenant Governor of Manitoba – James Albert Manning Aikins
- Lieutenant Governor of New Brunswick – William Pugsley
- Lieutenant Governor of Nova Scotia – MacCallum Grant
- Lieutenant Governor of Ontario – Lionel Herbert Clarke (until August 29) then Henry Cockshutt (from September 10)
- Lieutenant Governor of Prince Edward Island – Murdock MacKinnon
- Lieutenant Governor of Quebec – Charles Fitzpatrick
- Lieutenant Governor of Saskatchewan – Richard Stuart Lake (until February 17) then Henry William Newlands

==== Premiers ====
- Premier of Alberta – Charles Stewart (until August 13) then Herbert Greenfield
- Premier of British Columbia – John Oliver
- Premier of Manitoba – Tobias Norris
- Premier of New Brunswick – Walter Foster
- Premier of Nova Scotia – George Henry Murray
- Premier of Ontario – Ernest Drury
- Premier of Prince Edward Island – John Howatt Bell
- Premier of Quebec – Louis-Alexandre Taschereau
- Premier of Saskatchewan – William Melville Martin

=== Territorial governments ===
==== Commissioners ====
- Gold Commissioner of Yukon – George P. MacKenzie
- Commissioner of Northwest Territories – William Wallace Cory

== Events ==
- March 26 – The Bluenose is launched
- May 28 and 29 – Founding of the Communist Party of Canada at a clandestine meeting held in a barn in Guelph, Ontario
- June 9 – 1921 Saskatchewan general election: William M. Martin's Liberals win a fifth consecutive majority
- June 15 – Prohibition comes to an end in British Columbia
- July 18 – 1921 Alberta general election: The United Farmers of Alberta (UFA) win a majority, defeating Premier Charles Stewart's Liberals. Henry Wise Wood, who had remained president of the UFA despite opposing its branching into electoral politics, declines the premiership. The UFA caucus hastily selects Herbert Greenfield to become premier.
- hottest July on record (to date) across Eastern Canada
- July 27 – Frederick Banting and Charles Best discover insulin
- August 13 – Herbert Greenfield becomes premier of Alberta, replacing Charles Stewart
- November 21 – Canada is granted its armorial bearings by Royal Proclamation. Canada's official colours declared to be red and white
- December 6 – Federal election: William Lyon Mackenzie King's Liberals win a minority, defeating Arthur Meighen's Conservatives. Agnes Macphail becomes the first woman elected to Parliament, representing the rural Ontario riding of Grey South East. That election was the first in which all Canadian women (at least 21 years of age) had the right to vote and to stand as candidates. Macphail was re-elected to the House of Commons four times and served for more than eighteen years. Later, she would be one of the first two women elected to the Ontario legislature.
- December 29 – Mackenzie King becomes prime minister, replacing Arthur Meighen.

=== Full date unknown ===
- The school board in Victoria, British Columbia, creates a segregated school for the Chinese population. After a boycott of the new school, the plan is scrapped.
- A study of Saskatchewan school students discovers that 56% of them are infected with tuberculosis
- Mary Ellen Smith in British Columbia becomes the first woman cabinet minister in Canada.
- The Cenotaph, Montreal, is unveiled
- The War Memorial of Montreal West is unveiled

== Arts and literature ==
- February 15 – The Capitol Theatre opened in Winnipeg.
- March 12 – The Capitol Theatre, a lush 2,500 seat movie palace, opened on Vancouver's Granville Street.

== Sports ==
- March 24–26 – The Manitoba Junior Hockey League's Winnipeg Falcons win their only Memorial Cup by defeating the Ontario Hockey Association's Stratford Midgets 11 to 9 in a 2-game aggregate played at Arena Gardens in Toronto
- April 4 – The Ottawa Senators beat the Vancouver Millionaires 2–1 to win the Stanley Cup
- December 3 – In the first East-West Grey Cup the Toronto Argonauts win their second Grey Cup championship by defeating the Edmonton Eskimos 23 to 0 in the 9th Grey Cup played at Toronto's Varsity Stadium

== Births ==
=== January to March ===
- January 6 – Hazen Argue, politician (d. 1991)
- January 9 – Lister Sinclair, broadcaster, playwright and polymath (d. 2006)
- January 20 – Jacques Ferron, physician and author, founder of the Parti Rhinocéros (d. 1985)
- February 8 – Barney Danson, politician and soldier (d. 2011)
- February 11 – Johnny Fripp, skier and football player (d. 2022)
- February 14 – Hazel McCallion, politician and 5th Mayor of Mississauga (d. 2023)
- February 17 – Muriel Coben, baseball and curling player (d. 1979)
- February 21 – George Manuel, Aboriginal leader (d. 1989)
- February 25 – Pierre Laporte, Quebec politician and Minister, kidnapped and murdered by Front de libération du Québec (FLQ) (d. 1970)
- March 10 – Cec Linder, actor (d. 1992)
- March 27 – Calvin Gotlieb, professor and computer scientist (d. 2016)

=== April to June ===
- April 1 – Ken Reardon, ice hockey player (d. 2008)
- April 4 – Charles Dubin, lawyer and former Chief Justice of Ontario (d. 2008)
- April 30 – Don Jamieson, politician, diplomat and broadcaster (d. 1986)
- May 5 – Jim Conacher, ice hockey player (d. 2020)
- May 12 – Farley Mowat, conservationist and author (d. 2014)
- May 31 – Peter Fox, politician (d. 1989)
- June 8 – Alexis Smith, actress (d. 1993)
- June 25
  - Yves Forest, politician (d. 2019)
  - Celia Franca, ballet dancer and founder and artistic director of the National Ballet of Canada (d. 2007)

=== July to December ===
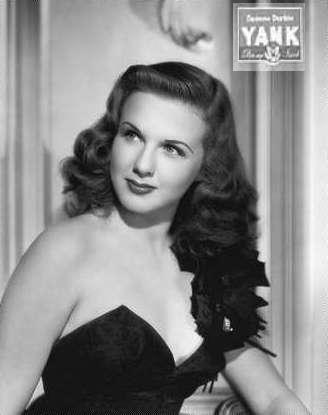
Deanna Durbin on the cover of Yank Magazine, January 1945

- July 1 – Arthur Johnson, sprint canoeist (d. 2003)
- July 6 – Allan MacEachen, politician, Minister and senator, first Deputy Prime Minister of Canada (d. 2017)
- August 4 – Maurice Richard, ice hockey player (d. 2000)
- August 8 – John Herbert Chapman, scientist and space researcher (d. 1979)
- August 11 – Allan Waters, businessman and media mogul (d. 2005)
- August 25 – Monty Hall, game show host, producer, actor, singer and sportscaster (d. 2017)
- September 5 – Murray Henderson, hockey player (Boston Bruins) (d. 2013)
- September 14 – A. Jean de Grandpré, lawyer and businessman (d. 2022)
- September 15 – Norma MacMillan, voice actress (d. 2001)
- September 16 – Ursula Franklin, metallurgist, research physicist, author and educator (d. 2016)
- September 29 – James Cross, British diplomat kidnapped by the Front de libération du Québec (FLQ) (d. 2021)
- November 25 – Fraser Elliott, lawyer, supporter of the arts and philanthropist (d. 2005)
- December 4 – Deanna Durbin, singer and actress (d. 2013)
- December 6 – George Beurling, most successful Canadian fighter pilot of World War II (d. 1948)
- December 7 – Eric Blackwood, aviator (d. 2007)
- December 10
  - James Foort, inventor and artist (d. 2020)
  - Howard Fredeen, scientist and animal breeding researcher (d. 2021)

=== Full date unknown ===
- Fred Davis, broadcaster and moderator of Front Page Challenge (d. 1996)

== Deaths ==
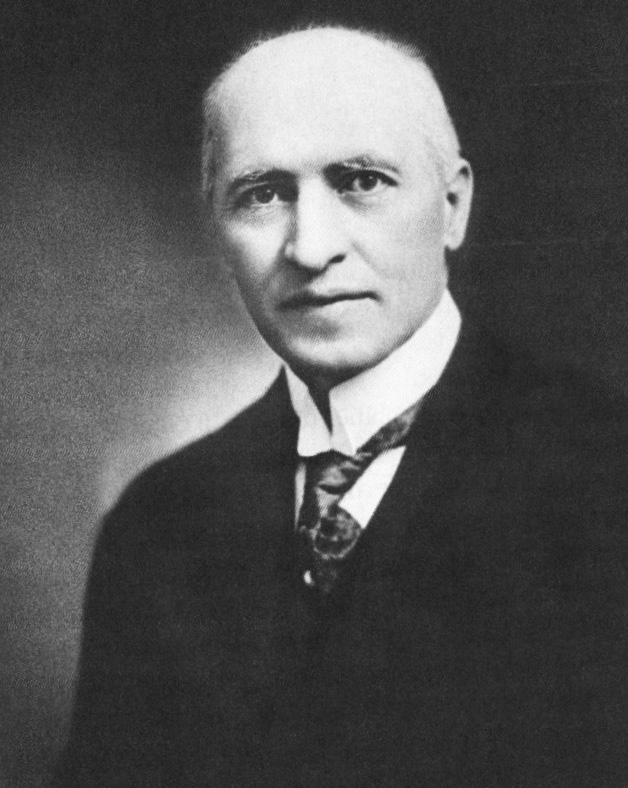
Arthur Sifton

- January 21 – Arthur Sifton, politician and 2nd Premier of Alberta (b. 1858)
- August 29 – Lionel Herbert Clarke, businessman and Lieutenant Governor of Ontario (b. 1859)
- October 19 – George Washington Kendall (b. 1881)
- November 1 – Zoé Lafontaine, wife of Sir Wilfrid Laurier, 7th Prime Minister of Canada (b. 1842)
- November 10 – Jennie Kidd Trout, physician, first woman in Canada legally to become a medical doctor and only woman in Canada licensed to practice medicine until 1880 (b. 1841)
- November 27 – Douglas Colin Cameron, politician and Lieutenant-Governor of Manitoba (b. 1854)

== See also ==
- List of Canadian films
