= 1843 in Canada =

- Decades: 1820s; 1830s; 1840s; 1850s; 1860s
- See also: History of Canada; Timeline of Canadian history; List of years in Canada

Events from the year 1843 in Canada.

== Incumbents ==
- Monarch: Victoria

=== Federal government ===
- Parliament: 1st

=== Governors ===
- Governor General of the Province of Canada: Charles Bagot (until 19 May); Charles Metcalfe, 1st Baron Metcalfe (starting 30 May)
- Governor of New Brunswick: William MacBean George Colebrooke
- Governor of Nova Scotia: Lucius Cary, 10th Viscount Falkland
- Civil Governor of Newfoundland: John Harvey
- Governor of Prince Edward Island: Henry Vere Huntley

=== Premiers ===
- Joint Premiers of the Province of Canada —
  - Robert Baldwin, Canada West Premier
  - Sir Louis-Hippolyte Lafontaine Canada East Premier

== Events ==
- January 19 – Mount Allison University is founded.
- September 1 – First Prime Minister of Canada Sir John A. Macdonald marries Isabella Clark
- December 9 – Bishop's University is founded.

=== Full date unknown ===
- Fort Victoria built by British to strengthen their claim to Vancouver Island.
- David Thompson sends a set of refined maps to London.
- Lord Metcalfe comes to Montreal.
- The Cornwall and Chambly Canals are opened.
- Survey of Boundary, between the U.S. and Canada, is begun.
- Grace Marks is controversially convicted of murder after her trial on November 3 and 4, 1843. The crime and trial will form the basis for Margaret Atwood's novel Alias Grace in 1996.

== Births ==
=== January to June ===
- February 3 – William Cornelius Van Horne, pioneering railway executive (died 1915)
- February 10 – Jean Blanchet, politician (died 1908)
- March 16 – James Mitchell, politician and 7th Premier of New Brunswick (died 1897)
- May 2 – Elijah McCoy, inventor and engineer (died 1929)
- May 17 – Robert Beith, politician (died 1922)
- June 1 – David Howard Harrison, farmer, physician, politician and 6th Premier of Manitoba (died 1905)

=== July to December ===
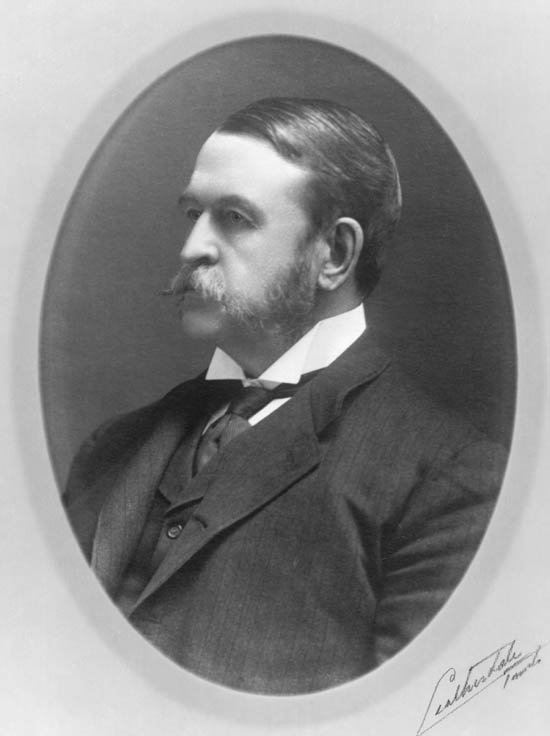
James Whitney

- August 4 – Joseph-Guillaume Bossé, politician and lawyer (died 1908)
- September 30 – Samuel Barton Burdett, politician, lawyer and lecturer (died 1892)
- October 2 – James Whitney, politician and 6th Premier of Ontario (died 1914)
- October 25 – Thomas Simpson Sproule, politician and Speaker of the House of Commons of Canada (died 1917)
- December 3 – William Dillon Otter, soldier and first Canadian-born Chief of the General Staff (died 1929)
- December 6 – William Wilfred Sullivan, journalist, jurist, politician and Premier of Prince Edward Island (died 1920)

== Deaths ==
- February 26 (baptised) – William Carson (born 1770)
- September 16 – Ezekiel Hart, entrepreneur, politician, and first Jew to be elected to public office in the British Empire (born 1767)
- October 6 – Sir Archibald Campbell, 1st Baronet, army officer and colonial administrator (born 1769)
