= 1842 in Canada =

- Decades: 1820s; 1830s; 1840s; 1850s; 1860s
- See also: History of Canada; Timeline of Canadian history; List of years in Canada

Events from the year 1842 in Canada.

== Incumbents ==
- Monarch: Victoria

=== Federal government ===
- Parliament: 1st

=== Governors ===
- Governor General of the Province of Canada: Charles Bagot (starting 12 January)
- Governor of New Brunswick: William MacBean George Colebrooke
- Governor of Nova Scotia: Lucius Cary, 10th Viscount Falkland
- Civil Governor of Newfoundland: John Harvey
- Governor of Prince Edward Island: Henry Vere Huntley
- Governor of Canada West: Richard Downes Jackson

=== Premiers ===
- Joint Premiers of the Province of Canada —
  - William Henry Draper, Canada West Premier
  - Charles Richard Ogden, Canada East Premier

== Events ==
- January 10 – Governor General of Canada Sir Charles Bagot arrives at Kingston, Ontario.
- January 12 – The Islander is founded Charlottetown, Prince Edward Island
- August 9 – The Webster–Ashburton Treaty ends the Aroostook War, settling once and for all the Maine–New Brunswick border dispute.
- October 16 – Queen's University is founded
- The first Railway in Nova Scotia is begun.

=== Full date unknown ===
- 1842 Newfoundland general election
- Cornish emigrants begin to arrive in the area of Bruce Mines

== Births ==
- January 1 – John Morison Gibson, politician and Lieutenant Governor of Ontario (died 1929)
- March 4 – Hector Berthelot, lawyer, journalist and publisher (died 1895)
- June 26 – Zoé Lafontaine, wife of Sir Wilfrid Laurier, 7th Prime Minister of Canada (died 1921)
- June 30 – William Smithe, politician and 6th Premier of British Columbia (died 1887)
- July 11 – Louis-Philippe Turcotte, historian (died 1878)
- August 14 – Malcolm Alexander MacLean, 1st Mayor of Vancouver (died 1895)
- August 15 – Judson Burpee Black, physician and politician (died 1924)
- September 9 – Silas Tertius Rand Bill, politician, merchant and shipowner (died 1890)
- December 15 – Neil McLeod, lawyer, judge, politician and Premier of Prince Edward Island (died 1915)
- December 28 – Calixa Lavallée, musician and composer (died 1891)

=== Full date unknown ===
- Poundmaker, Cree chief (died 1886)
- Jean Baptiste Blanchet, politician (died 1904)
- Arthur Boyle, politician (died 1919)
- Thomas Scott, Orangemen (died 1870)
