= 1848 in Canada =

- Decades: 1820s; 1830s; 1840s; 1850s; 1860s
- See also: History of Canada; Timeline of Canadian history; List of years in Canada

Events from the year 1848 in Canada.

== Incumbents ==
- Monarch — Victoria

=== Federal government ===
- Parliament: 3rd

=== Governors ===
- Governor General of the Province of Canada — James Bruce, 8th Earl of Elgin
- Governor of New Brunswick: William MacBean George Colebrooke
- Governor of Nova Scotia: Lucius Cary, 10th Viscount Falkland
- Civil Governor of Newfoundland: John Harvey
- Governor of Prince Edward Island: Henry Vere Huntley

=== Premiers ===
- Joint Premiers of the Province of Canada —
  - Henry Sherwood, Canada West Premier
  - Canada East Premiership vacant from December 8, 1847
- Premier of Nova Scotia — James Boyle Uniacke

== Events ==
- January 2 – Maple sugar is made in St. Anselme.
- January 15 – Wellington and Commissioners streets in Montreal are flooded.
- January 27 – Ploughing about Bathurst and Beckwith.
- March 4 – The so-called Great Ministry of Robert Baldwin and Louis-Hippolyte Lafontaine begins.
- May 15 – MP's vote themselves 50 pounds each for 25 days.
- July 5 – Run on the Savings Bank, Montreal, followed by re-deposit.
- September 20 – Opening of the Jesuits' College, Montreal.

=== full date unknown ===
- First telegraph lines in Nova Scotia and New Brunswick.
- 1848 Newfoundland general election
- Responsible government established in Nova Scotia and The Canadas.

== Births ==
- January 19 – John Fitzwilliam Stairs, entrepreneur and statesman (died 1904)
- February 4 – James Brien, politician and physician (died 1907)
- February 24 – Grant Allen, science writer, author and novelist (died 1899)
- March 7 – Isidore-Noël Belleau, politician and lawyer (died 1936)
- March 24 – Honoré Beaugrand, journalist, politician, author and folklorist (died 1906)
- April 14 – James Walker, jurist
- April 23 – George Clift King, politician and 2 Mayor of Calgary (died 1935)
- May 20 – Joseph-Aldric Ouimet, politician (died 1916)
- July 18 – Hugh Graham, 1st Baron Atholstan, newspaper publisher (died 1938)
- October 23 – Joseph Tassé, politician (died 1895)
- November 24 – William Stevens Fielding, journalist, politician and Premier of Nova Scotia (died 1929)
- December 21 – George Boyce, politician (died 1930)

== Deaths ==
- February 1 – John Neilson, publisher, printer, bookseller, politician, farmer, and militia officer (born 1776)
