= 1917 in Canada =

- Decades: 1890s; 1900s; 1910s; 1920s; 1930s
- See also: History of Canada; Timeline of Canadian history; List of years in Canada

Events from the year 1917 in Canada.

== Incumbents ==
=== Crown ===
- Monarch – George V

=== Federal government ===
- Governor General – Victor Cavendish, 9th Duke of Devonshire
- Prime Minister – Robert Borden
- Chief Justice – Charles Fitzpatrick (Quebec)
- Parliament – 12th (until 6 October)

=== Provincial governments ===
==== Lieutenant governors ====
- Lieutenant Governor of Alberta – Robert Brett
- Lieutenant Governor of British Columbia – Francis Stillman Barnard
- Lieutenant Governor of Manitoba – James Albert Manning Aikins
- Lieutenant Governor of New Brunswick – Josiah Wood (until June 29) then Gilbert Ganong (June 29 to October 31) then William Pugsley (from November 6)
- Lieutenant Governor of Nova Scotia – MacCallum Grant
- Lieutenant Governor of Ontario – John Strathearn Hendrie
- Lieutenant Governor of Prince Edward Island – Augustine Colin Macdonald
- Lieutenant Governor of Quebec – Pierre-Évariste Leblanc
- Lieutenant Governor of Saskatchewan – Richard Stuart Lake

==== Premiers ====
- Premier of Alberta – Arthur Sifton (until October 30) then Charles Stewart
- Premier of British Columbia – Harlan Brewster
- Premier of Manitoba – Tobias Norris
- Premier of New Brunswick – George Johnson Clarke (until February 1) then James A. Murray (February 1 to April 4) then Walter Foster
- Premier of Nova Scotia – George Henry Murray
- Premier of Ontario – William Hearst
- Premier of Prince Edward Island – John Mathieson (until June 21) then Aubin Arsenault
- Premier of Quebec – Lomer Gouin
- Premier of Saskatchewan – William Melville Martin

=== Territorial governments ===
==== Commissioners ====
- Commissioner of Yukon – George Norris Williams (acting)
- Gold Commissioner of Yukon – George P. MacKenzie
- Commissioner of Northwest Territories – Frederick D. White

== Elections ==
Provincial

- June 7 – Alberta election: Arthur Sifton's Liberals win a fourth consecutive majority. Louise McKinney and Roberta MacAdams are elected to the Legislative Assembly of Alberta, the first two women elected to a legislature in the British Empire.
- June 26 – Saskatchewan election: William Martin's Liberals win a fourth consecutive majority.

Federal

- December 17: Robert Borden's Conservatives win a second consecutive majority in the Federal election

== Events ==
=== January to June ===
- February 1 – James Alexander Murray becomes premier of New Brunswick, replacing George Johnson Clarke
- April 4 – Walter Foster becomes premier of New Brunswick, replacing Murray
- April 9 – April 14 – Battle of Vimy Ridge.
- April 17 – Leon Trotsky, en route from New York to Russia, is detained in Halifax. He will spend the next month in Amherst Internment Camp before being released.
- June 21 – Aubin Arsenault becomes premier of Prince Edward Island, replacing John Mathieson

=== July to December ===
- July 1: Canada celebrates its 50th Dominion Day.
- July 6: The Conscription Crisis of 1917 leads to the passage of the Military Service Act.
- July 25: Sir William Thomas White introduces Canada's first income tax as a "temporary" measure (lowest bracket is 4% and highest is 25%).
- September 20: The Income War Tax Act receives royal assent. The "temporary" tax remains in force to this day.
- September 20: The Wartime Elections Act gives female relatives of servicemen the vote.
- October 26 – November 10: Second Battle of Passchendaele.
- October 30: Charles Stewart (1868–1946) becomes premier of Alberta, replacing Arthur Sifton
- November 1 to 30: Swanson Bay, British Columbia, records 88 inches (2,235 mm) of precipitation for the month, which remains the highest officially recorded for one calendar month in North America.
- December 6: Halifax Explosion kills 1,900 people and injures 9,000. The largest ever man-made explosion pre-Hiroshima atomic bomb.

== Arts and literature ==
- Tom Thomson paints The Jack Pine, one of Canada's most widely recognized and reproduced artworks.

== Sport ==
- March 26 – The Pacific Coast Hockey Association's Seattle Metropolitans become the first American team to win the Stanley Cup by defeating the National Hockey Association's Montreal Canadiens 3 games to 1. The Metropolitans won their only Cup in front of their home crowd at Seattle Ice Arena
- November 26 – The National Hockey League (NHL) is established in Montreal, with 4 teams from the National Hockey Association (Montreal Canadiens, Montreal Wanderers, Ottawa Senators, and Quebec Bulldogs) The owners would form a new team in Toronto due to a dispute Toronto Blueshirts owner Eddie Livingstone, the Toronto Hockey Club (Toronto Maple Leafs)
- December 19 – Montreal Wanderers defeat the Toronto Arenas in the first NHL game.

== Births ==
=== January to June ===
- January 6 – Sydney Banks, broadcaster and producer (d.2006)
- January 11 – John Robarts, lawyer, politician and 17th Premier of Ontario (d.1982)
- January 12 – Jimmy Skinner, ice hockey coach (d.2007)
- April 11 – Danny Gallivan, radio and television broadcaster and sportscaster (d. 1993)
- April 25 – George R. Gardiner, businessman, philanthropist and co-founder of the Gardiner Museum (d.1997)
- May 12 – Frank Clair, Canadian Football League coach (d.2005)
- May 19 – Robert Gordon Robertson, civil servant and 7th Commissioner of the Northwest Territories (d.2013)
- May 21 – Raymond Burr, actor (d.1993)
- May 22 – Lude Check, ice hockey player (d.2009)
- May 24 – Ross Thatcher, politician and 9th Premier of Saskatchewan (d.1971)
- June 17 – Dufferin Roblin, businessman, politician and 14th Premier of Manitoba (d.2010)
- June 18 – Arthur Tremblay, politician and Senator (d.1996)
- June 29 – Archie Green, folklorist and musicologist (d.2009)

=== July to December ===
- July 17 – John Hayes, harness racing driver, trainer and owner (d. 1998)
- July 21 – Alan B. Gold, chief justice of the Quebec Superior Court (d. 2005)
- September 12 – Pierre Sévigny, soldier, author, politician and academic (d. 2004)
- September 15 – Alf Pike, ice hockey player and coach (d. 2009)
- September 26 – Réal Caouette, politician (d. 1976)
- November 2 – Ann Rutherford, actress (Gone with the Wind, The Secret Life of Walter Mitty). (d. 2012)
- November 11 – Abram Hoffer, orthomolecular psychiatrist (d. 2009)
- November 28 – Jacob Froese, politician (d. 2003)
- December 6 – Irv Robbins, Canadian-American entrepreneur (d. 2008)

=== Full date unknown ===
- Kent Rowley, labour activist and union organizer (d. 2013)
- Jack Singer, businessman and philanthropist (d. 2013)

== Deaths ==
=== January to June ===
- January 8 – Ward Bowlby, lawyer and politician, reeve of Berlin, Ontario (born 1834)
- January 14 – Alexander Cameron, physician and politician (b.1834)
- February 17 – Ralph Smith, coal miner, labour leader and politician (b.1858)
- February 26 – George Johnson Clarke, lawyer, journalist, politician and 14th Premier of New Brunswick (b.1857)
- April 21 – George Thomas Baird, politician, Senator for Victoria, New Brunswick (b. 1847)
- June 13 – Louis-Philippe Hébert, sculptor (b.1850)

=== July to December ===
- July 5 – Percival Molson, athlete and soldier (b.1880)
- July 8 – Tom Thomson, artist (b.1877)
- July 15 – Lemuel John Tweedie, politician and 9th premier of New Brunswick (b.1849)
- August 6 – Richard McBride, politician and Premier of British Columbia (b.1870)

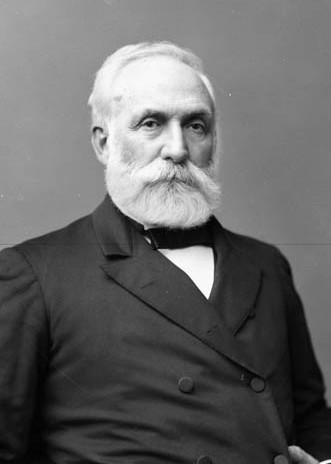
Mackenzie Bowell

- August 29 – Albert Grey, 4th Earl Grey, 9th governor general of Canada (b.1851)
- October 31 – Gilbert Ganong, businessman, politician and Lieutenant Governor of New Brunswick (b.1851)
- November 10 – Thomas Simpson Sproule, politician and Speaker of the House of Commons of Canada (b.1843)
- October 30 – Talbot Papineau, lawyer and soldier (b.1883)
- December 10 – Mackenzie Bowell, politician and 5th prime minister of Canada (b.1823)
