= 1914 in Canada =

- Decades: 1890s; 1900s; 1910s; 1920s; 1930s
- See also: History of Canada; Timeline of Canadian history; List of years in Canada

Events from the year 1914 in Canada.

== Incumbents ==
=== Crown ===
- Monarch – George V

=== Federal government ===
- Governor General – Prince Arthur, Duke of Connaught and Strathearn
- Prime Minister – Robert Borden
- Chief Justice – Charles Fitzpatrick (Quebec)
- Parliament – 12th

=== Provincial governments ===
==== Lieutenant governors ====
- Lieutenant Governor of Alberta – George H. V. Bulyea
- Lieutenant Governor of British Columbia – Thomas Wilson Paterson (until December 5) then Francis Stillman Barnard
- Lieutenant Governor of Manitoba – Douglas Colin Cameron
- Lieutenant Governor of New Brunswick – Josiah Wood
- Lieutenant Governor of Nova Scotia – James Drummond McGregor
- Lieutenant Governor of Ontario – John Morison Gibson (until September 26) then John Strathearn Hendrie
- Lieutenant Governor of Prince Edward Island – Benjamin Rogers
- Lieutenant Governor of Quebec – François Langelier
- Lieutenant Governor of Saskatchewan – George W. Brown

==== Premiers ====
- Premier of Alberta – Arthur Sifton
- Premier of British Columbia – Richard McBride
- Premier of Manitoba – Rodmond Roblin
- Premier of New Brunswick – James Kidd Flemming (until December 17) then George Johnson Clarke
- Premier of Nova Scotia – George Henry Murray
- Premier of Ontario – James Whitney (until September 25) then William Hearst (from October 2)
- Premier of Prince Edward Island – John Alexander Mathieson
- Premier of Quebec – Lomer Gouin
- Premier of Saskatchewan – Thomas Walter Scott

=== Territorial governments ===
==== Commissioners ====
- Commissioner of Yukon – George Black
- Gold Commissioner of Yukon – George P. MacKenzie
- Commissioner of Northwest Territories – Frederick D. White

== Events ==
=== January to June ===
- March 19 – The Royal Ontario Museum opens
- April 11 – Canadian Margaret C. MacDonald is appointed Matron-in-Chief of the Canadian Nursing service band and becomes the first woman in the British Empire to reach the rank of major.
- May 14 – First major discovery of oil in western Canada at Turner Valley
- May 20 – The Niagara Falls peace conference begins. Representatives from Argentina, Brazil, Chile and the United States met for diplomatic negotiations in order to avoid war between the United States and Mexico
- May 23 – The Komagata Maru, a Japanese steamship which sailed from Japan to British Columbia carrying 376 passengers, is turned back from Canada under authority of exclusion laws prohibiting Asian immigrants. Most of the passengers returned to India.
- May 29 – Ocean liner RMS Empress of Ireland sinks in Gulf of St. Lawrence; 1,024 lives lost.
- June 19 – The Hillcrest mine disaster in Alberta kills 189 of 235, the worst mining disaster in Canadian history
- June 29 – 1914 Ontario election: Sir James Whitney's Conservatives win a fourth consecutive majority

=== July to December ===
- August 4 – World War I: United Kingdom declares war on Germany, meaning Canada, as a member of the British Empire, is in a state of war.
- August 14 – Canada's War Measures Act is passed suspending some civil rights in Canada during a crisis.
- September 9 – World War I: The creation of the Canadian Automobile Machine Gun Brigade, the first fully mechanized unit in the British Army
- September 25 – James Whitney, Premier of Ontario, dies in office
- October 1 – Edward VII Monument (Montreal) unveiled
- October 2 – William Hearst becomes Premier of Ontario
- October 3 – World War I: 33,000 Canadian troops depart for Europe, the largest force to ever cross the Atlantic Ocean at the time.
- December 17 – George J. Clark becomes Premier of New Brunswick replacing the retiring James K. Flemming

== Sport ==
- March 19 – National Hockey Association's Toronto Hockey Club win their first and only Stanley Cup by defeating Pacific Coast Hockey Association's Victoria Aristocrats three games to none. All games were played at Toronto's Arena Gardens
- December 5 – Toronto Argonauts win their first Grey Cup by defeating the University of Toronto Varsity Blues 14 to 2 in the 6th Grey Cup played at Toronto's Varsity Stadium

=== Full date unknown ===
- All-time high levels of immigration are ended by the war
- The Better Farming Train made its first tour of Saskatchewan.
- Canada suspends the convertibility of the dollar into gold
- Edmonton adopts a new numbered street and avenue pattern
- Ontario passes a worker's compensation act that provides all workers with funding in case of disability

== Births ==
=== January to March ===
- January 17 – Kurt Freund, physician and sexologist (d.1996)
- February 2 – Eric Kierans, economist and politician (d.2004)
- March 13 – W. O. Mitchell, writer (d.1998)

=== April to June ===
- April 2 – Edwin Alonzo Boyd, criminal and leader of the Boyd Gang (d.2002)
- April 11
  - Norman McLaren, animator and film director (d.1987)
  - Robert Stanfield, politician and 24th Premier of Nova Scotia (d.2003)
- April 14 – Robert Bend, politician (d.1999)
- April 18 – Claire Martin, Canadian author (d.2014)
- May 3 – Ernest Smith, soldier and Victoria Cross recipient in 1944 (d.2005)
- May 9 – Hank Snow, country music artist (d.1999)
- May 15 – Angus MacLean, politician and 27th Premier of Prince Edward Island (d.2000)
- May 16 – Eric Coy, discus thrower and shot putter (d.1985)
- May 19 – Alex Shibicky, ice hockey player (d.2005)
- May 27 – Hugh Le Caine, physicist, composer and instrument builder (d.1977)
- June 16 – Lucien Rivard, criminal and prison escapee (d.2002)
- June 21 – William Vickrey, professor of economics and Nobel Laureate (d.1996)

=== July to December ===
- July 1 – Stephen Juba, politician and Mayor of Winnipeg (d.1993)
- July 6 – Viola Desmond, black civil rights advocate (d. 1965)
- July 7 – Harry Strom, politician and 9th Premier of Alberta (d.1984)
- July 10 – Joe Shuster, comic book artist, co-creator of Superman (& nephew of Frank Shuster) (d.1992)
- July 19 – John Kenneth Macalister, World War II hero (d.1944)
- July 24 – Ed Mirvish, businessman, philanthropist and theatrical impresario (d.2007)
- August 2 – Félix Leclerc, folk singer, poet, writer, actor and political activist (d.1988)
- August 14 – Francis Lawrence Jobin, politician and Lieutenant Governor of Manitoba (d.1995)
- September 12 – Janusz Żurakowski, fighter and test pilot, first test pilot of Avro Arrow (d.2004)
- October 14 – Michael D. Moore, film director, second unit director and silent-era child actor (d.2013)
- November 28 – Mud Bruneteau, professional ice hockey forward who played for the Detroit Red Wings (d.1992)
- December 10 – Frank Thurston, engineer
- December 25 – Charles-Noël Barbès, politician and lawyer (d.2008)
- December 26 – Crawford Gordon, businessman (d.1967)

=== Full date unknown ===
- Shlomo Hestrin, Canadian-born Israeli biochemist (d.1962)
- Kay Tremblay, actress (d.2005)

== Deaths ==
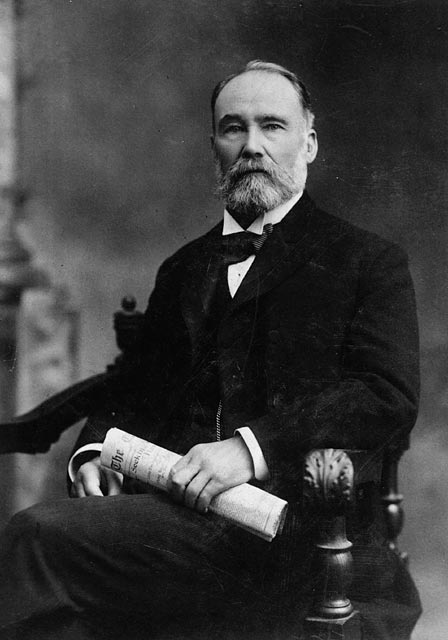
George William Ross

- January 21 – Donald Alexander Smith, politician (b.1820)
- January 27 – Daniel Woodley Prowse, lawyer, politician, judge, historian and essayist (b.1834)
- March 1 – Gilbert Elliot-Murray-Kynynmound, 4th Earl of Minto, Governor General of Canada (b.1845)
- March 7 – George William Ross, educator, politician and 5th Premier of Ontario (b.1841)
- March 9 – Robert Christie, Ontario businessman and politician (b. 1826)
- April 7 – Edith Maude Eaton, author (b.1865)

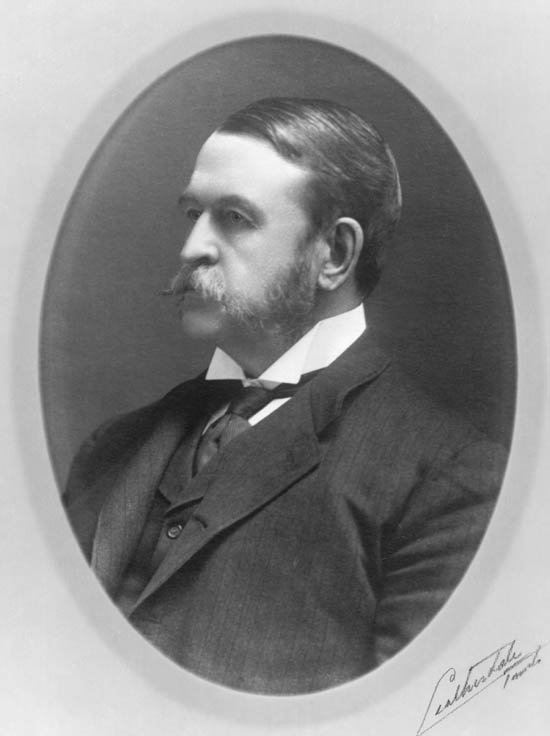
James Whitney

- May 2 – John Campbell, 9th Duke of Argyll, Governor General of Canada (b.1845)
- July 9 – Henry Emmerson, lawyer, businessman, politician, philanthropist and 8th Premier of New Brunswick (b.1853)
- July 27 – Archibald Blue, teacher, journalist, and civil servant (b.1840)
- September 25 – James Whitney, politician and 6th Premier of Ontario (b.1843)

== See also ==
- List of Canadian films
