= 1916 in Canada =

- Decades: 1890s; 1900s; 1910s; 1920s; 1930s
- See also: History of Canada; Timeline of Canadian history; List of years in Canada

Events from the year 1916 in Canada.

== Incumbents ==
=== Crown ===
- Monarch – George V

=== Federal government ===
- Governor General – Duke of Connaught and Strathearn (until November 11) then Victor Cavendish, 9th Duke of Devonshire
- Prime Minister – Robert Borden
- Chief Justice – Charles Fitzpatrick (Quebec)
- Parliament – 12th

=== Provincial governments ===
==== Lieutenant governors ====
- Lieutenant Governor of Alberta – Robert Brett
- Lieutenant Governor of British Columbia – Francis Stillman Barnard
- Lieutenant Governor of Manitoba – Douglas Colin Cameron (until August 3) then James Albert Manning Aikins
- Lieutenant Governor of New Brunswick – Josiah Wood
- Lieutenant Governor of Nova Scotia – David MacKeen (until November 13) then MacCallum Grant (from November 29)
- Lieutenant Governor of Ontario – John Strathearn Hendrie
- Lieutenant Governor of Prince Edward Island – Augustine Colin Macdonald
- Lieutenant Governor of Quebec – Pierre-Évariste Leblanc
- Lieutenant Governor of Saskatchewan – Richard Stuart Lake

==== Premiers ====
- Premier of Alberta – Arthur Sifton
- Premier of British Columbia – William John Bowser (until November 23) then Harlan Brewster
- Premier of Manitoba – Tobias Norris
- Premier of New Brunswick – George Johnson Clarke
- Premier of Nova Scotia – George Henry Murray
- Premier of Ontario – William Hearst
- Premier of Prince Edward Island – John Mathieson
- Premier of Quebec – Lomer Gouin
- Premier of Saskatchewan – Thomas Walter Scott (until October 20) then William Melville Martin

=== Territorial governments ===
==== Commissioners ====
- Commissioner of Yukon – George Black (until October 13) then George Norris Williams (acting)
- Gold Commissioner of Yukon – George P. MacKenzie
- Commissioner of Northwest Territories – Frederick D. White

== Events ==
=== January to June ===
- January 28 – Women are given the right to vote in Manitoba, after protests by people such as Nellie McClung
- February 3 – The Centre Block of the Parliament Buildings in Ottawa burns down
- February 10 – An anti-German riot hits Calgary
- March 14 – Saskatchewan women get the vote
- March 30 – National Hockey Association's Montreal Canadiens win their First Stanley Cup by defeating the Pacific Coast Hockey Association's Portland Rosebuds 3 games to 2. All Games were played at Montreal's Montreal Arena.
- April 19 – Alberta women get the vote
- June – Rodeo's first side-delivery chute is designed and made by the Bascom brothers on their Bar-B-3 Ranch at Welling, Alberta.
- May 7 – The Government of Canada authorizes the creation of an all black battalion that became No. 2 Construction Battalion, Canadian Expeditionary Force.
- June 1–13 – WWI: Canadians fight in the Battle of Mont Sorrel

=== July to December ===
- July 1 – Prohibition of alcohol introduced in Alberta
- July 1 – November 18 – 25,000 Canadians and Newfoundlanders are casualties at the Battle of the Somme
- July 24 – Earl Bascom enters his first steer riding contest at Welling, Alberta.
- July 29 – The Matheson Fire in the region northwest of North Bay, Ontario, begins. It eventually kills between 200 and 250 people and destroys six towns, including Matheson and Cochrane
- August 11 – The 4th Canadian Division arrives in France
- October 20 – William M. Martin becomes premier of Saskatchewan, replacing Walter Scott
- November 11 – Victor Cavendish, 9th Duke of Devonshire, becomes Governor General of Canada replacing Prince Arthur, Duke of Connaught
- November 23 – Harlan Brewster becomes premier of British Columbia, replacing William John Bowser
- December 1 – An Order in Council authorizes an increase of troops to 500,000 in the First World War

=== Full date unknown ===
- The National Research Council of Canada is established.
- The first Doukhobors arrive in Alberta
- Emily Murphy became the first female magistrate in Canada, and in the British Empire.

== Arts and literature ==
=== New works ===
- Lucy Maud Montgomery – The Watchman & Other Poems
- Max Aitken – Canada in Flanders
- Alfred Laliberté – Les petits Baigneurs

== Sport ==
- March 30 – The National Hockey Association's Montreal Canadiens beat the Portland Rosebuds of the Pacific Coast Hockey Association 3 games to 2 to win their first Stanley Cup. All games were played at the Montreal Arena.

== Births ==
=== January to June ===
- January 22 – Bill Durnan, ice hockey player (d.1972)
- January 28 – Dottie Hunter, baseball player (d. 2005)
- February 4 – Pudlo Pudlat, artist (d.1992)
- February 10 – Claude Bissell, author and educator (d.2000)
- February 18 – Jean Drapeau, lawyer, politician and Mayor of Montreal (d.1999)
- February 23 – Molly Kool, North America's first registered female sea captain (d.2009)
- March 10 – Davie Fulton, politician and judge (d.2000)
- April 18 – Ian Wahn, politician and lawyer (d.1999)
- April 27 – Myfanwy Pavelic, artist (d.2007)
- May 3 – Léopold Simoneau, lyric tenor (d.2006)
- May 4 – Jane Jacobs, urbanist, writer and activist (d.2006)
- May 14 – Sammy Luftspring, boxer (d.2000)
- May 30 – Jack Dennett, radio and television announcer (d.1975)
- June 20 – Jean-Jacques Bertrand, politician and 21st Premier of Quebec (d.1973)
- June 27 – Marthe Létourneau, soprano and teacher (d. 1998)

=== July to December ===
- July 4 – Fernand Leduc, painter (d.2014)
- July 16 – John Gallagher, geologist and businessman (d.1998)

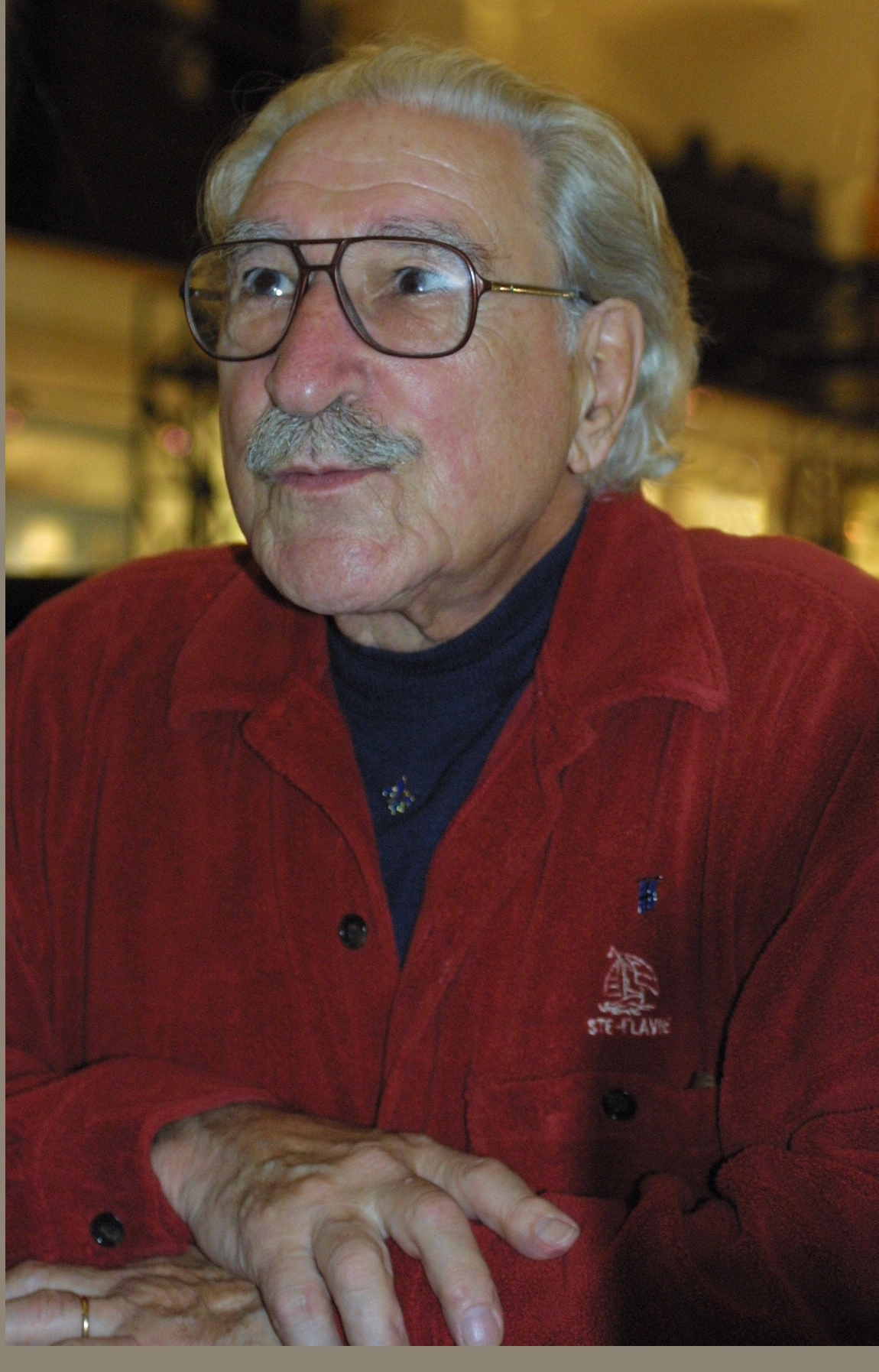
Michel Chartrand in 2003

- July 21 – Wilfred Cantwell Smith, professor of comparative religion (d.2000)
- August 1 – Anne Hébert, author and poet (d.2000)
- August 7 – Rose Wolfe, social worker and academic administrator (d.2016)
- September 5 – Frank Shuster, comedian (d.2002)
- September 18 – Laura Sabia, social activist and feminist (d.1996)
- October 9 – Bill Allum, ice hockey player (d.1992)
- October 30 – Roy Brown Jr., car design engineer (Edsel, Ford Consul, Ford Cortina) (d.2013)
- November 17 – Martin J. Légère, businessman (d.2013)
- November 23 – P. K. Page, poet (d.2010)
- December 5 – Lomer Brisson, politician and lawyer (d.1981)
- December 16 – Harry Gunning, scientist and administrator (d.2002)
- December 20 – Michel Chartrand, activist (d.2010)

=== Full date unknown ===
- John Wintermeyer, politician (d.1994)

== Deaths ==
- February 3 – Bowman Brown Law, politician (b.1855)
- May 12 – Joseph-Aldric Ouimet, politician (b.1848)
- May 29 – Louis-Alphonse Boyer, politician (b.1839)
- June 27 – Daniel Webster Marsh, businessman and Mayor of Calgary (b.1838)
- July 28 – Pierre-Amand Landry, lawyer, judge and politician (b.1846)
- August 8 – Edgar Dewdney, politician, Lieutenant Governor of Northwest Territories and Lieutenant Governor of British Columbia (b.1835)
- December 12 – Albert Lacombe, missionary (b.1827)

=== Full date unknown ===
- Grace Annie Lockhart, first woman in the British Empire to receive a Bachelor's degree (b.1855)

== See also ==
- List of Canadian films
