= 1845 in Canada =

- Decades: 1820s; 1830s; 1840s; 1850s; 1860s
- See also: History of Canada; Timeline of Canadian history; List of years in Canada

Events from the year 1845 in Canada.

== Incumbents ==
- Monarch: Victoria

=== Federal government ===
- Parliament: 2nd

=== Governors ===
- Governor General of the Province of Canada: Charles Metcalfe, 1st Baron Metcalfe (until 26 November); Charles Cathcart, 2nd Earl Cathcart (from 26 November)
- Governor of New Brunswick: William MacBean George Colebrooke
- Governor of Nova Scotia: Lucius Cary, 10th Viscount Falkland
- Civil Governor of Newfoundland: John Harvey
- Governor of Prince Edward Island: Henry Vere Huntley

=== Premiers ===
- Joint Premiers of the Province of Canada —
  - William Henry Draper, Canada West Premier
  - Denis-Benjamin Viger, Canada East Premier

== Events ==
- Halifax native Samuel Cunard chooses Boston as the western terminus for his steamships.
- Lord Cathcart, the new governor, arrives.
- The Rebellion Losses Commission sits.
- The Welland Canal is opened.

== Births ==
=== January to June ===
- January 9 – Laure Conan, novelist (died 1924)
- January 14 – Henry Petty-Fitzmaurice, 5th Marquess of Lansdowne, Governor General of Canada (died 1927)
- February 13 – William James Topley, photographer (died 1930)
- April 5 – Leonard Burnett, politician, farmer and teacher (died 1932)
- May 4 – Louis Henry Davies, lawyer, businessman, politician and 3rd Premier of Prince Edward Island (died 1924)

=== July to December ===
- July 9 – Gilbert Elliot-Murray-Kynynmound, 4th Earl of Minto, Governor General of Canada (died 1914)

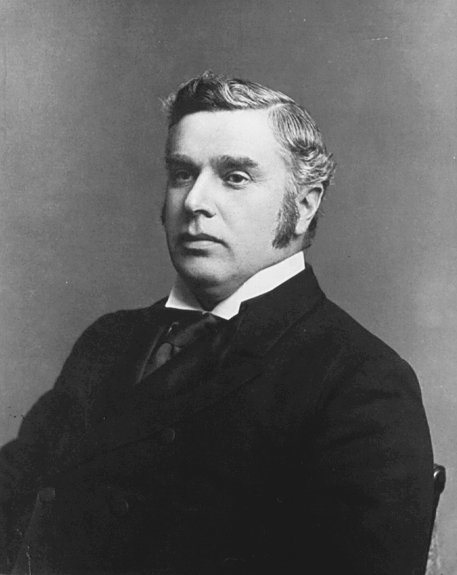
John Sparrow David Thompson

- July 20 – Charles-Eusèbe Dionne, naturalist and taxidermist (died 1925)
- August 6 – John Campbell, 9th Duke of Argyll, Governor General of Canada (died 1914)
- November 10 – John Sparrow David Thompson, lawyer, judge, politician, and 4th Prime Minister of Canada (died 1894)
- December 15 – Edward Charles Bowers, politician (died 1929)
