= 1919 in Canada =

- Decades: 1890s; 1900s; 1910s; 1920s; 1930s
- See also: History of Canada; Timeline of Canadian history; List of years in Canada

Events from the year 1919 in Canada.

== Incumbents ==
=== Crown ===
- Monarch – George V

=== Federal government ===
- Governor General – Victor Cavendish, 9th Duke of Devonshire
- Prime Minister – Robert Borden
- Chief Justice – Louis Henry Davies (Prince Edward Island)
- Parliament – 13th

=== Provincial governments ===
==== Lieutenant governors ====
- Lieutenant Governor of Alberta – Robert Brett
- Lieutenant Governor of British Columbia – Francis S. Barnard (until December 9) then Edward Gawler Prior
- Lieutenant Governor of Manitoba – James Albert Manning Aikins
- Lieutenant Governor of New Brunswick – William Pugsley
- Lieutenant Governor of Nova Scotia – MacCallum Grant
- Lieutenant Governor of Ontario – John Strathearn Hendrie (until November 20) then Lionel Herbert Clarke
- Lieutenant Governor of Prince Edward Island – Augustine Colin Macdonald (until July 16) then Murdock MacKinnon (from September 2)
- Lieutenant Governor of Quebec – Charles Fitzpatrick
- Lieutenant Governor of Saskatchewan – Richard Stuart Lake

==== Premiers ====
- Premier of Alberta – Charles Stewart
- Premier of British Columbia – John Oliver
- Premier of Manitoba – Tobias Norris
- Premier of New Brunswick – Walter Foster
- Premier of Nova Scotia – George Henry Murray
- Premier of Ontario – William Hearst (until November 14) then Ernest Drury
- Premier of Prince Edward Island – Aubin Arsenault (until September 9) then John Howatt Bell
- Premier of Quebec – Lomer Gouin
- Premier of Saskatchewan – William Melville Martin

=== Territorial governments ===
==== Commissioners ====
- Gold Commissioner of Yukon – George P. MacKenzie
- Commissioner of Northwest Territories – William Wallace Cory

== Events ==
=== January to June ===
- January 19 – Canadian troops take part in the Battle of Shenkursk, part of the Russian Civil War.
- February 17 – Wilfrid Laurier, leader of the Liberal Party of Canada and former prime minister of Canada, dies in office.
- April 17 – New Brunswick women are permitted to vote.
- April 10 – The Quebec referendum on the prohibition of alcohol.
- May 3 – Yukon women are permitted to vote.
- May 15 – June 25 – Winnipeg General Strike of 1919.
- May 22 – The House of Commons passes the Nickle Resolution.
- June – Rodeo's first reverse-opening side-delivery bronc chute is designed and made by rodeo cowboy Earl W. Bascom at the Bascom Ranch in Lethbridge, Alberta
- June 6 – The government-owned Canadian National Railway is formed out of a number of financially troubled private railways.
- June 28 – Canada signs the Treaty of Versailles, formally ending the First World War

=== July to December ===
- September 1 – Prince Edward, Prince of Wales, opens the third session of the 13th Canadian Parliament
- September 6 – George-Étienne Cartier Monument unveiled
- September 9 – John Howatt Bell becomes premier of Prince Edward Island, replacing Aubin Arsenault.
- October 20 – Ontario election: Ernest C. Drury's United Farmers of Ontario win a majority, defeating Sir William Hearst's Conservatives.
- November 14 – Ernest Drury becomes premier of Ontario, replacing Sir William Hearst.

=== Full date unknown ===
- Influenza epidemic in Alberta.
- Monument aux braves de N.D.G. unveiled

== Arts and literature ==
- February 27 – Robert Harris, Canadian painter (b. 1848)

== Sport ==
- December 22 – Toronto Arenas become the Toronto St. Patricks
- March 19–22 – Ontario Hockey Association's University of Toronto Schools win the first Memorial Cup by defeating the Saskatchewan Amateur Hockey Association's Regina Pats 29–8 in a two-game aggregate at the Arena Gardens in Toronto

== Births ==
=== January to June ===
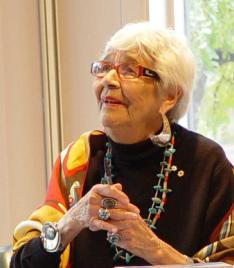
Daphne Odjig

- January 13 – Igor Gouzenko, Russian defector (d. 1982)
- January 23 – Frances Bay, actress (d. 2011)
- February 17 – J. M. S. Careless, historian (d. 2009)
- February 20
  - Thomas Ide, educator and the founding Chairman of TVOntario (d. 1996)
  - Joe Krol, Canadian football player (d. 2008)
- March 21 – Victor Copps, politician and Mayor of Hamilton (d. 1988)
- March 26 – Vernon Singer, politician (d. 2003)
- April 16 – Louis Harrington Lewry, politician and reporter (d. 1992)
- April 21 – William Perehudoff, painter (d. 2013)
- May 27 – Francess Halpenny, editor and professor (d. 2017)
- May 29 – Jacques Genest, physician and academic (d. 2018)
- June 18 – Gordon A. Smith, artist and teacher (d. 2020)
- June 19
  - Gérard Dionne, Roman Catholic bishop (d. 2020)
  - Simon Reisman, civil servant and chief negotiator of the Canada-United States Free Trade Agreement (d. 2008)
- June 21 – Gérard Pelletier, journalist, editor, politician and Minister (d. 1997)

=== July to December ===
- July 5 – Gordon Towers, politician and Lieutenant-Governor of Alberta (d. 1999)
- August 1 – Jack Butterfield, President of the American Hockey League (1969–1994) (d. 2010)
- August 9 – Edmund Hockridge, singer and actor (d. 2009)
- August 19 – Margaret Marquis, Canadian-American actress (d. 1993)
- August 21 – Marcel Lambert, politician and Speaker of the House of Commons of Canada (d. 2000)
- September 1 – Gladys Davis, professional baseball player (d. 1991)
- September 11 – Daphne Odjig, artist (d. 2016)

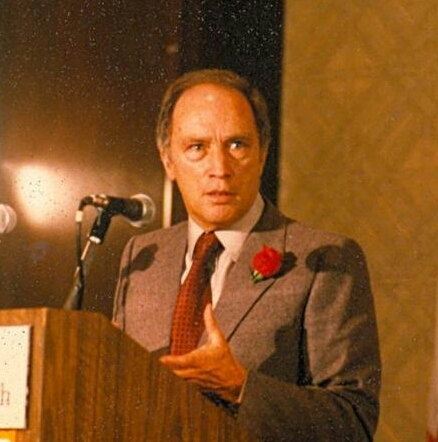
Pierre Trudeau in 1980

- October 12 – Gilles Beaudoin, politician and mayor of Trois-Rivières (d. 2007)
- October 17 – Violet Milstead, World War II aviator and bush pilot (d. 2014)
- October 18 – Pierre Trudeau, politician and 15th Prime Minister of Canada (d. 2000)
- November 1 – Russell Bannock, aviator and test pilot (d. 2020)
- November 14 – Albert Ludwig, politician (d. 2019)
- November 21 – Eleanor Collins, jazz singer (d. 2024)
- December 10 – Vincent Brassard, politician (d. 1974)
- December 25 – Paul David, cardiologist and founder of the Montreal Heart Institute (d. 1999)

== Deaths ==
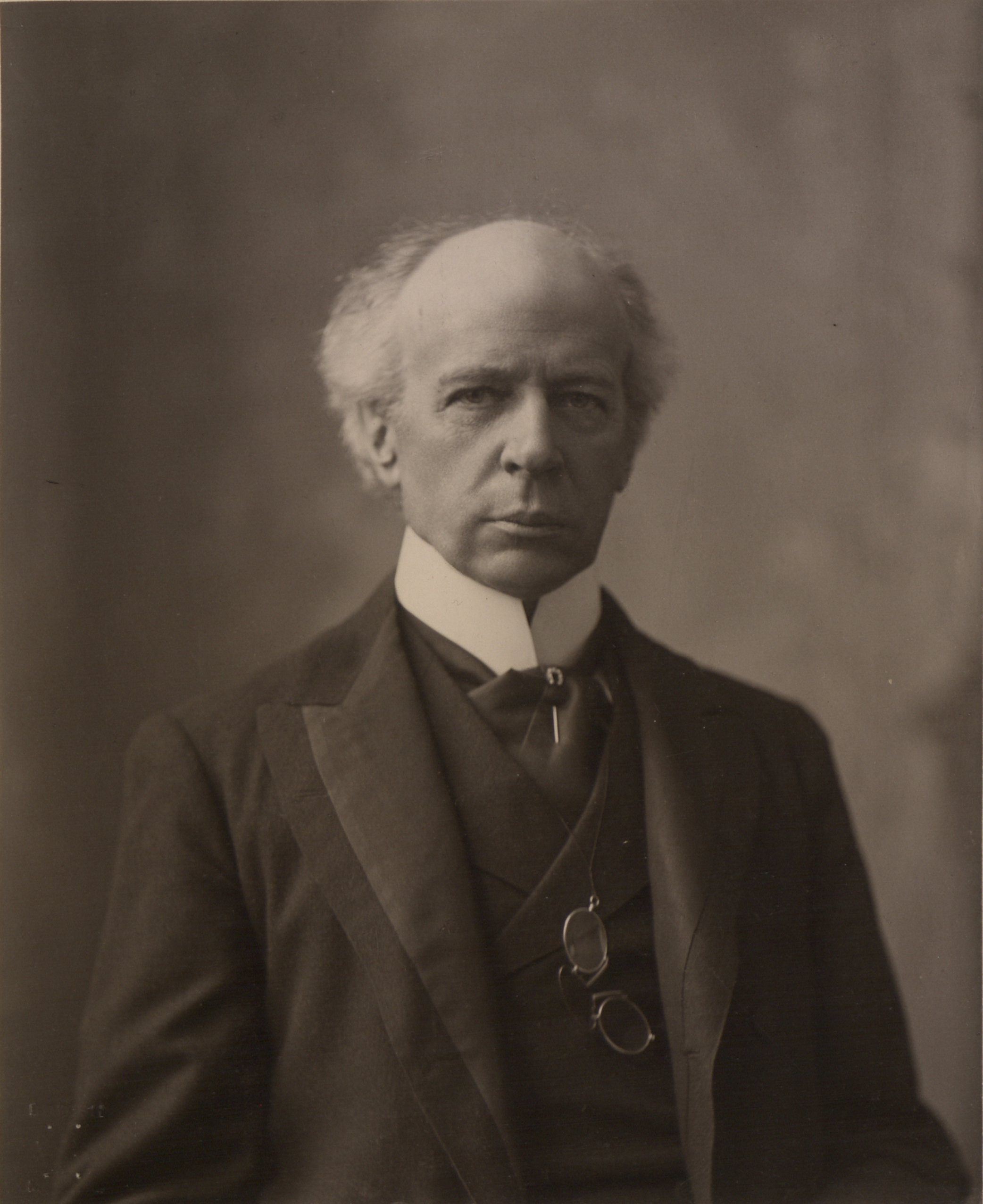
Wilfrid Laurier

- January 30 – Sam Steele, soldier and member of the North-West Mounted Police (b. 1849)
- February 17 – Wilfrid Laurier, politician and 7th Prime Minister of Canada (b. 1841)
- July 29 – Frederick Peters, lawyer, politician and Premier of Prince Edward Island (b. 1851)
- August 18 – Joseph E. Seagram, distillery founder, politician, philanthropist and racehorse owner (b. 1841)
- October 14 – Simon Hugh Holmes, publisher, lawyer, politician and Premier of Nova Scotia (b. 1831)
- November 10 – Charles Mickle, politician (b. 1849)
- November 11 – George Haddow, politician and merchant (b. 1833)
- December 10 – Arthur Boyle, politician (b. 1842)
- December 29 – William Osler, physician (b. 1849)

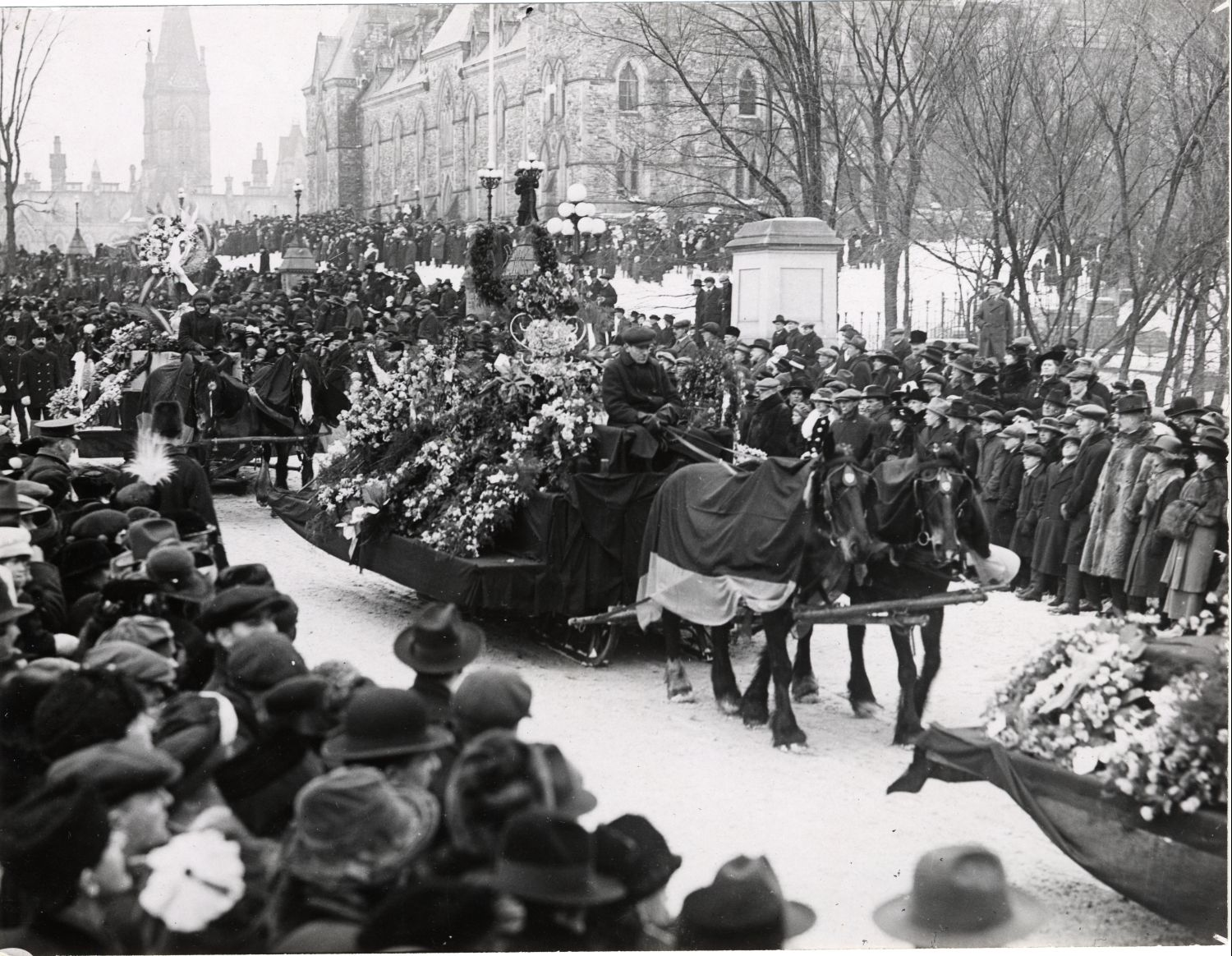
Funéraille de Wilfrid Laurier

== See also ==
- List of Canadian films
