= 1924 in Canada =

- Decades: 1900s; 1910s; 1920s; 1930s; 1940s
- See also: History of Canada; Timeline of Canadian history; List of years in Canada

Events from the year 1924 in Canada.

== Incumbents ==
=== Crown ===
- Monarch – George V

=== Federal government ===
- Governor General – Julian Byng
- Prime Minister – William Lyon Mackenzie King
- Chief Justice – Louis Henry Davies (Prince Edward Island) (until 1 May) then Francis Alexander Anglin (Ontario)
- Parliament – 14th

=== Provincial governments ===
==== Lieutenant governors ====
- Lieutenant Governor of Alberta – Robert Brett
- Lieutenant Governor of British Columbia – Walter Cameron Nichol
- Lieutenant Governor of Manitoba – James Albert Manning Aikins
- Lieutenant Governor of New Brunswick – William Frederick Todd
- Lieutenant Governor of Nova Scotia – MacCallum Grant
- Lieutenant Governor of Ontario – Henry Cockshutt
- Lieutenant Governor of Prince Edward Island – Murdock MacKinnon (until September 8) then Frank Richard Heartz
- Lieutenant Governor of Quebec – Louis-Philippe Brodeur (until January 1) then Narcisse Pérodeau (from January 8)
- Lieutenant Governor of Saskatchewan – Henry William Newlands

==== Premiers ====
- Premier of Alberta – Herbert Greenfield
- Premier of British Columbia – John Oliver
- Premier of Manitoba – John Bracken
- Premier of New Brunswick – Peter Veniot
- Premier of Nova Scotia – Ernest Howard Armstrong
- Premier of Ontario – George Howard Ferguson
- Premier of Prince Edward Island – James D. Stewart
- Premier of Quebec – Louis-Alexandre Taschereau
- Premier of Saskatchewan – Charles Avery Dunning

=== Territorial governments ===
==== Commissioners ====
- Gold Commissioner of Yukon – George P. MacKenzie
- Commissioner of Northwest Territories – William Wallace Cory

== Events ==
Canadian Red Ensign (1921–1957)

- January 3 – First session of the British Columbia Older Boys' Parliament (now the British Columbia Youth Parliament) held in Victoria, British Columbia.
- January 10 – Narcisse Pérodeau becomes Quebec's 14th Lieutenant Governor.
- January 26 – An Order in Council mandates the use of the Canadian Red Ensign on Canadian government buildings outside Canada. It the first officially allowed use of the flag on land, although it has been used unofficially for many years.
- April 1 – The Royal Canadian Air Force is formed.
- May 1 – Prince Edward Island changes from driving on the left to the right.
- May 24 – Prohibition ends in Alberta.
- June – Rodeo's first one-hand bareback rigging is designed and made by rodeo cowboy and saddle maker Earl Bascom at the Bascom Ranch in Stirling, Alberta.
- July 3 – The Chateau Lake Louise burns down
- October 24 – Former provincial treasurer Peter Smith and financier Aemilius Jarvis are found guilty in connection with the Ontario Bond Scandal.
- October 29 – An explosion kills Doukhobor leader Peter Verigin and eight other passengers on a CPR train from Brilliant to Grand Forks, British Columbia. Ten others are injured. Although never proven, it is alleged that Verigin was assassinated using a time bomb.

== Science and technology ==
- August – Mars is closer to Earth than it has been for many years and mysterious wireless signals are picked up at a Vancouver wireless station. It is thought by some to be evidence of Martian contact.
- October 21 – CFYC carried a speech made by Prime Minister Mackenzie King from the Denman Arena, considered to be Canada's first federal political broadcast.

== Sports ==
=== Basketball ===
- The Edmonton Grads win their first international basketball tournament held as part of the 1924 Summer Olympics in Paris. As it was only a demonstration sport, no medals were awarded. The Grads would dominate women's basketball tournaments from 1924 to 1936.

=== Hockey ===
- The Toronto Granite Club win the gold medal at the first Winter Olympics in Chamonix. The Canadian team beat the American team 6–1 after a ferocious, injury-filled game.
- March 25 – the National Hockey League's Montreal Canadiens win their second Stanley Cup by defeating the Western Canada Hockey League's Calgary Tigers 2 games to 0. The deciding game was played in Ottawa's Ottawa Auditorium.
- March 26 and 28 – Ontario Hockey Association's Owen Sound Greys won their first Memorial Cup by defeating Calgary City Junior Hockey League's Calgary Canadians 7 to 5 in 2 game aggregate played at Shea's Amphitheatre in Winnipeg
- November 29 – The Montreal Forum opens

=== Football ===
- November 29 – Queen's University wins their third and final Grey Cup by defeating the Toronto Balmy Beach Beachers 11–3 in the 12th Grey Cup played at Toronto's Varsity Stadium

== Births ==
=== January to March ===
- January 5 – Gerry Plamondon, ice hockey player (d. 2019)
- January 10 – Ludmilla Chiriaeff, ballet dancer, choreographer and director (d. 1996)
- January 29 – Marcelle Ferron, painter and stained glass artist (d. 2001)
- January 29 – Lois Marshall, soprano (d. 1997)
- February 3 – Martial Asselin, politician and Lieutenant Governor of Quebec (d. 2013)
- February 7 – Ivor Dent, politician and mayor of Edmonton (d. 2009)
- February 18 – Nicolo Rizzuto, Italian-Canadian mobster (d. 2010)
- February 24
  - Remi De Roo, Roman Catholic bishop (d. 2022)
  - Douglas Jung, politician and first Chinese Canadian MP in the House of Commons of Canada (d. 2002)
  - Erik Nielsen, politician (d. 2008)
- March 11 – Eva Von Gencsy, dancer (d. 2013)
- March 18 – Johnny Papalia, mobster (d. 1997)

=== April to June ===
- April 5 – Orville Howard Phillips, politician and Senator (d. 2009)
- April 20 – Guy Rocher, sociologist and academic (d. 2025)
- April 29 – Al Balding, golfer (d. 2006)
- May 26 – Nancy Bell, senator (d. 1989)
- May 28 – Paul Hébert, actor (d. 2017)
- June 2 – June Callwood, journalist, author and social activist (d. 2007)
- June 3 – Colleen Dewhurst, actress (d. 1991)
- June 22 – Larkin Kerwin, physicist, President of the Canadian Space Agency (d. 2004)
- June 14 – Arthur Erickson, architect and urban planner (d. 2009)
- June 21 – Wally Fawkes, Canadian-born jazz clarinettist and cartoonist (d. 2023 in the United Kingdom)

=== July to September ===
- July 11 – Eugene Whelan, politician and Minister (d. 2013)
- July 20 – Mort Garson, electronic musician (d. 2008)
- July 21 – Lynn R. Williams, labour leader (d. 2014)
- July 29 – Lloyd Bochner, actor (d. 2005)
- July 30 – Roland Penner, politician (d. 2018)
- September 13 – Léonel Beaudoin, politician (d. 2021)
- September 19 – Don Harron, comedian, actor, director, journalist, author and composer (d. 2015)

=== October to December ===
- October 18 – Buddy MacMaster, fiddle player (d. 2014)
- November 1 – Jean-Luc Pépin, academic, politician and Minister (d. 1995)
- November 10 – Danny Cameron, politician (d. c2009)
- November 11 – Evelyn Wawryshyn, baseball player
- November 24 – Lorne Munroe, Canadian-American cellist and educator (d. 2020)
- December 6 – Donald Jack, novelist and playwright (d. 2003)
- December 15 – Robert B. Salter, surgeon (d. 2010)
- December 19 – Doug Harvey, ice hockey player (d. 1989)
- December 20 – Judy LaMarsh, politician and Minister, lawyer, author and broadcaster (d. 1980)
- December 22 – A. Edison Stairs, businessman and politician, New Brunswick MLA (1960–1978) and Minister of Finance (1974–1976), natural causes (d. 2010)

== Deaths ==
- January 23 – James Wilson Morrice, painter (b.1865)
- May 1 – Louis Henry Davies, lawyer, businessman, politician and 3rd Premier of Prince Edward Island (b.1845)
- June 6 – Laure Conan, novelist (b.1845)
- August 13 – Joseph Bolduc, politician, Speaker of the Senate (b. 1847)
- September 21 – Edouard Deville, cartographer and Surveyor General of Canada (b.1850)
- October 29 – Peter Verigin, philosopher, activist and leader and preacher of the Doukhobors (b.1859)
- December 9 – Judson Burpee Black, physician and politician (b.1842)

== See also ==
- List of Canadian films
