= 1847 in Canada =

- Decades: 1820s; 1830s; 1840s; 1850s; 1860s
- See also: History of Canada; Timeline of Canadian history; List of years in Canada

Events from the year 1847 in Canada.

== Incumbents ==
- Monarch: Victoria

=== Federal government ===
- Parliament: 2nd (until December)

=== Governors ===
- Governor General of the Province of Canada: Charles Cathcart, 2nd Earl Cathcart (until 30 January); James Bruce, 8th Earl of Elgin (starting 30 January)
- Governor of New Brunswick: William MacBean George Colebrooke
- Governor of Nova Scotia: Lucius Cary, 10th Viscount Falkland
- Civil Governor of Newfoundland: John Harvey
- Governor of Prince Edward Island: Henry Vere Huntley

=== Premiers ===
- Joint Premiers of the Province of Canada —
  - William Henry Draper, Canada West Premier
  - Denis-Benjamin Viger, Canada East Premier

== Events ==
- January 30 – Lord Elgin, Governor, arrives at Montreal.
- September 1 – Lord Elgin visits the Irish fever sheds at Windmill Point, Montreal, during the typhus epidemic of 1847.
- October 18 – Telegraph Line from Quebec to London, Canada West, complete.
- October 23 – 65 immigrants die in a week at Pointe St. Charles neighbourhood of Montreal.
- November 1 – 9,634 deaths of immigrants since 1 January
- November 19 – The railway from Montreal to Lachine is opened.

=== Full date unknown ===
- St. Lawrence canal system completed. Faster and cheaper than US system, but growing US railroads are now the real threat.
- Typhus outbreak as over 3,000 immigrants arrive in Bytown (Ottawa) in the height of summer. The Rideau Canal is shut down to prevent further spread of the outbreak. 167 die in quarantine.
- Outbreak of measles among the Cayuse of the Pacific Northwest.
- Fort Yukon established.

== Births ==
- February 25 – John Watson, Canadian philosopher (born in Scotland) (died 1939)
- March 3 – Alexander Graham Bell, scientist, inventor, engineer and innovator who is credited with inventing the first practical telephone (died 1922)
- March 12 – George Hope Bertram, politician (born in Scotland) (died 1933)
- April 18 - Oliver Aiken Howland, lawyer and politician, 31st Mayor of Toronto (died 1905)
- June 22 – Joseph Bolduc, politician, Speaker of the Senate (died 1924)
- July 31 – Samuel Bridgeland, politician (died 1903)
- August 3 – John Hamilton-Gordon, 1st Marquess of Aberdeen and Temair, Governor General of Canada (died 1934)
- September 3 – George Eulas Foster, politician and academic (died 1931)
- September 8 – Abraham Groves, physician
- October 9 – William Anderson Black, politician (died 1934)
- November 1 – Emma Albani, soprano (died 1930)
- November 3 – George Thomas Baird, politician, Senator for Victoria, New Brunswick (died 1917)
- November 11 – Adam Carr Bell, politician, Leader of the Opposition of Nova Scotia (died 1912)
- November 16 – Edmund James Flynn, politician and Premier of Quebec (died 1927)
- November 24 – Alexander Edmund Batson Davie, politician and 7th Premier of British Columbia (died 1889)
- December 10 – John M. Baillie, politician, member of the Nova Scotia House of Assembly (died 1913)
- December 29 – Alexis-Xyste Bernard, Roman Catholic bishop (died 1923)

=== Full date unknown ===
- Phoebe Campbell, convicted murderer (died 1872)

== Deaths ==
- June 11 – John Franklin, naval officer, Arctic explorer, and author (born 1786)
- June 13 – Colin Campbell, army officer and colonial administrator (born 1776)
