= 1987 in Canada =

- Decades: 1960s; 1970s; 1980s; 1990s; 2000s
- See also: History of Canada; Timeline of Canadian history; List of years in Canada

Events from the year 1987 in Canada.

== Incumbents ==
=== Crown ===
- Monarch – Elizabeth II

=== Federal government ===
- Governor General – Jeanne Sauvé
- Prime Minister – Brian Mulroney
- Chief Justice – Brian Dickson (Manitoba)
- Parliament – 33rd

=== Provincial governments ===
==== Lieutenant governors ====
- Lieutenant Governor of Alberta – Helen Hunley
- Lieutenant Governor of British Columbia – Robert Gordon Rogers
- Lieutenant Governor of Manitoba – George Johnson
- Lieutenant Governor of New Brunswick – George Stanley (until August 20) then Gilbert Finn
- Lieutenant Governor of Newfoundland – James McGrath
- Lieutenant Governor of Nova Scotia – Alan Abraham
- Lieutenant Governor of Ontario – Lincoln Alexander
- Lieutenant Governor of Prince Edward Island – Lloyd MacPhail
- Lieutenant Governor of Quebec – Gilles Lamontagne
- Lieutenant Governor of Saskatchewan – Frederick Johnson

==== Premiers ====
- Premier of Alberta – Don Getty
- Premier of British Columbia – Bill Vander Zalm
- Premier of Manitoba – Howard Pawley
- Premier of New Brunswick – Richard Hatfield (until October 27) then Frank McKenna
- Premier of Newfoundland – Brian Peckford
- Premier of Nova Scotia – John Buchanan
- Premier of Ontario – David Peterson
- Premier of Prince Edward Island – Joe Ghiz
- Premier of Quebec – Robert Bourassa
- Premier of Saskatchewan – Grant Devine

=== Territorial governments ===
==== Commissioners ====
- Commissioner of Yukon – John Kenneth McKinnon
- Commissioner of Northwest Territories – John Havelock Parker

==== Premiers ====
- Premier of the Northwest Territories – Nick Sibbeston (until November 12) then Dennis Patterson
- Premier of Yukon – Tony Penikett

== Events ==
- January 1 – Frobisher Bay changes its name to Iqaluit.
- April 21 – The lifeless body of Claude Jutra was finally found in the Saint Lawrence River near Cap-Santé.
- April 30 – Provincial premiers agree to Meech Lake Accord.
- May 22 – Rick Hansen returns home to Vancouver after his Man in Motion world tour.
- June 30 – Canada introduces a $1 coin, commonly called loonie; the dollar bill is withdrawn in 1989.
  - a bill to restore the death penalty was defeated by the House of Commons in a 148–127 vote, in which Prime Minister Brian Mulroney, Minister of Justice Ray Hnatyshyn, and Minister of External Affairs Joe Clark opposed the bill, whereas Deputy Prime Minister Donald Mazankowski and a majority of Progressive Conservative MPs supported it.
- July 3 – Quebec City becomes the first city in North America to become a UNESCO World Heritage Site.
- July 14 – Montreal is hit by a series of severe thunderstorms during the Montreal Flood of 1987.
- July 31 – The Edmonton Tornado kills 27 people.
- September 10 – Ontario election: David Peterson's Liberals win a majority.
- September 20 – Pope John Paul II visits the Northwest Territories.
- October – Canadian and American negotiators reach agreement on the Canadian-American Free Trade Agreement.
- October 27 – Frank McKenna becomes premier of New Brunswick, replacing Richard Hatfield.
- October 31 – The Reform Party of Canada is founded.
- November 12 – Dennis Patterson becomes government leader of the Northwest Territories, replacing Nick Sibbeston.
- November 17: Anthony Griffin is shot and killed in Montreal. Months of protests and two court cases ensue.
- November 30 – Several new Canadian specialty channels are licensed: YTV, VisionTV, CBC Newsworld, The Weather Network/MeteoMedia, and one pay-television channel: The Family Channel.
- December 16 – Chartwell Technology company is founded in British Columbia.

=== Undated ===
- ElderTreks, Canadian adventure travel company is founded.

== Arts and literature ==
=== New works ===
- William Bell: Metal Head
- Dave Duncan: A Rose-Red City
- Michael Ignatieff: The Russian Album
- Irving Layton: Fortunate Exile
- Donald Jack: This One's on Me
- Steve McCaffery: Evoba
- Antonine Maillet: Margot la folle
- Farley Mowat: Virunga: The Passion of Dian Fossey
- Paul Quarrington, King Leary
- Mordecai Richler: Jacob Two-Two and the Dinosaur

=== Awards ===
- See 1987 Governor General's Awards for a complete list of winners and finalists for those awards.
- Books in Canada First Novel Award: Karen Lawrence, The Life of Helen Alone
- Gerald Lampert Award: Rosemary Sullivan, The Space a Name Makes
- Marian Engel Award: Audrey Thomas
- Pat Lowther Award: Heather Spears, How to Read Faces
- Stephen Leacock Award: W.P. Kinsella, The Fencepost Chronicles
- Trillium Book Award: Michael Ondaatje, In the Skin of a Lion
- Vicky Metcalf Award: Robert Munsch

=== Music ===
- November 27 – Rock band Cowboy Junkies record their most famous album, The Trinity Session, at Toronto's Church of the Holy Trinity.

== Sport ==
- January 26 – Calgary's Bret Hart wins his first title when he became the third Canadian to win the World Wrestling Federation Tag Team Championship (with Jim Neidhart as the Hart Foundation) by defeating the British Bulldogs in Tampa, Florida, for the WWF's Superstars of Wrestling
- May 15 – The Medicine Hat Tigers win their first Memorial Cup by defeating the Oshawa Generals 6 to 2. The final game was played at Oshawa Civic Auditorium in Oshawa, Ontario
- May 31 – The Edmonton Oilers win their third Stanley Cup by defeating the Philadelphia Flyers 4 games to 3. The deciding Game 7 was played at Northlands Coliseum in Edmonton. Brandon, Manitoba's Ron Hextall was awarded the Conn Smythe Trophy in a losing effort.
- June 24 – The "new" Montreal Allouettes cease operations
- August 30 – Canadian sprinter Ben Johnson sets a new world record in the 100-metre dash.
- November 21 – The McGill Redmen win their first Vanier Cup by defeating the UBC Thunderbirds by a score of 47–11 in the 23rd Vanier Cup
- November 29 – The Edmonton Eskimos win their tenth Grey Cup by defeating the Toronto Argonauts 38 to 36 in the 75th Grey Cup played at BC Place Stadium in Vancouver

== Births ==
- January 1
  - Gilbert Brulé, ice hockey player
  - Devin Setoguchi, ice hockey player
- January 15
  - Kelleigh Ryan, fencer
  - Michael Seater, actor, director, producer, and screenwriter
- January 16 – Jake Epstein, actor
- January 19 – Alexandra Orlando, rhythmic gymnast
- January 21 – Andrew Forde, engineering graduate student and musician
- February 12 – Anna Hopkins, actress
- February 21 – Elliot Page, actor
- February 25
  - Andrew Poje, figure skater
  - Eva Avila, singer
- March 31 – Winston Venable, American football player
- April 1 – Mackenzie Davis, actress
- April 4 – Sarah Gadon, actress
- April 9 – Felix Cartal, DJ and producer
- April 10 – Shay Mitchell, actress, model, entrepreneur, and author
- April 11 – Lights (Valerie Poxleitner), singer and songwriter
- April 27
  - Joëlle Békhazi, water polo player
  - Alexandra Carter, voice actress
  - Emma Taylor-Isherwood, actress
- April 30 – Jeremy Bordeleau, canoeist
- May 1 – Marissa Ponich, fencer
- May 16 – Kylie Stone, artistic gymnast
- May 17 – Con Kudaba, water polo player
- May 29 – Noah Reid, actor and musician
- June 18 – Niels Schneider, French-Canadian actor
- June 22 – Melanie Banville, artistic gymnast
- July 7
  - Mylène Mackay, actress
  - Steven Crowder, American-Canadian political youtuber
- July 26 – Miriam McDonald, actress
- August 7 – Sidney Crosby, ice hockey player
- August 8 – Jenn Proske, actress
- August 16 – Carey Price, ice hockey goaltender
- August 25
  - Stacey Farber, actress
  - La zarra, singer
- September 2
  - Mazin Elsadig, American-Canadian actor
  - Scott Moir, ice dancer
- September 13 – G.NA, singer
- September 16 – Christina Schmidt, actress and model
- September 23 – Shannon Chan-Kent, actress and voice actress
- September 29 – Kyle Riabko, pop singer and guitarist
- October 6 – Kia Byers, canoeist
- October 15
  - Jesse Levine, Canadian-American tennis player
  - Chantal Strand, actress and voice actress
- October 16 – Pascal Wollach, swimmer
- October 29 – Jessica Dubé, figure skater
- November 12 – Bryan Little, ice hockey player
- November 15 – Ludi Lin, Chinese-Canadian actor
- December 12 – Kate Todd, actress and singer-songwriter

== Deaths ==
=== January to June ===
- January 5 – Margaret Laurence, novelist and short story writer (b.1926)
- January 5 – Herman Smith-Johannsen, ski pioneer and supercentenarian (b.1875)
- January 27 – Norman McLaren, animator and film director (b.1914)
- February 19 – Russell Doern, politician (b.1935)
- March 21 – Walter L. Gordon, accountant, businessman, politician and writer (b.1906)

=== July to December ===
- September 11 – Lorne Greene, actor (b.1915)
- September 19 – Ralph Steinhauer, native leader, first Aboriginal to become the Lieutenant Governor of Alberta (b.1905)
- October 5 – Conrad Bourcier, ice hockey player (b.1915)
- October 13 – Hugh Alexander Bryson, politician (b.1912)
- October 15 – Juda Hirsch Quastel, biochemist (b.1899)
- November 1 – René Lévesque, politician, Minister and 23rd Premier of Quebec (b.1922)
- November 6 – George Laurence, nuclear physicist (b.1905)
- November 18 – George Ryga, playwright and novelist (b.1932)
- November 29 – Gwendolyn MacEwen, novelist and poet (b.1941)

== See also ==
- 1987 in Canadian television
- List of Canadian films of 1987
