= 1930 in Canada =

- Decades: 1910s; 1920s; 1930s; 1940s; 1950s
- See also: History of Canada; Timeline of Canadian history; List of years in Canada

Events from the year 1930 in Canada.

== Incumbents ==
=== Crown ===
- Monarch – George V

=== Federal government ===
- Governor General – Freeman Freeman-Thomas, 1st Marquess of Willingdon
- Prime Minister – William Lyon Mackenzie King (until August 7) then Richard B. Bennett
- Chief Justice – Francis Alexander Anglin (Ontario)
- Parliament – 16th (until 30 May) then 17th (from 8 September)

=== Provincial governments ===
==== Lieutenant governors ====
- Lieutenant Governor of Alberta – William Egbert
- Lieutenant Governor of British Columbia – Robert Randolph Bruce
- Lieutenant Governor of Manitoba – James Duncan McGregor
- Lieutenant Governor of New Brunswick – Hugh Havelock McLean
- Lieutenant Governor of Nova Scotia – James Cranswick Tory (until November 19) then Frank Stanfield
- Lieutenant Governor of Ontario – William Donald Ross
- Lieutenant Governor of Prince Edward Island – Frank Richard Heartz (until November 19) then Charles Dalton
- Lieutenant Governor of Quebec – Henry George Carroll
- Lieutenant Governor of Saskatchewan – Henry William Newlands

==== Premiers ====
- Premier of Alberta – John Edward Brownlee
- Premier of British Columbia – Simon Fraser Tolmie
- Premier of Manitoba – John Bracken
- Premier of New Brunswick – John Baxter
- Premier of Nova Scotia – Edgar Nelson Rhodes (until August 11) then Gordon Sidney Harrington
- Premier of Ontario – George Howard Ferguson (until December 15) then George Stewart Henry
- Premier of Prince Edward Island – Albert Charles Saunders (until May 20) then Walter Lea
- Premier of Quebec – Louis-Alexandre Taschereau
- Premier of Saskatchewan – James Thomas Milton Anderson

=== Territorial governments ===
==== Commissioners ====
- Gold Commissioner of Yukon – George Ian MacLean
- Commissioner of Northwest Territories – William Wallace Cory

== Events ==
- February 15 – Cairine Wilson becomes Canada's first female senator
- May 20 – Walter Lea becomes Premier of Prince Edward Island, replacing Albert Saunders
- June 19 – 1930 Alberta general election: Premier John Brownlee's United Farmers of Alberta win a third consecutive majority
- June 22 – Statue of Jean Vauquelin unveiled in Montreal's Vauquelin Square
- June 29 – Eight Jesuit martyrs become the first Canadian saints
- July 1 – The Seigniory Club, later to become the Château Montebello hotel, opens in Montebello, Quebec
- June 26 – John B. King Explosion
- July 28 – Federal election: R.B. Bennett's Conservatives win a majority, defeating Mackenzie King's Liberals
- August 7 – R.B. Bennett becomes Prime Minister, replacing Mackenzie King
- August 11 – Gordon Harrington becomes Premier of Nova Scotia, replacing Edgar Rhodes
- October 18 – Robert Burns Memorial (Montreal) unveiled
- November 12 – Norway relinquishes its claim to the Sverdrup Islands.
- December 15 – George Henry becomes Premier of Ontario, replacing Howard Ferguson

== Arts and literature ==
- January 6 – An early literary character licensing agreement is signed by A. A. Milne, granting Stephen Slesinger U.S. and Canadian merchandising rights to the Winnie-the-Pooh works.

== Sport ==
- March 29 – The South Saskatchewan Junior Hockey League's Regina Pats win their third Memorial Cup by defeating the Ontario Hockey Association's West Toronto Nationals 2 games to 0. All games were played at Shea's Amphitheatre in Winnipeg
- April 3 – The Montreal Canadiens win their third Stanley Cup by defeating the Boston Bruins 2 games to 0. The deciding game was played at the Montreal Forum
- May 14 – Winnipeg Rugby Club (Winnipeg Blue Bombers) are established
- August 16–23 – The British Empire Games take place in Hamilton.
- December 6 – The Toronto Balmy Beach Beachers win their second Grey Cup, defeating the Regina Roughriders 11 to 6 in the 18th Grey Cup, played at Varsity Stadium

== Births ==
=== January to March ===
- January 4 – Herbert O. Sparrow, politician (d. 2012)
- January 7 – Clement Bowman, chemical engineer (d. 2021)
- January 11 – Harold Greenberg, film producer (d. 1996)
- January 12 – Tim Horton, ice hockey player and businessman (d. 1974)
- January 14 – Kenny Wheeler, composer and trumpet and flugelhorn player
- January 23 – Georges Massicotte, politician (d. 2020)
- January 24 – Felix Cappella, race walker (d. 2011)
- February 6 – Allan King, film director (d. 2009)
- February 12 – Daniel Hyatt, actor (d. 2015)
- March 11 – Claude Jutra, actor, film director and writer (d. 1986)
- March 13 – Sue Johanson, Canadian sex educator and TV personality (d. 2023)

=== April to June ===
- April 2 – Don Hall, ice hockey player (d. 2017)
- April 24 – Étienne Gaboury, architect (d. 2022)
- April 28 – Charles Caccia, politician (d. 2008)
- April 29 – Ben Hanuschak, politician
- April 30 – Jackie McLeod, ice hockey player and coach (d. 2022)
- May 9 – Muriel Smith, politician
- May 24 – Robert Bateman, naturalist and painter
- May 26 – Lorne Ferguson, ice hockey player (d. 2008)
- May 29 -
  - Roy Bonisteel, journalist and television host
  - Lawrence Heisey, businessman

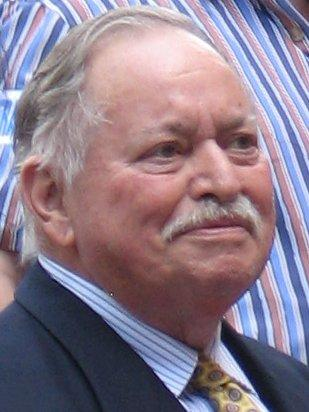
Jacques Parizeau

- June 17 – Rosemary Brown, politician (d. 2003)
- June 19 – John Lynch-Staunton, Senator

=== July to December ===
- July 6 – George Armstrong, ice hockey player (d. 2021)
- July 10 – Bruce Boa, actor (d. 2004)
- July 12 – Gordon Pinsent, actor (d. 2023)
- July 14 – Arthur Irving, businessman (d. 2024)
- July 15 – Richard Garneau, sports journalist (d. 2013)

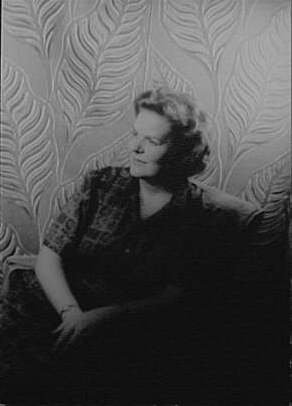
Maureen Forrester photo taken by Carl Van Vechten

- July 22 – Dinny Flanagan, ice hockey player (d. 2018)
- July 25 – Maureen Forrester, opera singer (d. 2010)
- August 9
  - Jacques Parizeau, economist, politician and 26th Premier of Quebec
  - Larry Regan, ice hockey player, coach and manager (d.2009)
- September 18 – John Tolos, wrestler and wrestling manager (d.2009)
- September 21 – John Morgan, comedian (d.2004)
- October 2 – Dave Barrett, politician and 26th Premier of British Columbia
- October 24 – Micheline Beauchemin, textile artist and weaver
- October 29 – André Bernier, politician
- October 30 – Timothy Findley, novelist and playwright (d.2002)
- December 1 – Jim Anderson, ice hockey player (Springfield Indians) and coach (Washington Capitals) (d.2013)

=== Full date unknown ===
- Ben Kerr, street performer, author, broadcaster, musician and perennial candidate (d.2005)

== Deaths ==
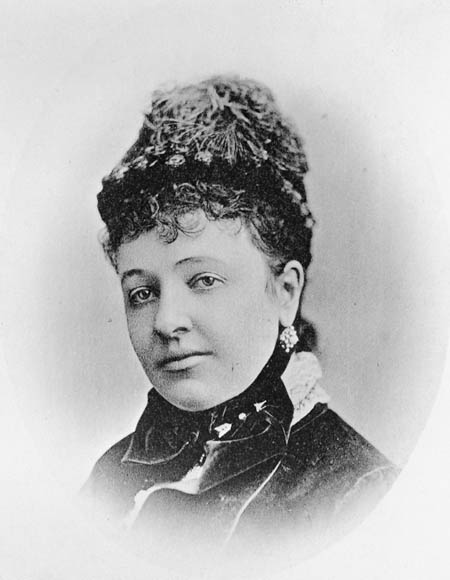
Emma Albani

- February – Levi Addison Ault, businessman and naturalist (b. 1851)
- February 28 – George Boyce, politician (b. 1848)
- April 3 – Emma Albani, soprano (b. 1847)
- June 19 – John Mackenzie Moore, Canadian architect (b. 1857)
- July 19 – David Bonis, politician
- August 3 – James Alexander Anderson, politician
- November 16 – William James Topley, photographer (b. 1845)
- December 9 – Laura Muntz Lyall, painter (b. 1860)
- November 21 – Jean-Marie-Raphaël Le Jeune, Canadian writer, linguist and Catholic priest (b. 1855)
