= John Bazalgette =

Canadian politician

Colonel John Bazalgette (15 December 1784 – 28 March 1868) was an army officer actively involved in the affairs of Nova Scotia for forty-three years. He was born in London, the second son of Jean Louis Bazalgette (1750–1830), a French immigrant born in Ispagnac, in the Lozère department in southern France, and Catherine, née Metivier (c.1762-1785), also from a French family in London. His nephew was the prominent Victorian civil engineer, Sir Joseph William Bazalgette (1819–1891)

Bazalgette had previously served with the British Army in other colonial posts before arriving in Nova Scotia in 1811. A lieutenant in the 80th Foot, he was promoted captain in the 99th Foot (later renumbered 98th Foot) without purchase in 1805. By 1830 he was a major in the 98th Foot. In 1837 he was promoted lieutenant-colonel in the Army. He was made administrator of the provincial government for Lieutenant-Governor Sir John Harvey from 30 May to 30 September 1851 and from 22 March to 5 August 1852. This period included the debate on Joseph Howe's railway policy. It appears from correspondence with the Colonial Office that he had a good sense of balance between colonial needs and his responsibility to England.

While stationed in Bermuda, he married Sarah Crawford Magdalen Van Norden (1794–1866), and the marriage produced 15 children: 6 girls and 9 boys, of whom seven in turn went into the Army.

By 1854 he was a colonel and Deputy Quartermaster-General of Nova Scotia. In that year he purchased the lieutenant-colonelcy of the 2nd West India Regiment. He returned to England the same year and retired in 1858. His long tenure in Canada shows an unusual loyalty to a colonial posting by a British officer of that time.
