= Harry Kermode =

Canadian basketball player

Harold Douglas Kermode
Personal information
- Birth name: Harold Douglas Kermode
- Born: 18 July 1922; Nanaimo, British Columbia, Canada
- Died: 19 August 2009 (aged 87); Vancouver, Canada

Sport
- Sport: Basketball

Harold Douglas Kermode (18 July 1922 – 19 August 2009) was a Canadian basketball player. He competed in the men's tournament at the 1948 Summer Olympics.

== Personal life ==
Kermode served in the Royal Canadian Air Force during the Second World War.
