= Amherst (automobile) =

The Amherst was a Canadian automobile manufactured in Amherstburg in 1911. A distinctive feature of the car was a demountable body that could be fitted behind the front seats to convert the car into a light truck.

The car was financed by backers in Detroit, Michigan, but they withdrew their support before production commenced. Only three cars were built before the company failed.
