= William Abrams =

William Abrams (c. 1785 – 6 February 1844) was a businessman with a military and judicial career in New Brunswick.

Abrams was born in Plymouth, England and was in businesses in Greenock, Scotland before emigrating to New Brunswick in 1819. There, he started a business funded by himself and five partners in Scotland. He and his family settled in the Miramichi region and he ran a business there, first with partners and later on his own, until his death.

In Rosebank, Abrams founded a shipyard, which suffered in the Miramichi Fire of 1825. Total losses were approximately £40,000. Trans-Atlantic trade was rising, however, and the company financially recovered. In total, the shipyard built 25 sailing vessels.

In 1838, the Miramichi Abrams shipyard built the Actaeon, which sailed to Liverpool and registered there in the year of its construction. The ship, a three-masted barque, was scuttled in 1853 in the Falkland Islands.

== Community involvement ==
Abrams was active in the community and served as a justice of the peace and a justice of the Inferior Court of Common Pleas in New Brunswick. Additionally, he served as an Anglican vestryman, militia battalion captain, agricultural society treasurer, school trustee, hospital commissioner, Northumberland County Board of Health member, and Miramichi Port harbormaster. In 1827, he ran for a Northumberland County seats in the House of Assembly but was defeated.

He also brought needed banking services to the area and promoted the foundation of the local Chamber of Commerce. He was a prominent early shipbuilder in New Brunswick and, as such, contributed to the developing economy of the time.

== Personal life ==
Abrams married Sarah Trigholon in 1807, and they had ten children, two sons and eight daughters. Two of his children died in the Miramichi Fire. Abrams belonged to the Church of England. He died 6 February 1844 in Newcastle, New Brunswick. Portraits of Sarah and William Abrams, painted by Boston artist Albert Gallatin Hoit, are owned by the New Brunswick Museum.
