= ElderTreks =

Travel Company

- Type: Tour Operator
- Industry: Travel
- Founded: 1987
- Founder: Gary Murtagh
- Headquarters: Toronto, Canada
- Owner: Gary Murtagh
- Website: www.eldertreks.com

ElderTreks is a Canadian adventure travel company for people over the age of 50.

== History ==
ElderTreks was founded in 1987 by Tov Mason and Gary Murtagh. Having travelled to more than 100 countries, Murtagh now operates tours to over 100 countries, and helps travelers who are 50 years and over. The organization supports charities and conservation groups around the world. Some of the popular tours include Iran, Cuba and Myanmar. Groups are no larger than 16 guests and focus on exploring nature, wildlife and culture.
