= George Wright (governor) =

Canadian politician

George Wright (December 29, 1779 – March 13, 1842) was a businessman, judge and political figure in Prince Edward Island. He served as colonial administrator for the colony in 1825, in 1834, from 1835 to 1836, in 1837 and in 1841.

He was born in Charlottetown, the son of Susanna Turner and Thomas Wright, who became in 1773 the first surveyor general of St. John's Island. Wright worked for his father for several years as deputy surveyor. On December 28, 1807 he married Phebe Cambridge, the daughter of merchant John Cambridge. In the following year, he went into business with his father-in-law and a brother-in-law. From 1810 to 1811, he served as high sheriff. In 1813, when the partnership dissolved, he became owner of a brewery and mills near Charlottetown. Wright served in the militia during the War of 1812, reaching the rank of lieutenant-colonel. He was named to the province's Council in 1813. In 1828, he was named assistant judge in the province's Supreme Court and also became surveyor general. Wright helped establish the Central Agricultural Society and served as its president. He died in Charlottetown at the age of 62.

His son George also served as surveyor general for Prince Edward Island.
