= 1915 in Canada =

- Decades: 1890s; 1900s; 1910s; 1920s; 1930s
- See also: History of Canada; Timeline of Canadian history; List of years in Canada

Events from the year 1915 in Canada.

== Incumbents ==
=== Crown ===
- Monarch – George V

=== Federal government ===
- Governor General – Prince Arthur, Duke of Connaught and Strathearn
- Prime Minister – Robert Borden
- Chief Justice – Charles Fitzpatrick (Quebec)
- Parliament – 12th

=== Provincial governments ===
==== Lieutenant governors ====
- Lieutenant Governor of Alberta – George H. V. Bulyea (until October 20) then Robert Brett
- Lieutenant Governor of British Columbia – Francis Stillman Barnard
- Lieutenant Governor of Manitoba – Douglas Colin Cameron
- Lieutenant Governor of New Brunswick – Josiah Wood
- Lieutenant Governor of Nova Scotia – James Drummond McGregor (until October 19) then David MacKeen
- Lieutenant Governor of Ontario – John Strathearn Hendrie
- Lieutenant Governor of Prince Edward Island – Benjamin Rogers (until June 3) then Augustine Colin Macdonald
- Lieutenant Governor of Quebec – François Langelier (until February 8) then Pierre-Évariste Leblanc
- Lieutenant Governor of Saskatchewan – George W. Brown (until October 6) then Richard Stuart Lake

==== Premiers ====
- Premier of Alberta – Arthur Sifton
- Premier of British Columbia – Richard McBride (until December 15) then William John Bowser
- Premier of Manitoba – Rodmond Roblin (until May 12) then Tobias Norris
- Premier of New Brunswick – George Johnson Clarke
- Premier of Nova Scotia – George Henry Murray
- Premier of Ontario – William Hearst
- Premier of Prince Edward Island – John Alexander Mathieson
- Premier of Quebec – Lomer Gouin
- Premier of Saskatchewan – Thomas Walter Scott

=== Territorial governments ===
==== Commissioners ====
- Commissioner of Yukon – George Black
- Gold Commissioner of Yukon – George P. MacKenzie
- Commissioner of Northwest Territories – Frederick D. White

== Events ==
- January 4 – WWI: Princess Patricia's Canadian Light Infantry becomes the first Canadian troops sent to the front lines
- January 15 – The Canadian Northern Railway line to Vancouver, British Columbia, is completed
- February 2 – WW1: Attempt to bomb the Vanceboro international bridge between the Canadian-US border by a German spy
- February 4 – WW1: After a training accident, Lieutenant W. F. Sharpe becomes the first Canadian military airman killed
- February 14 – WW1: The 1st Canadian Division arrives in France
- February 21 – Nellie McClung presents a petition to the Alberta Legislature demanding women's suffrage
- February 28 – WWI: Canadian troops launch the first trench raid of the war; by the end of the conflict Canadian troops will be regarded as the experts at this manoeuvre
- March 26 – The Vancouver Millionaires win the Stanley Cup in ice hockey over the Ottawa Senators, 3 games to 0.
- April 22 – WWI: In the Second Battle of Ypres Canadian forces bear the brunt of the first large-scale chemical weapons attack on the Western Front. They devise makeshift gas masks of urine-soaked rags and hold their ground
- May 3 – "In Flanders Fields" is written by Canadian poet John McCrae.
- May 12 – Tobias Norris becomes premier of Manitoba, replacing Sir Rodmond Roblin
- July 5 – The Hotel Macdonald in Edmonton opens
- August 6 – Manitoba General Election
- September 13 – WWI: with the arrival of the 2nd Canadian Division a separate Canadian Corps is created
- October 9 – WWI: The 3rd Canadian Division arrives in France
- December 15 – William John Bowser becomes premier of British Columbia, replacing Richard McBride
- December 19 – WW1: Captain M.M. Bell-Irving, No.1 Squadron, Royal Flying Corps, achieves the first aerial victory by a Canadian when he shot down a German aircraft

=== Full date unknown ===
- Fermière Monument (Montreal) unveiled
- World War I – Many Canadian soldiers grow upset at the inferior quality of their Ross Rifles

== Arts and literature ==
=== New works ===
- "In Flanders Fields": John McCrae
- The Golden Road: Lucy Maud Montgomery

== Sport ==
- March 26 – The Pacific Coast Hockey Association's Vancouver Millionaires win their first and only Stanley Cup by defeating the National Hockey Association's Ottawa Senators 3 games to 0. All games played at Vancouver's Denman Arena
- November 20 – The Hamilton Tigers win their 2nd Grey Cup by defeating the Toronto Rugby and Athletic Association 13 to 7 in the 7th Grey Cup played at Toronto's Varsity Stadium

== Births ==
=== January to June ===
- January 7 – Helen Mussallem, nursing administrator (d.2012)
- January 12 – Joseph-Aurèle Plourde, Roman Catholic prelate, Archbishop of Ottawa (1967–1989) (d.2013)
- January 18 – Syl Apps, pole vaulter and ice hockey player (d.1998)
- February 12 – Lorne Greene, actor (d.1987)
- March 10 – Maurice Camyré, Olympic boxer (d.2013)
- March 18 – Harold Crowchild, Tsuu T'ina elder and soldier, last Treaty 7 World War II veteran (d.2013)
- April 9 – Daniel Johnson, Sr., politician and 20th Premier of Quebec (d.1968)
- April 11 – Eddie Sargent, politician (d.1998)
- April 28 – Robina Higgins, track and field athlete (d.1990)
- May 3 – Stu Hart, wrestler, promoter and trainer (d.2003)
- May 28
  - Conrad Bourcier, ice hockey player (d.1987)
  - Frank Pickersgill, World War II hero (d.1944)
- June 22 – Arthur Gelber, philanthropist (d.1998)
- June 28 – Muzz Patrick, ice hockey player and coach (d.1998)

=== July to December ===
- July 4 – Harold E. Johns, medical physicist (d.1998)
- July 6 – Leonard Birchall, World War II hero (d.2004)
- August 3 – Frank Calder, politician, first Status Indian to be elected to any legislature in Canada (d.2006)
- August 14 – Vincent Foy, Roman Catholic cleric and theologian (d.2017)
- August 20 – H. Gordon Barrett, politician (d.1993)
- August 22
  - James Hillier, scientist and inventor, jointly designed and built first electron microscope (d.2007)
  - Jacques Flynn, politician and Senator (d.2000)
- August 25 – John W. H. Bassett, publisher and media baron (d.1998)
- October 7
  - Harry J. Boyle, broadcaster and writer (d.2005)
  - Charles Templeton, cartoonist, evangelist, agnostic, politician, newspaper editor, inventor, broadcaster and author (d.2001)
- October 25 – Tommy Prince, one of Canada's most decorated First Nations soldiers (d.1977)
- November 27 – Yves Thériault, author (d.1983)
- December 4 – Johnny Lombardi, CHIN-TV television personality (d.2002)
- December 13 – Ross Macdonald, novelist (d.1983)

=== Full date unknown ===
- Arthur Julian Andrew, diplomat and author (d.1994)
- Earl Cameron, broadcaster and news anchor (d.2005)
- Percy Saltzman, meteorologist and television personality, first weatherman in English-Canadian television history (d.2007)

== Deaths ==
- January 18 – Thomas Bain, politician and Speaker of the House of Commons of Canada (b. 1834)

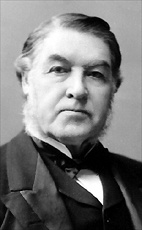
Charles Tupper

- May 16 – Kit Coleman, journalist (b. 1864)
- June 14 – Antoine Audet, politician (b. 1846)
- July 21 – Jean Prévost, politician (b. 1870)
- July 22 – Sandford Fleming, engineer and inventor (b. 1827)
- August 10 – William Mortimer Clark, lawyer, politician and Lieutenant Governor of Ontario (b. 1836)
- September 10 – Charles Boucher de Boucherville, politician and 3rd Premier of Quebec (b. 1822)
- September 11 – William Cornelius Van Horne, pioneering railway executive (b. 1843)
- September 15 – Ernest Gagnon, folklorist (b. 1834)
- October 19 – Neil McLeod, lawyer, judge, politician and Premier of Prince Edward Island (b. 1842)
- October 30 – Charles Tupper, politician, Premier of Nova Scotia and 6th Prime Minister of Canada (b. 1821)
- December 25 – Graham Fraser (industrialist) (b. 1845)

== See also ==
- List of Canadian films
