= Walter Cameron Nichol =

Canadian journalist (1866–1928)

The Honourable Walter Cameron Nichol
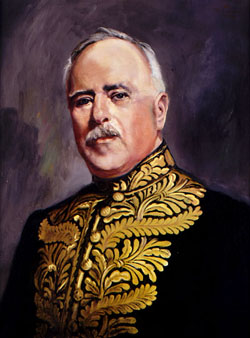

12th Lieutenant Governor of British Columbia
- In office December 24, 1920 – January 21, 1926
- Monarch: George V
- Governors General: The Duke of Devonshire; The Lord Byng of Vimy
- Premier: John Oliver
- Preceded by: Edward Gawler Prior
- Succeeded by: Robert Randolph Bruce

Personal details
- Born: October 15, 1866 Goderich, Canada West
- Died: December 19, 1928 (aged 62) Victoria, British Columbia, Canada
- Spouse: Quita Josephine March Moore (m. 1897)
- Relations: Robert Nichol, grandfather
- Children: 2
- Occupation: journalist, newspaper editor and publisher
- Profession: Politician

Walter Cameron Nichol (October 15, 1866 – December 19, 1928) was a Canadian journalist, newspaper editor and publisher, and the 12th Lieutenant Governor of British Columbia.
