= John Harvey (British Army officer) =

British officer (1778–1852)

Lieutenant-General Sir John Harvey KCB KCH
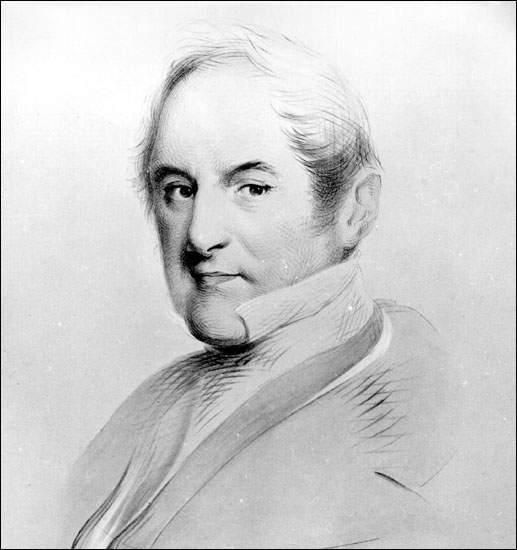

Personal details
- Born: April 23, 1778
- Died: March 22, 1852 (aged 73)

Military service
- Branch/service: 80th Regiment of Foot (Staffordshire Volunteers)
- Rank: Lieutenant-General
- Battles/wars: Battle of Stoney Creek; Battle of Crysler's Farm

Viceregal styles of Sir John Harvey
- Reference style: His Excellency
- Spoken style: Your Excellency

Lieutenant-General Sir John Harvey KCB KCH (b. 1778 – d. 1852) was a British Army officer and a lieutenant governor.

He was commissioned into the 80th Foot in 1794 and served in several locations, including France, Egypt, and India. He moved to Canada in 1813 and served as a lieutenant colonel in the War of 1812, taking part in the British victories at the Battle of Stoney Creek and the Battle of Crysler's Farm in Ontario.

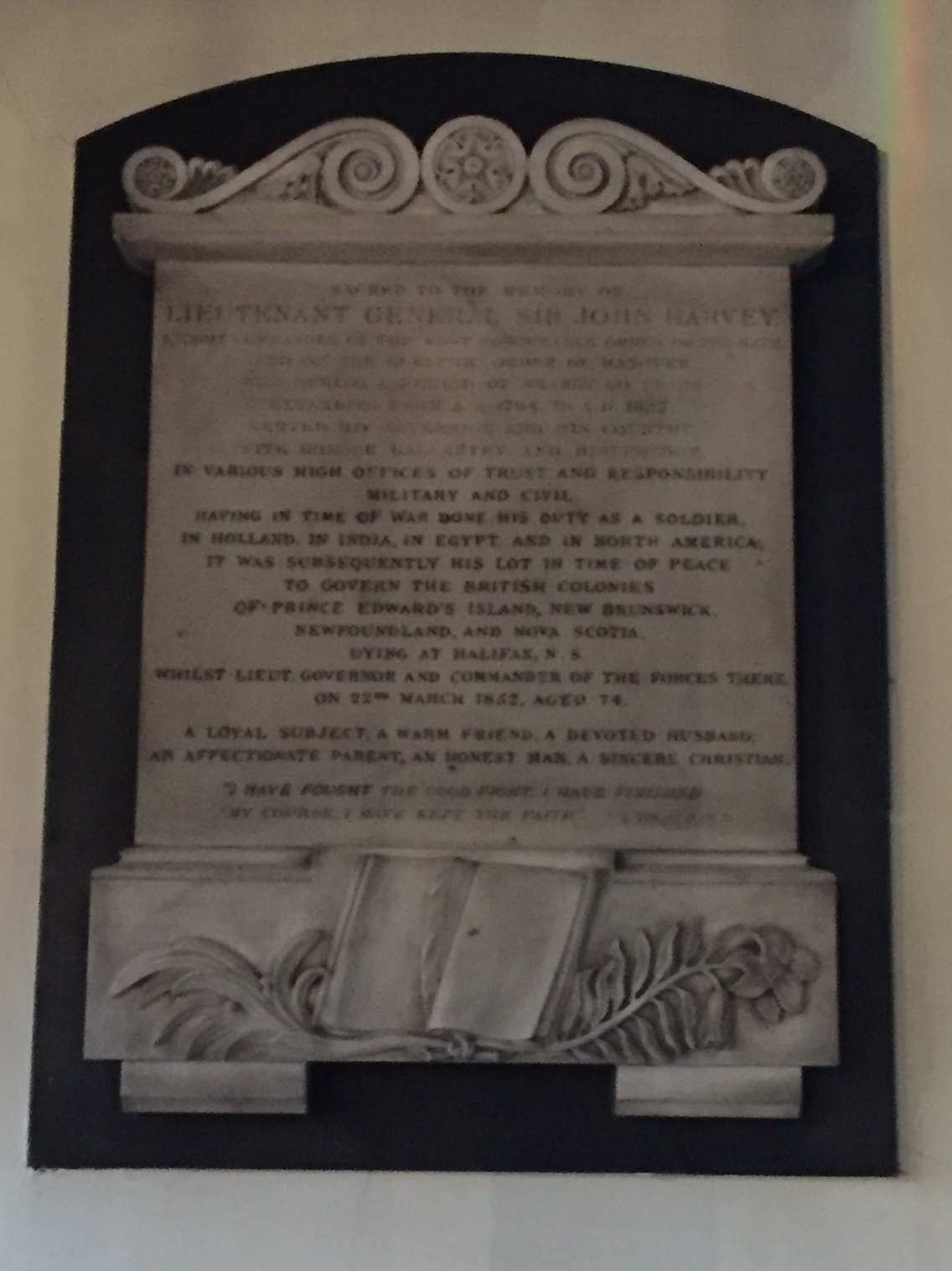
Sir John Harvey, St. Paul's Church, Halifax, Nova Scotia, Canada

From 1836 to 1837, he was the Lieutenant Governor of Prince Edward Island. From 1837 to 1841, he was the Lieutenant Governor of New Brunswick. From 1841 to 1846, he was the Civil Governor of Newfoundland. From 1846 to 1852, he was the Lieutenant Governor of Nova Scotia.

== Legacy ==
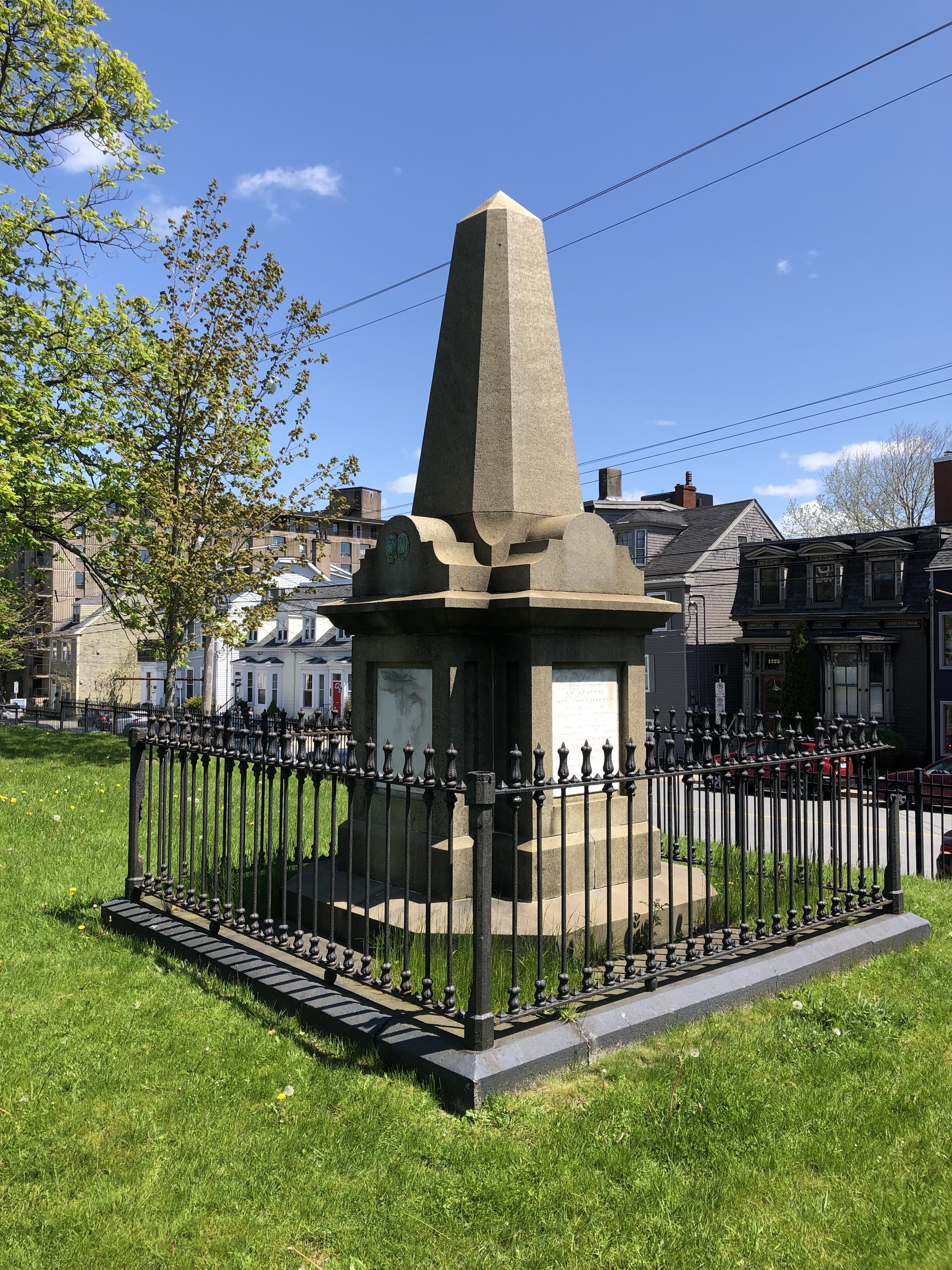
Sir John Harvey, Fort Massey Cemetery, Halifax, Nova Scotia

Harvey, York County, New Brunswick, founded in 1837 when he was Lieutenant-Governor of New Brunswick, is named for him.

Harvey Park in Hamilton, Ontario, is named after him.

Former Harvey Township (now amalgamated with Galway-Cavendish and Harvey Township), Peterborough County, Ontario, is named after him.

There is a monument to him in St. Paul's Church (Halifax). He is buried in Fort Massey Cemetery.

Amelia Clotilda Jennings wrote a poem for him upon his death.

== See also ==
- List of lieutenant governors of Nova Scotia
- Governors of Newfoundland
- List of people of Newfoundland and Labrador

Military offices
Preceded by Sir Robert Lawrence Dundas	Colonel of the 59th (2nd Nottinghamshire) Regiment of Foot; 1844–1852	Succeeded by George Augustus Henderson
Political offices
Preceded by George Wright	Lieutenant-Governor of Prince Edward Island; 1836–1837	Succeeded by Sir Charles Augustus FitzRoy
Preceded by Sir Archibald Campbell	Lieutenant-Governor of New Brunswick; 1837–1841	Succeeded by Sir William MacBean George Colebrooke
Preceded by Sir Henry Prescott	Governor of Newfoundland; 1841–1846	Succeeded by Sir John Le Marchant
Note: The year after Sir John Harvey had stepped down as governor of Newfoundland and when Sir John Le Marchant was appointed, the colony was administered by Robert Law, a British Army officer.
Preceded by Sir Jeremiah Dickson (acting)	Lieutenant-Governor of Nova Scotia; 1846–1848	The political nature of the office transferred to the Premier of Nova Scotia.
Government offices
New office Now a mostly ceremonial office.	Lieutenant-Governor of Nova Scotia; 1848–1852	Succeeded by John Bazalgette
