= George P. MacKenzie =

Yukon educator and politician

George Patten MacKenzie (1873–1954) was an educator and politician in the Yukon. He served as the gold commissioner from 1912 to 1924.

He was born in Malagash, Nova Scotia and moved to the Yukon during the Klondike Gold Rush. MacKenzie founded the first high school in the Yukon and served as its principal. He later served as supervisor for all schools in the Yukon. MacKenzie began work in the gold commissioner's office in 1904; in 1912, he became the gold commissioner and served in that position until 1924. In 1918, the positions of commissioner and administrator of the Yukon Territory were abolished and their responsibilities were assigned to the gold commissioner, who became the chief executive officer of the Yukon Territory. In 1924, he became commander of Eastern Arctic explorations for the Canadian government and supervised expeditions to the Arctic. MacKenzie retired from that position in 1931.

He died in Ottawa, Ontario on June 10, 1954, and was buried in Beechwood Cemetery.
