= 2004 in Canada =

- Decades: 1980s; 1990s; 2000s; 2010s; 2020s
- See also: History of Canada; Timeline of Canadian history; List of years in Canada

Events from the year 2004 in Canada.

== Incumbents ==
=== Crown ===
- Monarch – Elizabeth II

=== Federal government ===
- Governor General – Adrienne Clarkson
- Prime Minister – Paul Martin
- Chief Justice – Beverley McLachlin (British Columbia)
- Parliament – 37th (until 23 May) then 38th (from October 4)

=== Provincial governments ===
==== Lieutenant governors ====
- Lieutenant Governor of Alberta – Lois Hole
- Lieutenant Governor of British Columbia – Iona Campagnolo
- Lieutenant Governor of Manitoba – Peter Liba (until June 30) then John Harvard
- Lieutenant Governor of New Brunswick – Herménégilde Chiasson
- Lieutenant Governor of Newfoundland and Labrador – Edward Roberts
- Lieutenant Governor of Nova Scotia – Myra Freeman
- Lieutenant Governor of Ontario – James Bartleman
- Lieutenant Governor of Prince Edward Island – Léonce Bernard
- Lieutenant Governor of Quebec – Lise Thibault
- Lieutenant Governor of Saskatchewan – Lynda Haverstock

==== Premiers ====
- Premier of Alberta – Ralph Klein
- Premier of British Columbia – Gordon Campbell
- Premier of Manitoba – Gary Doer
- Premier of New Brunswick – Bernard Lord
- Premier of Newfoundland and Labrador – Danny Williams
- Premier of Nova Scotia – John Hamm
- Premier of Ontario – Dalton McGuinty
- Premier of Prince Edward Island – Pat Binns
- Premier of Quebec – Jean Charest
- Premier of Saskatchewan – Lorne Calvert

=== Territorial governments ===
==== Commissioners ====
- Commissioner of Yukon – Jack Cable
- Commissioner of Northwest Territories – Glenna Hansen
- Commissioner of Nunavut – Peter Irniq

==== Premiers ====
- Premier of the Northwest Territories – Joe Handley
- Premier of Nunavut – Paul Okalik
- Premier of Yukon – Dennis Fentie

== Events ==
=== January ===
- January 1 – Montreal Dorval Airport is renamed, after some controversy, Montréal–Pierre Elliott Trudeau International Airport.
- January 5 – Canadian dollar value climbs above $0.78 US, for the first time since July 1993.
- January 12 – Stephen Harper enters leadership race for the new Conservative Party of Canada.
- January 13 – U.S. President George W. Bush allows Canada to bid for contracts in Iraq.
- January 16 – Race begins in 2004 Nunavut general election.
- January 19 – Government of Canada challenges Department of Justice against repayment of benefits to same-sex couples dating back to 1985.
- January 19 – The Sûreté du Québec announce a new police force to fight organized crime.
- January 22 – Montreal's Centre hospitalier universitaire Sainte-Justine warns of a former surgeon who may have infected 2,600 patients with HIV, by letter.
- January 27 – a Canadian soldier, Corporal Jamie Murphy, is killed in a suicide attack in Afghanistan. Three other soldiers are also injured.
- January 29 – North Atlantic Treaty Organization Secretary General Jaap de Hoop Scheffer requests Canadian soldiers to keep a presence in Afghanistan after the scheduled return of troops in August.
- January 30 – The Supreme Court of Canada upholds a law allowing parents to spank their children within "reasonable limits".

=== February ===
- February 2 – The Speech from the Throne is read by Governor General Adrienne Clarkson in the Senate chamber.
- February 6 – Canadian SPCA finds 100 dead cows and 100 more being improperly cared for, on an Alberta farm.
- February 6 – The Canadian Broadcasting Corporation announces it will use a broadcast delay during Don Cherry's Coaches Corner on Hockey Night in Canada, after he makes anti-French and European comments, a possible violation of the Official Languages Act of Canada.
- February 10 – Auditor General of Canada Sheila Fraser releases a study on the federal government's advertising and sponsorship in Quebec which notes millions of dollars were mishandled. (See: 2004 Canadian sponsorship scandal).
- February 12 – The World Health Organization endorses a Health Canada plan to deal with a potential influenza pandemic.
- February 12 – A Moose Jaw, Saskatchewan woman, now 18, who became a quadriplegic after being hit by a vehicle at age 4, is awarded $12 million in a lawsuit against the driver, the city and the former police chief. It is the largest lawsuit awarded in Saskatchewan history.
- February 13 – Jane Stewart, former Human Resources Development Canada Minister, announces her retirement from politics, to work for the United Nations International Labour Organization.
- February 16 – Conservative Party of Canada Member of Parliament Elsie Wayne announces her retirement from politics.
- February 16 – The Canadian Recording Industry Association ask a judge to order many Canadian Internet service providers to hand over names of 29 suspected illegal fileswappers.
- February 16 – Polling day, 2004 Nunavut general election. Of the 19 members of the consensus government, 1 is acclaimed and 18 elections are held. Eight members of the previous government are re-elected, five are defeated, and five who did not run again are replaced. MLAs will choose the premier from among themselves on March 5; incumbent Paul Okalik is challenged by Tagak Curley.
- February 17 – John Bryden, Liberal Party of Canada Member of Parliament for Ancaster—Dundas—Flamborough—Aldershot in the House of Commons of Canada, resigns from the party due to the Prime Minister of Canada's sponsorship scandal.
- February 17 – Canada donates $800,000 to the World Food Programme and $350,000 to the International Red Cross, to help with the current food and medical needs in Haiti, following the recent coup there.
- February 18 – Auditor General of New Brunswick Daryl Wilson reports Premier of New Brunswick Bernard Lord lied about the province having a budget surplus of $1,000,000. Lord accuses the Auditor General of "accounting semantics".
- February 19 – Jeremy Hinzman, a US soldier from the US 82nd Airborne Division in North Carolina, seeks refugee status in Canada as a conscientious objector to serving in Iraq. He currently lives in Toronto with his wife and child.
- February 19 – Starting in Buffalo, New York, and ending in Niagara Falls, Ontario, a cross-border police pursuit results in dead Canadian woman.
- February 20 – The Saskatchewan Minister of Justice, Frank Quennell, announces Alberta Justice Edward P. McCallum will head an inquiry into David Milgaard's wrongful conviction.
- February 20 – South Korea, Singapore, Japan and Hong Kong ban poultry and birds imports from Canada, after the virus H7 is found. It is not linked to H5N1 (virus), which was blamed for killing 22 people in Asia (See also: avian influenza).
- February 20 – Canada is part of multi-national delegation with the United States, France and Caribbean nations sent to Haiti, to help end the conflict.
- February 21 – A joint investigation into the February 19 cross-border police chase is made by Niagara Falls, New York Police, Niagara Falls, Ontario Police and Canada Customs and Revenue Agency, to determine if proper procedure was followed.
- February 23 – Microcell Solutions Inc. sues Telus Communications, Bell Mobility, Rogers Wireless and Société Tele-Mobile, in a Quebec superior court, for violating its trademark Fido dog image.
- February 23 – Toronto nurse Andrea Williams files a $600 million lawsuit against the governments of Canada and Ontario due to her contracting SARS, during the 2003 outbreak.
- February 24 – Prime Minister Paul Martin suspends three Crown corporation heads in steps dealing with the sponsorship scandal. Those suspended are Michel Vennat, president of the Business Development Bank of Canada, Via Rail president Marc LeFrançois and Canada Post president André Ouellet.
- February 25 – Vancouver International Airport (YVR) announces $1.4 million expansion.
- February 26 – Canadian Forces send nine members of elite counter-terrorism unit Joint Task Force 2 to Haiti to aid in evacuating Canadians.
- February 28 – Canadian businessman James Sabzali, living in Philadelphia since 1996, fined and sentenced to a year probation for violating the United States embargo against Cuba.
- February 28 – Royal Canadian Mounted Police Corporal Jim Galloway shot dead during a standoff.

=== March ===
- March 3 – United Nations International Narcotics Control Board criticizes Canada for having a provincially run safe house for drug users in Vancouver, British Columbia.
- March 3 – RCMP investigate threatening letters sent to Charlottetown, Prince Edward Island government and media buildings.
- March 3 – Former Jean Chrétien aide Jean Carle linked to 2004 Canadian sponsorship scandal.
- March 5 – Paul Okalik re-elected as Premier of Nunavut in 2004 Nunavut general election.
- March 5 – Canadian Forces plans to send 450 troops, including three infantry platoons and six helicopters from 430 Squadron in Valcartier, Quebec, and members of I Company 2nd Battalion The Royal Canadian Regiment, based at Canadian Forces Base Gagetown in New Brunswick, to Haiti for a 90-day mission.
- March 5 – Prime Minister Paul Martin fires the President of Via Rail, Marc LeFrançois.
- March 5 – Abdurahman Khadr, who admitted recently to having Al-Qaeda and Osama bin Laden links, alleges to working for the Central Intelligence Agency as an informant.
- March 6 – Sheila Copps loses nomination to Tony Valeri to represent the riding of Hamilton East—Stoney Creek in the 2004 federal election.
- March 7–8 – UN Secretary General Kofi Annan visits Canada to meet with Governor General of Canada Adrienne Clarkson, Prime Minister Martin, and Louise Arbour, who was recently named UN High Commissioner for Human Rights. Topic of discussion with the PM will be the Haiti crisis.
- March 9 – Sheila Copps files an appeal of the Liberal nomination loss and a complaint to the RCMP.
- March 9 – Belinda Stronach wins Conservative Party of Canada nomination for riding of Newmarket—Aurora, defeating Lois Brown 512-412 in total votes.
- March 9 – Second form of avian influenza found on British Columbia farm.
- March 9 – Ottawa police chief Vince Bevan admits involvement in investigating Maher Arar before he was deported to Syria.
- March 9 – Protests across the country against Citizenship and Immigration Canada for arrest of Algerian refugee Mohamed Cherfi by Quebec City police for failing to report an address change. He had been hiding in a church, which is normally considered a refugee safe house.
- March 9 – 2004 Canadian sponsorship scandal investigation finds $2.3 million missing which was to be used to fund the Bluenose 2.
- March 12 – Canadian Forces begin deployment to Haiti to support peacekeeping force.
- March 12 – CFB Gagetown, New Brunswick Colonel Barry McLeod named Chief of Staff of United Nations Mission in the Democratic Republic of the Congo (MONUC). He will arrive there in July.
- March 12 – 2004 Canadian sponsorship scandal investigation results in firing of Michel Vennat, the Business Development Bank of Canada's President.
- March 15 – Treasury Board of Canada President Reg Alcock announces a "merit-based" system to appoint new CEOs for Crown corporations.
- March 15 – Quebec government warns 1,144 people who attended an acupuncture clinic (owned by Suzanne Sicotte) in Montreal to take blood tests for HIV and hepatitis.
- March 15 – Brad Wall appointed leader of the Saskatchewan Party.
- March 16 – Equifax confirms security breach resulting in the illegal access to files containing credit information of 1,400 Canadians.
- March 17 – House of Commons committee summons 11 federal bureaucrats in investigation of the sponsorship scandal for a private hearing, later to become a public hearing.
- March 17 – Canadian Food Inspection Agency creates a programme for routine testing of poultry for avian influenza (bird flu), after British Columbia had to destroy 57,000 chickens.
- March 17 – Fisheries Minister Geoff Regan announces increased patrols outside the 320-kilometre limit off Canada's east coast.
- March 17 – A stamp is created in honour of former Governor General of Canada Ray Hnatyshyn.
- March 17 – 170 Canadian Forces soldiers sent to Haiti to provide security (See Operation Halo).
- March 18 – Kickbacks discovered in free flag giveaway discovered from 1996 promise by Sheila Copps to give away one million free flags.
- March 20 – In the 2004 Conservative Party of Canada leadership election, Stephen Harper wins on the first ballot to become leader of the party and the official opposition.
- March 22 – Federal government announces an aid package worth almost $1 billion to farmers hurt by mad cow disease.
- March 22 – Conservative Party of Canada leader Stephen Harper appointed Peter MacKay as Deputy Leader.
- March 22 – Supreme Court of Canada jurist Frank Iacobucci announces his retirement effective June.
- March 22 – Canada condemns Israel's assassination of Hamas founder Shaikh Ahmed Yassin.
- March 22 – Canada introduces a bill to protect public service worker whistleblowers.
- March 23 – The 2004 Canadian budget is announced.
- March 23 – The government of Canada will sell its stake in Petro-Canada within next twelve months.
- March 24 – RCMP release documents detailing investigation of newspaper reporter Juliet O'Neill telling how they searched for details of her knowledge of the Maher Arar case. A January 2004 raid of her house was also documented.
- March 24 – Canadian Food Inspection Agency orders slaughter of 275,000 chickens and turkeys in British Columbia to fight avian influenza outbreak.
- March 24 – Myriam Bédard testifies to a committee investigating the sponsorship scandal that she heard Jacques Villeneuve was paid millions of dollars to wear a Canadian flag on his racing suit; Villeneuve calls this allegation "ludicrous".
- March 25 – Supreme Court of Canada rules 9–0 in not holding Catholic Church of Canada responsible for sexual abuse of altar boys by a Newfoundland priest Kevin Bennett.
- March 26 – Supreme Court of Canada upholds legitimacy of pre-nuptial agreements saying it cannot be considered unfair at the time of signing.
- March 26 – Minister of Foreign Affairs Bill Graham speaks at a memorial conference at the United Nations for the 1994 Rwanda massacre, reminding people to not forget the genocide.
- March 26 – Canada makes One-Tonne Challenge.
- March 29 – The Progressive Canadian Party registers with Elections Canada to elect members into the House of Commons of Canada in the 2004 Canadian federal election.
- March 29 – RCMP raid an Ottawa area home, arrest Momin Khawaja on terrorism charges.
- March 29 – Peel Regional Municipality, Ontario police officer arrested for possessing $2.5 million worth of cocaine.
- March 29 – The federal Assisted Human Reproduction Act is signed into law.
- March 30 – Auditor General of Canada Sheila Fraser criticizes flaws in national security.
- March 30 – Ottawa area man Momin Khawaja arrested on March 29 is charged with acts of terrorism under the Canada Anti-Terrorism Act.
- March 31 – Colin Thatcher is denied early parole.
- March 31 – 170 people, including 29 Canadians, arrested in drug bust across Canada and the United States.
- March 31 – Discovery finds that million flag promise in 1996 by Sheila Copps was organized by Groupaction.
- March 31 – Federal Court of Canada rejects Canadian Recording Industry Association request to obtain names of music fileswappers, making the sharing legal.
- March 31 – Saskatchewan government releases 2004 budget, raising the Provincial Sales Taxes from 6% to 7%.

=== April ===
- April 1 – RCMP confirms arrest of Mohammad Momin Khawaja is related to arrests in United Kingdom.
- April 1 – United States Department of Homeland Security exempts Canadians from being fingerprinted and photographed when entering the United States.
- April 1 – Federal riding redistribution comes into effect: number of seats rises from 301 to 308.

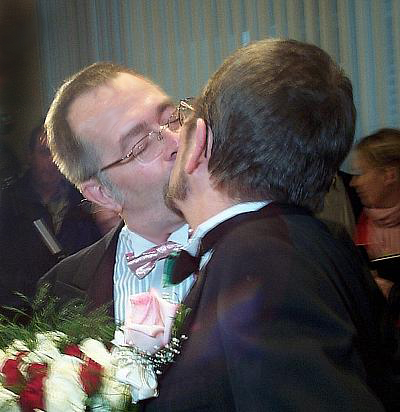
Michael Hendricks and René Leboeuf marry

- April 1 – Same-sex marriage in Canada: the first legal same-sex marriage in Quebec is celebrated; Michael Hendricks and René Leboeuf wed in Montreal.
- April 6 – Canada orders slaughter of 19 million British Columbia poultry due to avian influenza.
- April 6 – 2004 Canadian sponsorship scandal – Jean Pelletier, former Canadian Prime Minister's Office Chief of Staff, alleges there was "no direction" in the federal sponsorship programme.
- April 7 – Fadi Ihsan Fadel, a Canadian humanitarian working in Iraq, taken hostage among group of other nationals.
- April 7 – Former Member of Canadian Parliament Jack Ramsay's son Spencer found dead in their family home.
- April 8 – Nine Hells Angels members from Montreal are convicted of drug trafficking and gangsterism.
- April 8 – Department of Justice considering extraditing alleged mafia leader Vito Rizzuto to the United States. He is accused of three murders in 1981.
- April 14 – Prime Minister Paul Martin announces extension to deployment of current soldiers in Afghanistan until summer 2005.
- April 15 – Member of Parliament Svend Robinson confesses to stealing a ring from an auction firm and then takes medical leave.
- April 16 – The auction firm that Svend Robinson stole the ring from says it will not pursue charges against him.
- April 16 – Canadian hostage in Iraq, Fadi Ihsan Fadel, freed.
- April 16 – Canadian Member of Parliament John Cannis (Scarborough Centre Liberal Party) calls for deportation of Abdurahman Khadr.
- April 17 – Dalai Lama visits Canada for 19-day tour.
- April 17 – Canadian peacekeeper in Prnjavor, Bosnia and Herzegovina, injured in road accident, one civilian also injured. (See: Operation Palladium)
- April 18 – World Wrestling Entertainment holds its Backlash pay-per-view event from the Rexall Place in Edmonton, Alberta, Canada.
- April 20 – Rifat Mohammed Rifat, a Canadian citizen, taken hostage in Iraq.
- April 27 – Air Canada flight 109, a Halifax to Vancouver 767, is escorted by two CF-18s after a suspicious threat is received by North American Aerospace Defense Command.
- April 27 – Deputy Prime Minister of Canada Anne McLellan introduces new $690 million national security and foreign security initiative.
- April 29 – Prime Minister Martin speaks at a U.S. conference reaffirming position not to join coalition in Iraq, but says Canada wants to aid in rebuilding Iraq.
- April 29 – A North American Free Trade Agreement (NAFTA) panel rules in favour of Canada in the US - Canada softwood lumber dispute against the United States.

=== May ===
- May 3 – Canadian businessman Naji al-Kuwaiti is reported to have been taken hostage in Iraq on April 28; he is released May 4.
- May 10 – 2004 Canadian sponsorship scandal – Jean Brault, president of Groupaction, and Charles Guité arrested by the RCMP for fraud.
- May 17 – Ken Dryden announces his candidacy in the 2004 Canadian election representing the Liberal Party in the Canadian electoral district of York Centre.
- May 18 – Supreme Court of Canada upholds law on spending limit by Lobby groups during elections.
- May 18 – Karlheinz Schreiber ordered extradited to Germany on charges of fraud, bribery, and failure to pay taxes.
- May 27 – Conservative Party of Canada official languages critic Scott Reid resigns after making comments suggesting reduction of French language access.
- May 27 – Former Public Works Minister Alfonso Gagliano launches $4.5 million lawsuit against Prime Minister Martin and the federal government.
- May 27 – Farmers' income hits 25-year low in 2003 from drought and mad cow crisis.
- May 30 – Vandal(s) spraypaint anti-gay messages on the office of Liberal Party of Canada candidate Glen Murray (Charleswood—St. James). Murray was Canada's first openly homosexual municipal leader as the mayor of Winnipeg (1998–2004).

=== June ===
- June 3 – Canada–United States softwood lumber dispute: United States Commerce Department will cut its tax on softwood lumber exports, effective 2005.
- June 3 – Peel, Ontario Police charge another 13 officials at the federal Department of Human Resources Development in fraud, bribery, and receiving secret commissions investigation.
- June 10 – Elections Canada's Chief Electoral Officer announces changes to allow televised results of upcoming election without delay after closing of local polling stations.
- June 17 – Michael Briere pleads guilty to the murder of Holly Jones, admits to viewing child pornography immediately before the murder.
- June 18 – The Conservative Party of Canada issues, retracts, reissues, and re-retracts a news release entitled "Paul Martin Supports Child Pornography?".
- June 28 – The Liberal Party of Canada wins a minority government of 135 seats in the 2004 federal election (155 seats were needed for a majority). The Conservative Party of Canada wins 99 seats, New Democratic Party 19, Bloc Québécois 54, and one seat is won by an independent candidate.
- June 29 – Lethbridge, Alberta city councillor Dar Heatherington is convicted of public mischief after a police investigation concludes that she falsely alleged being stalked by a constituent. She previously faced similar charges after a 2003 investigation in Great Falls, Montana, concluded that she filed a false report of having been abducted and raped.

=== July ===
- July 2 – Nine-year-old Djamshid Djan Popal arrives in Toronto. Early diagnoses suggest Popal suffers from patent ductus arteriosus, a condition he cannot get treatment for in his native Afghanistan, but will be able to in Canada thanks to fundraising efforts by the Muslim Association of Hamilton and volunteering doctors.
- July 6 – Five-year-old Tamra Keepness, of Regina, is declared missing; massive police search ensues.
- July 11 – Hail and torrential rain causes flooding in Edmonton; damage to the West Edmonton Mall is estimated in the millions of dollars.
- July 13 – The Canadian Radio-television and Telecommunications Commission (CRTC) does not renew the broadcasting license of the Quebec City FM radio station CHOI, citing obscene and offensive content; it is the first time a Canadian station has been forced off the air as a result of crude material.
- July 14 – Same-sex marriage in Yukon: Yukon territory becomes the fourth province or territory to legalize same-sex marriage.
- July 14 – Foreign affairs minister Bill Graham orders the withdrawal of Canada's ambassador to Iran after Canada is denied attendance at the trial of Mohammed Reza Aghdam Ahmadi, alleged murderer of Canadian-Iranian citizen Zahra Kazemi.
- July 15 – Peterborough is hit with 235 mm of rain, backlogging the city's sewer system and flooding streets.
- July 16 – Iran announces it will allow some diplomatic observers at the trial of Zahra Kazemi's alleged murderer; Canada suspends the withdrawal of its ambassador to Iran.
- July 18 – Trial of Zahra Kazemi's alleged killer abruptly ends; Canadian ambassador to Iran is recalled.
- July 19 – Stepfather of missing Regina girl Tamra Keepness is charged with assault causing bodily harm; the alleged altercation occurred at 3 a.m. the morning of July 6, four hours after Tamra was last seen by the family.
- July 20 – Prime minister Paul Martin announces his new cabinet, which includes new faces such as ice hockey great Ken Dryden, former British Columbia premier Ujjal Dosanjh, and former Progressive Conservative and the openly gay Scott Brison.
- July 22 – An arrest is made in the Cecilia Zhang murder case, 9 months after she was abducted.
- July 24 – An Iranian court acquits the accused killer of Iranian-Canadian journalist Zahra Kazemi of charges of "semi-intentional murder".
- July 30 – Two audits claim that suspended Canada Post president Andre Ouellet overlooked contract-tendering and hiring protocols and ran a massive expense budget; he is given a week to explain his actions.

=== August ===
- August 5 – Bill Clinton signs his autobiography My Life at a Toronto bookstore and draws huge lineups.
- August 6 – Former NDP MP Svend Robinson pleads guilty to theft over $5000 for stealing a ring, and receives a conditional discharge; he avoids jail time and a criminal record but receives a sentence of 100 hours of community service.
- August 9 – Lethbridge, Alberta city councillor Dar Heatherington resigns after being convicted of public mischief.
- August 12 – André Ouellet resigns as head of Canada Post.
- August 15 – World Wrestling Entertainment holds its SummerSlam event from the Air Canada Centre in Toronto, Ontario, Canada.
- August 19 – Lyse Lemieux, Chief Justice of the Superior Court of Quebec, resigns her position as a result of criminal charges.
- August 20 – Groupe TVA and Sun Media announce plans to acquire Toronto, Ontario television station Toronto One from CHUM Limited when CHUM purchases the Craig Media stations.
- August 20 – Catherine Clark is announced as the new host of a daily local talk show in Ottawa, Ontario.
- August 24 – Louise Charron and Rosalie Abella are nominated to the Supreme Court of Canada.
- August 25 – A Toronto man takes one woman hostage outside of Union Station before being shot dead by a Toronto Police Emergency Task Force sniper.
- August 26 – Larry Fisher (murderer) denied parole. Saskatchewan plans an inquiry possibly starting in 2005 into the incident.
- August 26 – Todd Bertuzzi enters not guilty plea in British Columbia court for assaulting Steve Moore.
- August 30 – Charron and Abella are formally appointed to the SCOC.
- August 30 – The Canadian Passport Office asks permission to use facial recognition technology to detect potential terrorists.

=== September ===
- September 8 – Canada gives the United Nations $20 million for Sudan peacekeeping.
- September 10 – The federal government announces $500-million to help cattle farmers hurt by the restricted trade of cattle stemming from one case of Mad Cow disease in 2003.
- September 10 – Former Lethbridge, Alberta, city councillor Dar Heatherington is given a 20-month conditional sentence for public mischief.
- September 13–15 – Health care conference in Ottawa between Prime Minister Paul Martin and the provinces.
- September 13 – Canada's first same-sex divorce occurs, in Ontario.
- September 16 – Same-sex marriage in Manitoba: The Supreme Court of Manitoba rules the province's ban on same-sex marriages unconstitutional.
- September 18 – John Tory wins the leadership of the Progressive Conservative Party of Ontario.
- September 19 – Mihai Eminescu Statue, Montreal unveiled.
- September 22 – Ottawa forgives debts of Senegal, Ghana and Ethiopia.
- September 22 – Canadian Fairuz Yamucky, who was held captive in Iraq for 16 days, is returned home.
- September 24 – Same-sex marriage in Nova Scotia: The Supreme Court of Nova Scotia rules the province's ban on same-sex marriages unconstitutional.
- September 27 – Calgary Health Region investigates E. coli outbreak affecting more than 600 people. Three local restaurants suspected.
- September 29 – About 24 North Koreans in Beijing, China, successfully scale the wall of the Canadian embassy seeking asylum.
- September 29 – Nelson, British Columbia city council reject plan to build a monument dedicated to American draft dodgers.
- September 30 – It is announced that Governor General Adrienne Clarkson will serve an additional year as Canada's viceroy.
- September 30 – Air Canada emerges from bankruptcy protection.

=== October ===
- October 1 – Governor General Adrienne Clarkson's term extended one year.
- October 1 – Manitoba, New Brunswick, and Alberta introduce new anti-smoking laws.
- October 2 – Poet/musician Meryn Cadell comes out as transgender on CBC Radio One.
- October 4 – Canada's first minority government since 1979 is sworn in.
- October 4 – Amnesty International releases a report slamming Canada's lack of protection of Aboriginal women.
- October 4 – Canada opens an investigation against United Nations Relief and Works Agency for possible relations with Hamas militants.
- October 5 – Speech from the Throne.
- October 5 – A fire aboard HMCS Chicoutimi (SSK 879), located off the coast of Ireland.
- October 6 – Same-sex marriage in Canada: The Supreme Court of Canada begins three days of hearings to determine the legality of same-sex marriage under the Constitution.
- October 13 – HMCS Chicoutimi (SSK 879) Lieutenant Chris Saunders's funeral is held at a Halifax, Nova Scotia church.
- October 14 – A Boeing 747 MK Airlines cargo plane crashes after takeoff at Halifax International Airport.
- October 17 – The ten finalists in the CBC's The Greatest Canadian series are announced. They are Sir Frederick Banting, Alexander Graham Bell, Tommy Douglas, Terry Fox, Wayne Gretzky, Sir John A. Macdonald, Lester B. Pearson, David Suzuki, Pierre Trudeau and, in a surprise which many Canadian media commentators have heavily mocked, Don Cherry.
- October 19 – A lawyer in Toronto successfully challenges a traffic ticket on the basis that the city had not posted bilingual traffic signs in accordance with Ontario's French Language Services Act of 1986. The city is expected to appeal the decision.
- October 20 – British Columbia lowers its provincial sales tax from 7.5% to 7%.
- October 20 – The Canadian dollar closes at $0.8029, its first time above $0.80 since 1993.
- October 25 – Alberta premier Ralph Klein obtains a dissolution of the legislature; an election is called for November 22.
- October 28 – Minister of Justice Irwin Cotler sends Steven Truscott's case to the Court of Appeal for Ontario, 45 years after the sentence to hang.
- October 28 – Supreme Court of Canada rules Newfoundland and Labrador was justified in deferring pay equity to women during a financial crisis.

=== November ===
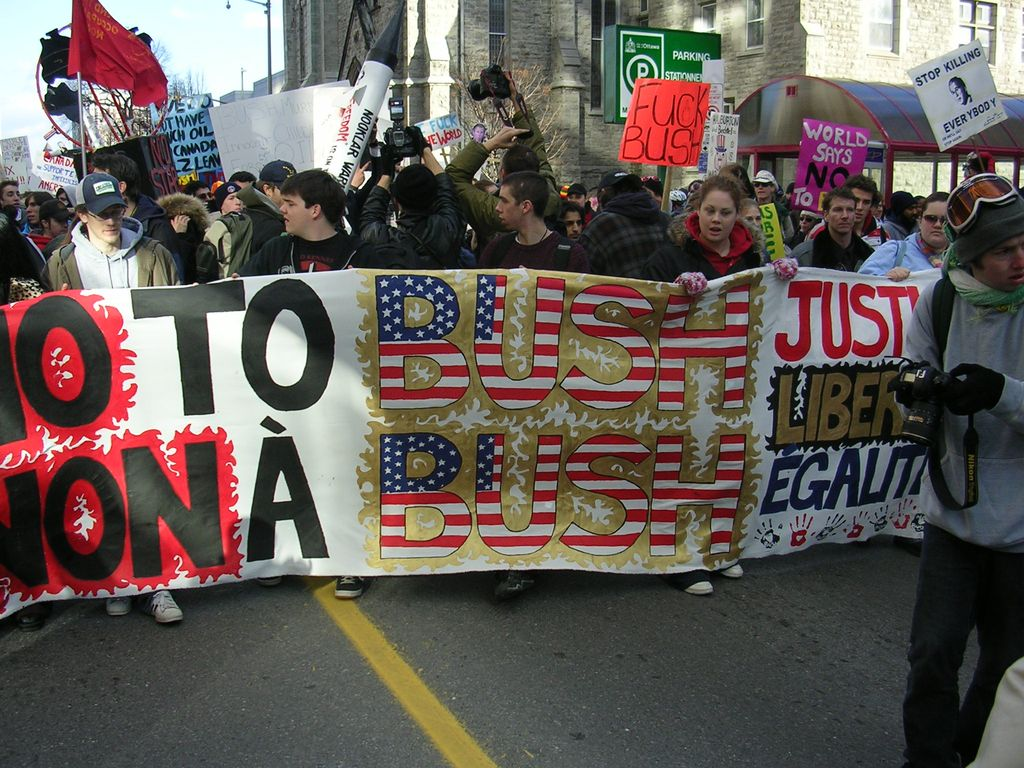
Protests against U.S. President George W. Bush in Ottawa on the day of his visit

.

- November 4 – Two couples file suit for same-sex marriage in Newfoundland and Labrador.
- November 4 – Citizenship and Immigration Canada web traffic jumps sharply as many U.S. Democratic Party supporters react to the recent U.S. election.
- November 5 – Same sex marriage in Saskatchewan: A Saskatchewan judge declares that same-sex couples have the right to marry in that province.
- November 12 – The Saskatoon Police Department fire two constables for their involvement in the Neil Stonechild case.
- November 15 – The United States Department of Homeland Security tightens border security at three checkpoints, including Blue Water Bridge in Sarnia, Ontario — 17 other checkpoints will have similar security before 2005, part of the US-VISIT programme.
- November 15 – The U.S. Securities and Exchange Commission opens a civil fraud lawsuit against Conrad Black.
- November 16 – It is announced that U.S. President George W. Bush will visit Canada November 30 for a two-day visit, his first formal visit to the country since becoming president in 2001.
- November 18 – Prime Minister Paul Martin expels Mississauga—Erindale Member of Parliament Carolyn Parrish from the Liberal Party caucus, after the controversial MP tells the Canadian Press she feels no loyalty to the party or the prime minister.
- November 18 – The Canadian Radio-television and Telecommunications Commission approves an application by the American news channel Fox News for a digital licence.
- November 19 – The CRTC approves CHUM Limited's purchase of Craig Media.
- November 21 – The Toronto Argonauts win the Grey Cup for the first time since 1997.
- November 22 – Ralph Klein wins his 4th mandate as Premier of Alberta.
- November 29 – Tommy Douglas is voted "The Greatest Canadian" in a CBC popular television series poll.
- November 30 – U.S. President George W. Bush arrives in Ottawa for a two-day official visit.

=== December ===
- December 9 – The Supreme Court of Canada issues its decision for the same-sex marriage reference bill sent to it by the Government of Canada. The court finds that the federal government has jurisdiction over the definition of marriage and can pass a law to change it.
- December 19 – Prime Minister Paul Martin arrives in Libya for an official two-day visit. This is the first visit to that country by a Canadian prime minister.
- December 21 – The Supreme Court of Newfoundland and Labrador legalizes same-sex marriage.
- December 23 – Danny Williams, Premier of Newfoundland and Labrador pulls down the Canadian flags in a protest of his province's treatment by the federal government.
- December 26 – 15 Canadians are among the victims of the 2004 Indian Ocean tsunami.
- December 27 – The Canadian government donates $4 million to the 2004 Indian Ocean tsunami relief effort and pledge a further $36 million.
- December 29 – The United States Department of Agriculture announces the resumption of beef importation effective March 7, 2005 after banning it after finding mad cow disease in one Alberta pig.

=== Date unknown ===
- Beach Travellers, a Vancouver-based tour operator is founded.
- Ouanani, a world music group is formed in Montréal.

== Arts and literature ==
=== New books ===
- Wayson Choy, All That Matters
- Jane Jacobs, Dark Age Ahead
- Alice Munro, Runaway
- Miriam Toews, A Complicated Kindness
- Bryan Lee O'Malley, Scott Pilgrim's Precious Little Life

=== Awards ===
- Giller Prize: Alice Munro, Runaway
- Governor General's Awards: See 2004 Governor General's Awards.
- Griffin Poetry Prize: Anne Simpson, Loop
- Stephen Leacock Award: Ian Ferguson, Village of the Small House: A Memoir of Sorts
- Juno Awards of 2004

=== Film ===
- February 29 – Denys Arcand's film The Barbarian Invasions wins the Academy Award for Best Foreign Language Film

=== Television ===
- January 12 – Rick Mercer Report and This Is Wonderland debut on the CBC

== Sport ==
=== January to March ===
- January 5 – In the 2004 World Junior Ice Hockey Championships, Team USA defeats Team Canada 4–3 in the Final at Helsinki, Finland
- January 7 – The National Hockey League suspends the Toronto Maple Leafs' Mats Sundin after he throws his stick into the stands after it breaks. No one was hurt and he was suspended only one game.
- January 7 – Randy Ferbey wins Canada Cup opener.
- January 29 – Hockey Canada and the Canadian Hockey League jointly announce Vancouver will host the 2006 World Junior Ice Hockey Championships
- February 9 – Canadian Clara Hughes wins bronze in the world speed skating championship
- February 10 – The Canadian softball team wins silver in the world softball championship
- February 10 – Canadian François Bourque wins bronze in the world junior alpine ski championship
- February 29 – Colleen Jones' curling team wins the Scott Tournament of Hearts, in Red Deer, Alberta, 7–4
- March 6–14 – Nokia Brier at Saskatoon, Saskatchewan
- March 8 – Vancouver Police Department investigate a National Hockey League incident involving Vancouver Canucks Todd Bertuzzi and Colorado Avalanche rookie Steve Moore. Moore was hit by Bertuzzi resulting in Moore's receiving a neck injury and concussion. Moore is out of the lineup indefinitely.
- March 11 – Vancouver Canucks forward Todd Bertuzzi suspended without pay for remainder of regular season and playoffs for injuring Steve Moore of the Colorado Avalanche

=== April to June ===
- April 6 – Canada wins the IIHF 2004 Women's World Ice Hockey Championships defeating the United States, 2–0 in Halifax, Nova Scotia
- April 24 – Canada wins the Women's World Curling Championship
- May 9 – The Canadian national men's hockey team wins the Men's World Ice Hockey Championships 5–3 over Sweden
- May 23 – Kelowna Rockets won their First Memorial Cup by defeating the Gatineau Olympiques 2 to 1. The Tournament was played at Prospera Place in Kelowna, British Columbia
- May 29 – Peter Gibbons wins CASCAR's MOPAR 250 at Delaware Speedway
- June 6 – Peter Gibbons wins CASCAR's Power Water 200 at Cayuga 2000 Speedway
- June 7 – Tampa Bay Lightning won their First Stanley Cup by defeating the Calgary Flames 4 games to 3. Murray Harbour, PEI's Brad Richards was awarded the Conn Smythe Trophy
- June 12 – Mark Dilley wins CASCAR's Dodge Dealers of Ontario 200 at Peterborough Speedway
- June 13 – Michael Schumacher wins the 2004 Canadian Grand Prix held in Montreal, Quebec.
- June 20 – Jeff Lapcevich wins CASCAR's Clarington 200 at Mosport International Raceway

=== July to December ===
- July 4 – Dave Whitlock wins CASCAR's Canada Day Shootout at Cayuga 2000 Speedway
- July 10 – Jeff Lapcevich wins CASCAR Toronto Indy 100 km at the Toronto Molson Indy
- July 19 – Two-time Olympic medallist Nicolas Gill is chosen by the Canadian Olympic Committee to be Canada's flag-bearer at the 2004 Summer Olympics.
- July 24 – Jeff Lapcevich wins CASCAR's Canadian Tire 100 at the Vancouver Molson Indy
- July 31 – Dave Whitlock wins CASCAR's MOPAR Parts 300 at Race City Motorsport Park
- August 11 – Windsor, Ontario's Petey Williams became the First Canadian to win the TNA X-Division Championship by winning a Gauntlet for the Gold match at Total Nonstop Actions's Weekly PPV #106 at the Tennessee Fairgrounds in Nashville
- August 29 – Closing ceremonies for the 2004 Summer Olympics are held. Canada wins 12 medals, its lowest medal count since taking 10 at the 1988 Summer Olympics in Seoul.
- September 2 – Minor league baseball (AAA) Pacific Coast League baseball leaves Canada as the Edmonton Trappers play their last game.
- September 14 – Canada wins the World Cup of Hockey
- September 29 – The Montreal Expos play their last game in Montreal. The team moved to Washington, D.C. for 2005.
- November 21 – Toronto Argonauts won their Fifteenth Grey Cup by defeating the BC Lions 27 to 19 in the 92nd Grey Cup played Frank Clair Stadium in Ottawa
- November 27 – Laval Rouge et Or won their Third Vanier Cup by defeating the Saskatchewan Huskies 7 to 1 in the 40th Vanier Cup played at Ivor Wynne Stadium in Hamilton, Ontario

== Births ==
- January 4 – Peyton Kennedy, actress
- May 12 – Émilie Bierre, actress
- July 6 – Dylan Kingwell, actor

== Deaths ==
=== January to March ===
- January 4 – Robert Hylton Brisco, politician (born 1928)
- January 7
  - Doug Creighton, founder of the Toronto Sun
  - Doug Morton, member of the Regina Five (painter)
- January 15 – Alex Barris, actor and writer (born 1922)
- January 17 – Jim Penner, businessman and politician (born 1939)
- February 8 – Nicholas Goldschmidt, conductor, administrator, teacher, performer, music festival entrepreneur and artistic director (born 1908)
- February 9
  - Gerald Bouey, 4th Governor of the Bank of Canada (born 1920)
  - Claude Ryan, politician (born 1925)
  - Janusz Żurakowski, fighter and test pilot, first test pilot of Avro Arrow (born 1914)
- February 21 – Guido Molinari, artist (born 1933)
- February 29
  - Toni Onley, painter (born 1928)
  - Nat Taylor, inventor of the cineplex (born 1905)
- March 3 – Tooker Gomberg, politician and environmental activist (born 1955)
- March 18 – Harrison McCain, businessman (born 1927)
- March 19 – Mitchell Sharp, politician and Minister (born 1911)
- March 20 – Pierre Sévigny, soldier, author, politician and academic (born 1917)
- March 24 – Dominic Agostino, politician (born 1959)
- March 26 – Sheldon Oberman, children's writer (born 1949)
- March 30 – Michael H. Rayner, Acting Auditor General of Canada

=== April to June ===
- April 14 – Micheline Charest, producer (born 1953)
- April 23 – Ross Rutledge, field hockey player (born 1962)
- May 1 – Larkin Kerwin, physicist, President of the Canadian Space Agency (born 1924)
- May 4 — David Reimer, Canadian man, born male but reassigned female and raised as a girl after a botched circumcision (b. 1965)
- May 9 – Eric Kierans, economist and politician (born 1914)
- June 4 – Brian Linehan, television host (born 1944)
- June 14 – Jack McClelland, publisher (born 1922)
- June 17 – Gerry McNeil, ice hockey player (born 1926)
- June 29 – Alvin Hamilton, politician (born 1912)

=== July to September ===
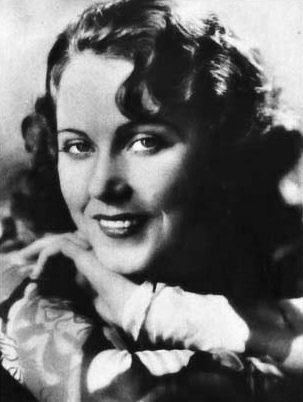
Fay Wray – Publicity photo, c. 1930

- July 11 – Frances Hyland, actress (born 1927)
- July 12 – Betty Oliphant, ballet mistress, co-founder of the National Ballet School of Canada (born 1918)
- July 19 – Sylvia Daoust, sculptor (born 1902)
- July 30 – Andre Noble, actor (born 1979)
- August 8 – Fay Wray, actress (born 1907)
- August 17 – Frank Cotroni, mobster (born 1931)
- September 4 – Moe Norman, golfer (born 1929)
- September 5 – Gerald Merrithew, politician (born 1931)
- September 10 – Leonard Birchall, World War II hero (born 1915)
- September 15 – Walter Stewart, writer, editor and journalism educator (born 1931)

=== October to December ===
- October 3 – John Cerutti, baseball player (born 1960)
- October 16 – Doug Bennett, singer, musician and music video director (born 1951)
- October 19
  - Calvin Ruck, anti-racism activist and senator (born 1925)
  - Lewis Urry, chemical engineer and inventor (born 1927)
- October 27 – Al Clouston, storyteller, humourist and author (born 1910)
- November 13 – Ellen Fairclough, politician and first female member of the Canadian Cabinet (born 1905)
- November 15 – John Morgan, comedian (born 1930)
- November 30 – Pierre Berton, non-fiction author (b. 1920)
- December 16
  - Agnes Martin, painter (born 1912)
  - Lawrence D. O'Brien, politician (born 1951)
- December 22
  - Paul Métivier, World War I veteran (born 1900)
  - Alice Strike, Canada's last surviving female World War I veteran (born 1896)

== See also ==
- 2004 in Canadian television
- List of Canadian films of 2004
- 2004 Canadian electoral calendar
