= 2003 in Canada =

- Decades: 1980s; 1990s; 2000s; 2010s; 2020s
- See also: History of Canada; Timeline of Canadian history; List of years in Canada

Events from the year 2003 in Canada.

== Incumbents ==
=== Crown ===
- Monarch – Elizabeth II

=== Federal government ===
- Governor General – Adrienne Clarkson
- Prime Minister – Jean Chrétien (until December 12) then Paul Martin
- Chief Justice – Beverley McLachlin (British Columbia)
- Parliament – 37th

=== Provincial governments ===
==== Lieutenant governors ====
- Lieutenant Governor of Alberta – Lois Hole
- Lieutenant Governor of British Columbia – Iona Campagnolo
- Lieutenant Governor of Manitoba – Peter Liba
- Lieutenant Governor of New Brunswick – Marilyn Trenholme Counsell (until August 26) then Herménégilde Chiasson
- Lieutenant Governor of Newfoundland and Labrador – Edward Roberts
- Lieutenant Governor of Nova Scotia – Myra Freeman
- Lieutenant Governor of Ontario – James Bartleman
- Lieutenant Governor of Prince Edward Island – Léonce Bernard
- Lieutenant Governor of Quebec – Lise Thibault
- Lieutenant Governor of Saskatchewan – Lynda Haverstock

==== Premiers ====
- Premier of Alberta – Ralph Klein
- Premier of British Columbia – Gordon Campbell
- Premier of Manitoba – Gary Doer
- Premier of New Brunswick – Bernard Lord
- Premier of Newfoundland and Labrador – Roger Grimes (until November 6) then Danny Williams
- Premier of Nova Scotia – John Hamm
- Premier of Ontario – Ernie Eves (until October 23) then Dalton McGuinty
- Premier of Prince Edward Island – Pat Binns
- Premier of Quebec – Bernard Landry (until April 29) then Jean Charest
- Premier of Saskatchewan – Lorne Calvert

=== Territorial governments ===
==== Commissioners ====
- Commissioner of Yukon – Jack Cable
- Commissioner of Northwest Territories – Glenna Hansen
- Commissioner of Nunavut – Peter Irniq

==== Premiers ====
- Premier of the Northwest Territories – Stephen Kakfwi (until December 10) then Joe Handley
- Premier of Nunavut – Paul Okalik
- Premier of Yukon – Dennis Fentie

== Events ==
=== January to March ===
- January – A court in Windsor, Ontario, invalidates Canada's marijuana laws.
- January 20 – Avalanche kills eight skiers in eastern British Columbia.
- January 25 – Jack Layton is elected to replace Alexa McDonough as party leader at the New Democratic Party leadership convention.
- January 26 – Marc Ouellet is installed as Archbishop of Quebec, and Primate of Canada.
- February 2 – An avalanche in Glacier National Park, British Columbia, kills six boys and one girl.
- February 23 – World Wrestling Entertainment holds its No Way Out pay-per-view event from the Bell Centre in Montreal, Quebec.
- March 5 – Sui-chu Kwan, who travelled to Hong Kong in February, dies of SARS in Toronto.
- March 7 – Endeavour Hydrothermal Vents on the British Columbia Coast becomes Canada's first marine protected area.
- March 10 – Toronto's Grace Hospital closes as a result of SARS, the first of many hospitals to do so.
- March 17 – Health Canada announces 17 suspected SARS cases in Canada.
- March 24 – YellowTimes.org website is shut down.
- March 26 – Ontario declares a public health emergency as a result of SARS.

=== April to June ===
- April 14 – In the Quebec election Jean Charest's Liberals defeat Bernard Landry's Parti Québécois.
- April 23 – The World Health Organization issues a travel advisory against Toronto because of SARS, Canadian officials protest the decision.
- April 25 – After more than two weeks with no new cases of SARS, health workers begin to suggest the disease is contained.
- April 29 – Jean Charest becomes premier of Quebec, replacing Bernard Landry.
- May 12 – Holly Jones, a ten-year-old girl, disappears in Toronto; parts of her body are later found floating in Lake Ontario.
- May 20 – An Alberta cow is found to have been infected with bovine spongiform encephalopathy (BSE); the United States, Japan, and a number of other nations halt all imports of Canadian beef.
- May 22 – SARS re-emerges in a Toronto hospital.
- June 9 – In the New Brunswick election Bernard Lord's Conservatives lose seats but are re-elected to a majority government.
- June 10 – The Court of Appeal for Ontario rules the ban on same-sex marriage illegal, and marriages begin immediately.
- June 10 – The Michaels are wed in Ontario, making their marriage the first legal same-sex marriage in Canada.
- June 30 – Canada's first space telescope is launched.

=== July to September ===
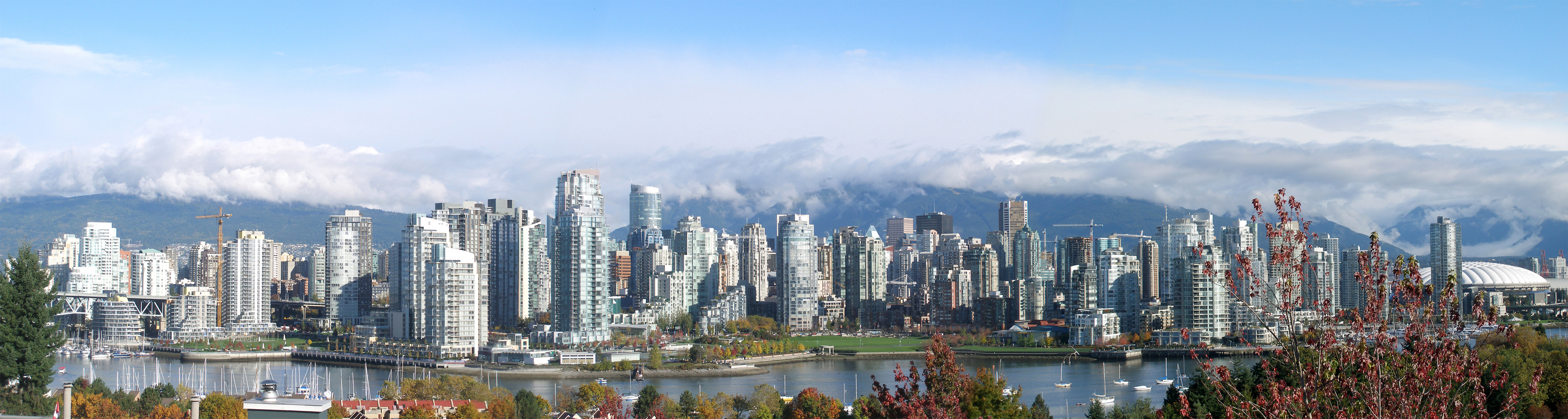
Aerial view of Vancouver

- July 2 – The International Olympic Committee awards the 21st Olympic Winter Games to Vancouver.
- July 8 – British Columbia follows Ontario's lead and permits same-sex marriage.
- July 11 – Zahra Kazemi is beaten to death by Iranian security forces.
- August 5 – In the Nova Scotia election John Hamm's Conservatives are re-elected to a minority government.
- August 9 – The United States eases its ban on Canadian beef.
- August 14 – The United Church of Canada votes to approve same-sex marriages.
- August 14 – A massive blackout hits Ontario and the northeastern United States.
- August 18 – Zachary Turner murdered by his mother in Conception Bay South. She had controversially been bailed and granted custody of the toddler despite facing extradition and trial for the murder of Zachary's father. The case was documented in the film Dear Zachary: A Letter to a Son About His Father
- August 23–24 – 2003 Rubik's Cube World Championship
- August 30 – Canada becomes the first country to implement the World Trade Organization initiative to supply generic drugs to developing countries to help fight AIDS/HIV.
- September – Canada opens its embassy in Kabul.
- September 19 – The remnants of Hurricane Isabel cross over Lake Erie in Ontario, killing one indirectly and causing local power outages.
- September 23 – The 443 km^{2} Ward Hunt Ice Shelf fractures in the Arctic, releasing water within a contained freshwater lake.
- September 29 – Hurricane Juan makes landfall as a category 2 storm at Halifax, Nova Scotia. Four were killed directly and four indirectly.

=== October to December ===
- October 2 – Ontario Election. Dalton McGuinty's Liberals defeats Ernie Eves's Tories.
- October 5 – Maher Arar is freed from jail in Syria.
- October 8 – After serving 19 years of his life sentence, a jury finds Colin Thatcher eligible to apply for early parole.
- October 21 – Newfoundland and Labrador election: Premier Roger Grimes's Liberals are defeated by Danny Williams's Conservatives.
- October 21 – Marc Ouellet is elevated to the Cardinalate.
- October 23 – An El Al Jet is diverted twice, first to Montreal then to Hamilton, Ontario, after a threat is made against Toronto Pearson International Airport.
- October 23 – Dalton McGuinty becomes premier of Ontario.
- November 5 – In the Saskatchewan election Premier Lorne Calvert's NDP is re-elected to a thin majority.
- November 6 – Danny Williams becomes premier of Newfoundland and Labrador, replacing Roger Grimes.
- November 10 – Municipal elections occur across Ontario; In the Toronto election, David Miller is elected mayor.
- November 13 – The Canadian dollar value closes at a 10-year high of US$0.7695.
- November 18 – Canada offers Ontario $330 million in relief of the past summer's SARS virus impact.
- November 19 – An interim report on the cause of the August 14, blackout is released, which blames problems in Ohio.
- November 27 – Canadian Alliance party leader Stephen Harper fires CA Member of Parliament Larry Spencer as Family Values Critic after anti-gay remarks.
- November 28 – Liberal Party Member John Manley announces his retirement from politics.
- November 28 – Type A influenza kills a boy in southern Ontario, the third victim in the province killed by the same strain of the virus. Numerous influenza-related deaths also reported in the United States and United Kingdom.
- November 30 – Abdurahman Khadr returns to Canada from Afghanistan after being imprisoned by the Americans at Guantanamo Bay.
- December 8 – In Edmonton, the United States awards Bronze Stars to 26 Canadian soldiers of 3rd Battalion Princess Patricia's Canadian Light Infantry Battle Group who distinguished themselves serving alongside U.S. troops in Afghanistan in 2002. The four who were killed in the friendly-fire Tarnak Farm incident are awarded the medal posthumously. Canadian Chief of Staff, General Ray Henault gives a Commander-in-Chief Unit Commendation on behalf of Governor General Adrienne Clarkson.
- December 10 – A strike paralyzes BC Ferries.
- December 10 – Joe Handley becomes premier of the Northwest Territories, replacing Stephen Kakfwi.
- December 12 – Paul Martin is sworn in as Canada's 21st prime minister.
- December 14 – Pamela Holopainen, a 22-year-old Inuk woman, disappears after leaving a house party in Timmins, Ontario.
- December 24 – Canada's Department of Agriculture places a partial ban on imported beef from United States due to a single case of mad cow disease in Washington.
- December 30 – Governor General Adrienne Clarkson, with her husband John Ralston Saul, arrives in Afghanistan to meet with Canadian troops.

=== Date unknown ===
- Le Tour du Québec en BD, novel albums are published.

== Arts and literature ==
=== Literary awards ===
- Books in Canada First Novel Award: Michel Basilières, Black Bird
- Giller Prize for Canadian Fiction: M.G. Vassanji: The In-Between World of Vikram Lall
- See 2003 Governor General's Awards for a complete list of winners and finalists for those awards.
- Geoffrey Bilson Award: Joan Clark, The Word for Home
- Gerald Lampert Award: Kathy Mac, Nail Hunters Plan for Strength and Growth
- Griffin Poetry Prize: Margaret Avison, Concrete and Wild Carrot
- Pat Lowther Award: Dionne Brand, Thirsty
- Marian Engel Award: Elisabeth Harvor
- Matt Cohen Prize: Fred Bodsworth
- Norma Fleck Award:
- Rogers Writers' Trust Fiction Prize: Kevin Patterson, Country of Cold
- Stephen Leacock Award: Dan Needles, With Axe and Flask: A History of Persephone Township From Pre-Cambrian Times to the Present
- Timothy Findley Award: Guy Vanderhaeghe
- Trillium Book Award English: Thomas King (prose) and Adam Sol (poetry)
- Trillium Book Award French: Serge Denis and François Paré (prose) and Angèle Bassolé-Ouédraogo (poetry)
- Vicky Metcalf Award: Roslyn Schwartz

=== Music ===
- October 14 – The online music store Puretracks launches
- Shania Twain's CD Up! is a hit
- Sarah McLachlan's CD Afterglow is released, her first studio album in six years.

=== Television ===
- American Idol comes to Canada as Canadian Idol, hosted by Ben Mulroney (son of Brian Mulroney)
- On This Hour Has 22 Minutes, Colin Mochrie leaves the cast; Mary Walsh is expected for six episodes but leaves; Shaun Majumder joins
- Jessica Holmes joins the cast of Royal Canadian Air Farce

== Sport ==
- February 22 – 2003 Canada Winter Games
- June 9 – Montreal's Jean-Sébastien Giguère of the Mighty Ducks of Anaheim is awarded the Conn Smythe Trophy in a losing effort
- November 16 – The Edmonton Eskimos win their 12th Grey Cup by defeating the Montreal Alouettes 34 to 22 in the 91st Grey Cup played at Taylor Field in Regina
- November 22 – The 2003 Heritage Classic, the first outdoor game in NHL history, is played in Edmonton.
- November 22 – The Laval Rouge et Or win their second Vanier Cup by defeating Saint Mary's Huskies by a score of 14–7 in the 39th Vanier Cup played at Skydome in Toronto

== Births ==
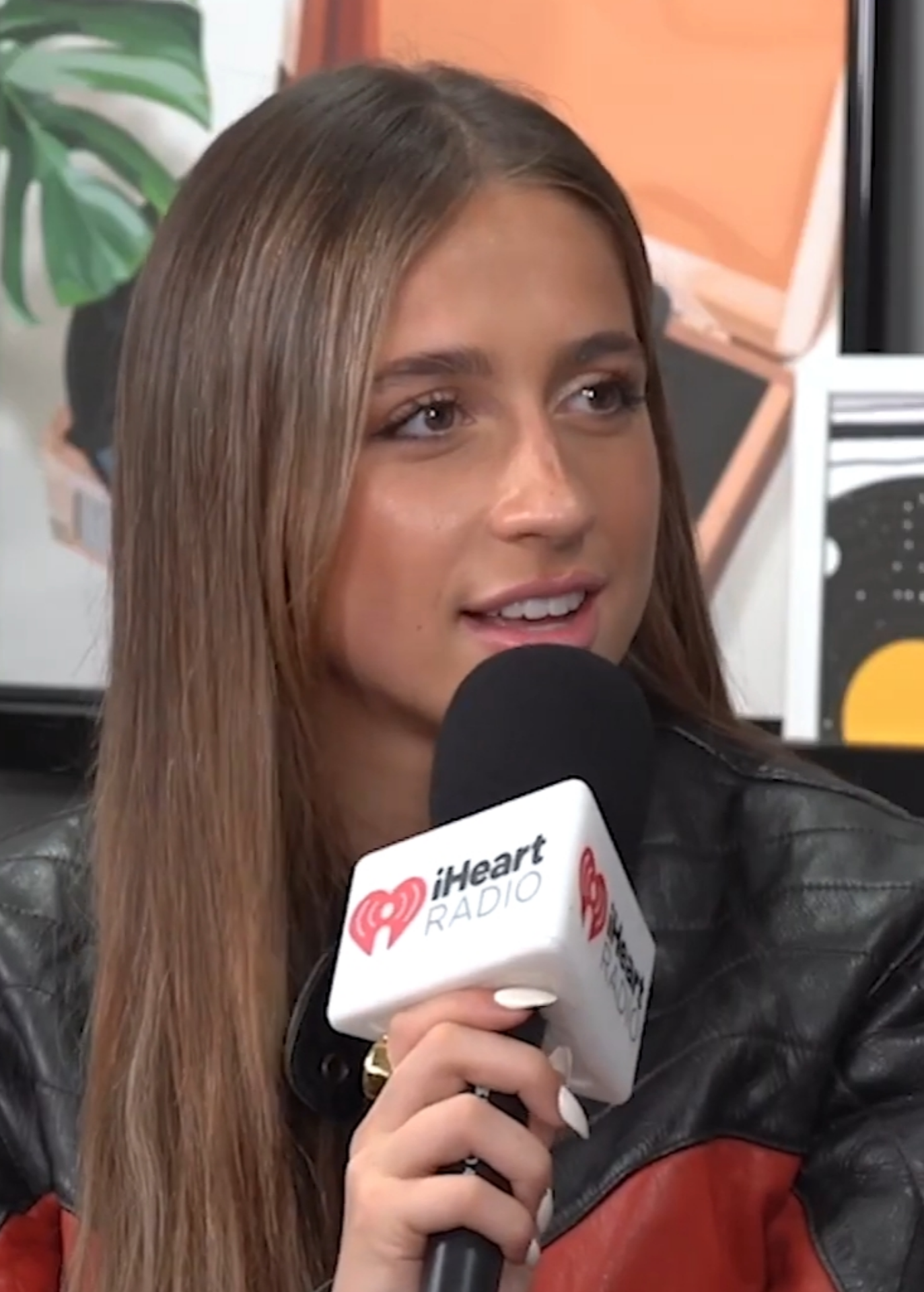
Tate McRae

- January 21 – Natalie Garcia, rhythmic gymnast
- January 24 – Johnny Orlando, singer and actor
- June 16 – Anna Cathcart, actress
- July 1 – Tate McRae, singer and dancer
- September 28 – Lauren Spencer-Smith, singer-songwriter

== Deaths ==
=== January to June ===
- January 3 – Henry Botterell, World War I fighter pilot (born 1896)
- January 20 – Bill Werbeniuk, snooker player (born 1947)
- January 28 – Elsie Gibbons, politician, first women to be elected mayor of a municipality in Quebec (born 1903)
- March 19 – Émile Genest, actor (born 1921)
- March 31 – Harold Scott MacDonald Coxeter, geometer (born 1907)
- April 8 – Vatche Arslanian, Canadian Red Cross worker, killed in Iraq (born 1955)
- April 9 – Richard Doyle, journalist, editor and Senator (born 1923)
- April 26 – Rosemary Brown, politician (born 1930)
- May 13 – John Savage, politician and Premier of Nova Scotia (born 1932)
- May 18 – Barb Tarbox, anti-smoking activist (born 1961)
- June – Donald Jack, novelist and playwright (born 1924)
- June 14 – Jacob Froese, politician (born 1917)
- June 15 – Hume Cronyn, actor (born 1911)
- June 16 – Pierre Bourgault, politician and essayist (born 1934)
- June 21 – Roger Neilson, ice hockey coach (born 1934)

=== July to December ===
- July 11 – Zahra Kazemi, photographer, died in Iranian custody (born 1949)
- July 16 – Carol Shields, author (born 1935)
- August 9 – Daniel Ling, speech teacher and professor (1926–2003)
- August 18 – Zachary Turner, murder victim (born 2002)
- August 19 – Chris Klein-Beekman, aid worker killed in Iraq (born 1971)
- September 5 – Gisele MacKenzie, singer (born 1927)
- September 8
  - Jaclyn Linetsky, actress (born 1986)
  - Doris Ogilvie, diver (born 1912)
- September 20 – Vernon Singer, politician (born 1919)
- October 7 – Izzy Asper, tax lawyer and media magnate (born 1932)
- October 13 – Bertram Brockhouse, physicist, shared the Nobel Prize in Physics in 1994 (born 1918)
- October 16 – Stu Hart, wrestler, promoter and trainer (born 1915)
- October 20 – Clarence Dunlap, Chief of Air Staff, Royal Canadian Air Force (born 1908)
- November 15 – Ray Lewis, track and field athlete, Olympic bronze medalist, first Canadian-born black Olympic medalist (born 1910)
- November 24 – Hugh Kenner, literary scholar, critic and professor (born 1923)
- November 25 – Johnathon Robert Madden, murder victim (born 1991)
- December 16 – Robert Stanfield, politician and 24th Premier of Nova Scotia (born 1914)
- December 23 – John Newlove, poet (born 1938)

== See also ==
- 2003 in Canadian television
- List of Canadian films of 2003
