= List of NASCAR Canada Series drivers =

This is a list of drivers who have competed in the NASCAR Pinty's Series. This list is accurate up to the end of the 2010 season.

Driver	Province or Country	Seasons	Championship titles	Races	Poles	Wins	Top 5	Top 10
Ron Beauchamp, Jr.	Ontario	2007-2010	0	51	3	0	16	26
Francois Bellemare	Quebec	2010	0	1	0	0	0	0
Pierre Bourque	Ontario	2007-2010	0	25	0	0	0	4
Jonathan Bouvrete	Quebec	2009	0	1	0	0	0	0
Jason Bowles	California	2010	0	3	0	0	2	2
Patrice Brisebois	Quebec	2009-2010	0	4	0	0	0	0
Doug Brown	Ontario	2007-2008	0	22	0	0	0	7
Robin Buck	Ontario	2007-2010	0	13	0	0	3	5
Donald Chisholm	Nova Scotia	2007-2010	0	8	0	0	1	2
Marc-Andre Cliche	Quebec	2010	0	1	0	0	0	0
Andre Coursol	Quebec	2007-2009	0	8	0	0	0	1
Daniel Decoste	Quebec	2008	0	1	0	0	0	1
Brennan Didero	Ontario	2009-2010	0	2	0	0	0	0
Mark Dilley	Ontario	2007-2010	0	51	3	2	16	28
Michel Disdier	France	2007	0	1	0	0	0	0
Maryeve Dufault	Quebec	2010	0	2	0	0	0	0
Miguel Duhamel	Quebec	2007-2009	0	4	0	0	0	1
Jean-Francois Dumolin	Quebec	2007-2010	0	5	0	0	0	4
Louis-Philippe Dumolin	Quebec	2009-2010	0	5	0	0	0	0
John Farano	Ontario	2010	0	4	0	0	0	1
John Ryan Fitzpatrick	Ontario	2007-2010	0	42	6	6	19	26
John Fletcher	Ontario	2007-2009	0	5	0	0	0	0
John Gaunt	Ontario	2007-2010	0	40	0	0	6	20
Peter Gibbons	Ontario	2007-2010	0	25	1	0	7	15
Brad Graham	Ontario	2007-2010	0	36	0	0	4	14
Jason Hathaway	Ontario	2007-2010	0	51	0	1	9	34
Joey Hansen	Netherlands	2009	0	13	0	0	0	4
D. J. Kennington	Ontario	2007-2010	1 _{(2010)}	51	8	9	35	41
Jeff Lapcevich	Ontario	2007-2010	0	29	0	0	4	16
Jim Lapcevich	Ontario	2007-2010	0	19	0	0	1	10
Nik Lapcevich	Ontario	2007-2009	0	6	0	0	0	1
Derek Lynch	Ontario	2007-2009	0	28	0	1	8	13
Peter Klutt	Ontario	2007-2008, 2010	0	19	0	0	1	10
Steve Mathews	Ontario	2009-2010	0	11	0	0	0	4
Joey McColm	Ontario	2007-2010	0	34	0	0	0	6
Robin Buck	Ontario	2007-2010	0	13	0	0	3	5
Bob Merrifield	Ontario	2007	0	6	0	0	0	0
Trevor Monaghan	Ontario	2007-2010	0	5	0	0	0	0
Kent Nuhn	Ontario	2007-2010	0	40	0	0	0	4
Andrew Ranger	Quebec	2007-2010	2 _{(2007, 2009)}	42	9	12	24	37
Trevor Seibert	British Columbia	2007-2010	0	19	0	0	3	6
Pete Shepherd III	Ontario	2008, 2010	0	9	0	1	4	7
Anthony Simone	Ontario	2008-2010	0	39	1	0	6	16
Dexter Stacey	Quebec	2009-2010	0	26	0	0	0	0
Scott Steckly	Ontario	2007-2010	1 _{(2008)}	51	3	8	29	35
Alex Tagliani	Quebec	2009-2010	0	13	2	1	2	3
Don Thomson Jr.	Ontario	2007-2010	0	51	11	6	27	38
David Thorndyke	Ontario	2007-2010	0	12	0	0	0	0
Ron Van Es	Ontario	2007	0	9	0	0	0	0
Jarrad Whisell	Alberta	2008-2010	0	13	0	0	0	2
Derek White	Quebec	2009-2010	0	16	0	0	0	1
Jason White	British Columbia	2007-2010	0	42	0	0	0	6
Dave Whitlock	Ontario	2007-2009	0	38	0	1	6	21
