= Heather Crowe =

Heather Crowe may refer to:

- Heather Crowe (activist) (1945–2006), Canadian anti-smoking campaigner
- Heather Crowe (tennis) (born 1961), American professional tennis player
