= Cale Gale =

American racing driver and crew chief

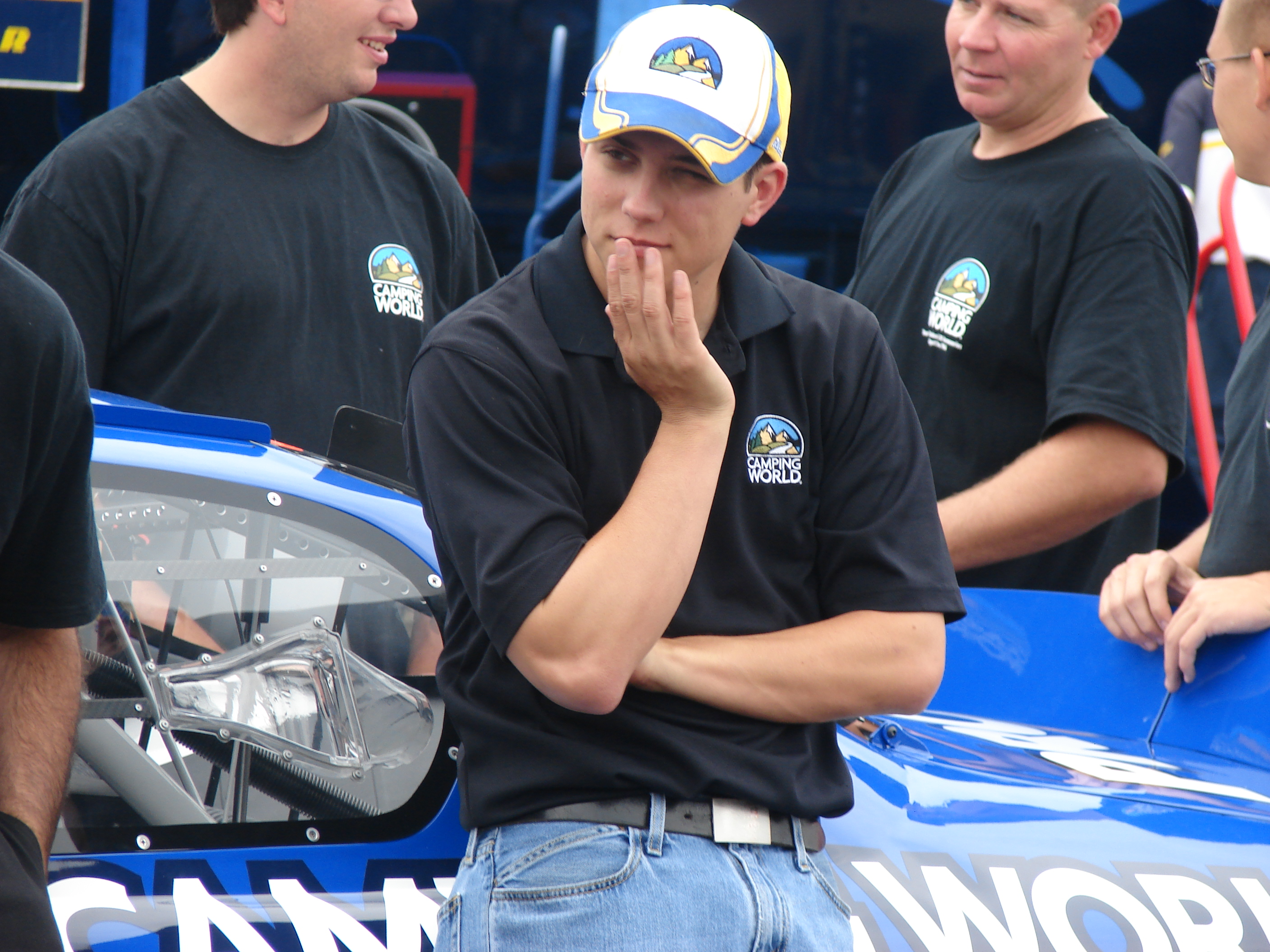
- Gale in 2008
- Born: March 5, 1985 (age 41); Mobile, Alabama, U.S.

NASCAR O'Reilly Auto Parts Series career
- 25 races run over 4 years
- 2009 position: 138th
- Best finish: 37th (2008)
- First race: 2006 Federated Auto Parts 300 (Nashville)
- Last race: 2009 Federated Auto Parts 300 (Nashville)
Wins	Top tens	Poles
0	3	1

NASCAR FedEx Freight Truck Series career
- 36 races run over 6 years
- 2017 position: 60th
- Best finish: 12th (2012)
- First race: 2007 Chevy Silverado HD 250 (Daytona)
- Last race: 2017 Texas Roadhouse 200 (Martinsville)
- First win: 2012 Ford EcoBoost 200 (Homestead)
Wins	Top tens	Poles
1	12	1

NASCAR Canada Series career
- 5 races run over 1 year
- Best finish: 22nd (2009)
- First race: 2009 Vortex Brake Pads 200 (Mosport)
- Last race: 2009 Z-Line Designs 250 (Kawartha)
Wins	Top tens	Poles
0	0	0
- Statistics up to date as of October 28, 2017.

Cale Kelly Gale (born March 5, 1985) is an American professional stock car racing driver and crew chief who works for ThorSport Racing as the crew chief of their No. 99 Ford F-150 in the NASCAR Craftsman Truck Series driven by Ben Rhodes. As a driver, he previously competed in the Truck Series (earning one win at Homestead-Miami Speedway in 2012), what is now the NASCAR O'Reilly Auto Parts Series and the ARCA Menards Series.

== Racing career ==
=== Karting ===
Gale's racing career began when his father placed him on a go-kart at the age of four. In 1989 at the age of five years, he began racing competitively at Mobile Motorsports Park in Kushla, Alabama, winning five features in his first year. The following season, Gale raced a full schedule, winning 25 feature races and the track championship.

In 1991, Gale started competing at tracks other than Mobile Motorsports Park, racing at three different go-kart facilities winning a total of 12 feature races. From 1992 through 1994, he went on the road watching his father, Bubba Gale, compete in the NASCAR All-Pro touring series. After a three-year break, Gale resumed his go-kart career at Gulf Oaks Speedway in Saucier, Mississippi, winning ten features, the track championship, and also capturing his first state championship. He won his second state championship the following year, and he won seven features at Gulf Oaks.

=== Modifieds, Late Models and Supertrucks ===
Gale spent 1997 and 1998 working on his Dad's crew at Mobile International Speedway. He raced in the limited modified division (an adult class) at J & J Speedway the following year, 14-year-old Gale won three feature races and received the Hardcharger Award.

In 2000, he began his full bodied car racing career at Mobile International Speedway in the pure stock division winning nine feature races, finishing third in the point standings, and capturing rookie of the year honors. Gale won 12 feature races and the super stock track championship in just his second year at the speedway. In his first late model race at MIS, he finished third in the 40-lap Lee Fields Memorial race. The same year, at the Snowball Derby in Pensacola, Florida, Gale was the fast qualifier in the super stock division in a field of 42 cars.

In the 2002 season, Gale competed in his first full year in the late model class. He was fast qualifier five times, winning four feature races. He is the only competitor in the 28 years of racing at MIS to ever capture rookie of the year honors and the late model track championship simultaneously. He competed in the Snowball Derby at Five Flags Speedway in Pensacola, Florida, Gale qualified seventh in the Snowflake Late Model event and finished 14th.

In Gale’s sophomore season, 2003, at MIS in the late model series, he won four feature races and finished second in the points race just 24 points out of another championship.

In 2004, competing in the Southern All Stars Supertruck Touring Series, Gale won two feature races and also broke two qualifying records at Sunny South Raceway in Grand Bay, Alabama and Lanier Speedway (Gainesville, Georgia). He also raced in the Snowflake 100 (Snowball Derby), qualified eighth and finished fifth in a 28 car field in a brand new late model.

In 2005, Gale ventured down to Lakeland for speed week in his Chevy truck and sat on the pole. He started there and led every lap to win against Matt Martin, son of Mark Martin, and Jamie Skinner, (son of Mike Skinner). Two weeks later at New Smyrna Speedway, Gale broke the track qualifying record, and also won again taking both Florida races against some very well known drivers. At Birmingham International Raceway, Gale added another track qualifying record to his resume, breaking the old mark held by Jeff Wainwright. Also on April 23, Gale broke the three-year-old track record at Mobile Speedway in the super late model series with the time of 16.920 sec. Around July, Gale seized the opportunity to move to Spartanburg, South Carolina as 2005 Snowball Derby winner Eddie Mercer presented Gale with the chance to be the shock specialist for Phoenix Racing, owned by James Finch of Panama City, Florida. Later in the year, Finch decided to give Gale a chance to do some testing in both his Busch and Nextel Cup car.

=== NASCAR and ARCA ===
==== 2006–2012 ====
The 2006 racing season started out the same way as 2005, Gale and his dad going to Lakeland in the truck and getting the same results. They made the trip to New Smyrna as well and produced the same results, a track record and a win two weeks later. Gale competed in his first ARCA Re/MAX Series race in April at Nashville Superspeedway driving the No. 09 Miccosukee Resort & Gaming Dodge Charger. He qualified ninth and finished sixth. In June, Finch decided to let Gale make his first NASCAR Busch Series debut at the same track as his ARCA race, Nashville Superspeedway. He qualified tenth and finished 20th in the No. 1 Miccosukee Charger. Gale's next race was another Busch Series event at Chicagoland Speedway in July. He had to compete against 21 Cup drivers. He qualified 39th and finished 37th with a faulty transmission. Gale had come in on lap 192, and he had worked his way up to sixth place. He went a lap down, only to get it back 67 laps later. When his transmission started giving him problems he was running ninth. Bobby Jones Racing decided to let Gale run his number in the Shop ‘n Save 150 ARCA race at Gateway International Raceway. Gale started the No. 50 Miccosukee Charger in the fourth starting spot. He never went any further back. Finch made the call to take on two tires on lap 77. Gale took the lead on lap 90, and what looked like would be a victory was delayed by four green-white-checkered restarts. He held off Steve Wallace for the victory.

Gale was signed to Kevin Harvick Incorporated's driver development program for the 2006, 2007 and 2008 seasons he has appeared in both NASCAR Nationwide Series and NASCAR Camping World Truck Series, as well as a handful of ARCA events for the team. He has 24 career Nationwide starts, three top-tens with a best finish of fourth in the 2008 Food City 250. He has made six truck starts with the best finish of ninth in the O'Reilly 200 in 2007. He also drove a limited schedule in the No. 11 in the NASCAR Canadian Tire Series in 2009.

Gale returned to KHI's Truck Series team in 2011, driving for six races with sponsorship from Rheem.

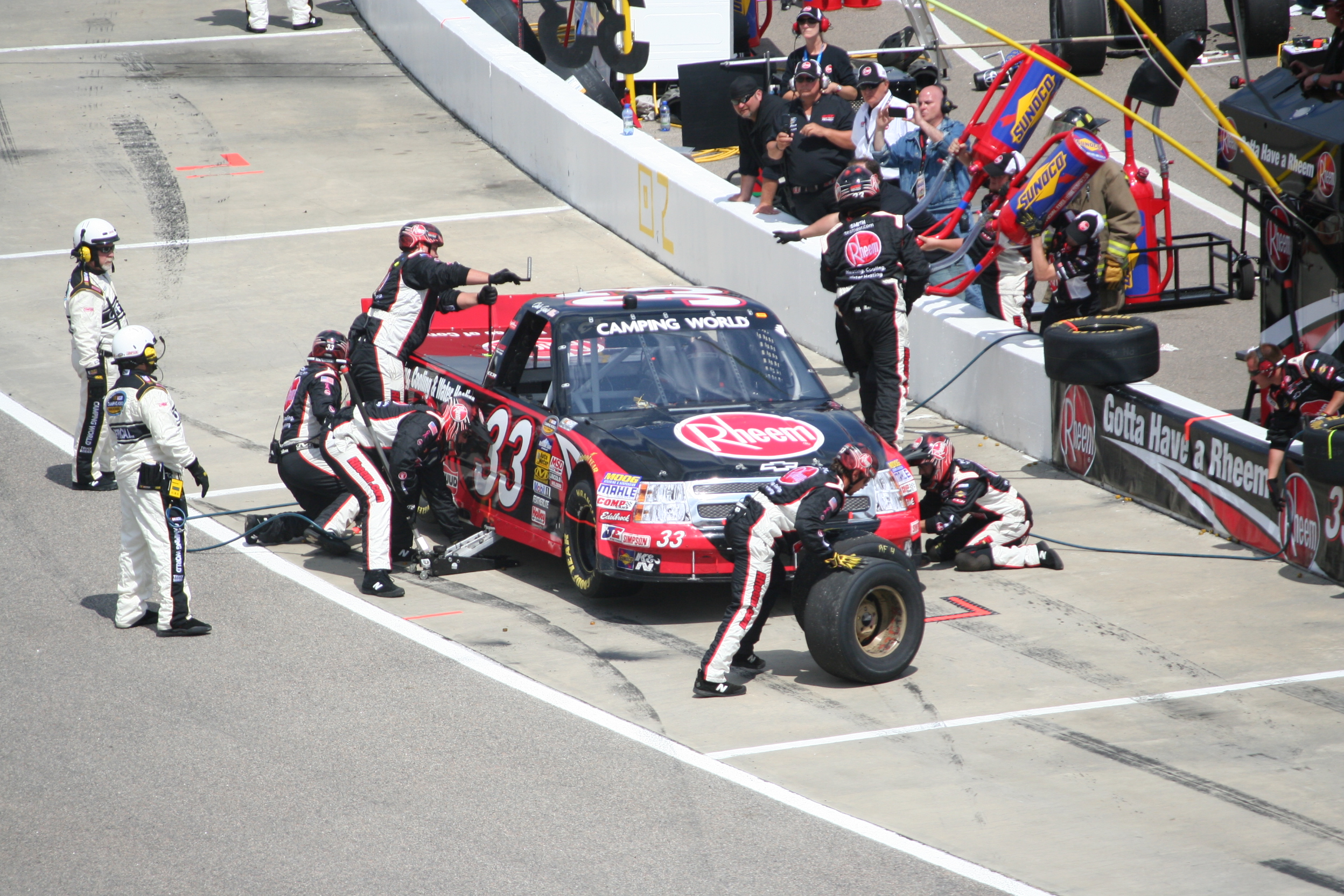
Gale making a pit stop in the Truck Series race at Rockingham in 2012

For 2012, Gale ran the full Camping World Truck Series season with Eddie Sharp Racing, driving the No. 33; in addition to competing for the series' Rookie of the Year title, he also competed in selected ARCA Racing Series events in the team's No. 6.

On November 16, 2012, Gale won his first Camping World Truck Series at the season finale Ford EcoBoost 200 in a thrilling finish, winning by .014 seconds. Gale failed to clear Kyle Busch coming out of turn 4 but pinned Busch against the outside wall from the turn to the finish line where the trucks separated finally.

==== 2013–2017 ====
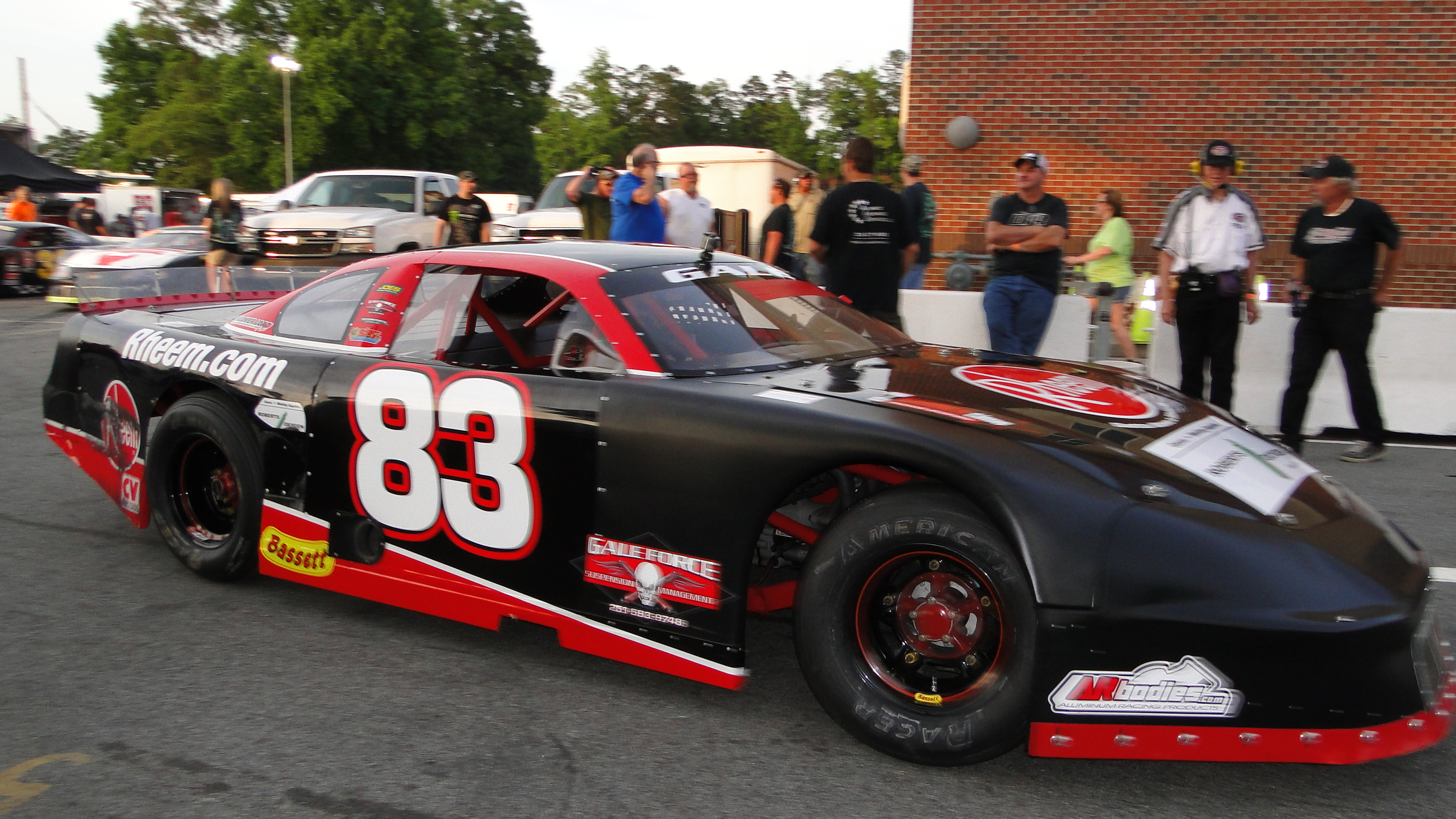
Gale in a late model race at Bowman Gray Stadium in 2013

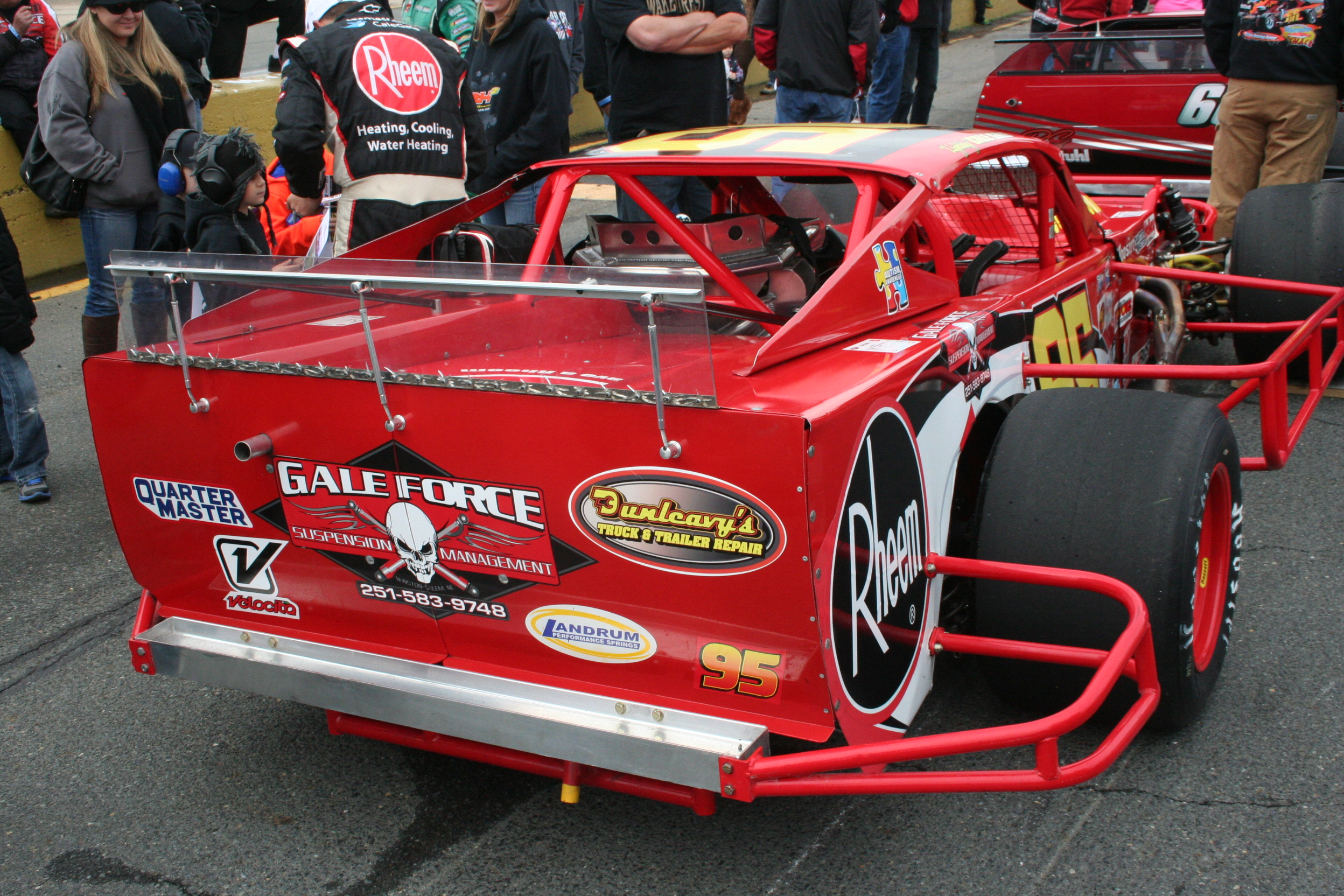
Gale's 2014 NASCAR Whelen Modified Tour car

For 2013, Gale joined Turner Scott Motorsports as crew chief for rookie driver Brandon Jones in the K&N Pro Series East; he returned to the racetrack as a driver in June at Kentucky Speedway in the Truck Series.

In 2014 and 2015, Gale competed part-time in the NASCAR Whelen Modified Tour.

In 2017, Gale ran his first Truck Series race since 2013 at Martinsville Speedway's Texas Roadhouse 200, driving the No. 99 Rheem-sponsored truck for MDM Motorsports.

==== 2022–present ====
In 2022, Gale ran one CARS Tour race.

Gale was set to compete full-time in the CARS Late Model Stock Tour in 2023 with Nelson Motorsports in their No. 22 car, but ended up only running the first three races of the season.

In 2026, Gale returned to crew chiefing with ThorSport Racing as Ben Rhodes' crew chief on their No. 99 truck starting at Darlington in March.

== Personal life ==
Cale is the son of late model driver Claude "Bubba" Gale Jr. His father named him Cale after NASCAR Hall of Famer Cale Yarborough as he was a big fan of his. His grandfather, Claude Gale Sr, served in the military.

Gale owns the shock manufacturer and consultant group Velocity Racing Suspensions, building shocks and consulting for different teams.

== Motorsports career results ==
=== NASCAR ===
(key) (Bold – Pole position awarded by qualifying time. Italics – Pole position earned by points standings or practice time. * – Most laps led.)

==== Nationwide Series ====
NASCAR Nationwide Series results
Year	Team	No.	Make	1	2	3	4	5	6	7	8	9	10	11	12	13	14	15	16	17	18	19	20	21	22	23	24	25	26	27	28	29	30	31	32	33	34	35	NNSC	Pts	Ref
2006	Phoenix Racing	1	Dodge	DAY	CAL	MXC	LVS	ATL	BRI	TEX	NSH	PHO	TAL	RCH	DAR	CLT	DOV	NSH; 20	KEN	MLW	DAY	CHI; 37	NHA	MAR	GTY	IRP	GLN	MCH; 34	BRI	CAL	RCH	DOV	KAN	CLT					81st	309	
2006	Kevin Harvick Incorporated	33	Chevy																																MEM; 25	TEX	PHO	HOM	81st	309	
2007	Kevin Harvick Incorporated	33	Chevy	DAY	CAL	MXC	LVS	ATL	BRI	NSH; 27	TEX	PHO	TAL	RCH	DAR	CLT	DOV	NSH; 26	KEN; 13	MLW; 23	NHA	DAY	CHI	GTY; 29	IRP; 14	CGV	GLN	MCH	BRI	CAL	RCH	DOV	KAN	CLT	MEM; 29	TEX	PHO	HOM	61st	658	
2008	Kevin Harvick Incorporated	77	Chevy	DAY; 23	CAL	LVS	ATL; 20	BRI								CLT; 30	DOV																						37th	1464	
2008	Kevin Harvick Incorporated	33	Chevy						NSH; 8	TEX	PHO	MXC	TAL; 22	RCH	DAR			NSH; 34	KEN; 18	MLW; 12	NHA	DAY	CHI	GTY; 12	IRP; 6	CGV	GLN	MCH; 19	**BRI**; 4	CAL	RCH	DOV	KAN	CLT	MEM; 11	TEX	PHO	HOM	37th	1464	
2009	Kevin Harvick Incorporated	33	Chevy	DAY	CAL	LVS	BRI	TEX	NSH	PHO	TAL	RCH	DAR	CLT	DOV	NSH; 31	KEN	MLW	NHA	DAY	CHI	GTY	IRP	IOW; QL^{†}	GLN	MCH	BRI	CGV	ATL	RCH	DOV	KAN	CAL	CLT	MEM	TEX	PHO	HOM	138th	70	
^{†} – Qualified for Kevin Harvick.

==== Camping World Truck Series ====
NASCAR Camping World Truck Series results
Year	Team	No.	Make	1	2	3	4	5	6	7	8	9	10	11	12	13	14	15	16	17	18	19	20	21	22	23	24	25	NCWTC	Pts	Ref
2007	Kevin Harvick Incorporated	2	Chevy	DAY; 14	CAL	ATL	MAR	KAN; 32	CLT	MFD	DOV	TEX	MCH	MLW	MEM	KEN	IRP; 24	NSH	BRI; 9	GTW	NHA	LVS	TAL; 22	MAR	ATL	TEX	PHO	HOM	45th	514	
2008	Kevin Harvick Incorporated	2	Chevy	DAY	CAL	ATL	MAR	KAN	CLT	MFD	DOV	TEX	MCH	MLW	MEM	KEN	IRP	NSH	BRI	GTW	NHA	LVS	TAL	MAR	ATL	TEX; 30	PHO	HOM	96th	73	
2011	Kevin Harvick Incorporated	2	Chevy	DAY	PHO	DAR	MAR	NSH; 29	DOV	CLT	KAN	TEX	KEN	IOW	NSH	IRP	POC	MCH	BRI	ATL	CHI	NHA							40th	105	
2011	Kevin Harvick Incorporated	33	Chevy																				KEN; 15	LVS; 20	TAL				40th	105	
2011	Kevin Harvick Incorporated	21	Chevy																							MAR; 7	TEX	HOM	40th	105	
2012	Eddie Sharp Racing	33	Chevy	DAY; 32	MAR; 15	CAR; 17	KAN; 11	CLT; 19	DOV; 5	TEX; 8	KEN; 25	IOW; 26	CHI; 6	POC; 14	MCH; 20	**BRI**; 28	ATL; 15	IOW; 5	KEN; 19	LVS; 7	TAL; 10	MAR; 35	TEX; 15	PHO; 7	HOM; 1				12th	634	
2013	Turner Scott Motorsports	30	Chevy	DAY	MAR	CAR	KAN	CLT	DOV	TEX	KEN; 13	IOW	ELD	POC	MCH	BRI	MSP	IOW	CHI	LVS	TAL	MAR	TEX						37th	103	
2013	Turner Scott Motorsports	33	Chevy																					PHO; 6	HOM; 10				37th	103	
2017	MDM Motorsports	99	Chevy	DAY	ATL	MAR	KAN	CLT	DOV	TEX	GTW	IOW	KEN	ELD	POC	MCH	BRI	MSP	CHI	NHA	LVS	TAL	MAR; 18	TEX	PHO	HOM			60th	20	

==== Whelen Southern Modified Tour ====
NASCAR Whelen Southern Modified Tour results
Year	Car owner	No.	Make	1	2	3	4	5	6	7	8	9	10	11	12	13	14	NSWMTC	Pts	Ref
2014	Bubba Gale	95	Chevy	CRW	SNM	SBO	LGY	CRW	BGS	BRI; 14	LGY	CRW	SBO	SNM	CRW	CRW	CLT	29th	30	
2015	Bubba Gale	95	Chevy	CRW	CRW	SBO	LGY	CRW	BGS	BRI; DNQ	LGY	SBO	CLT; 18					28th	26	

==== Canadian Tire Series ====
NASCAR Canadian Tire Series results
Year	Team	No.	Make	1	2	3	4	5	6	7	8	9	10	11	12	13	Rank	Pts	Ref
2009	Farwell Racing Inc.	13	Chevy	ASE	DEL	MOS	ASE	MPS	EDM	SAS	MOS; 14	CTR; 11	MTL; 11	BAR; 19	RIS	KWA; 26	22nd	572	

=== ARCA Racing Series ===
(key) (Bold – Pole position awarded by qualifying time. Italics – Pole position earned by points standings or practice time. * – Most laps led.)

ARCA Racing Series results
Year	Team	No.	Make	1	2	3	4	5	6	7	8	9	10	11	12	13	14	15	16	17	18	19	20	21	22	23	ARSC	Pts	Ref
2006	Phoenix Racing	09	Dodge	DAY	NSH; 6	SLM	WIN	KEN	TOL	POC	MCH	KAN	KEN	BLN	POC												57th	630	
2006	Bobby Jones Racing	50	Dodge													GTW; 1	NSH	MCH; 6	ISF	MIL	TOL	DSF	CHI	SLM	TAL	IOW	57th	630	
2007	Kevin Harvick Incorporated	33	Chevy	DAY	USA	**NSH**; 3*	SLM	KAN	WIN	KEN	TOL	IOW	POC	MCH	BLN	KEN; 2	POC	NSH; 4	ISF	MIL	GTW	DSF	CHI	SLM	TAL	TOL	48th	680	
2011	Kevin Harvick Incorporated	33	Chevy	DAY	TAL	SLM	TOL	NJE	CHI	POC	**MCH**; 19*	WIN	BLN	IOW; 2	IRP	POC	ISF	MAD	DSF	SLM	KAN; 5	TOL					39th	595	
2012	Eddie Sharp Racing	6	Chevy	DAY; 13																							54th	405	
2012	Eddie Sharp Racing	33	Chevy		MOB; 1*	SLM	TAL	TOL	ELK	POC	MCH	WIN	NJE	IOW	CHI	IRP	POC	BLN	ISF	MAD	SLM	DSF	KAN				54th	405	

=== CARS Late Model Stock Car Tour ===
(key) (Bold – Pole position awarded by qualifying time. Italics – Pole position earned by points standings or practice time. * – Most laps led. ** – All laps led.)

CARS Late Model Stock Car Tour results
Year	Team	No.	Make	1	2	3	4	5	6	7	8	9	10	11	12	13	14	15	16	CLMSCTC	Pts	Ref
2023	Nelson Motorsports	22	Toyota	SNM; 19	FLC; 24	HCY; DNQ	ACE	NWS	LGY	DOM	CRW	HCY	ACE	TCM	WKS	AAS	SBO	TCM	CRW	47th	24	

=== CARS Pro Late Model Tour ===
(key)

CARS Pro Late Model Tour results
Year	Team	No.	Make	1	2	3	4	5	6	7	8	9	10	11	12	CPLMTC	Pts	Ref
2022	N/A	24C	Chevy	CRW	HCY	GPS	FCS; 3	TCM	HCY	ACE	MMS	TCM	ACE	SBO	CRW	32nd	30	

^{*} Season still in progress
^{1} Ineligible for series points
