= Joey Hanssen =

Dutch racing driver (born 1991)

- Nationality: (Netherlands) Dutch
- Born: 1 July 1991 (age 35) Venray, Netherlands

Karting KZ2 career
- Current team: Hanssen Motorsport
- Car number: 201
- Engine: TM Racing
- Championships: 12 [[Maxxis cup Champion 2003, 2004, 2005 - World cup KZ2 2011 - Australian Cik Stars OF Karting Champion 2013,2014 - Dutch Chrono Champion 2017,2018,2019 Formula Gloria Dutch Champion 2007 - Formula Gloria Eurocup winner 2007 - Formula Toyota Eurocup Winner 2011]]

Previous series
- 1997-2008 2007 2007-2008 2008 2009 2010-present: Karting; Formula Azzurra; BRL Light; Formula Gloria; Dutch Formula Ford Zetec; BRL V6; NASCAR Canadian Tire Series; Karting

Championship titles
- 2007: Formula Gloria

Awards
- 2009: NASCAR Canadian Tire Series Rookie of the Year
- Statistics up to date as of August 3, 2013.

NASCAR Canada Series career
- 13 races run over 1 year
- Car no., team: No. 40 (DJK Racing)
- Best finish: 8
- First race: 2009 Tufoil 250
- Last race: 2009 Z-Line Designs 250
Wins	Top tens	Poles
0	4	0
- Statistics up to date as of 3 August 2013.

Joey Hanssen (Venray, 1 July 1991) is a Dutch racing driver. He currently races in the CIK Stars of Karting Series in the KZ2 class.

== Career history ==
=== Karting ===
Hanssen started kart racing competitively in 1997. He raced under the NAB-NFK sanctioning body, which then organized the official Dutch karting championships. He won his first title in 2003 in the Junior ICA class. In the Dutch championship Junior ICA, he finished second. At 15 years old, he stepped over to the shifter karts. Until 2008, he had raced mainly in the Netherlands. In 2008, Hannsen would compete in the DSKM in Germany. He also competed in the WSK International Series and the European championship KZ2. This resulted in a tenth place in the DSKM, a twelfth place in the WSK International Series and a sixth place at the European championship.

=== Auto racing ===
In 2007, Hannsen made his debut in formula racing. The Formula Gloria was an amateur spec racing class, it is based on the Formula Azzurra. Hannsen finished second in the first race and won the second race. Eventually, Hannsen went on to win six out of nine races and securing the championship. As a reward for winning the championship, Hanssen competed in two races of the Formula Azzurra championship at the Autodromo Nazionale Monza. He finished fourth in the first race and seventh in the second race.

Hannsen also made his touring car racing debut in 2007, in the BRL Light. The first race for Hannsen was at the TT Circuit Assen halfway through the season. The BRL Light held two support races during 2007 Bavaria Champ Car Grand Prix weekend. Hannsen won the second race for a crowd of 61,200 fans. For 2008, Hannsen failed to secure a full-time race seat. Instead he focused on karting. He raced one race weekend in the Dutch Formula Ford 1800 winning both races. Hannsen also focused on 2009 for which he secured a full-time race seat in the NASCAR Canadian Tire Series. His seat was funded by lifelong sponsor Primechamp, one of the largest producers of mushrooms in the Netherlands.

In 2009, Hannsen raced a Dodge Avenger for DJK Racing. He made his oval debut at Autodrome St. Eustache where he finished fifteenth and was the last car running. He achieved his best result at Barrie Speedway he started the race nineteenth but finished in eighth position. Whole season long fellow rookie Dexter Stacey was his main rival fighting for top rookie honors. By finishing way in front of Stacey in the final round at Kawartha Speedway, Hanssen secured the rookie title. Hanssen finished thirteenth in the final standings just in front of Stacey who was fourteenth.

=== Return to kartracing ===
After failing to secure an autoracing seat for 2010, Hannsen returned to kartracing halfway through the season. He drove in the KZ2 class in a Lenzo Kart. The following year, 2011, Hanssen was signed by the Lenzo Kart factory team Luxor Racing Team. His biggest achievement was to win the CIK-FIA World Cup for KZ2. In 2012 Joey returned to the DSKM championship securing a fourth place in the championship. Driving for Lenzo Kart Australia, Hannsen moved to Australia to race in the CIK Stars of Karting Series in the KZ2 class. He won the 2013 Stars of Karting in 2013 and 2014 with the famous CRG-Shamick racing Team. Hanssen moved back to the Netherlands, where he continued stacking up championships. He won the 2017, 2018 and 2019 Dutch KZ2 Championship with his home build engines. Hanssen retired at the end of the 2019 season and started his own kart team specialized in KZ.

== Motorsports career results ==
=== NASCAR ===
(key) (Bold – Pole position awarded by qualifying time. Italics – Pole position earned by points standings or practice time. * – Most laps led.)

==== Canadian Tire Series ====
NASCAR Canadian Tire Series results
Year	Team	No.	Make	1	2	3	4	5	6	7	8	9	10	11	12	13	NCTSC	Pts	Ref
2009	DJK Racing	40	Dodge	ASE; 15	DEL; 14	MSP; 23	ASE; 10	MPS; 15	EDM; 9	SAS; 19	MSP; 21	CTR; 9	CGV; 29	BAR; 8	RIS; 14	KWA; 11	13th	1536	

Awards and achievements
Preceded by Jason White	NASCAR Canadian Tire Series Rookie of the Year; 2009	Succeeded by Derek White
