= 2009 NASCAR Canadian Tire Series =

Seasons
- ← 2008 2010 →

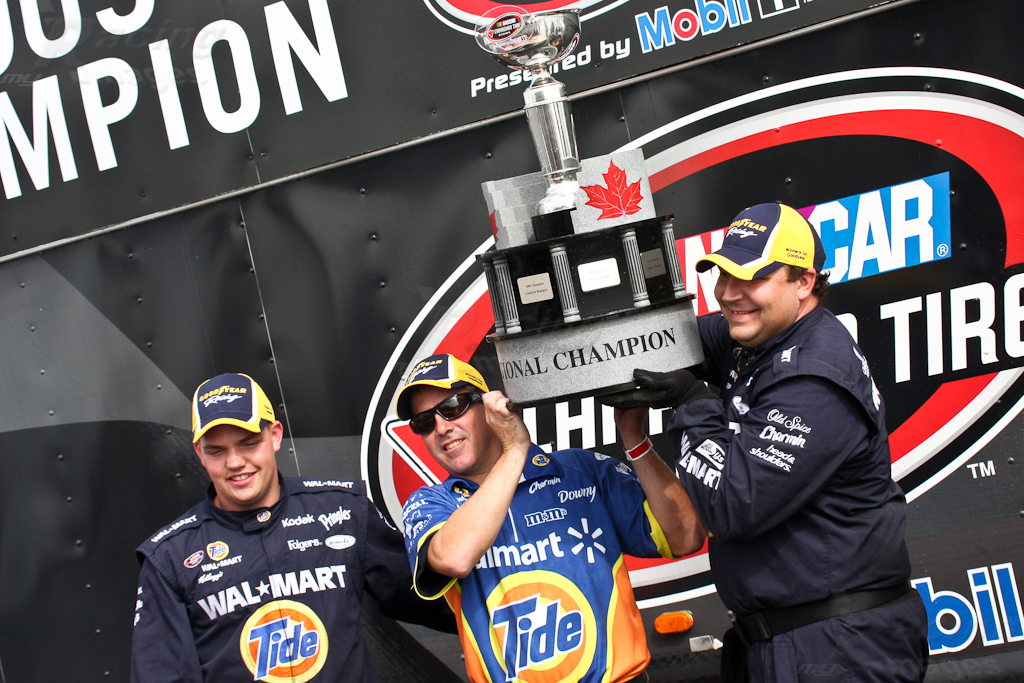
Andrew Ranger, the 2009 champion.

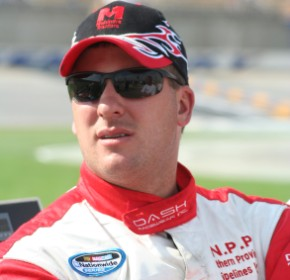
D. J. Kennington finished runner up in points.

The 2009 NASCAR Canadian Tire Series was the third racing season since the buy out of the CASCAR Super Series.

== Highlights ==
The 2009 calendar is highlighted with a race added to Saskatchewan at the Auto Clearing Motor Speedway, a return to Delaware Speedway and the dates at Cayuga, Ontario removed. Important car changes are Joey Hanssen came from the Netherlands to run a second D. J. Kennington's car, J. R. Fitzpatrick has graduated to NASCAR Camping World Truck Series and will only run part-time and as well as American NASCAR star Cale Gale will run a couple of races. Again all of the races will air on TSN on tape delay. The 2009 season will be David Whitlock's last season as he started it off great with a win in Quebec. Formula One driver Jacques Villeneuve made his series debut in the Tide 250 (4th race of the year) finishing last after wrecking out on the 1st lap where Scott Steckly went to victory lane. During the western road swing of races Andrew Ranger won two of the three taking the points lead with Steckly picking up the 3rd and the first ever race in Saskatchewan. Ranger then went on to win the next two races. Montreal is the most famed race, as it is paired with the NASCAR Nationwide Series. An eventful last lap ended with Scott Steckly on his roof and . R. Fitzpatrick picking up his first win of the season. At the end of the season Don Thomson Jr. finally won after a disappointing first half of the year at Barrie Speedway. Andrew Ranger ended up getting his 6th win of 13 and locking up the championship with a win at Riverside Speedway on September 20, 2009. The final weekend of racing took place at Kawartha Speedway where D. J. Kennington picked up his second win of the season. The race was delayed many times and was run on Sunday instead of Saturday due to rain. Andrew Ranger won his second championship in three years with the biggest points margin in series history. He will be eligible for the Toyota All-Star Shootout in January, looking to expand his NASCAR career to the next level. The 2009 Rookie of the year was Joey Hanssen, who beat out Dexter Stacey.

== Teams and drivers ==
Team	Car	Number	Driver
Erb Racing	Dodge Charger	22	Scott Steckly
Champion Racing	Chevrolet Monte Carlo	13	Cale Gale
White Racing	Chevrolet Monte Carlo	21	Jason White
Fitzpatrick Motorsports	Chevrolet Monte Carlo	4	Don Thomson Jr.
Fitzpatrick Motorsports	Chevrolet Monte Carlo	84	J. R. Fitzpatrick
Jacombs Racing	Ford Fusion	27	Andrew Ranger
DJK Racing	Ford Fusion	17	D. J. Kennington
DJK Racing	Ford Fusion	40	Joey Hanssen
WJS Motorsports	Pontiac	55	Dexter Stacey
Jacombs Racing	Ford Fusion	7	Jacques Villeneuve
Micks Motorsports	Ford Fusion	2	Kerry Micks
Whitlock Motorsports	Dodge Avenger	9	Mark Dilley
Team3Red Racing	Dodge Intrepid	3	Jason Hathaway
Brad Graham Racing	Dodge Avenger	19	Brad Graham
Whitlock Motorsports	Dodge Avenger	39	Dave Whitlock
Whitlock Motorsports	Dodge Avenger	29	Pierre Bourque
Unknown	Chevrolet Monte Carlo	5	Andre Coursol
Team Race Sportz	Dodge Charger	82	Dave Connelly
Fastline Motorsports	Chevrolet Monte Carlo	23	Jeff Lapcevich
Fastline Motorsports	Chevrolet Monte Carlo	25	Jim Lapcevich
Simone Autosport	Chevrolet Monte Carlo	95	Anthony Simone
Beauchamp Motorsports	Dodge Avenger	60	Ron Beauchamp Jr.
Unknown	Dodge Avenger	12	John Gaunt
Nuhn Motorsports	Chevrolet Monte Carlo	18	Kent Nuhn

== Schedule and results ==
Date	Event	Track	Location	Pole winner	Race winner
May 23	Tufoil 250	Autodrome Saint-Eustache	Saint-Eustache, QC	Scott Steckly	Dave Whitlock
June 6	Delaware 200	Delaware Speedway	Delaware, ON	Mark Dilley	D. J. Kennington
June 14	Dickies 200	Mosport International Raceway	Bowmanville, ON	Andrew Ranger	Andrew Ranger
July 11 **	Tide 250	Autodrome Saint-Eustache	Saint-Eustache, QC	D. J. Kennington	Scott Steckly
July 18	A&W 300	SunValley Speedway	Vernon, BC	Ron Beauchamp Jr.	Andrew Ranger
July 25	Canadian Tire 100	Rexall Edmonton Indy	Edmonton, AB	Andrew Ranger	Andrew Ranger
July 29	Velocity Prairie Thunder	Auto Clearing Motor Speedway	Saskatoon, SK	Don Thomson Jr.	Scott Steckly
August 8	Vortex Brake Pads 200	Mosport International Raceway	Bowmanville, ON	Don Thomson Jr.	Andrew Ranger
August 16	GP3R 100	Circuit Trois-Rivières	Trois-Rivières, QC	Alex Tagliani	Andrew Ranger
August 30	NAPA Autopro 100	Circuit Gilles Villeneuve	Montreal, QC	Alex Tagliani	J. R. Fitzpatrick
September 12	Torbram Electric 300	Barrie Speedway	Barrie, ON	Anthony Simone	Don Thomson Jr.
September 19	Komatsu 300	Riverside Speedway	Antigonish, NS	D. J. Kennington	Andrew Ranger
September 26**	Z-Line Designs 250 presented by Dodge Dealers and Coke	Kawartha Speedway	Fraserville, ON	Ron Beauchamp Jr.	D. J. Kennington

- * - Set by owners points
  ** - Race was rained out, ran the next day.

== Points standings ==
=== Driver standings ===
The top 10

Position	Driver	Points	Starts	Wins	Top 5s	Top 10s	Winnings ($)
1	Andrew Ranger	2190	13	6	8	13	87,100
2	D. J. Kennington	2023	13	2	9	10	72,275
3	Ron Beauchamp Jr.	2023	13	0	8	11	64,000
4	Scott Steckly	1953	13	2	9	9	69,000
5	Kerry Micks	1942	13	0	5	11	44,850
6	Don Thomson Jr.	1841	13	1	5	9	39,950
7	Jason Hathaway	1819	13	0	2	10	37,830
8	Anthony Simone	1800	13	0	4	8	38,700
9	Mark Dilley	1767	13	0	4	6	39,000
10	Dave Whitlock	1746	13	1	2	8	42,600

== See also ==
- 2009 NASCAR Sprint Cup Series
- 2009 NASCAR Nationwide Series
- 2009 NASCAR Camping World Truck Series
- 2009 NASCAR Camping World East Series
- 2009 NASCAR Camping World West Series
- 2009 ARCA Re/Max Series
- 2009 NASCAR Whelen Modified Tour
- 2009 NASCAR Whelen Southern Modified Tour
- 2009 NASCAR Corona Series
- 2009 NASCAR Mini Stock Series
