= Michel Vennat =

Canadian civil servant

- Born: September 17, 1941 (age 84); Montreal, Quebec, Canada
- Education: Collège Jean-de-Brébeuf; Université de Montréal; Merton College, Oxford
- Occupations: civil servant, lawyer, businessman
- Spouse: Marie Anne Tawil

Joseph André Michel Vennat OC KC (born September 17, 1941) is a Canadian civil servant, lawyer, businessman, and former President of the Business Development Bank of Canada. He was fired due to the investigation of the 2004 Canadian sponsorship scandal. In August 2006, Federal Courts deemed his firing illegal and, had his term not expired since his dismissal, he would have been reinstated to office.

Born in Montreal, Quebec, he received a Bachelor of Arts degree from Collège Jean-de-Brébeuf in 1960 and a Bachelor of Civil Law from the Université de Montréal in 1963. As a Rhodes Scholar he received a Master of Arts from Merton College, Oxford in 1965. He was created a Queen's Counsel in 1983.

In 1965, he joined External Affairs and from 1966 to 1968 was the Special Assistant to the Minister of Finance, Mitchell Sharp. From 1968 to 1970, he was the Special Assistant to Prime Minister Pierre Trudeau. In 1970, he joined the Montreal offices of the law firm Stikeman Elliott, becoming a senior partner before leaving in 1990. From 1976 to 1981, he was a member of the Board and Chairman of the Canadian Film Development Corporation.

In 1991, he was appointed CEO of Westburne Inc. and became CEO of United Westburne Inc. in 1993. From 1994 to 1996, he was the Chairman of the Council for Canadian Unity. In 1998, he was appointed chairman of the Business Development Bank of Canada and served as president and CEO from 2000 until he was fired in 2004. The Federal Court ruled that Michel Vennat had been illegally fired from the BDC in August 2006. Had his term not expired, he would have been reinstated.

In 1995, he was made an Officer of the Order of Canada.
