= Beach Travellers =

Vancouver-based tour operator

- Type: Adventure Travel
- Industry: Tourism; Tour operator
- Founded: 2004; 22 years ago
- Founder: Paul Barker; TJ Hermiston
- Headquarters: Vancouver, British Columbia, Canada
- Products: Adventure travel and Surf Camps
- Revenue: $5.5 million
- Owner: Paul Barker; TJ Hermiston
- Number of employees: 42
- Website: www.beachtravellers.com

Beach Travellers is a Vancouver-based tour operator that specializes in adventure travel. The company hosts over 40 annual trips ranging from 12 to 40 days in five countries; Bali, Indonesia, Cambodia, Brazil, Costa Rica, and Thailand. The company's target market is Canadian youth.

== History ==
In March 2004, G Barker and TJ Hermiston launched the company with their savings. To promote their company, they drove across Canada for three months, stopping at Canadian universities to set up information booths. The first tour included 15 participants and was in Thailand.
