= Dar Heatherington =

Canadian politician

Darlene "Dar" Heatherington (born 1963) is a former Canadian politician who was forced to resign her city council seat in Lethbridge, Alberta in 2004 after being convicted of public mischief.

== Reports ==
On May 3, 2003, Heatherington first made Canadian and international headlines when she disappeared from a conference in Great Falls, Montana. Three days later, she was found in Las Vegas, Nevada, alleging that she had been abducted and raped. Police found her report to be inconsistent and lacking evidence, and she eventually recanted. She was charged with filing a false report to police but pleaded not guilty. She continues to allege that the incident happened as reported and that the police coerced her into recanting her original statement.

Previously, Heatherington had filed reports with Lethbridge police that she was being stalked. She was receiving sexually explicit letters from her stalker, but her reports often did not match police surveillance evidence. On June 10, 2003, she was charged with public mischief after police concluded that the stalker did not exist and that Heatherington was likely writing the letters herself. On September 8, she pleaded not guilty to those charges as well.

== Charges and sentencing ==
On June 29, 2004, Heatherington was found guilty of public mischief. Although required by law to resign her council seat following her conviction, Heatherington initially refused to do so. As a result, Lethbridge city council initiated the process of having her removed through the Alberta Court of Queen's Bench. On August 9, 2004, Heatherington announced her resignation effective September 10, indicating that she would be using her time to prove her innocence. Two days later, Lethbridge City Council was able to force Heatherington to resign immediately.

On September 10, Heatherington received a 20-month conditional sentence, consisting of eight months of house arrest followed by 10 months of curfew, and 100 hours of community service and counselling.

== Post-trial ==
On February 3, 2005, Heatherington was found guilty of violating the terms of her house arrest sentence, although this conviction did not result in any jail time.

On July 27, Heatherington and her husband filed separately for bankruptcy, both citing Heatherington's ongoing legal battle. On August 16, Heatherington dropped her appeal of the mischief charge. Her lawyer stated that Heatherington could no longer afford to proceed, despite earlier claims that the bankruptcy would not affect her appeal.

On November 15, 2005, Heatherington's sentence was reduced to one year from twenty months, by order of the Alberta Court of Appeal.
