= Barb Tarbox =

Canadian anti-smoking activist (1961–2003)

- Barb Tarbox on a Canadian cigarette box
- Born: April 10, 1961; Edmonton, Alberta, Canada
- Died: May 18, 2003 (aged 42); Edmonton, Alberta, Canada

Barb Tarbox, MSM (April 10, 1961 – May 18, 2003) was a Canadian anti-smoking activist. A lifelong smoker dying of lung and brain cancer, she openly discussed her illness, its cause and its consequences, which propelled her to prominence.

In high school, between the ages of 14 and 16, she was a model for fashion companies and joined many athletics in her school. When she was eleven, Tarbox began smoking in an attempt to fit in with the popular kids (who smoked). During the last months of her life she went around Canada teaching young adults about the consequences of smoking and what it looks like to be a smoker. She emphasized how she was unable to quit smoking even after her cancer diagnosis.

Tarbox died at a hospital in Edmonton on May 18, 2003, at the age of 42 from brain cancer and lung cancer.

On December 5, 2003, Barb Tarbox was posthumously awarded the Meritorious Service Medal by Adrienne Clarkson, Governor General of Canada, for devotion to the anti-smoking cause. The decoration was accepted in Ottawa by her daughter, Mackenzie.

On December 30, 2010, the Government of Canada unveiled tougher anti-smoking images on their cigarette packaging including two images that feature Barb Tarbox during her last days.

== See also ==
- Heather Crowe (activist)
