= Roslyn Schwartz =

British writer and animator (born 1951)

- Born: 29 September 1951 (age 73); Montreal, Quebec, Canada
- Occupation: Author
- Genre: Children's literature

Roslyn Schwartz (born 29 September 1951) is a Canadian children's author and animator.

Born in Montreal, Quebec, she was raised in Tunbridge Wells, Kent, England. Schwartz is the author of The Mole Sisters series, The Smoker's Addictionary (1985), Rose and Dorothy (1981), and Tales from Parc la Fontaine (2006). The Mole Sisters was made into a T.V. cartoon series.

She also created two short animated films with the National Film Board of Canada, I'm your Man and The Arkelope.

Schwartz credits much of her success to her younger brother Mark, creator of the traditional winter Poutinikkah festival in Quebec.
