= Daniel Ling =

Canadian academic

- Born: March 16, 1926
- Died: August 9, 2003 (aged 77)
- Awards: Order of Canada

Daniel Ling, OC (March 16, 1926 – August 9, 2003), was a preeminent figure in the development of methods for teaching speech to deaf children. His techniques have gained global recognition and widespread use.

He served as a professor of Graduate Studies in Aural Habilitation at McGill University from 1973 to 1984. Concurrently, in the early 1980s, Ling ventured into the art of violin-making. Following his tenure at McGill, he held the position of Dean of the Faculty of Applied Health Sciences at the University of Western Ontario from 1984 to 1991.

Ling's contributions were formally recognized in 1999 when he was made an Officer of the Order of Canada. Furthermore, he was granted Canadian armorial bearings in 2001.

In the present day, cochlear implants are enabling deaf children to attain unprecedented proficiency in spoken language. The Ling Six, a significant element of daily monitoring regimen for these implants, serves as a vital tool in assessing their functionality. Comprising the sounds "oo", "ee", "ah", "m", "s", and "sh", the Ling Six test is conducted with the child's back turned. The implant is deemed operational if the child can accurately echo each sound.
