= Kevin Bennett =

English boxer (born 1975)

Personal information
- Nickname: Bulldog
- Nationality: English
- Born: 15 August 1975 (age 51) Birmingham, England
- Weight: light/light welter/welter/light middleweight

Boxing career
- Stance: Orthodox

Boxing record
- Total fights: 22
- Wins: 17 (KO 7)
- Losses: 5 (KO 3)

Kevin "Bulldog" Bennett (born 15 August 1975, in Birmingham) is an English professional light/light welter/welter/light middleweight boxer of the 1990s and 2000s, who as an amateur won the 1999 Amateur Boxing Association of England light welterweight (64 kg) title, against Daniel Happe (Repton ABC), boxing out of Hartlepool Boys ABC, and as a professional won the Commonwealth lightweight title, and was a challenger for the International Boxing Organization (IBO) lightweight title against Jason Cook, and British Boxing Board of Control (BBBofC) lightweight title against Graham Earl, his professional fighting weight varied from 134 lb (61 kg; 9 st 8 lb), i.e. lightweight to 150 lb (68 kg; 10 st 10 lb), i.e. light middleweight.
