= Dexter Stacey =

Canadian racing driver (born 1992)

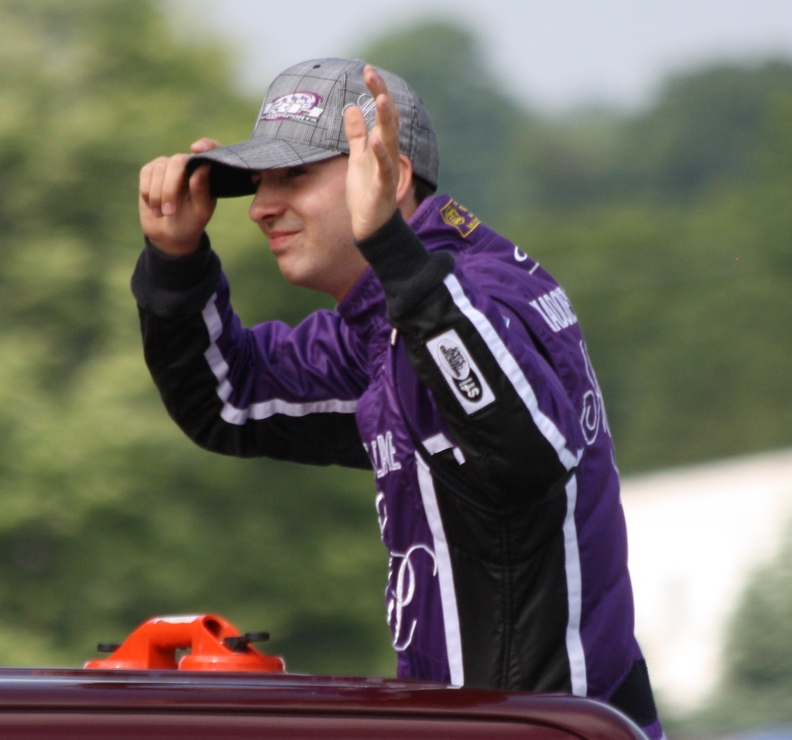
- Stacey at Road America in 2013
- Born: November 9, 1992 (age 34); Kahnawake, Quebec, Canada

NASCAR O'Reilly Auto Parts Series career
- 27 races run over 4 years
- 2023 position: 60th
- Best finish: 30th (2013)
- First race: 2012 Zippo 200 at the Glen (Watkins Glen)
- Last race: 2023 Ag-Pro 300 (Talladega)
Wins	Top tens	Poles
0	0	0

NASCAR FedEx Freight Truck Series career
- 2 races run over 1 year
- 2015 position: 56th
- Best finish: 56th (2015)
- First race: 2015 WinStar World Casino & Resort 350 (Texas)
- Last race: 2015 Ford EcoBoost 200 (Homestead)
Wins	Top tens	Poles
0	0	0

NASCAR Canada Series career
- 98 races run over 13 years
- Car no., team: No. 8 (Ed Hakonson Racing); No. 28 (DJK Racing)
- 2026 position: 36th
- Best finish: 9th (2020, 2021)
- First race: 2009 Tufoil 250 (Saint-Eustache)
- Last race: 2026 NAPA 150 (Calabogie)
Wins	Top tens	Poles
0	26	0
- Statistics up to date as of September 13, 2026.

Dexter Stacey (born November 9, 1992) is a Canadian professional stock car racing driver who competes part-time in the NASCAR Canada Series, driving the No. 8 Chevrolet for Ed Hakonson Racing and the No. 28 Dodge for DJK Racing. He has also previously competed in the NASCAR Xfinity Series, NASCAR Camping World Truck Series, and the ARCA Menards Series.

Stacey became the youngest driver to ever race in the Canada Series at the age of sixteen in 2009 when it was known as the NASCAR Canadian Tire Series.

== Racing career ==
=== Early career ===
Stacey began racing in go karts at the age of four. He then moved up to race in dirt modifieds at the age of eight running well in several races. He also competed in various ice racing events in his early teens winning a few races throughout his five-year span in that discipline.

=== NASCAR ===
==== Pinty's Series ====
Stacey made his NASCAR debut on May 23, 2009, in the season opening NASCAR Canadian Tire Series race at Saint-Eustache at sixteen, becoming the youngest driver to race in the series and the youngest driver to race in NASCAR until his mark was eclipsed in 2011 when NASCAR lowered the age limit to fifteen. He contended for Rookie of the Year honors against Joey Hanssen, finishing second in the rookie points. Stacey found very little success in his first year with his underfunded WJS Motorsports team, with no top-tens and finishing 14th in the points.

In 2010, Stacey returned to the Canadian Tire series with sponsorship from Bully's Truck Stop. Stacey was fairly better that year than last year, finishing in the top-ten in points in tenth despite not having any top-tens once again.

In 2011, Stacey would have a career season in the Canadian Tire series. Stacey earned his first career top-ten in the fourth race of the season in Mosport, finishing seventh. Stacey went on to score four more solid top-15 finishes and despite still not leading a lap, he finished tenth in the points for the second year in row.

In 2012, Stacey made an attempt to run the full schedule in the NASCAR Canadian Tire series, but he and his team had a severe amount of financial issues that year. He and the team was only able to manage enough sponsorship to run five of the twelve races that year. However, in his next to last run of the season, Stacey earned a career best fifth-place finish at Barrie Speedway in Ontario, his first and only career top-five finish. Other than that, it was a dismal season for Stacey and WJS Motorsports as they finished 30th in the points.

==== Xfinity Series ====
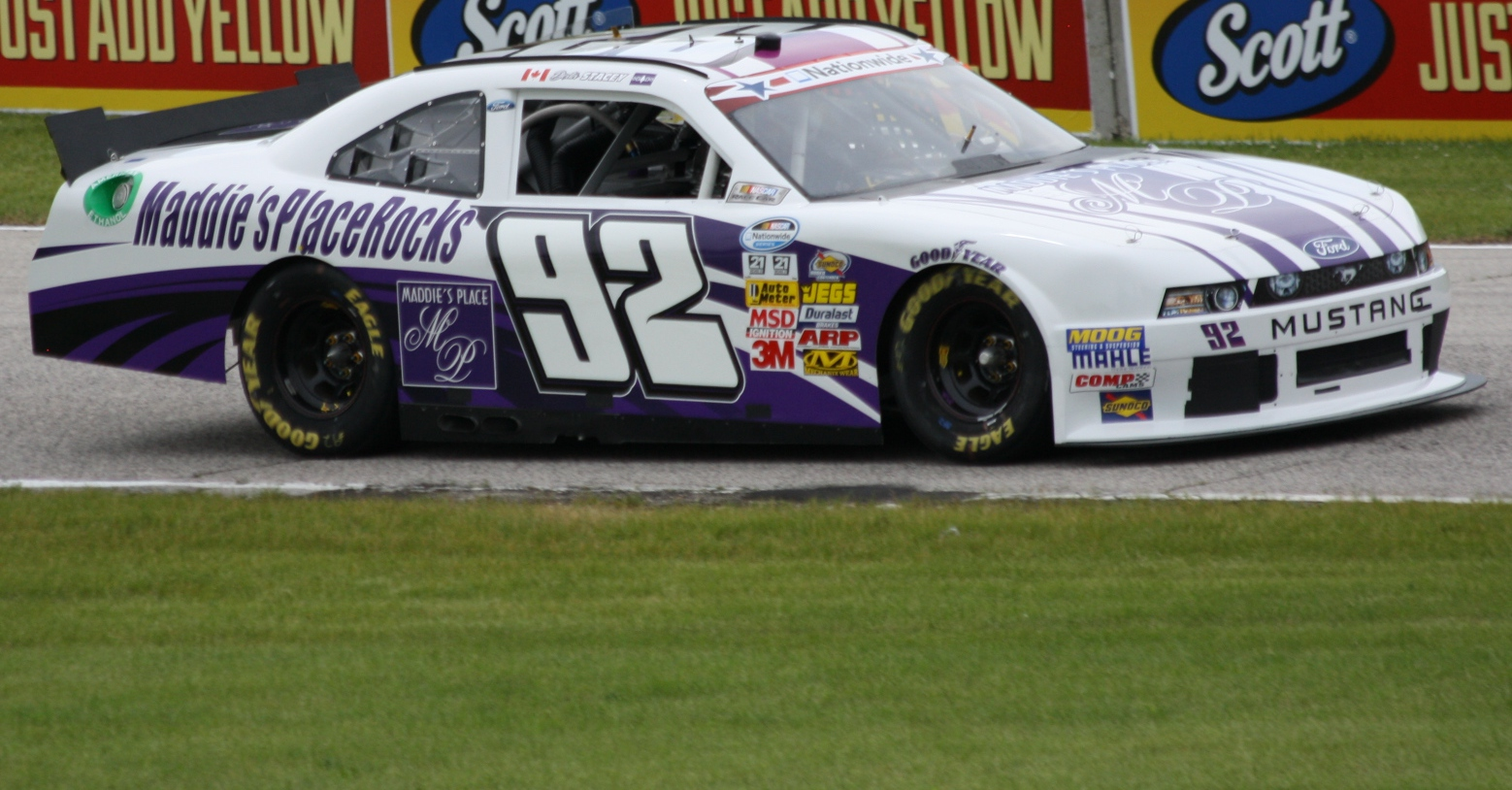
Stacey's No. 92 Nationwide car in 2013

During his part-time Canadian Tire series season, Stacey made his part-time leap into the Nationwide Series in 2012 as well. Stacey made his Nationwide debut at Watkins Glen dropping out during the race after 25 laps for a handling issue and finishing 32nd. He then made his second start as his home event at Circuit Gilles Villeneuve at Montreal, Quebec, but crashed twice and dropped out, finishing 35th. Stacey ran five more races in 2012 that year running with Go Green Racing with a best finish of 24th at Chicagoland. Stacey had a hard time his first seven career Nationwide series races in 2012 with three DNF's and was well off the pace as well. He finished his first part-time season in the Nationwide Series 48th in points.

In January 2013, Stacey announced that he went for 2013 NASCAR Rookie of the Year honors in the Nationwide Series in 2013 after forming KH Motorsports. He drove the No. 92 Ford for the season with sponsorship from Maddie's Place in hopes of running the full season. Unfortunately, two bad things happened during the season. First, at Richmond, he suffered a concussion after a hard crash in turn 1 early in the race and had to miss the next race at Talladega. He also had a similar accident at Michigan and had to have relief from Tim Andrews at Road America. Then, his team started running low on funding and Maddie's Place left the team for a short period of time, forcing Stacey to start skipping races. He did attempt to qualify for Mid-Ohio with the No. 46 team for The Motorsports Group, but failed to qualify. Maddie's Place eventually returned to the No. 92 team late in the year and attempted the final four races, only to qualify for Texas and Homestead and missing Charlotte and Phoenix. Overall, Stacey had no top-twenty finishes and DNQ'd five times with a best finish of 21st in the Iowa Spring race and finished the season 30th in points.

In November 2016, Stacey announced that he would return to the series, now known as the Xfinity Series, driving the No. 70 for Derrike Cope Racing in the last three races of the season.

On January 26, 2023, it was announced that Stacey would return to the Xfinity Series for the first time since 2016 and would drive the No. 66 car for MBM Motorsports in the season-opener at Daytona.

==== Truck Series ====
After not running a national series race in 2014, Stacey made his Camping World Truck Series debut in the WinStar World Casino & Resort 350 at Texas Motor Speedway, driving the No. 50 Chevrolet Silverado for MAKE Motorsports.

In October 2016, Stacey replaced Travis Kvapil in the Texas Roadhouse 200 at Martinsville in the middle of race and finished 27th. However, since Kvapil started the race, he is officially credited with the 27th-place finish.

=== ARCA Racing Series ===
Stacey competed in one ARCA Racing Series event, in 2013, driving the No. 06 Chevrolet for Mike Harmon Racing at Daytona. He started 39th and finished 20th.

== Motorsports career results ==
=== NASCAR ===
(key) (Bold – Pole position awarded by qualifying time. Italics – Pole position earned by points standings or practice time. * – Most laps led.)

==== Xfinity Series ====
NASCAR Xfinity Series results
Year	Team	No.	Make	1	2	3	4	5	6	7	8	9	10	11	12	13	14	15	16	17	18	19	20	21	22	23	24	25	26	27	28	29	30	31	32	33	NXSC	Pts	Ref
2012	R3 Motorsports	23	Chevy	DAY	PHO	LVS	BRI	CAL	TEX	RCH	TAL	DAR	IOW	CLT	DOV	MCH	ROA	KEN	DAY	NHA	CHI	IND	IOW	GLN; 32	CGV; 35	BRI	ATL										48th	90	
2012	Go Green Racing	39	Ford																									RCH; 27	CHI; 24	KEN	DOV	CLT	KAN; 27	TEX	PHO; 30	HOM; 43	48th	90	
2013	KH Motorsports	92	Ford	DAY; DNQ	PHO; 24	LVS; 23	BRI; 26	CAL; 26	TEX; 23	RCH; 38	TAL	DAR; 30	CLT; 27	DOV; 25	IOW; 21	MCH; 39	ROA; 25	KEN; DNQ	DAY; 38	NHA; 26	CHI; 29	IND; Wth	IOW	GLN; Wth									CLT; DNQ	TEX; 39	PHO; DNQ	HOM; 27	30th	257	
2013	The Motorsports Group	46	Chevy																						MOH; DNQ	BRI	ATL	RCH	CHI	KEN	DOV	KAN					30th	257	
2016	Derrike Cope Racing	70	Chevy	DAY	ATL	LVS	PHO	CAL	TEX	BRI	RCH	TAL	DOV	CLT	POC	MCH	IOW	DAY	KEN	NHA	IND	IOW	GLN	MOH	BRI	ROA	DAR	RCH	CHI	KEN	DOV	CLT	KAN	TEX; 37	PHO; DNQ	HOM; DNQ	81st	4	
2023	MBM Motorsports	66	Chevy	DAY; DNQ	CAL	LVS	PHO	ATL	COA	RCH	MAR	TAL; 35	DOV	DAR	CLT	PIR	SON	NSH																			60th	14	
2023	MBM Motorsports	66	Toyota																CSC; DNQ	ATL	NHA	POC	ROA; 25	MCH	IRC	GLN	DAY	DAR	KAN	BRI	TEX	ROV	LVS	HOM	MAR	PHO	60th	14	

==== Camping World Truck Series ====
NASCAR Camping World Truck Series results
Year	Team	No.	Make	1	2	3	4	5	6	7	8	9	10	11	12	13	14	15	16	17	18	19	20	21	22	23	NCWTC	Pts	Ref
2015	MAKE Motorsports	50	Chevy	DAY	ATL	MAR	KAN	CLT	DOV	TEX	GTW	IOW	KEN	ELD	POC	MCH	BRI	MSP	CHI	NHA	LVS	TAL	MAR	TEX; 29	PHO		56th	35	
2015	MAKE Motorsports	1	Chevy																							HOM; 24	56th	35	
2016	MAKE Motorsports	50	Chevy	DAY	ATL	MAR	KAN	DOV	CLT	TEX	IOW	GTW	KEN	ELD	POC	BRI	MCH	MSP	CHI	NHA	LVS	TAL	MAR; RL^{†}	TEX	PHO	HOM	N/A	0^{1}	
^{†} – Relieved Travis Kvapil

==== Pinty's Series ====
NASCAR Pinty's Series results
Year	Team	No.	Make	1	2	3	4	5	6	7	8	9	10	11	12	13	NPSC	Pts	Ref
2009	WJS Motorsports	55	Pontiac	ASE; 18	DEL; 13	MSP; 21	ASE; 21	MPS; 17	EDM; 17	SAS; 17	MSP; 20	CTR; 23	CGV; 22	BAR; 18	RIS; 16	KWA; 24	14th	1378	
2010	WJS Motorsports	55	Dodge	DEL; 18		ASE; 17			MPS; 18	SAS; 15		MSP; 19		BAR; 15	RIS; 12	KWA; 14	10th	1528	
2010	WJS Motorsports	55	Chevy		MSP; 16		TOR; 13	EDM; 14			CTR; 12		CGV; 14				10th	1528	
2011	WJS Motorsports	55	Dodge	MSP; 16		DEL; 15			MPS; 16	SAS; 17	CTR; 25	CGV; 16	BAR; 12	RIS; 18	KWA; 11		10th	1396	
2011	WJS Motorsports	55	Chevy		ICAR; 23		MSP; 7	TOR; 12									10th	1396	
2012	WJS Motorsports	55	Dodge	MSP	ICAR; 27	MSP	DEL	MPS	EDM	SAS	CTR; 23	CGV; 31	BAR; 5	RIS	KWA; 27		30th	107	
2013	WJS Motorsports	55	Dodge	MSP	DEL	MSP	ICAR	MPS	SAS	ASE	CTR; 28	RIS	MSP	BAR	KWA		57th	16	
2019	Melissa McKenzie	21	Dodge	MSP	JUK	ACD	TOR	SAS	SAS	EIR	CTR	RIS	MSP	ASE	NHA; 18		36th	55	
2019	Dumoulin Compétition	91	Dodge													JUK; 15	36th	55	
2020	Kristin Hamelin	92	Chevy	SUN; 11	SUN; 9	FLA; 11	FLA; 11	JUK; 10	JUK; 8								9th	204	
2021	Kristin Hamelin	92	Chevy	SUN; 18	SUN; 18	CTR; 10	ICAR; 7	MSP; 7	MSP; 9	FLA; 17	DEL; 10	DEL; 7	DEL; 7				9th	330	
2022	Kristin Hamelin	92	Chevy	SUN; 18	MSP; 3	ACD; 19	AVE; 6	TOR; 19	EDM; 9	SAS; 6	SAS; 22	CTR; 20	OSK; 16	ICAR; 10	MSP; 13	DEL; 10	11th	401	

^{*} Season still in progress
^{1} Ineligible for series points

=== ARCA Racing Series ===
(key) (Bold – Pole position awarded by qualifying time. Italics – Pole position earned by points standings or practice time. * – Most laps led.)

ARCA Racing Series results
Year	Team	No.	Make	1	2	3	4	5	6	7	8	9	10	11	12	13	14	15	16	17	18	19	20	21	ARSC	Pts	Ref
2013	Mike Harmon Racing	06	Chevy	DAY; 20	MOB	SLM	TAL	TOL	ELK	POC	MCH	ROA	WIN	CHI	NJM	POC	BLN	ISF	MAD	DSF	IOW	SLM	KEN	KAN	126th	130	
