= Le Tour du Québec en BD =

Le Tour du Québec en BD (Travel Quebec Through Graphic Novels) is a collection of graphic novel albums written by Jean-François Gaudet and drawn by Hugues Poirier, with contributions from other artists. The novels are self-published by the authors, through their advertising agency, Le Vent Qui Vente.

The series introduces readers to the regions of Quebec, as well as the Acadia region of New Brunswick, through simple and humorous writing and the meticulously detailed drawings of the architecture and scenery of the areas. The series is designed for tourists visiting the regions, as well as local residents to remind them of their history and heritage. The comic albums look at each region's regional language, way of life, people, activities and events, and their typical landscapes of the regions, with each album hosted by a character that represents the region. Each book also includes a glossary of terms and expressions and a few typical recipes of the regions.

As of 2012, six albums had been published, covering five regions of Quebec and the Acadian region, with eventual plans to cover all regions of Quebec.

== The characters ==
The main character of each graphic novel are all distant cousins of each other, similar in appearance and character, who introduce, with their family and friends, their homes through various storylines:

- Néciphore, a fisherman from the Magdalen Islands
- Théophile, a retiree in Saguenay–Lac-Saint-Jean after 35 years of loyal service at a factory
- Dagobert, a calèche driver in Quebec City
- Philémond, a treasure hunter in Charlevoix
- Stanislas, a cowboy in Mauricie
- Winnyfred, a man from Acadia

All main characters of these novels have rarely traveled outside of their region, as they felt that where they live is where they belong.

== Translation ==
The graphic novel for Quebec City, The Adventures of Dagobert has been translated into English. As much of the humor and puns are Québécois-specific, some of the jokes and the spirit of the story have been lost in the translation. To compensate for this, many original Québécois expressions have been kept in the story, explained in the glossary and in the regional recipes for the English-speaking readers. The authors plan on translating more books as a way to reach out to English-language readers.

== The collection ==
- 2003 – Les aventures de Néciphore, Îles-de-la-Madeleine
- 2004 – Les aventures de Théophile, Saguenay–Lac-Saint-Jean
- 2005 – Les aventures de Dagobert, La ville de Québec
- 2006 – The Adventures of Dagobert, The City of Québec (translated from the French)
- 2006 – Les aventures de Philémond, Charlevoix
- 2007 - Les Aventures de Stanislas, Mauricie
- ? - Les Aventures de Winnyfred, Acadie
