= Ouanani (band) =

- Origin: Montreal, Quebec, Canada
- Genres: World
- Years active: 2004–present
- Members: Gerardo Alvarez; Einar Escaf; Jean Girard-Arsenault; Salpi Guerrero Sanz; Leang Manjarres Wong; Febe Merab; Sadio Sissokho; Tomás Teheran; Diego Valbuena
- Past members: Patrice Agbokou; Alexis Charrier; Elage Diouf; Jean-Emmanuel Duplan; Rachel Jeanty; Anne-Lise Nadeau; Marc-Antoine Olivier; Fritz Pageot; Stefano Pando; Ric'key Pageot; Samito; Wesli
- Website: www.ouanani.com

OUANANI is a world music group formed in 2004 in Montréal by Sadio "Djali Sadio" Sissokho from Dakar, Senegal and Jean "Jean Jean" Girard-Arsenault from Alma, Québec, Canada.

They play as a duo or with musicians from all over the world. They sing in many languages : French, Wolof, Khassonke, Spanish and English. With organic-electronic sounds and a self-deprecating sense of humour, OUANANI fuses Québec with Africa, Caribbean and Latin America.

OUANANI tangles a wide variety of themes such as immigration, racism, love, seduction and surrealism.

Some of their accreditations include the following :

- Album of the Week (ICI, 2008)
- Three times #1 on CIBL's Francophone charts in 2008
- Audience Award at The festival International de la Chanson de Granby in 2004

== Discography ==
=== Studio album ===
Vote etnik produced by Jean Arsenault, Ouanani 2007 in Montreal, Canada

=== Single ===
"La Chikunguña" (Ivan Duran mix, Stonetree Records, 2017) – 3:31 – Words & music : Jean Arsenault.

Produced and recorded in 2016–2017 by Jean Arsenault in Barranquilla and Palenque, Colombia and Montreal, Canada.

- Flavio Andrés : Bass, Guitar
- Jean Arsenault : Voice
- Pocho Cien : Drum
- Jorge "Salpi" Guerrero : Guitar
- Febe Merab : Voice
- Leang Manjarres Wong : Gaita
- Ronnie Maury : Bass
- Keila Miranda : Voice
- Sadio Sissokho : Voice, djembe

- Angel Alvarez : Photos
- Manuel Angulo - ABC records : Edition
- Jean Arsenault - Ouanani : Production, recording, edition
- Ivan Duran - Stonetree Records : Recording, edition, mix, mastering
- Einar Escaf - Einar Escaf Producciones : Recording, edition
- Simon L'Espérance : Edition
- Jean Massicotte - Studio Masterkut : Recording, edition
- Tutuk Muntu : Graphic design

== Video ==
VIDEO

- "Nous Matraquer" produced by CUTV and Ouanani, July 2012
- Directed & edited by : Chico Peres, CUTV 2012
- Kinetic Typing Animation : Hugo Alves
- Cameraman : Chico Peres, Nawfal Zamani
- Dance : Yesenia Pulido, P'andanza

SONG

- Words : Gabriel Nadeau-Dubois, Jean Charest, policier mal élevé, Alexander « Ramon Chicharrón » Betancur, Jean « Jean Jean » Girard-Arsenault, fille furieuse, Amir Khadir, Stéphane Hessel, Dominic Champagne, Charles de Gaulle
- Music : Samuel « Samito » Matsinhe, Alexander « Ramon Chicharron » Betancur, Jean « Jean Jean » Girard-Arsenault, Sadio « Djali Sadio » Sissokho
- Production : Jean "Jean Jean" Arsenault, Ouanani 2012
- Recording, programmation, mix : Pablo Bonacina, Bonabona Musik 2012
- Guitar, congas, voice : Alexander « Ramon Chicharron » Betancur
- Kora, voice : Sadio « Djali Sadio » Sissokho
- Voice : Jean « Jean Jean » Girard-Arsenault
- Text correction : Marie-Julie Desrochers
