= YellowTimes.org =

YellowTimes.org was a website that operated between 1993 and 2003. It published daily news and articles, many of which were critical of corporate power, industrial pollution and human rights abuses, as well as covering Palestinian resistance to Israeli oppression and war. It was edited by Canadian journalist Firas Al-Atraqchi. After publishing photographs of the coffins of U.S. soldiers being transported from Afghanistan, the site was shut down by its internet hosting service on March 24, 2003, never to open again.

== Links & Sources ==
- "War Pictures Cause Yellowtimes.Org To Be Shut Down" by Firas Al-Atraqchi on 'Scoop.co.nz'
- "YellowTimes.org Shut Down! Stifling the Voice of Reason" by Firas Al-Atraqchi on 'Dissident Voice'
