= Heather Crowe (activist) =

Canadian waitress and anti-smoking activist (1945–2006)

- Born: April 23, 1945; Yarmouth, Nova Scotia, Canada
- Died: May 22, 2006 (aged 61); Ottawa, Ontario, Canada
- Occupations: Retired Waitress, Spokesperson for SmokefreeCanada
- Website: Heather Crowe at smoke-free.ca

Heather Crowe (April 23, 1945, Yarmouth, Nova Scotia – May 22, 2006, Ottawa, Ontario) was a Canadian waitress who became the public face of Canada's anti-smoking campaign.

Crowe was diagnosed with lung cancer in 2002. She said that she had "never smoked a day in her life", and believed her cancer to be the result of regularly breathing second-hand smoke at her workplace, Moe's Newport Restaurant, for over forty years. In 2002, she submitted a successful claim related to second-hand smoke exposure in the workplace to the Ontario Workplace Safety & Insurance Board for lost earnings and health care benefits. Based on her $12,000 salary, WSIB awarded her $200 a week, $4,000 a year to help with medical expenses and a one-time payment of $40,000 for pain and suffering.

Shortly before Christmas, 2003, WSIB ordered the 59-year-old Crowe, still undergoing chemotherapy and radiation therapy, back to work.

Following Crowe's lobbying campaign, the province of Ontario passed an anti-smoking bill which banned smoking in all indoor public spaces and near the entrances of government buildings. The law came into effect four days after Crowe's death in 2006.

== See also ==
- Barb Tarbox
