= Murder of Holly Jones =

2003 murder of ten year old girl in Canada

Holly Jones
- Born: Holly Maria Jones; September 14, 1992; Toronto, Ontario, Canada
- Died: May 12, 2003 (aged 10); Toronto, Ontario, Canada
- Cause of death: Strangulation

Holly Maria Jones (September 14, 1992 – May 12, 2003) was a 10-year-old child abduction and murder victim from Toronto, Ontario, Canada. On May 12, 2003, while walking a friend home, she was kidnapped, sexually assaulted, and strangled by Michael Briere. After dismembering her body, Briere attempted to discard the remains by placing them in two bags and used weights to try to sink them in the Toronto Harbour. The bags were found the next morning.

Briere pleaded guilty to the crime, receiving an automatic life sentence and will not be eligible to apply for parole until 2028.

== Background ==
Holly Maria Jones was born on September 14, 1992, to parents Maria Jones and George Stonehouse. She had three older siblings: Shauna, Natasha and James. Jones attended St. Luigi Catholic Elementary School in the Junction Triangle neighborhood at the time of the murder. She enjoyed music and aspired to become a singer, participated in basketball and cross-country running, and was described by those who knew her as imaginative and energetic.

== Disappearance, discovery and investigation ==
On May 12, 2003, Jones disappeared after walking to a friend's home in Toronto's west-end neighbourhood; along her route was Briere's house. Hours after her disappearance, she was reported missing, prompting a large-scale police search and an Amber alert. During this search window, Maria Jones made a plea on television in the hopes her daughter was listening.

Jones' remains were discovered in two duffel bags on the shores of Toronto Island on May 13, 2003. The area surrounding Jones' neighbourhood would see multiple attempted child abductions in the weeks following the murder and heightened police presence in the area. During a wide-scale request for samples from all men in the area where Jones had gone missing, Briere was initially suspected by police for refusing to provide a DNA sample. Police put Briere under surveillance, and obtained a DNA sample by testing his saliva on a soda can he disposed of in a public trash can. Carpet fibres from the green carpet of his apartment were matched to fibres found on Jones' remains. He was arrested and charged with her murder on June 20, 2003.

== Arrest and conviction ==
Michael Briere, a 35-year-old software developer, was charged with the murder at his west-end residence, near Jones' home. On June 17, 2004, Briere pleaded guilty to first-degree murder in the death of Holly Jones. In court, he attributed his actions to viewing child pornography, going on to describe his crime as "cruel, inhuman, and nightmarish", stating he wished to spare his victim's family the pain of a trial. He received an automatic life sentence and will not be eligible to apply for parole until 2028.

== Aftermath ==
After Jones' remains were discovered but before Briere's arrest, NDP president Adam Giambrone helped draft a proposal for "Holly's Law", which he outlined an opinion piece for The Globe and Mail. The proposed law would have required that anyone convicted of child sexual assault undergo mandatory dangerous offender hearings to determine whether they are at risk of reoffending, as well as providing additional rehabilitation programs. Though the proposal was reportedly backed by more than 200,000 petition signatures, it was never adopted.

In the years following Jones' death, several memorial events have been held in Toronto. These include annual community walks, golf tournaments, and toy drives.

== See also ==
- List of kidnappings
- List of solved missing person cases
