= Dave Whitlock =

Canadian racing driver (born 1966)

Dave Whitlock (born July 2, 1966) is a Canadian former race car driver in the NASCAR Canadian Tire Series. He drove and owned the No. 39 Dickies Dodge Charger for his own team Whitlock Motorsports. He used to drive in the Castrol Super Series (Past Champion) and Cascar where he had 12 wins in the series. After the Cascar buyout by NASCAR, he began to race in the Canadian Tire Series. He had one Canadian Tire Series win in his final season of racing, it came in Saint-Eustache the first race of the year. Whitlock sold his race team, Whitlock Motorsports, and retired at the end of the 2009 season.

Whitlock was born in Wyoming, Ontario, Canada.
