= 2009 in Canada =

- Decades: 1980s; 1990s; 2000s; 2010s; 2020s
- See also: History of Canada; Timeline of Canadian history; List of years in Canada

Events from the year 2009 in Canada.

== Incumbents ==
=== Crown ===
- Monarch – Elizabeth II

=== Federal government ===
- Governor General – Michaëlle Jean
- Prime Minister – Stephen Harper
- Chief Justice – Beverley McLachlin (British Columbia)
- Parliament – 40th

=== Provincial governments ===
==== Lieutenant governors ====
- Lieutenant Governor of Alberta – Norman Kwong
- Lieutenant Governor of British Columbia – Steven Point
- Lieutenant Governor of Manitoba – John Harvard (until August 4) then Philip S. Lee
- Lieutenant Governor of New Brunswick – Herménégilde Chiasson (until September 30) then Graydon Nicholas
- Lieutenant Governor of Newfoundland and Labrador – John Crosbie
- Lieutenant Governor of Nova Scotia – Mayann Francis
- Lieutenant Governor of Ontario – David Onley
- Lieutenant Governor of Prince Edward Island – Barbara Oliver Hagerman
- Lieutenant Governor of Quebec – Pierre Duchesne
- Lieutenant Governor of Saskatchewan – Gordon Barnhart

==== Premiers ====
- Premier of Alberta – Ed Stelmach
- Premier of British Columbia – Gordon Campbell
- Premier of Manitoba – Gary Doer (until October 19) then Greg Selinger
- Premier of New Brunswick – Shawn Graham
- Premier of Newfoundland and Labrador – Danny Williams
- Premier of Nova Scotia – Rodney MacDonald (until June 19) then Darrell Dexter
- Premier of Ontario – Dalton McGuinty
- Premier of Prince Edward Island – Robert Ghiz
- Premier of Quebec – Jean Charest
- Premier of Saskatchewan – Brad Wall

=== Territorial governments ===
==== Commissioners ====
- Commissioner of Yukon – Geraldine Van Bibber
- Commissioner of Northwest Territories – Tony Whitford
- Commissioner of Nunavut – Ann Meekitjuk Hanson

==== Premiers ====
- Premier of the Northwest Territories – Floyd Roland
- Premier of Nunavut – Eva Aariak
- Premier of Yukon – Dennis Fentie

== Events ==
=== January to March ===
- January 5 – Fourth explosion from 2008-09 British Columbia pipeline bombings destroyed a metering shed near the community of Tomslake, British Columbia.
- January 8 – Large amount of gang violence in Vancouver starts.
- January 15 – A large blackout hits Toronto affecting an estimated 250,000 people.
- January 26 – The 40th Canadian Parliament reopens for its second session after a two-month prorogation. Governor General Michaëlle Jean reads the Speech from the Throne.
- January 27 – Finance Minister Jim Flaherty presents the 2009 Canadian federal budget to the House of Commons of Canada.
- January 28
  - Opposition Leader Michael Ignatieff announces the support of the Liberal Party for the budget on the condition that his amendment is included.
  - The first of the 2009 Canadian Tamil protests begin in front of the Consulate General office of Sri Lanka in Toronto.
- January 29 – 2008-09 York University Strike comes to an end with a count of 42–8 ending the strike.
- February 19 – Newly sworn American president Barack Obama made his first foreign trip by visiting Canada.
- February 22 – Spanish fishing vessel Monte Galineiro sank off the coast of Newfoundland and Labrador.
- March 12 – A helicopter crash off the coast of Newfoundland kills 17.
- March 17 – Former U.S. president George W. Bush gave a talk in Calgary, Alberta.
- March 29 – Researchers from the University of Toronto discover GhostNet.

=== April to September ===
- April 2 – Stephen Harper attends the 2009 G-20 London summit.
- April 6 – Tamil protesters gather at Parliament Hill, Ottawa for a non-stop, continuous protest requesting Harper to call for a ceasefire to the Sri Lankan Civil War. Six people begin their own hunger strikes.
- April 8 – Victoria "Tori" Stafford is abducted from Oliver Stephens Public School in Woodstock, Ontario.
- April 26 – First cases of the 2009 H1N1 outbreak are confirmed in Canada.
- April 30 – Liberal Party of Canada leadership convention is held in Vancouver, British Columbia.
- May 6 – Canada begins negotiations with the European Union on the Comprehensive Economic and Trade Agreement.
- May 20 – Two people, Michael Thomas Rafferty, and Terri-Lyne McClintic are charged with the abduction and murder of Victoria "Tori" Stafford.
- June 17 – School stabbings happen at St. Joseph Secondary School in Mississauga.
- June 22 – Start of the 2009 City of Toronto inside and outside workers strike.
- June 24 to July 3 – Death and state funeral of Roméo LeBlanc, former Governor General
- July 4 – Natural gas line was bombed for the sixth time near Dawson Creek.
- July 8 – Stephen Harper attends the 35th G8 summit.
- July 9 – A small plane crashed on final approach to Vancouver International Airport, killing all two people on board. No one on the ground was injured, while an IKEA in the parking lot suffered some damage.
- July 17 – R. v. Grant is ruled on at the Supreme Court of Canada.
- July 23 – Shawn Atleo is chosen as the organization's new national chief at the Assembly of First Nations leadership convention.
- August 1 – One person was killed and seventy-five others were injured, when the stage collapsed at the Big Valley Jamboree due to a severe thunderstorm and high winds.
- August 6 – The 67th World Science Fiction Convention is held in Montreal, Quebec at the Palais des congrès de Montréal.
- August 19 – CrossIron Mills opens near the Calgary area.
- August 20 – 18 tornadoes rated up to F2 struck Southwestern Ontario, Central Ontario and the Greater Toronto Area.

=== October to December ===
- October 17
  - Greg Selinger is chosen as the new leader of the Manitoba New Democratic Party and the new premier of Manitoba.
  - Danielle Smith is chosen as the new leader of the Wildrose Alliance Party of Alberta.
- October 18 – Gilles Taillon is chosen as the new leader of the Action démocratique du Québec.
- October 20 – Former U.S. president George W. Bush spoke in Edmonton, Alberta.
- October 22 – Former U.S. president George W. Bush spoke in Montreal, Quebec.
- October 29 – The premiers of New Brunswick and Quebec sign a memorandum of understanding to sell most assets of NB Power to Hydro-Quebec for C$4.75 billion.
- October – Art Battle Canada painting events are started in Toronto.
- November 9 – Four by-elections are held to fill vacancies in the House of Commons.
- November 10 – Just 23 days after assuming the leadership of the Action démocratique du Québec, Gilles Taillon resigns, citing both caucus infighting and alleged irregularities in the party's financial records which he called on the Sûreté du Québec to investigate.
- November 15 – Mike Schreiner is chosen as the new leader of the Green Party of Ontario.
- December 10 – The Olympic torch arrives at Parliament Hill and is carried into the House by Barbara Ann Scott.
- December 15 – Haitian prime minister Jean-Max Bellerive is welcomed to Canada to talk about security and development of Haiti

=== Unknown date ===
- The government cryptologic agency, Tutte Institute for Mathematics and Computing, is founded.

== Arts and literature ==
=== Art ===
- March 6 – Art and Social Responsibility The Interdependence of the Arts and Civil Society conference is held in Toronto, Ontario.

=== Film ===
- January 23 – 3 saisons is released in Quebec
- April 4 – The 29th Genie Awards are held at the Canada Aviation Museum in Ottawa, Ontario.
- September 10 – The 2009 Toronto International Film Festival was held.

=== Music ===
- March 29 – The Juno Awards of 2009 are held in Vancouver, hosted by Russell Peters.
- September 21 – The 2009 Polaris Music Prize is won by Fucked Up for their album The Chemistry of Common Life.

=== Literature ===
- Scotiabank Giller Prize – Linden MacIntyre, The Bishop's Man

== Sport ==
- January 4 – The 2009 World U-17 Hockey Challenge is held in several cities in the Lower Mainland.
- January 6 – Team Canada wins the 2009 World Junior Ice Hockey Championships for the 5th time in a row.
- February 4 – The 2009 Four Continents Figure Skating Championships is held in Vancouver.
- March 12 – The 2009 World Single Distance Speed Skating Championships are held in Richmond, BC.
- April 13 – The 2009 Allan Cup is held in Steinbach, Manitoba.
- May 15 – The 2009 season of the Canadian Soccer League starts.
- May 24 – Windsor Spitfires won their First Memorial Cup by defeating the Kelowna Rockets 4 to 1. The Tournament was played at Colisée de Rimouski in Rimouski, Quebec
- June 20 – In the 2009 Men's Pan-American Volleyball Cup, Canada placed second in group A.
- July 12 – The 2009 Honda Indy Toronto takes place at Exhibition Place in Toronto.
- July 26
  - The Trophée des Champions Final was held in Montreal.
  - The 2009 Rexall Edmonton Indy takes place at the Rexall Speedway.
- August 12 – 2009 ICF Canoe Sprint World Championships is held in Dartmouth, Nova Scotia on Lake Banook.
- August 15 – Canada competed at the 2009 World Championships in Athletics
- October 12 – The Canadian National Challenge Cup 2009 was held in Saskatoon, Saskatchewan.
- November 28 – Queen's Golden Gaels won their Fourth(and First since 1992) Vanier Cup by defeating the Calgary Dinos 33 to 31 in the 45th Grey Cup played at PEPS Stadium in Quebec City
- November 29 – Montreal Alouettes won their Sixth Grey Cup by defeating the Saskatchewan Roughriders 28 to 27 in the 97th Grey Cup played at McMahon Stadium in Calgary.

== Deaths ==
=== January ===
- January 1 – Hubert Desbiens, politician, (born 1931).
- January 8 – Richard John Neuhaus, churchman and author (born 1936)
- January 10 – Jean Pelletier, politician and Mayor of Quebec City (born 1935)
- January 11 – Daryl Seaman, businessman (born 1922)
- January 20 – Stan Hagen, politician (born 1940)
- January 22 – John Alan Beesley, diplomat and civil servant (born 1927)
- January 23
  - Helen Maksagak, politician, first woman and first Inuk Northwest Territories Commissioner (born 1931)
  - Percy Smith, barrister, lawyer and politician (born 1922)
- January 31
  - Thérèse Lavoie-Roux, politician and Senator (born 1928)
  - Dewey Martin, rock drummer (born 1940)

=== February ===
- February 2 – Russ Germain, radio presenter (born 1947)
- February 5
  - John W. Grace, first Privacy Commissioner of Canada (born 1927)
  - Leo Orenstein, director, producer and writer (b.c. 1919)
- February 6 – George Karpati, neurologist and neuroscientist (born 1934)
- February 8 – Bob Stephen, Canadian football player (born 1958)
- February 23
  - Elizabeth Bradford Holbrook, portrait sculptor (born 1913)
  - Scott Symons, writer (born 1933)
- February 25 – Molly Kool, North America's first registered female sea captain (born 1916)
- February 27 – James Page Mackey, chief of Toronto Police Service (born 1913)

=== March ===
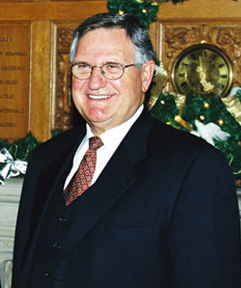
Gilbert Parent

- March 1 – Alf Pike, ice hockey player and coach (born 1917)
- March 2 – Michael Baker, politician (born 1957)
- March 3
  - Gilbert Parent, politician and 33rd Speaker of the House of Commons of Canada (born 1935)
  - Alessandro De Rango, mathematician (born 1959)
- March 4 – Yvon Cormier, wrestler (born 1938)
- March 9 – Larry Regan, ice hockey player, coach and manager (born 1930)
- March 10 – Tom Hanson, photojournalist (born 1967)
- March 11 – Harvey Lowe, broadcaster and yo-yo world champion (born 1918)
- March 13 – Andrew Martin, wrestler (born 1975)
- March 15 – Edmund Hockridge, singer and actor (born 1919)
- March 17 – Gaston Labrèche, Chief Justice of Quebec Superior Court
- March 18 – Donald Tolmie, politician (born 1923)
- March 21
  - Walt Poddubny, ice hockey player and coach (born 1960)
  - Doug Frith, MP for Sudbury (1980–1988), Minister of Indian Affairs and Northern Development (1984) (born 1945)
- March 22 – Archie Green, folklorist and musicologist (born 1917)
- March 26 – Shane McConkey, extreme skier and base jumper (born 1969)
- March 29 – Ivor Dent, politician and mayor of Edmonton (born 1924)

=== April ===
- April 2
  - Émilie Lavoie, supercentenarian (born 1898)
  - Albert Sanschagrin, Bishop of Saint-Hyacinthe, Quebec (born 1911)
- April 6 – J. M. S. Careless, historian (born 1919)
- April 8 – Victoria Stafford, murder victim (born 2000)
- April 10 – Frank Morris Canadian football player (born 1923)
- April 12
  - Derek Weiler, editor and writer (born 1968)
  - Danny Cameron, politician (born 1924)
  - Kent Douglas, ice hockey player and coach (born 1936)
- April 23 – Gordon Gair, lacrosse player (born 1916)
- April 24 – Orville Howard Phillips, politician and Senator (born 1924)
- April 27 – John Crispo, economist and educator (born 1933)
- April 28 – Ted Reynolds, television and radio sportscaster (born 1925)

=== May ===
- May 3 – Renée Morisset, pianist (born 1928)
- May 7
  - Robin Blaser, author and poet (born 1925)
  - Hugh Stansfield, Chief Judge of the Provincial Court of British Columbia (born 1952)
- May 11 – Lude Check, ice hockey player (born 1917)
- May 19 – Clint Smith, ice hockey player and coach (born 1913)
- May 20 – Arthur Erickson, architect and urban planner (born 1924)
- May 22 – Randy Steele, television news reporter (born 1962)
- May 26
  - Charles Dalfen, chairperson of the Canadian Radio-television and Telecommunications Commission (born 1943)
  - Peter Zezel, ice hockey player (born 1965)
- May 27 – Abram Hoffer, orthomolecular psychiatrist (born 1917)
- May 28
  - Marcel Béliveau, television host, film director and comedian (born 1940)
  - Lawrence Heisey, businessman (born 1930)
  - John Tolos, wrestler and wrestling manager (born 1930)
  - Betty Tancock, Olympic swimmer (born 1911)
- May 29 – Hank Bassen, ice hockey player (born 1932)
- May 30 – Eva Dawes, bronze medal-winning Olympic high jumper (1932) (born 1912)

=== June ===
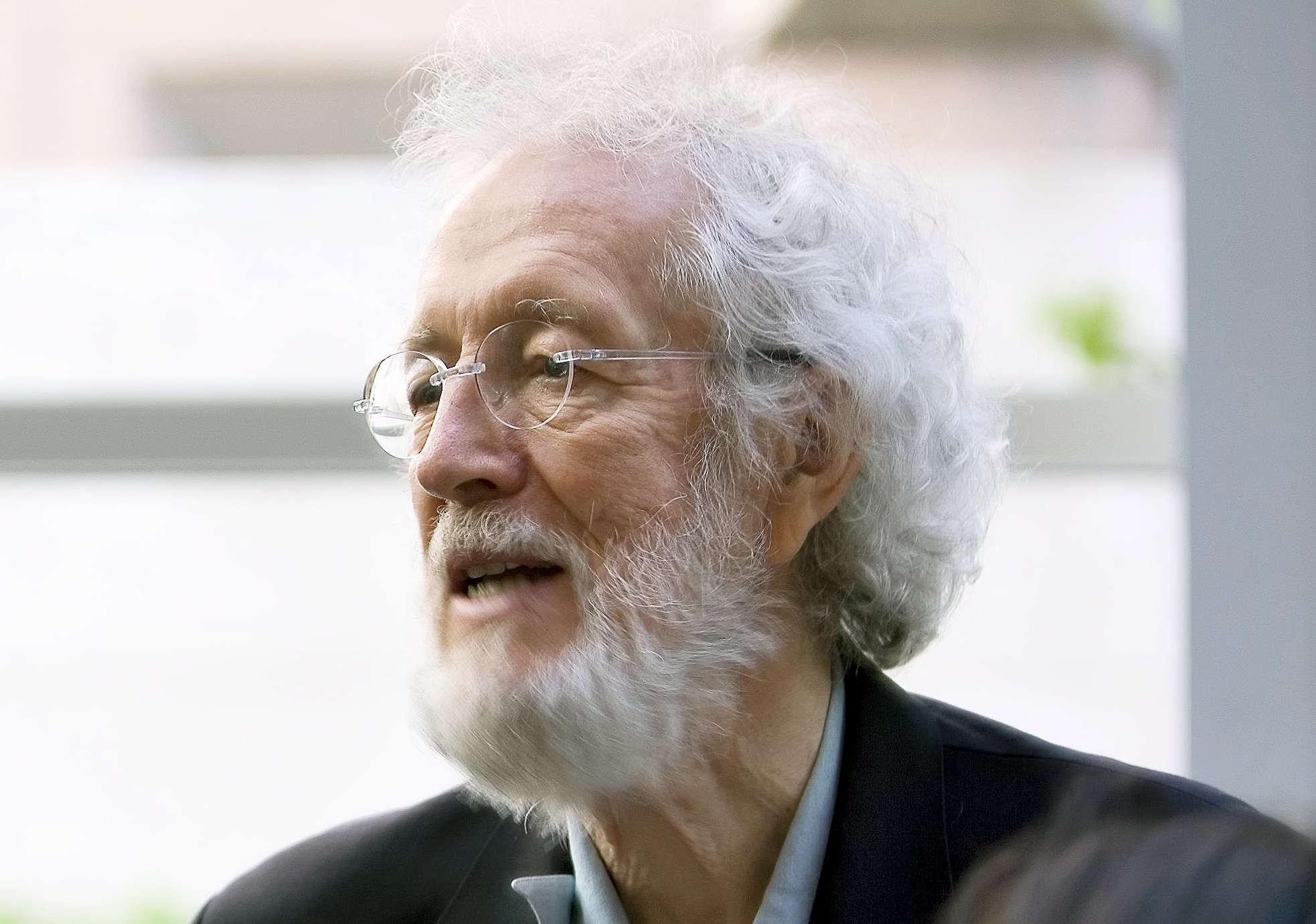
Allan King

- June 3
  - David Bromige, poet (born 1933)
  - Sam George, native rights activist (born 1952)
  - Benoit Marleau, actor (born 1937)
- June 8 – Sheila Finestone, politician and Senator (born 1927)
- June 8 – Nathan Marsters, ice hockey player (born 1980)
- June 14
  - William McIntyre, Puisne Justice of the Supreme Court of Canada (1979–1989) (born 1918)
  - Angela Coughlan, swimmer and Olympic bronze medalist (born 1952)
- June 15 – Allan King, film director (born 1930)
- June 17
  - Gordon Wray, politician (born 1951)
  - Tony Wong, politician (born 1948)
  - Charles A. Barkley, politician, Mayor of South Dundas, Ontario (born 1950)
- June 19 – Alex Nicholson, professional ice hockey goaltender (born 1923)
- June 20 – Roseanne Allen, Olympic cross-country skier (born 1954)
- June 21 – Lorena Gale, playwright (born 1958)
- June 22 – Billy Red Lyons, professional wrestler (born 1932)
- June 23 – Raymond Berthiaume, jazz musician, singer and record producer (born 1931)
- June 24 – Roméo LeBlanc, Governor General & politician (born 1927)
- June 27 – Jackie Washington, blues musician (born 1919)
- June 28 – Terry Black, singer (born 1949)
- June 29
  - Jan Rubeš, Czech-Canadian singer and actor (born 1920)
  - Pauline Picard, politician, MP for Drummond (1993–2008) (born 1947)
  - Glen Nicoll, farm writer and photojournalist (born 1953)
  - Dave Batters, politician, MP for Palliser (2004–2008) (born 1969)

=== July ===
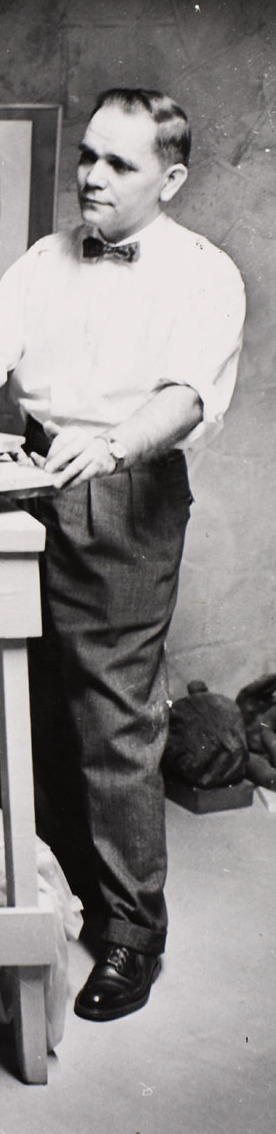
Leo Mol died July 4

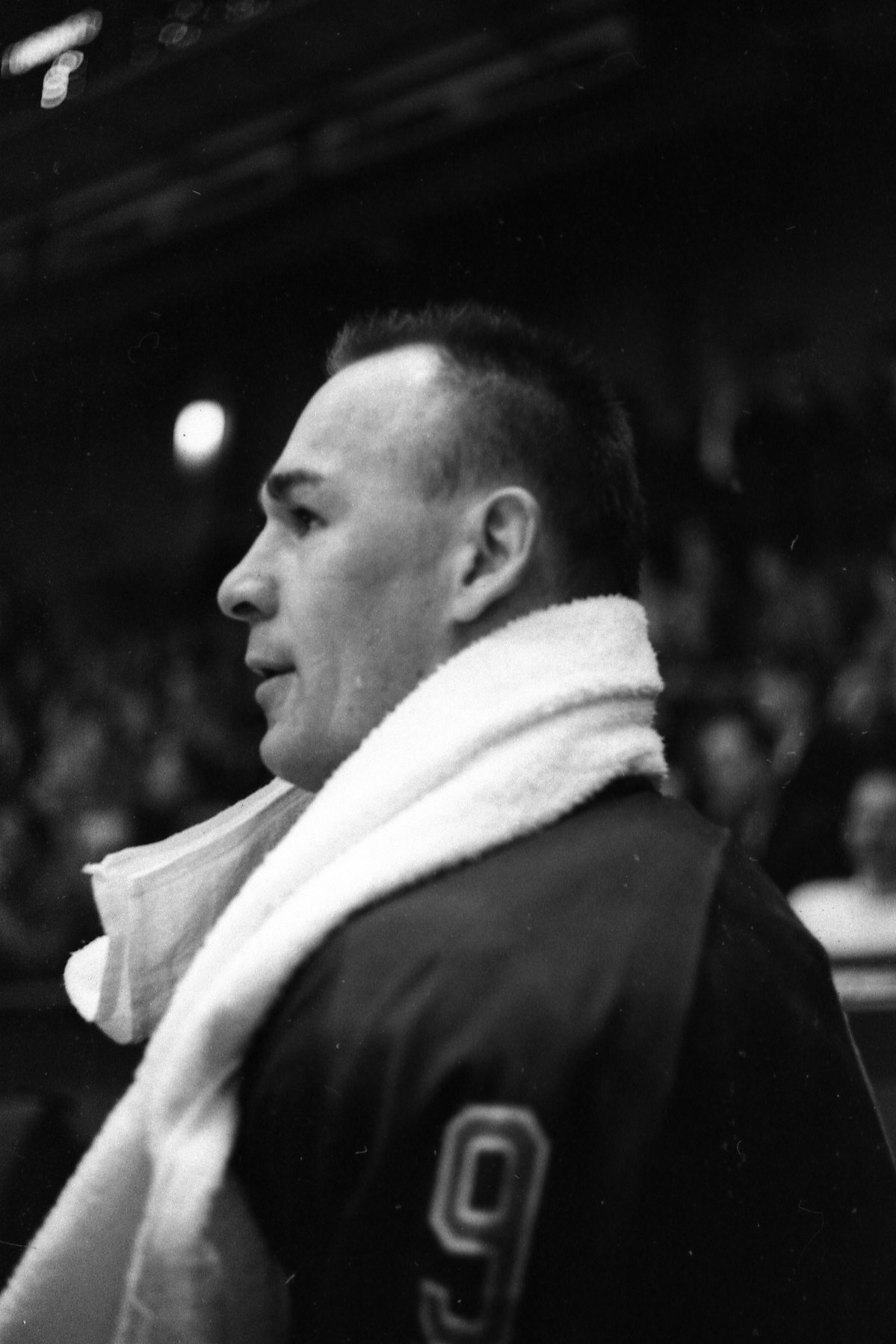
Reg Fleming

- July 4 – Leo Mol, sculptor (born 1915)
- July 5 – Waldo Von Erich, professional wrestler (born 1933)
- July 6 – Martin Streek, disc jockey (born 1964)
- July 9 – Ron Kennedy, ice hockey player and trainer (born 1953)
- July 11
  - Arturo Gatti, boxer (born 1972)
  - Reg Fleming, hockey player (Chicago Blackhawks) (born 1936)
- July 13 – Neil Munro, director, actor and playwright (born 1947)
- July 14 – Phyllis Gotlieb, science fiction author (born 1926)
- July 15 – Brian Goodwin, mathematician (born 1931)
- July 16
  - Jerry Holland, fiddler and composer (born 1955)
  - Charles Gonthier, jurist, Supreme Court Justice (1989–2003) (born 1928)
- July 18 – Robert Uffen, research geophysicist, professor, and university administrator (born 1923)
- July 21 – Les Lye, actor and broadcaster (born 1924)
- July 22 – Mark Leduc, Olympic boxer (born 1964)
- July 26 – Jerry Yanover, Liberal Party strategist (born 1947)
- July 27 – Lee Orr, Olympic athlete (born 1917)
- July 30 – Joy Langan, Member of Parliament for Mission—Coquitlam (1988–1993) (born 1943)

=== August ===
- August 5
  - Al Tomko, professional wrestler (born 1931)
  - Gerald Cohen, Marxist political philosopher (born 1941)
- August 6
  - Donald Marshall, Jr., Aboriginal wrongfully convicted of murder (born 1953)
  - Stanley Haidasz, politician, MP for Trinity (1957–1958) and Parkdale (1962–1978), Senator (1978–1998) (born 1923)
- August 10 – Sylvia Lennick, sketch comedy actor (Wayne and Shuster) (born 1915)
- August 13
  - Al Purvis, Olympic gold medal-winning ice hockey player (1952) (born 1929)
  - Joseph Gilles Napoléon Ouellet, Archbishop of Rimouski (born 1922)
- August 14 – Ted "Teeder" Kennedy, hockey player (born 1925)
- August 21 – Chris McCubbins, Olympic athlete (born 1945)
- August 22 – Muriel Duckworth, feminist and activist (born 1908)
- August 29 – Sam Etcheverry, American-born Canadian football player, member of the Canadian Football Hall of Fame (born 1930)

=== September ===
- September 1 – Alexis Tioseco, Filipino-born Canadian film critic (born 1981)
- September 7 – Fred Mills, musician (Canadian Brass) (born 1935)
- September 9
  - Frank Mazzuca, businessman, Mayor of Capreol, Ontario (born 1922)
  - Eric Davidson, blind mechanic, survivor of the Halifax Explosion (born 1915)
- September 10
  - Lyn Hamilton, author (born 1944)
  - Kerry Brown, professional wrestler (born 1958)
- September 11 – Pierre Cossette, television producer (born 1923)
- September 13 – Philip Aziz, artist (born 1923)
- September 18 – Doug Fisher, journalist and politician, MP for Port Arthur (1957–1965) (born 1919)
- September 19 – Gabriel Beaudry, Olympic rower (born 1927)
- September 23 – Stuart Robertson, journalist and gardener (born 1944)
- September 24 – Nelly Arcan, novelist (born 1973)
- September 25 – Pierre Falardeau, movie director (born 1946)
- September 27 – Alan Dick, principal of Canadian International School of Hong Kong (born 1954)
- September 29 – Ray Nettles, Canadian football player (BC Lions) (born 1949)

=== October ===
- October 1 – Luigi Moro, footballer and football coach (born 1918)
- October 2 – Harvey Veniot, MLA for Pictou West (1956–1974), Speaker of the Nova Scotia House of Assembly (1961–1968) (born 1915)
- October 6 – Douglas Campbell, actor (born 1922)
- October 8 – Gerald Ferguson, artist (born 1937)
- October 10 – Joan Orenstein, actress (born 1923)
- October 11 – Herb Leblanc, musician (born 1928)
- October 19 – Joseph Wiseman, actor (born 1918)
- October 20 – Margaret Fitzgerald, supercentenarian (born 1896)
- October 22 – Howard Darwin, sports promoter, founder of the Ottawa 67's (born 1931)
- October 23
  - Lou Jacobi, actor (born 1913)
  - Jack Poole, multimillionaire, real estate developer (born 1933)
- October 28 – Ted Nebbeling, former British Columbia MLA (born 1943)
- October 28 – Taylor Mitchell, singer-songwriter (born 1990)
- October 29 – Gino Fracas, football player (born 1930)
- October 31 – Harry Gauss, soccer coach (born 1952)

=== November ===
- November 1 – Gus Mitges, politician (born 1919)
- November 5 – Adam Firestorm, professional wrestler (born 1976)
- November 11
  - Bernd Dittrich, Austrian football player (born 1988)
  - Tony Anselmo, football executive (born 1918)
- November 15 – Richard Carlyle, actor (born 1914)
- November 22 – Haydain Neale, musician (born 1970)
- November 28 – Gilles Carle, filmmaker (born 1929)
- November 30 – George Atkins, radio and TV presenter (CBC), founder of Farm Radio International (born 1917)
- Date uncertain – Claire Drainie Taylor, actor and writer

=== December ===
- December 9 – Goldie Semple, stage actor (born 1952)
- December 10
  - Roy Shatzko, football player (born 1940)
  - Jean-Robert Gauthier, MP for Ottawa East (born 1929)
- December 11 – Damien Truth, wrestler (born 1980)
- December 14 – David Pecaut, Municipal entrepreneur (born 1955)
- December 18
  - Rex Yetman, bluegrass musician (born 1933)
  - Del St. John, ice hockey player (born 1931)
  - Harold Lundrigan, businessman (born 1928)
- December 28 – Terry Matte, television news producer (born 1943)
- December 30
  - Michelle Lang, reporter (born 1975)
  - Peter Corren, gay rights activist (born 1947)

== See also ==
- History of Canada
- List of years in Canada

== See also ==
- 2009 in Canadian music
- 2009 in Canadian television
- List of Canadian films of 2009
