= 1923 in Canada =

- Decades: 1900s; 1910s; 1920s; 1930s; 1940s
- See also: History of Canada; Timeline of Canadian history; List of years in Canada

Events from the year 1923 in Canada.

== Incumbents ==
=== Crown ===
- Monarch – George V

=== Federal government ===
- Governor General – Julian Byng
- Prime Minister – William Lyon Mackenzie King
- Chief Justice – Louis Henry Davies (Prince Edward Island)
- Parliament – 14th

=== Provincial governments ===
==== Lieutenant governors ====
- Lieutenant Governor of Alberta – Robert Brett
- Lieutenant Governor of British Columbia – Walter Cameron Nichol
- Lieutenant Governor of Manitoba – James Albert Manning Aikins
- Lieutenant Governor of New Brunswick – William Pugsley (until February 28) then William Frederick Todd
- Lieutenant Governor of Nova Scotia – MacCallum Grant
- Lieutenant Governor of Ontario – Henry Cockshutt
- Lieutenant Governor of Prince Edward Island – Murdock MacKinnon
- Lieutenant Governor of Quebec – Charles Fitzpatrick (until October 31) then Louis-Philippe Brodeur
- Lieutenant Governor of Saskatchewan – Henry William Newlands

==== Premiers ====
- Premier of Alberta – Herbert Greenfield
- Premier of British Columbia – John Oliver
- Premier of Manitoba – John Bracken
- Premier of New Brunswick – Walter Foster (until February 28) then Peter Veniot
- Premier of Nova Scotia – George Henry Murray (until January 24) then Ernest Howard Armstrong
- Premier of Ontario – Ernest Drury (until July 16) then George Howard Ferguson
- Premier of Prince Edward Island – John Howatt Bell (until September 5) then James D. Stewart
- Premier of Quebec – Louis-Alexandre Taschereau
- Premier of Saskatchewan – Charles Avery Dunning

=== Territorial governments ===
==== Commissioners ====
- Gold Commissioner of Yukon – George P. MacKenzie
- Commissioner of Northwest Territories – William Wallace Cory

== Events ==
- January 1 – The Department of National Defence comes into being
- January 24 – Ernest Armstrong becomes premier of Nova Scotia, replacing George Henry Murray, who had governed for 27 years
- February 28 – Peter Veniot becomes premier of New Brunswick, replacing Walter Foster
- April 23 – Marijuana is prohibited soon after the House of Commons passes a bill on this date that includes making marijuana illegal
- March 2 – The Halibut Treaty signed with the United States is Canada's first international treaty not signed under the auspices of the United Kingdom
- June 25 – Ontario election: Howard Ferguson's Conservatives win a majority, defeating Ernest Charles Drury's United Farmers of Ontario
- July 1 – The Chinese Immigration Act, 1923 comes into effect, banning all Chinese from entering Canada except for businessmen, diplomats, foreign students, and "special circumstances"
- July 16 – Howard Ferguson becomes premier of Ontario, replacing Ernest Charles Drury
- July 26- Warren G Harding visits Vancouver the first sitting American president to visit Canada post confederation
- August 18 – The Home Bank of Canada fails
- September 5 – James D. Stewart becomes premier of Prince Edward Island, replacing John Howatt Bell
- October 8 – A stevedore's strike begins in Vancouver
- October 10 – Canadian National Railway is formed by merger of Canadian Government Railways, Canadian Northern Railway, Grand Trunk Pacific Railway, and Grand Trunk Railway
- October 25 – Frederick Banting and Charles Best win the Nobel Prize for Medicine for the discovery of insulin
- October 31 – Louis-Philippe Brodeur becomes Quebec's 13th Lieutenant Governor
- November 11 – The Fredericton Cenotaph was dedicated in Fredericton, New Brunswick.

=== Full date unknown ===
- The Duplex, a Canadian 4-cylinder automobile is built in Montreal.
- Fleetwood-Knight, a Canadian automobile is built in Kingston, Ontario.

== Arts and literature ==
=== Music ===
- April 23 – The Toronto Symphony Orchestra gives its first concert.

=== New books ===
- Rilla of Ingleside Lucy Maud Montgomery (1921)

== Sport ==
- March 14 – The world's first complete play-by-play radio broadcast of a professional ice hockey game is done by Pete Parker in Regina.
- March 22 – Foster Hewitt announces his first ice hockey game.
- March 22 and 26 – The Manitoba Junior Hockey League's University of Manitoba win their only Memorial Cup by defeating the Ontario Hockey Association's Kitchener Colts 14 to 6 in a two-game aggregate played at Arena Gardens in Toronto
- March 31 – The Ottawa Senators win their 10th Stanley Cup by defeating the Western Canada Hockey League's Edmonton Eskimos 2 games to 0. The deciding game was played at Vancouver's Denman Arena
- December 1 – Queen's University win their second Grey Cup by defeating the Regina Rugby Club 54–0 in the 11th Grey Cup played at Varsity Stadium in Toronto

== Births ==
=== January to March ===
- January 1 – Roméo Sabourin, World War II spy (d. 1944)
- January 7 – Hugh Kenner, literary scholar, critic and professor (d. 2003)
- January 21 – Judith Merril, science fiction writer, editor and political activist (d. 1997)
- January 27 – Marcelle Corneille, administrator and educator (d. 2019)
- February 4 – Conrad Bain, actor (Maude, Diff'rent Strokes) (d. 2013)
- March 1 – Uno Helava, inventor
- March 2 – Ghitta Caiserman-Roth, painter (d. 2005)
- March 4 – Stanley Haidasz, politician (d. 2009)
- March 10 – Richard Doyle, journalist, editor and Senator (d. 2003)
- March 15 – Laurent Desjardins, politician (d. 2012)
- March 19 – Henry Morgentaler, physician and pro choice advocate (d. 2013)
- March 23 - James Barber, cookbook author and television chef (d. 2007)
- March 30 – Milton Acorn, poet, writer and playwright (d. 1986)

=== April to June ===
- April 7 – Aba Bayefsky, artist and teacher (d. 2001)
- April 25 – Melissa Hayden, ballerina (d. 2006)
- May 5 – John Black Aird, lawyer, politician and 23rd Lieutenant Governor of Ontario (d. 1995)
- May 9 – Reuben Baetz, politician (d. 1996)
- May 12 – Colombe Pelletier, pianist, coach and accompanist (d. 2021)
- May 18 – Jean-Louis Roux, entertainer and playwright
- May 20 – Frank Morris, Canadian football player (d. 2009)
- June 3 – Phil Nimmons, jazz musician (d. 2024)
- June 5 – Roger Lebel, actor (d. 1994)
- June 6 – Bruce Campbell, Edmonton alderman (d. 2011)

=== July to September ===
- July 21 – Rudolph A. Marcus, chemist and 1992 Nobel Prize in Chemistry laureate (d. 2026)
- July 25 – Bill Fitsell, sports journalist and historian (d. 2020)
- July 31 – Victor Goldbloom, pediatrician, lecturer and politician (d. 2016)
- August 3 – Robert Campeau, financier and real estate developer
- August 6 – Paul Hellyer, politician and commentator
- September 1 – Kenneth Thomson, 2nd Baron Thomson of Fleet, businessman and art collector (d. 2006)
- September 2 – David Lam, businessman and 25th Lieutenant Governor of British Columbia (d. 2010)
- September 7 – Byron Seaman, businessman and part owner of the Calgary Flames (d. 2021)
- September 18 – Bertha Wilson, jurist and first female Puisne Justice of the Supreme Court of Canada (d. 2007)
- September 21 – Robert Uffen, research geophysicist, professor, and university administrator (d. 2009)

=== October to December ===
- October 7 – Jean-Paul Riopelle, painter and sculptor (d. 2002)
- October 10 - Kildare Dobbs, short story and travel writer (d. 2013)
- October 22 – Rodrigue Bourdages, politician (d. 1997)
- October 22 – Norman Levine, short-story writer, novelist and poet (d. 2005)
- October 23 – Réjane L. Colas, jurist
- November 1 – Gordon R. Dickson, science fiction author (d. 2001)
- November 2 – Harold Horwood, novelist and non-fiction writer (d. 2006)
- November 11 – Donald Tolmie, politician (d. 2009)
- November 22 – Arthur Hiller, film director
- December 27 – Bruno Bobak, artist (d. 2012)

== Deaths ==
=== January to June ===
- February 20 – Thomas George Roddick, surgeon, medical administrator and politician (b. 1846)
- March 2 – Joseph Martin, lawyer, politician and 13th Premier of British Columbia (b. 1852)
- April 25 – Louis-Olivier Taillon, Premier of Quebec (b. 1840)
- June 7 – John Best, politician (b. 1861)

=== July to December ===
- July 17 – John Strathearn Hendrie, Lieutenant Governor of Ontario (b. 1857)
- October 2 – John Wilson Bengough, political cartoonist (b. 1851)
- December 5 – William Mackenzie, railway contractor and entrepreneur (b. 1849)
- December 9 – John Herbert Turner, Premier of British Columbia (b. 1834)

== See also ==
- List of Canadian films
