= Alex Nicholson =

Alex Nicholson may refer to:

- Alex Nicholson (ice hockey) (1923–2009), Canadian ice hockey goaltender
- Alex Nicholson (Welsh footballer) (born 1994), Welsh footballer
- Alex Nicholson (Australian footballer) (1897–1972), Australian rules footballer
- Alex Nicholson (fighter) (born 1990), American mixed martial artist

== See also ==
- Alexander Nicholson (disambiguation)
