= List of Buffalo Sabres award winners =

Buffalo Sabres awards
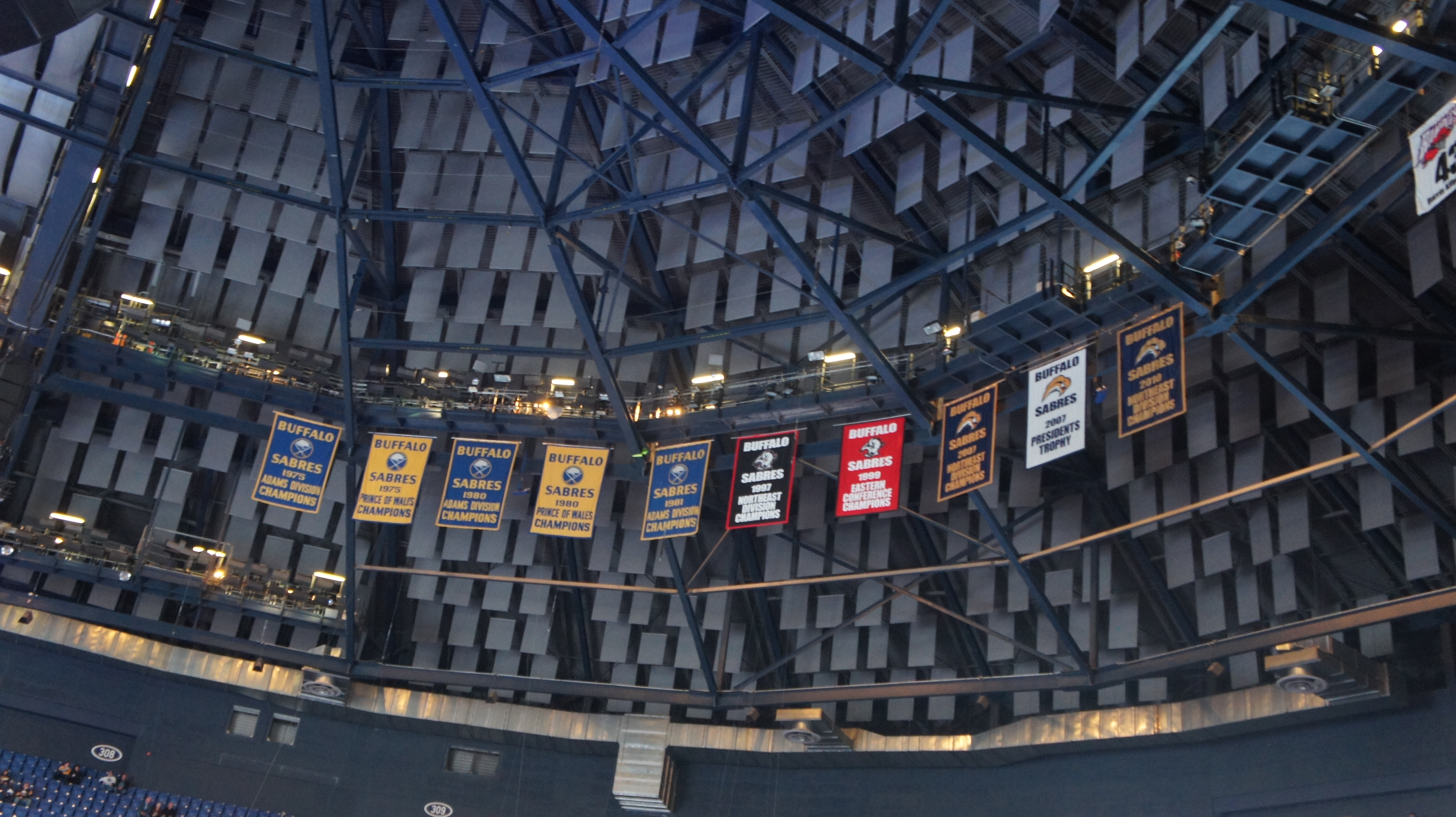
- Banners hanging in KeyBank Center

Team trophies
- Award*: Wins
- Stanley Cup: 0
- Prince of Wales Trophy: 3
- Presidents' Trophy: 1

Individual awards
- Award*: Wins
- Bill Masterton Memorial Trophy: 2
- Calder Memorial Trophy: 3
- Charlie Conacher Memorial Trophy: 1
- Frank J. Selke Trophy: 2
- Hart Memorial Trophy: 2
- Jack Adams Award: 2
- King Clancy Memorial Trophy: 1
- Lady Byng Memorial Trophy: 1
- Lester Patrick Trophy: 2
- NHL Foundation Player Award: 2
- NHL Plus-Minus Award: 1
- Ted Lindsay Award: 2
- Vezina Trophy: 9
- William M. Jennings Trophy: 3

Total
- Awards won: 37

This is a list of Buffalo Sabres award winners.

== League awards ==
=== Team trophies ===
Team trophies awarded to the Buffalo Sabres
Award	Description	Times won	Seasons	References
Prince of Wales Trophy	Wales Conference regular season championship (1974–81)	2	1974–75, 1979–80	
Prince of Wales Trophy	Wales/Eastern Conference playoff championship (1981–present)	1	1998–99	
Presidents' Trophy	Most regular season points	1	2006–07	

=== Individual awards ===
Individual awards won by Buffalo Sabres players and staff
Award	Description	Winner	Season	References
Bill Masterton Memorial Trophy	Perseverance, sportsmanship and dedication to hockey	Don Luce	1974–75	
Bill Masterton Memorial Trophy	Perseverance, sportsmanship and dedication to hockey	Pat LaFontaine	1994–95	
Calder Memorial Trophy	Rookie of the year	Gilbert Perreault	1970–71	
Calder Memorial Trophy	Rookie of the year	Tom Barrasso	1983–84	
Calder Memorial Trophy	Rookie of the year	Tyler Myers	2009–10	
Frank J. Selke Trophy	Forward who best excels in the defensive aspect of the game	Craig Ramsay	1984–85	
Frank J. Selke Trophy	Forward who best excels in the defensive aspect of the game	Michael Peca	1996–97	
Hart Memorial Trophy	Most valuable player to his team during the regular season	Dominik Hasek	1996–97	
Hart Memorial Trophy	Most valuable player to his team during the regular season	Dominik Hasek	1997–98	
Jack Adams Award	Top coach during the regular season	Ted Nolan	1996–97	
Jack Adams Award	Top coach during the regular season	Lindy Ruff	2005–06	
King Clancy Memorial Trophy	Leadership qualities on and off the ice and humanitarian contributions within their community	Rob Ray	1998–99	
Lady Byng Memorial Trophy	Gentlemanly conduct	Gilbert Perreault	1972–73	
NHL Foundation Player Award	Community service	Rob Ray	1998–99	
NHL Foundation Player Award	Community service	Ryan Miller	2009–10	
NHL Plus-Minus Award	Highest plus/minus	Thomas Vanek	2006–07	
Ted Lindsay Award	Most valuable player as chosen by the players	Dominik Hasek	1996–97	
Ted Lindsay Award	Most valuable player as chosen by the players	Dominik Hasek	1997–98	
Vezina Trophy	Fewest goals given up in the regular season (1927–81)	Don Edwards	1979–80	
Vezina Trophy	Fewest goals given up in the regular season (1927–81)	Bob Sauve	1979–80	
Vezina Trophy	Top goaltender (1981–present)	Tom Barrasso	1983–84	
Vezina Trophy	Top goaltender (1981–present)	Dominik Hasek	1993–94	
Vezina Trophy	Top goaltender (1981–present)	Dominik Hasek	1994–95	
Vezina Trophy	Top goaltender (1981–present)	Dominik Hasek	1996–97	
Vezina Trophy	Top goaltender (1981–present)	Dominik Hasek	1997–98	
Vezina Trophy	Top goaltender (1981–present)	Dominik Hasek	1998–99	
Vezina Trophy	Top goaltender (1981–present)	Dominik Hasek	2000–01	
Vezina Trophy	Top goaltender (1981–present)	Ryan Miller	2009–10	
William M. Jennings Trophy	Fewest goals given up in the regular season (1981–present)	Tom Barrasso	1984–85	
William M. Jennings Trophy	Fewest goals given up in the regular season (1981–present)	Bob Sauve	1984–85	
William M. Jennings Trophy	Fewest goals given up in the regular season (1981–present)	Grant Fuhr	1993–94	
William M. Jennings Trophy	Fewest goals given up in the regular season (1981–present)	Dominik Hasek	1993–94	
William M. Jennings Trophy	Fewest goals given up in the regular season (1981–present)	Dominik Hasek	2000–01	

== All-Stars ==
=== NHL first and second team All-Stars ===
The NHL first and second team All-Stars are the top players at each position as voted on by the Professional Hockey Writers' Association.

Buffalo Sabres selected to the NHL First and Second Team All-Stars
Player	Position	Selections	Season	Team
Tom Barrasso	Goaltender	2	1983–84	1st
Tom Barrasso	Goaltender	2	1984–85	2nd
Rasmus Dahlin	Defense	1	2025–26	2nd
Don Edwards	Goaltender	2	1977–78	2nd
Don Edwards	Goaltender	2	1979–80	2nd
Danny Gare	Right Wing	1	1979–80	2nd
Dominik Hasek	Goaltender	6	1993–94	1st
Dominik Hasek	Goaltender	6	1994–95	1st
Dominik Hasek	Goaltender	6	1996–97	1st
Dominik Hasek	Goaltender	6	1997–98	1st
Dominik Hasek	Goaltender	6	1998–99	1st
Dominik Hasek	Goaltender	6	2000–01	1st
Pat LaFontaine	Center	1	1992–93	2nd
Rick Martin	Left Wing	4	1973–74	1st
Rick Martin	Left Wing	4	1974–75	1st
Rick Martin	Left Wing	4	1975–76	2nd
Rick Martin	Left Wing	4	1976–77	2nd
Ryan Miller	Goaltender	1	2009–10	1st
Alexander Mogilny	Right Wing	1	1992–93	2nd
Gilbert Perreault	Center	2	1975–76	2nd
Gilbert Perreault	Center	2	1976–77	2nd
Daren Puppa	Goaltender	1	1989–90	2nd
Rene Robert	Right Wing	1	1974–75	2nd
Jim Schoenfeld	Defense	1	1979–80	2nd
Thomas Vanek	Left Wing	1	2006–07	2nd

=== NHL All-Rookie Team ===
The NHL All-Rookie Team consists of the top rookies at each position as voted on by the Professional Hockey Writers' Association.

Buffalo Sabres selected to the NHL All-Rookie Team
Player	Position	Season
Tom Barrasso	Goaltender	1983–84
Rasmus Dahlin	Defense	2018–19
Jack Eichel	Forward	2015–16
Jhonas Enroth	Goaltender	2011–12
Phil Housley	Defense	1982–83
Calle Johansson	Defense	1987–88
Tyler Myers	Defense	2009–10
Victor Olofsson	Forward	2019–20
Owen Power	Defense	2022–23
Ray Sheppard	Forward	1987–88

=== All-Star Game selections ===
The National Hockey League All-Star Game is a mid-season exhibition game held annually between many of the top players of each season. Forty-one All-Star Games have been held since the Sabres entered the league in 1970, with at least one player chosen to represent the Sabres in each year except 2004 and 2011. The All-Star game has not been held in various years: 1979 and 1987 due to the 1979 Challenge Cup and Rendez-vous '87 series between the NHL and the Soviet national team, respectively, 1995, 2005, and 2013 as a result of labor stoppages, 2006, 2010, 2014 and 2026 because of the Winter Olympic Games, 2021 as a result of the COVID-19 pandemic, and 2025 when it was replaced by the 2025 4 Nations Face-Off. Buffalo has hosted one of the games. The 31st took place at Buffalo Memorial Auditorium.

- † Selected by fan vote
- # Selected as one of four "last men in" by fan vote
- ↑ All-Star Game Most Valuable Player

Buffalo Sabres players and coaches selected to the All-Star Game
Game	Year	Name	Position	References
24th	1971	Gilbert Perreault	Center	
25th	1972	Rick Martin	Left Wing	
25th	1972	Gilbert Perreault	Center	
26th	1973	Rick Martin	Left Wing	
26th	1973	Rene Robert	Right Wing	
27th	1974	Dave Dryden	Goaltender	
27th	1974	Rick Martin	Left Wing	
27th	1974	Gilbert Perreault (Did not play)	Center	
28th	1975	Jerry Korab	Defense	
28th	1975	Don Luce	Center	
28th	1975	Rick Martin	Left Wing	
28th	1975	Rene Robert	Right Wing	
29th	1976	Jerry Korab	Defense	
29th	1976	Rick Martin	Left Wing	
29th	1976	Craig Ramsay	Left Wing	
29th	1976	Floyd Smith	Coach	
30th	1977	Gerry Desjardins	Goaltender	
30th	1977	Rick Martin↑	Left Wing	
30th	1977	Gilbert Perreault	Center	
30th	1977	Jim Schoenfeld	Defense	
31st	1978	Rick Martin	Left Wing	
31st	1978	Gilbert Perreault	Center	
32nd	1980	Don Edwards	Goaltender	
32nd	1980	Danny Gare	Right Wing	
32nd	1980	Gilbert Perreault	Center	
32nd	1980	Jim Schoenfeld	Defense	
33rd	1981	Scotty Bowman	Coach	
33rd	1981	Danny Gare	Right Wing	
33rd	1981	Bill Hajt (Did not play)	Defense	
34th	1982	Mike Ramsey	Defense	
34th	1982	John Van Boxmeer (Did not play)	Defense	
35th	1983	Mike Ramsey	Defense	
36th	1984	Phil Housley	Defense	
36th	1984	Gilbert Perreault	Center	
37th	1985	Tom Barrasso	Goaltender	
37th	1985	Bill Hajt (Did not play)	Defense	
37th	1985	Mike Ramsey	Defense	
38th	1986	Mike Ramsey	Defense	
39th	1988	Christian Ruuttu	Center	
40th	1989	Phil Housley	Defense	
41st	1990	Dave Andreychuk	Left Wing	
41st	1990	Phil Housley	Defense	
41st	1990	Daren Puppa	Goaltender	
41st	1990	Pierre Turgeon	Center	
42nd	1991	Uwe Krupp	Defense	
43rd	1992	Alexander Mogilny	Right Wing	
44th	1993	Pat LaFontaine	Center	
44th	1993	Alexander Mogilny	Right Wing	
45th	1994	Alexander Mogilny†	Right Wing	
46th	1996	Dominik Hasek	Goaltender	
47th	1997	Dominik Hasek	Goaltender	
48th	1998	Dominik Hasek†	Goaltender	
49th	1999	Dominik Hasek†	Goaltender	
49th	1999	Lindy Ruff	Coach	
49th	1999	Alexei Zhitnik	Defense	
50th	2000	Dominik Hasek† (Did not play)	Goaltender	
50th	2000	Miroslav Satan	Left Wing	
51st	2001	Dominik Hasek†	Goaltender	
52nd	2002	Alexei Zhitnik	Defense	
53rd	2003	Miroslav Satan	Right Wing	
54th	2004	No Sabres selected	—	
55th	2007	Daniel Briere†↑	Center	
55th	2007	Brian Campbell†	Defense	
55th	2007	Ryan Miller†	Goaltender	
55th	2007	Lindy Ruff	Coach	
56th	2008	Brian Campbell	Defense	
57th	2009	Thomas Vanek	Left Wing	
58th	2011	No Sabres selected	—	
59th	2012	Jason Pominville	Right Wing	
60th	2015	Zemgus Girgensons†	Center	
61st	2016	Ryan O'Reilly	Center	
62nd	2017	Kyle Okposo	Right Wing	
63rd	2018	Jack Eichel	Center	
64th	2019	Jack Eichel	Center	
64th	2019	Jeff Skinner#	Left Wing	
65th	2020	Jack Eichel	Center	
66th	2022	Rasmus Dahlin	Defense	
67th	2023	Rasmus Dahlin (Replaced Thompson)	Defense	
67th	2023	Tage Thompson (Did not play)	Center	
68th	2024	Rasmus Dahlin	Defense	

=== All-Star Game replacement events ===
Buffalo Sabres players and coaches selected to All-Star Game replacement events
Event	Year	Name	Position	References
Challenge Cup	1979	Gilbert Perreault	Center	
Challenge Cup	1979	Jim Schoenfeld (Did not play)	Defense	
Rendez-vous '87	1987	Mike Ramsey	Defense	
4 Nations Face-Off	2025	Rasmus Dahlin (Sweden)	Defense	
4 Nations Face-Off	2025	Henri Jokiharju (Finland)	Defense	
4 Nations Face-Off	2025	Ukko-Pekka Luukkonen (Finland)	Goaltender	

== Career achievements ==
=== Hockey Hall of Fame ===
The following is a list of Buffalo Sabres who have been enshrined in the Hockey Hall of Fame.

Buffalo Sabres inducted into the Hockey Hall of Fame
Individual	Category	Year inducted	Years with Sabres in category	References
Dave Andreychuk	Player	2017	1982–1993, 2000–2001	
Tom Barrasso	Player	2023	1983-1988	
Scotty Bowman	Builder	1991	1979–1986	
Dick Duff	Player	2006	1970–1972	
Grant Fuhr	Player	2003	1993–1995	
Clark Gillies	Player	2002	1986–1988	
Doug Gilmour	Player	2001	2000–2001	
Dominik Hasek	Player	2014	1992–2001	
Dale Hawerchuk	Player	2001	1990–1995	
Tim Horton	Player	1977	1972–1974	
Phil Housley	Player	2015	1982–1990	
Punch Imlach	Builder	1984	1970–1978	
Seymour H. Knox III	Builder	1993	1970–1996	
Pat LaFontaine	Player	2003	1991–1997	
Alexander Mogilny	Player	2025	1989-1995	
Gilbert Perreault	Player	1990	1970–1987	
Pierre Turgeon	Player	2023	1987-1991	

=== Foster Hewitt Memorial Award ===
Three members of the Buffalo Sabres organization have been honored with the Foster Hewitt Memorial Award. The award is presented by the Hockey Hall of Fame to members of the radio and television industry who make outstanding contributions to their profession and the game of ice hockey during their broadcasting career.

Members of the Buffalo Sabres honored with the Foster Hewitt Memorial Award
Individual	Year honored	Years with Sabres as broadcaster	References
Ted Darling	1994	1970–1993	
Rick Jeanneret	2012	1971–2022	
Harry Neale	2013	2007–2013	

=== Lester Patrick Trophy ===
The Lester Patrick Trophy has been presented by the National Hockey League and USA Hockey since 1966 to honor a recipient's contribution to ice hockey in the United States. This list includes all personnel who have ever been employed by the Buffalo Sabres in any capacity and have also received the Lester Patrick Trophy.

Members of the Buffalo Sabres honored with the Lester Patrick Trophy
Individual	Year honored	Years with Sabres	References
Seymour H. Knox III	1997	1970–1996	
Pat LaFontaine	1997	1991–1997	

=== United States Hockey Hall of Fame ===
Members of the Buffalo Sabres inducted into the United States Hockey Hall of Fame
Individual	Year inducted	Years with Sabres	References
Tom Barrasso	2009	1983–1988	
Red Berenson	2018	1982–1984	
Chris Drury	2015	2003–2007	
Brian Gionta	2019	2014–2017	
Phil Housley	2004	1982–1990	
Pat LaFontaine	2003	1991–1997	
Reed Larson	1996	1990	
Peter McNab	2021	1973-1976	
Ryan Miller	2022	2002-2014	
Mike Ramsey	2001	1979–1993	

=== Retired numbers ===
The Buffalo Sabres have retired seven of their jersey numbers. Also out of circulation is the number 99 which was retired league-wide for Wayne Gretzky on February 6, 2000. Gretzky did not play for the Sabres during his 20-year NHL career and no Sabres player had ever worn the number 99 prior to its retirement.

Buffalo Sabres retired numbers
Number	Player	Position	Years with Sabres as a player	Date of retirement ceremony	References
2	Tim Horton	Defense	1972–1974	January 5, 1996	
7	Rick Martin	Left Wing	1971–1981	November 15, 1995	
11	Gilbert Perreault	Center	1970–1987	October 17, 1990	
14	Rene Robert	Right Wing	1972–1979	November 15, 1995	
16	Pat LaFontaine	Center	1991–1997	March 3, 2006	
18	Danny Gare	Right Wing	1974–1981	November 22, 2005	
30	Ryan Miller	Goaltender	2002-2014	January 19, 2023	
39	Dominik Hasek	Goaltender	1992–2001	January 13, 2015	

=== Buffalo Sabres Hall of Fame ===
Induction into the Buffalo Sabres Hall of Fame is "the highest honor bestowed by the Buffalo Sabres."

Year	Inductee
1980	Frank Christie
1980	Roger Crozier
1980	Punch Imlach
1982	Tim Horton
1982	Fred Hunt
1986	David Forman
1986	Don Luce
1986	Craig Ramsay
1989	Rick Martin
1989	Gilbert Perreault
1989	Rene Robert
1994	Danny Gare
1995	Jim Schoenfeld
1995	Robert O. Swados

Year	Inductee
1996	Ted Darling
1996	Seymour H. Knox III
1996	Northrup R. Knox
1998	Larry Playfair
1998	Jack Gatecliff
2000	Don Edwards
2000	Bill Hajt
2000	Wayne Redshaw
2000	Robert "Rip" Simonick
2001	Jerry Korab
2001	Mike Racicot
2001	Mike Ramsey
2004	Mike Foligno
2004	Dick Johnston

Year	Inductee
2004	Pat LaFontaine
2004	Rudy Migay
2004	Robert E. Rich Jr.
2004	George Strawbridge
2007	Phil Housley
2008	Dave Andreychuk
2008	Milt Ellis
2010	Jim Lorentz
2010	Joe Crozier
2011	Jim Kelley
2011	Alexander Mogilny
2012	Rick Jeanneret
2012	Dale Hawerchuk
2014	Dominik Hasek
2023	Ryan Miller
2025	Rob Ray

== Other awards ==
Buffalo Sabres who have received non-NHL awards
Award	Description	Winner	Season	References
Best NHL Player ESPY Award	Best NHL player of the last calendar year	Dominik Hasek	1999	
Best NHL Player ESPY Award	Best NHL player of the last calendar year	Dominik Hasek	2000	
Charlie Conacher Humanitarian Award	For humanitarian or community service projects	Jim Lorentz	1976–77	
Golden Hockey Stick	Best Czech ice hockey player	Dominik Hasek	1996–97	
Golden Hockey Stick	Best Czech ice hockey player	Dominik Hasek	1997–98	
Rick Martin Memorial Award	Presented annually to the player whom fans believe best embodies what it means to be a Buffalo Sabre, through on-ice excellence, resiliency, and dedication to the community.	Sam Reinhart	2020-21	
Rick Martin Memorial Award	Presented annually to the player whom fans believe best embodies what it means to be a Buffalo Sabre, through on-ice excellence, resiliency, and dedication to the community.	Kyle Okposo	2021-22	
Rick Martin Memorial Award	Presented annually to the player whom fans believe best embodies what it means to be a Buffalo Sabre, through on-ice excellence, resiliency, and dedication to the community.	Alex Tuch	2022-23 2023-24 2024-25	
Rick Martin Memorial Award	Presented annually to the player whom fans believe best embodies what it means to be a Buffalo Sabre, through on-ice excellence, resiliency, and dedication to the community.	Rasmus Dahlin	2025-26	

== See also ==
- List of National Hockey League awards
