= Harry Preston (field hockey) =

Canadian field hockey player (1931–2004)

Harry Preston (July 25, 1931 – May 23, 2004) was a Canadian field hockey and lacrosse player who competed in the 1964 Summer Olympics. He grew up in Surrey, British Columbia and attended Queen Elizabeth Secondary School before studying at the University of British Columbia.

Preston played Senior 'A' lacrosse in the Inter-City Lacrosse league for the New Westminster Salmonbellies from 1947 through until 1958. In 1959, he suited up for the Vancouver Carlings. He made a comeback in 1968 with Coquitlam, then played with New Westminster the following year before closing out his career in 1970 back with Coquitlam Adanacs. He appeared in a total of 220 regular season games for a save average of 70.0%. He also played in 17 playoffs games and had a 71.7% save average for the post-season.

He continued to play and coach lacrosse until fall of 2003, playing for the Port Coquitlam Masters Box and Field Lacrosse Teams. Harry also played goal in field hockey for Canada at the 1964 Tokyo Olympics as well as the 1967 and 1971 Pan-American Games.

Preston was inducted into the Canadian Lacrosse Hall of Fame in 1993 as a builder.
