= Fred Wooster =

Canadian lacrosse executive

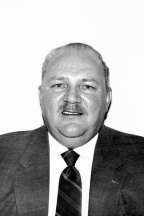
Fred L. J. Wooster.

Fred L. J. Wooster (5 January 1938 – 1 November 1993) was one of the founders of the Saanich Lacrosse Association in Saanich, British Columbia, and a well known local figure for lacrosse. Wooster devoted much of his time and work behind the scenes organizing box lacrosse clubs and developing players in the Victoria, British Columbia area. Notably, Wooster played for the Victoria Shamrocks during the 1950s and early 1960s, maintaining ties to the organisation throughout his life. He also held executive positions with the British Columbia Lacrosse Association, including president from 1972 to 1973. In 1987, Fred Wooster was inducted into the Canadian Lacrosse Hall of Fame.
