= Alexander Turnbull (lacrosse) =

Canadian lacrosse player

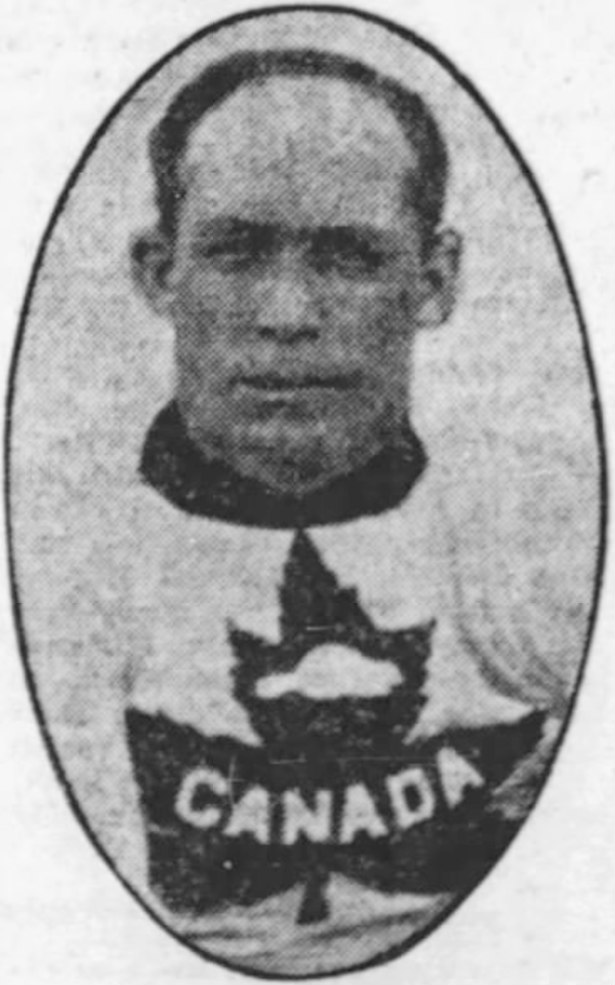
- Turnbull with the Canadian national lacrosse team

Personal information
- Birth name: Alexander Thomas Turnbull
- Nickname: Dad
- National team: Canada
- Born: December 6, 1872; Stratford, Ontario, Canada
- Died: August 27, 1956 (aged 73); Burnaby, British Columbia, Canada

Sport
- Sport: Lacrosse

Achievements and titles
- Olympic finals: 1908

Olympic medal record

Men's lacrosse

Representing Canada
Gold medal – first place	1908 London	Team

Alexander Thomas Turnbull (December 6, 1863 or 1872 – August 27, 1956) was a Canadian lacrosse player who competed and won gold in the 1908 Summer Olympics.

== Biography ==
Alex Turnbull was born in Stratford, Ontario and died in Burnaby, British Columbia. For most of his career, "Dad" Turnbull gained his fame playing in the home (midfield) and outside home (attack) positions, although when he first started playing senior in Ontario, it was as a defensive player. He played his first senior matches in 1884 in Toronto. He bounced around teams in Toronto and Paris, Ontario for six years before landing in Brockville in 1890. He played with Brockville and then Perth until 1894. In 1896, he found himself playing with an assortment of Toronto-based teams: the Elms, West Toronto, and then the Tecumsehs. In the fall of 1897, Turnbull moved to British Columbia—first to Rossland and then onwards to New Westminster where he would launch a 14-season career [spanning from 1897 to 1909, followed by a comeback in 1918] with the Salmonbellies. He played professional lacrosse for New Westminster Salmonbellies in 1909 and 1918, in which he scored 5 goals in 13 matches over those two seasons.

Turnbull was regarded back in the day as quite healthy for his age and a model athlete for his diet and regimen. Notable for the time, he never drank and rarely smoked, and he was praised in newspapers such as the Ottawa Citizen for his temperance and "clean living". He had to stop playing in 1909 after suffering two broken ribs during a game but made a comeback in 1918 at age 46.

In later years, he was employed as the warden at the provincial jail (a separate complex from BC Penitentiary). On April 3, 1911, he was shot in the leg while on the job when a guard's revolver accidentally exploded.

In 1965, he was inducted as a charter member to the Canadian Lacrosse Hall of Fame. Two years later he was inducted into the British Columbia Sports Hall of Fame.

== Discrepancies with Turnbull's age ==
"Dad" Turnbull was almost always noted in contemporary newspapers of his day for his remarkable, advanced playing age. However, there appear to be discrepancies reconciling the birth year of 1872, the usual given year, with the start of his playing career in 1884.

The Montréal Gazette noted in a 1908 article that he was aged 44 at the time of publication (on July 31, 1908), and he would be 45 as of September of that year, implying he was born in 1863. It also would imply a different birthdate from that of December 6. This 1863 birth year would, however, better correspond with his senior playing career beginning in 1884 because otherwise, he would have been 12 (if born in 1872) when he started playing senior lacrosse.

In an Ottawa Citizen reprint of a Vancouver Daily Province article in 1917, his age at retirement in 1910 was quoted as being 42, which would then imply a birth year of 1868 thereabouts.
