= Stan Shillington =

Canadian sports historian (1935–2025)

- Born: January 21, 1935; Vancouver, British Columbia, Canada
- Died: December 8, 2025 (aged 90); Burnaby, British Columbia, Canada
- Spouse: Barbara Nyberg
- Children: 3

Stanley Stephen Shillington (January 21, 1935 – December 8, 2025) was a Canadian lacrosse historian, sportswriter and statistician. Throughout his career, Shillington was the scorekeeper for a total of 971 games, including regular season, playoffs, and Mann Cup games. He was inducted into the Canadian Lacrosse Hall of Fame as a builder in 1977.

== Career ==
As a kid growing up in Vancouver, Shillington saw his first senior lacrosse game during the 1946–47 season. He began playing junior lacrosse under the direction of Reginald "Pop" Phillips. Although he enjoyed playing lacrosse, Shillington was forced to quit to take a job as a night copy boy at the Vancouver Sun. To increase his income, he also wrote one-paragraph game reports on minor and junior lacrosse games, then started adding league stats every couple of weeks.

Shillington then accepted a job as the newspapers police reporter and researcher with the Joint Coordinated Law Enforcement Unit. Despite this, he still kept a log of statistics on lacrosse games as a hobby. Shillington later recounted the 1951 Mann Cup between the Peterborough Timbermen and Vancouver Combines, dubbing it the Mann Cup Follies for the league's "continually flip-flopped in its decision-making" and intolerable conditions the players played in.

In 1953, Shillington became one of the founders of the Renfrew Athletic Club and later the Fraser Lacrosse Commission. While working as Secretary of the Renfrew Athletic Club in 1954, he was contacted by Art Daoust, head of the Lacrosse Junior league, to record stats for the league and write the occasional story. After proving to be successful at this task, Shillington was contacted by Tom Gordon, head of Inter City Lacrosse League (ICLL), in 1957, to be the ICLL statistician. His position with the ICLL began with the Vancouver Minor Association in 1955–1960. In total, he spent 31 seasons as league statistician with the ICLL and Western Lacrosse Association (WLA). Shillington would later be named the Official Canadian Lacrosse Association Mann Cup Statistician. Shillington recounted having to once score a game from the penalty box while two players attacked each other with sticks over his head. In 1970, he was awarded the Art Daoust Merit Award. In 1977 he was inducted into the Canadian Lacrosse Hall of Fame as a builder. In 1980, Shillington awarded the Norm Kowalyk Trophy as Executive Of The Year by the Western Lacrosse Association. That same year, he published Who's Who In Lacrosse.

Due to his statistical background, Shillington was asked to help two Ontario historians in 2002 research lost statistical information from Ontario Senior “A” lacrosse games that were never recorded or compiled. Beginning in 2008, the Western Lacrosse Association's CKNW "TOP DOG" Trophy for the Winners of League Play was replaced by the Stan Shillington Trophy.

In 2011, Shillington was inducted in the second induction class of the Canada's Sports Hall of Fame. He was also inducted into the Coquitlam Sports Hall of Fame. In 2019, Doug Luey, Major Series Lacrosse commissioner and president of the Jr. B Green Gaels said, “If it wasn’t for him [Larry Power] and his efforts and Stan Shillington in B.C., there would be no lacrosse records.” He died of complications of dementia on December 8, 2025, in Burnaby, British Columbia.
