= Fred Waghorne =

Canadian ice hockey referee and organizer (1865–1956)

Frederick Charles Albert Waghorne Sr.
- Born: October 16, 1865; Tunbridge Wells, England
- Died: June 19, 1956 (aged 90)
- Occupations: ice hockey referee & organizer, lacrosse referee

Frederick Charles Albert "Old Wag" Waghorne Sr. (October 16, 1865 – June 19, 1956) was an ice hockey referee and organizer in Canada. He also made significant contributions to lacrosse in that country. He is a member of both the Hockey Hall of Fame and the Canadian Lacrosse Hall of Fame in the "Builder" category.

== League organization ==
Waghorne was born in Tunbridge Wells, England and then moved to Canada. While mainly interested in rugby as a youth, he became interested in lacrosse and ice hockey and eventually started the Toronto Lacrosse Hockey League. This league started out fielding lacrosse teams in the summer and hockey teams in the winter, but as the popularity of hockey grew the league became simply the Toronto Hockey League.

When the Toronto Hockey League disbanded, Waghorne continued to work to provide opportunities for hockey players at all levels. In 1911, he formed the Beaches Hockey League which eventually became the Greater Toronto Hockey League, the largest minor league hockey organization in the world.

== Officiating ==
Waghorne is best known for his prolific career as a referee. He is known to have officiated 2,400 hockey games and 1,500 lacrosse matches. Many of the decisions he made on the ice rink became long-term rules in both amateur and professional ice hockey. Waghorne is credited with several changes and innovations to ice hockey rules, such as:

- The use of a whistle instead of the customary cow bell to stop play when fans started bringing their own cowbells to disrupt game play.
- The acceptance of professional referees in amateur hockey games.
- The practice of dropping the puck from a few feet up at faceoff rather than placing it directly on the ice, which limited player contact with the referee's shins and ankles during faceoffs.
- The ruling that if a half of a broken hockey puck entered the net, no goal was counted - a rule that led to the development of one-piece pucks.

== Honors ==
Waghorne was involved with ice hockey and lacrosse until his death in 1956 at the age of 90. He was elected to the Hockey Hall of Fame in 1961, and to the Canadian Lacrosse Hall of Fame in 1965.
