= Jack Gatecliff =

Canadian sports journalist, ice hockey and lacrosse player

- Born: April 20, 1926; St. Catharines, Ontario, Canada
- Died: September 5, 2000 (aged 74)
- Occupation: Journalist
- Years active: 1950–2000
- Awards: Elmer Ferguson Memorial Award

Jack Gatecliff (April 20, 1926 – September 5, 2000) was a Canadian sports journalist, ice hockey and lacrosse player. He was awarded the Elmer Ferguson Memorial Award by the Hockey Hall of Fame in 1995. He is also an inducted member of the St. Catharines Sports Hall of Fame, Canadian Lacrosse Hall of Fame, and Buffalo Sabres Hall of Fame. In 1996, the Garden City Arena was renamed to honour him.

== Early life ==
Gatecliff was born in St. Catharines, Ontario on April 20, 1926. He attended Queen Alexandra Middle School growing up.

== Career ==
Gatecliff played lacrosse and hockey growing up. He was a member of the St. Catharines Falcons Junior A hockey team as a youth and of the St. Catharines Athletics at the age of 18. As a member of the team, Gatecliff won the 1944 Mann Cup Championship. In 1947, Gatecliff moved to Scotland to play hockey for the Paisley Pirates. While in Scotland, Gatecliff decided to pursue a career in journalism and returned to Canada with a job at the St. Catharines Standard.

In 1950, Gatecliff began a sports column titled "Through the Sports Gate" which focused on local sports. He was shortlythereafter promoted to executive sports editor, a position he stayed in until his retirement. Beginning in the 1970s, Gatecliff focused sportswriting on the Buffalo Sabres organization. In 1972, Gatecliff was inducted into the Canadian Lacrosse Hall of Fame. After the 1983–84 American Hockey League season, Gatecliff was awarded the James H. Ellery Memorial Award for outstanding media coverage of the American Hockey League. Following this, he received the Bob Reinhart Memorial Award from the St. Catharines Chamber of Commerce for community service. Gatecliff was also a track announcer at the Merrittville Speedway after broadcaster Rex Stimers retired.

In 1990, Gatecliff helped found the St. Catharines Sports Hall of Fame along with Joe McCaffrey, Ellard O'Brien, Archie Katzman and Bill Stevenson. At the time of his retirement in 1991, the St. Catharines Standard sports department unveiled the Jack Gatecliff Award which is presented to the area person judged to have demonstrated an especially high level of dedication to sports.

He was awarded the Elmer Ferguson Memorial Award by the Hockey Hall of Fame in 1995. The following year, the Garden City Arena was renamed Jack Gatecliff Arena. However, in 2007, the arena was renamed the Gatorade Garden City Complex. Prior to the opening of the Meridian Centre in 2014, the city of St. Catharines dedicated a chair in his honour.

Later, in 1998, Gatecliff was inducted into the Buffalo Sabres Hall of Fame. He continued to write for the St. Catharines Standard until his death on September 5, 2000, from cancer.

== Personal life ==
Gatecliff met his wife Alice McDonald Noble while in Scotland and the two married on September 18, 1948. Alice worked for the St. Catharines Standard as a proof reader before retiring following the birth of their son.
