= Canadian Lacrosse Hall of Fame =

Lacrosse hall of fame in British Columbia, Canada

- Established: November 1965; 60 years ago
- Location: 777 Columbia Street; New Westminster, British Columbia; Canada
- Coordinates: 49.2015°N 122.9114°W
- Website: www.clhof.org

The Canadian Lacrosse Hall of Fame is a Canadian lacrosse hall of fame, located in New Westminster, British Columbia, Canada. The Hall was chartered in 1965 by the Canadian Lacrosse Association, and inducted its first class of hall of famers in the following year.

== History ==
Induction of new members is made on an annual basis. In 1965, three categories were inaugurated: Field Players, Box Players and Builders. A Veteran category was added in 1997 to preserve the memory of stars of yesteryear, and in 1988, an outstanding Team category was also added. Starting in 2016, the box player and field player categories were merged into the Player category with no distinction made between box and field versions of the sport. Due to the COVID-19 pandemic cancelling the induction dinner that year, the 2020 inductees were inducted into the hall in 2021 along with the 2021 inductees. An Officials category, covering on-floor game officials such as referees, was added for the 2022 induction year. Also added for the 2022 induction process was a National selection committee - to better represent aspects of the sport not previously represented well by the existing Eastern and Western selection committees.

== List of Hall of Fame inductees ==
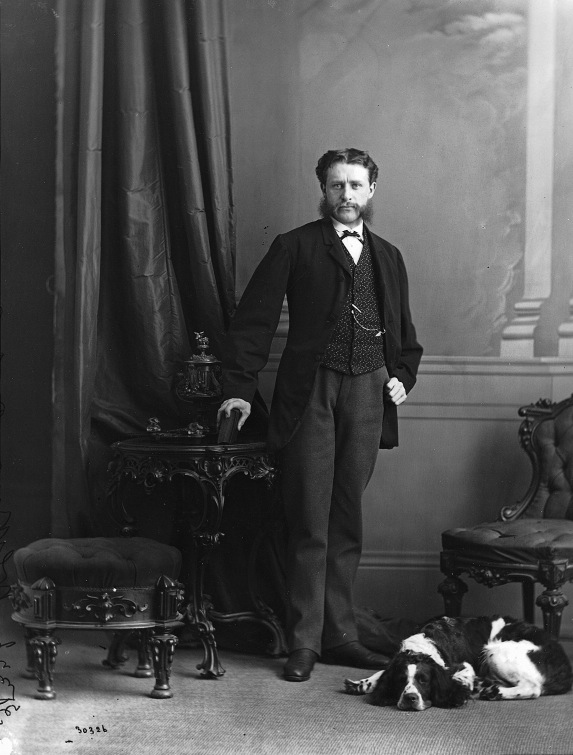
William George Beers, inducted in 1965.

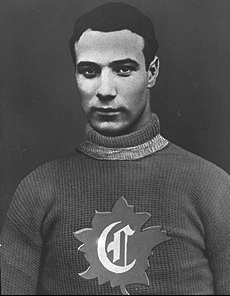
Newsy Lalonde, inducted in 1965.

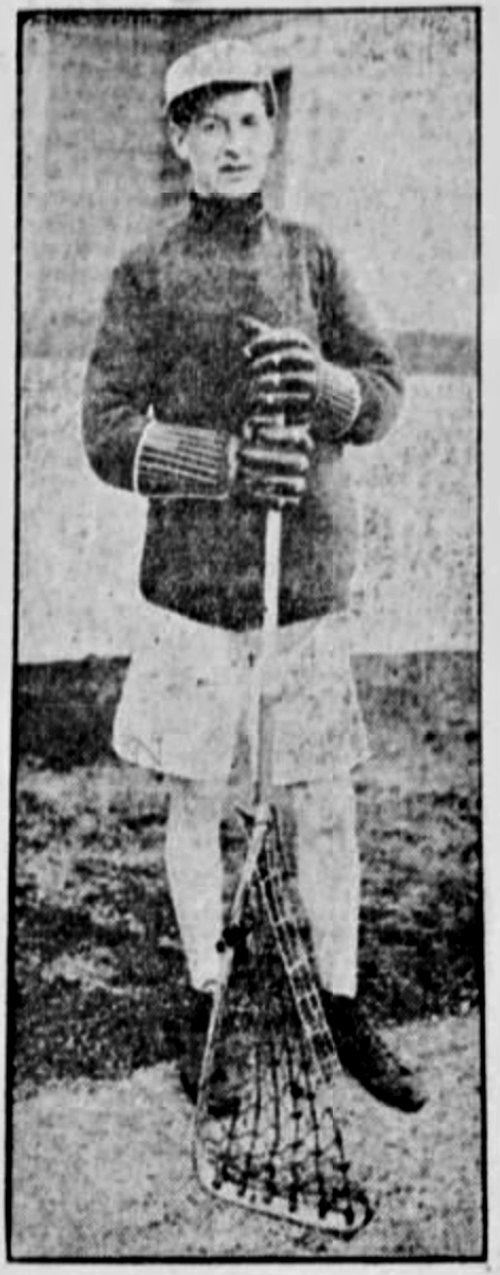
Dave Gibbons, inducted in 1965.

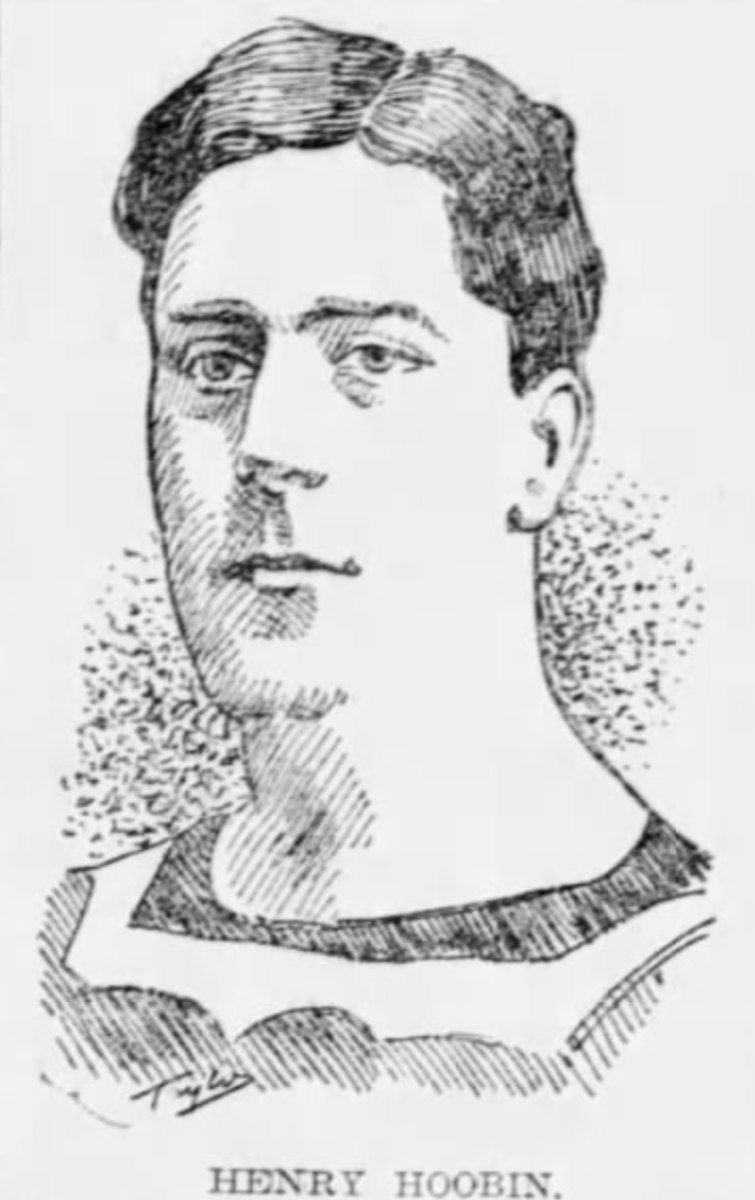
Henry Hoobin, inducted in 1965.

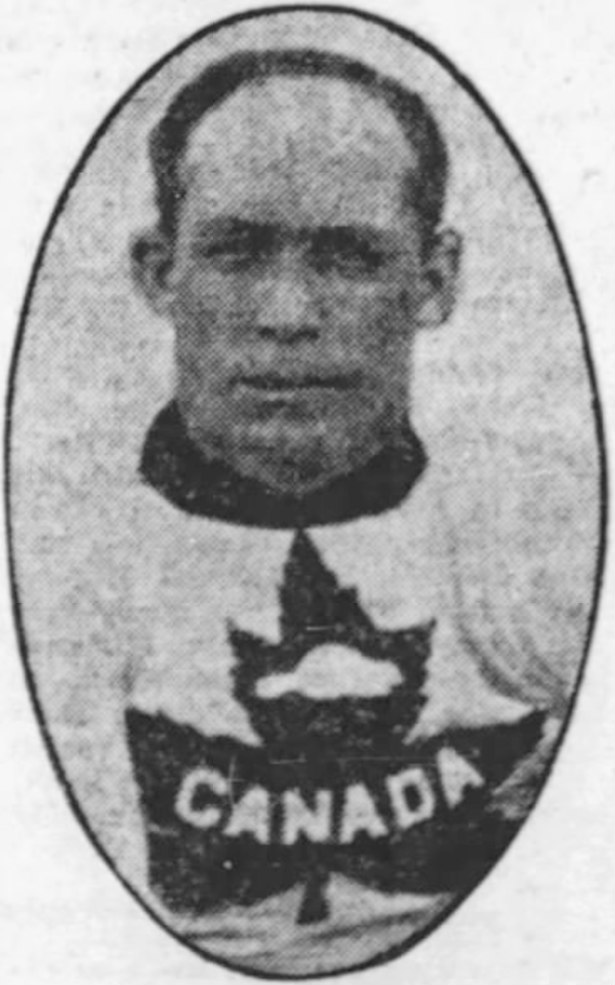
Alex Turnbull, inducted in 1965.

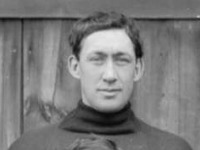
Angus "Bones" Allen, inducted in 1966.

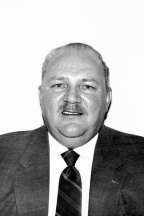
Fred Wooster, inducted in 1987.

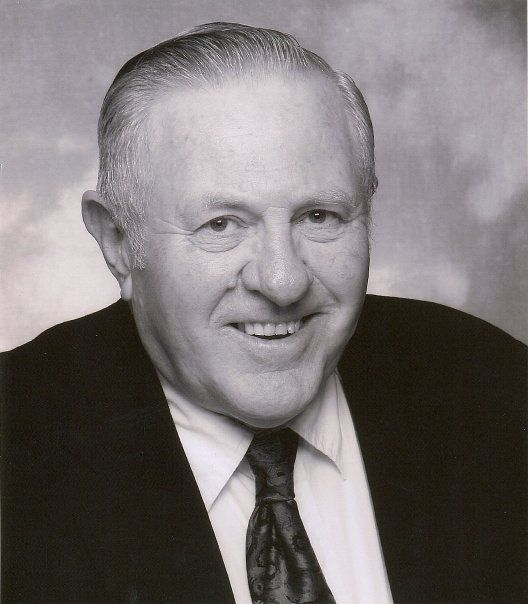
Harry George Woolley, inducted in 2004.

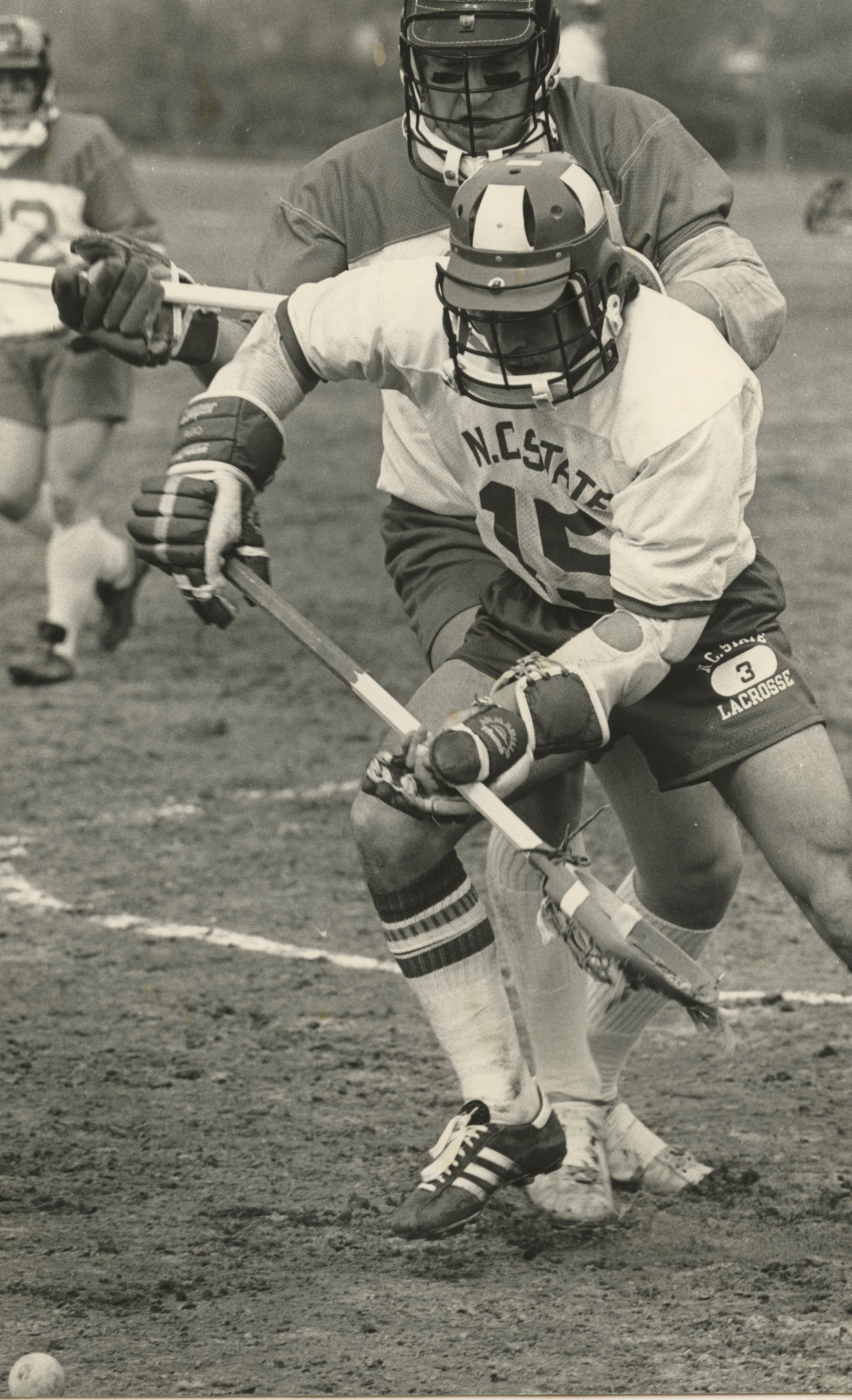
Stan Cockerton, inducted in 2003.

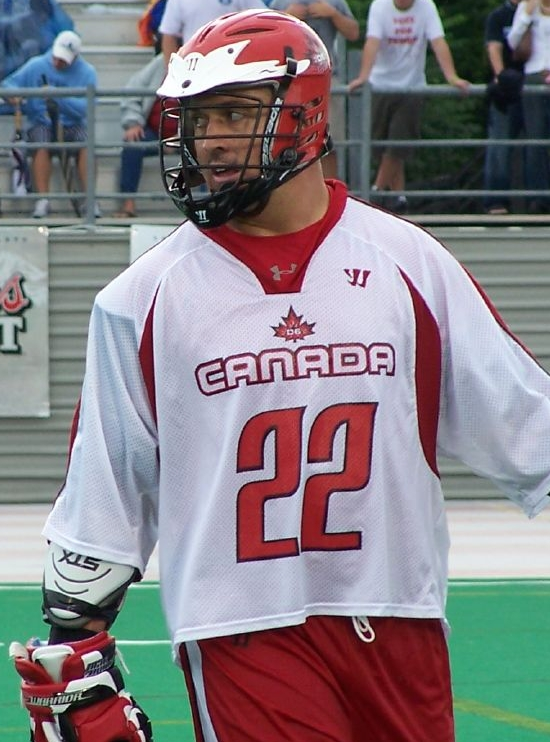
Gary Gait, inducted in 2014.

| Induction year | Player | Inducted as |
|---|---|---|
| 1965 | Fred C. Waghorne, Snr. (1866–1956) | Builder |
| 1965 | Lionel "Big Train" Conacher (1900–1954) | Field Player |
| 1965 | Édouard "Newsy" Lalonde (1887–1970) | Field Player |
| 1965 | Bill Anthony (1913–1978) | Box Player |
| 1965 | Henry "Hawkeye" Baker | Box Player |
| 1965 | Dr. William George Beers (1843–1900) | Builder |
| 1965 | Alban "Bun" Clark (1883–????) | Field Player |
| 1965 | John "Dot" Crookall (1889–1965) | Field Player |
| 1965 | Dr. W.A Dafoe | Builder |
| 1965 | Alfred "Alfie" Davy | Box Player |
| 1965 | Bill Dickinson | Box Player |
| 1965 | E.J. "Gene" Dopp | Builder |
| 1965 | Jim Douglas | Box Player |
| 1965 | William J. "Billy" Fitzgerald (1888–1926) | Field Player |
| 1965 | David Gibbons (1884–1966) | Field Player |
| 1965 | James "Jimmy" Gifford (1886–1976) | Field Player |
| 1965 | Rudolph Martin "Rudy" Grauer (1890–1972) | Builder |
| 1965 | Norman Harshaw | Field Player |
| 1965 | Henry Hoobin (1879–1921) | Field Player |
| 1965 | Frederick (Fred) J. Hume (1892–1967) | Builder |
| 1965 | Bill Isaacs (1914–1985) | Box Player |
| 1965 | Con Jones (1869–1929) | Builder |
| 1965 | George Kalls (1884–1958) | Field Player |
| 1965 | M.E.F. "Mike" Kelley | Builder |
| 1965 | Joe Lally (1863–1956) | Builder |
| 1965 | Edward Longfellow | Field Player |
| 1965 | Carl "Gus" Madsen (1915–1961) | Field Player |
| 1965 | Pat Maitland | Builder |
| 1965 | George Matheson (1879–1961) | Field Player |
| 1965 | William "Bill" McArthur | Field Player |
| 1965 | J.A. "Jim" McConaghy | Builder |
| 1965 | Jack McDonald | Builder |
| 1965 | Dan McKenzie | Builder |
| 1965 | Bill Morphett | Box player |
| 1965 | Jim Murphy | Builder |
| 1965 | Ernie Murray | Field Player |
| 1965 | Clarence "Biscuits" Peele (1874–1933) | Field Player |
| 1965 | Harry Pickering (1881–1936) | Field Player |
| 1965 | Charles Querrie (1877–1950) | Field Player |
| 1965 | Edward "Ted" Reeve (1902–1983) | Field Player |
| 1965 | George Rennie (1883–1966) | Field Player |
| 1965 | Clifford (Cliff) "Doughy" Spring (1888–1974) | Field Player |
| 1965 | George Sproule | Field Player |
| 1965 | Alex "Dad" Turnbull (1863–1956) | Field Player |
| 1965 | Eric "Rusty" White | Box Player |
| 1965 | Bill Wilkes | Box Player |
| 1965 | Bill Wilson | Box Player |
| 1965 | Lloyd "Moon" Wootton (1927–1989) | Box Player |
| 1966 | Doug Favell (1924–1999) | Box Player |
| 1966 | Angus Joseph "Bones" Allen (1881–1941) | Field Player |
| 1966 | Ed Bayley | Builder |
| 1966 | Patty "Paddy" Brennan (1877–1961) | Field Player |
| 1966 | John Cavallin (1915–2002) | Box Player |
| 1966 | Archie Dixon | Box Player |
| 1966 | Ed Downey | Box Player |
| 1966 | James "Pat" Feeney (1886–1948) | Field Player |
| 1966 | Norm Gair | Builder |
| 1966 | Tom "Sharkey" Gifford (1880–1966) | Field Player |
| 1966 | Bob Lee | Box player |
| 1966 | Ed McDermott | Builder |
| 1966 | Merv McKenzie | Builder |
| 1966 | John "Wandy" McMahon | Box Player |
| 1966 | Harry S. "Sport" Murton | Field Player |
| 1966 | Andy Paull (1892–1959) | Builder |
| 1966 | Charles "Chuck" Rowan | Builder |
| 1966 | Gordon "Grumpy" Spring (1889–1949) | Builder |
| 1966 | Gord Thom | Field Player |
| 1967 | Ambrose "Ray" Baker (1898–1983) | Box player |
| 1967 | Erwin E. Barnes | Builder |
| 1967 | Pete Barnett (1886–1965) | Field player |
| 1967 | Stewart "Stew" Beatty | Field player |
| 1967 | Albert "Ab" Brown | Builder |
| 1967 | Joe Cheevers | Box player |
| 1967 | Bill Coulter | Field player |
| 1967 | John Dale | Box player |
| 1967 | Charles "Chuck" Davidson | Box player |
| 1967 | Fred Jacob | Builder |
| 1967 | Russell T. Kelly | Builder |
| 1967 | Bert Large | Field player |
| 1967 | Walter "Walt" Lee | Box player |
| 1967 | David "Buck" Marshall (1887–1975) | Field player |
| 1967 | Lionel Edward 'Leo' Nicholson (1894–1947) | Builder |
| 1967 | Edward Powers Snr. | Field player |
| 1967 | Leonard "Len" Smith | Builder |
| 1967 | Harold "Haddie" Stoddart (1900–1974) | Field player |
| 1967 | Bill Whittaker | Box player |
| 1967 | Jack Wood (d.1997) | Field player |
| 1968 | Frank "Piper" Bain | Field player |
| 1968 | Clayton "Blackie" Black | Box player |
| 1968 | Brother Damien [Almer Cooney] | Builder |
| 1968 | Ivan "Turk" Davis | Builder |
| 1968 | Kelly DeGray | Field player |
| 1968 | Doug Fletcher | Builder |
| 1968 | Don Matheson (1920–1999) | Box player |
| 1968 | Angus "Angie" McDonald (1897–1998) | Field player |
| 1968 | Roy "Pung" Morton | Box player |
| 1968 | Oscar Swanson | Builder |
| 1969 | Gordon Gair (1916–2009) | Box player |
| 1969 | Ross Powless (1926–2003) | Box player |
| 1969 | Jim Bishop | Builder |
| 1969 | Edward Stephen "Ed" Blair | Builder |
| 1969 | George William Feeney (1895–1975) | Field player |
| 1969 | Arnold "Fergie" Ferguson | Box player |
| 1969 | Hugh Wilson Gifford (1892–1966) | Field player |
| 1969 | Leslie "Les" Gilmore | Builder |
| 1969 | Thomas F. "Tom" Gordon | Builder |
| 1969 | Gerald "Gerry" Kendall | Field player |
| 1970 | Roy "Fritzie" Cavallin (1919–2011) | Box player |
| 1970 | Albert Grenville "Dutch" Davis | Field player |
| 1970 | Mervin E. "Merv" Ferguson (ca.1909–2000) | Builder |
| 1970 | William K. "Bill" Fitzgerald | Box player |
| 1970 | Harry Godfrey (1880–1941) | Field player |
| 1970 | Carl Leonard Grauer | Builder |
| 1970 | Thomas Blain "Red" McDonald | Box player |
| 1970 | James Cameron "Jim" MacLeod | Builder |
| 1970 | Max "Porky" Peart | Builder |
| 1970 | Fred Robert "Whitey" Severson (1928–2020) | Box player |
| 1971 | Wilfred "Bucko" McDonald (1914–1991) | Box player |
| 1971 | Blythe O. Brown | Field player |
| 1971 | Archie Browning (1927–1989) | Box player |
| 1971 | William George "Bill" Calder | Builder |
| 1971 | Harry Carter | Box player |
| 1971 | Fred K. Conradi | Builder |
| 1971 | Robert Lester "Les" Dickinson | Builder |
| 1971 | Rex Stimers | Builder |
| 1971 | Thure Storme (1894–1975) | Field player |
| 1971 | Edward Douglas "Ed" Sullivan | Field player |
| 1971 | Walter George "Mush" Thompson | Box player |
| 1971 | Leonard "Len" Turnbull (1889–1952) | Field player |
| 1971 | John D. "Johnny" Vernon | Field player |
| 1971 | Harry R. Wipper | Box player |
| 1972 | Bradbury, Theodore "Ted" | Box player |
| 1972 | Chisholm, Colin James | Builder |
| 1972 | Felker, Neil | Field player |
| 1972 | Friend, George | Builder |
| 1972 | James Alexander "Jim" Gunn (1898-1987) | Field player |
| 1972 | Isaac "Ike" Hildebrand (1927–2006) | Box player |
| 1972 | Landon, Edwin Roland | Builder |
| 1972 | Mulliss, William Roy "Bill" | Box player |
| 1972 | Northup, Jack Edwin | Box player |
| 1972 | Perrett, Dr. T.S. "Doc" | Builder |
| 1973 | Anderson, Charles "Chick" | Builder |
| 1973 | Bryant, Bert | Box player |
| 1973 | Ewing, William "Buck" | Field player |
| 1973 | Fitzgerald, Jerry "Fitz" | Box player |
| 1973 | Gatecliff, Jack "Gate" | Builder |
| 1973 | Gimple, Gordon | Box player |
| 1973 | MacPhail, Don "Scotty" | Box player |
| 1973 | Miller, Douglas "Doug" | Builder |
| 1973 | Phillips, Reg "Pop" | Builder |
| 1973 | Sepka, Cliff | Box player |
| 1974 | Jack Bionda (1933–1999) | Box player |
| 1974 | Allan, Bob | Box player |
| 1974 | Ashbee, Don | Box player |
| 1974 | Blanchard, Bernard "Coco" | Builder |
| 1974 | Chisholm, Bill | Box player |
| 1974 | Delmonico, Henry Norman "Del" | Builder |
| 1974 | Gore, Roy | Field player |
| 1974 | Hope, Bill | Builder |
| 1974 | Pittendrigh, George | Builder |
| 1974 | Worthy, Jack | Field player |
| 1975 | Armstrong, E. Herbert "Herb" | Builder |
| 1975 | Bradford, Bernard "Bo" | Box player |
| 1975 | Jack Byford (d.1996) | Box player |
| 1975 | Campbell, Charles Donald "Donny" | Box player |
| 1975 | Connell, Charles | Field player |
| 1975 | John Douglas (ca.1912-2000) | Box player |
| 1975 | Moro, Lou | Builder |
| 1975 | Murphy, Walter Joseph "Jumping Joe" | Box player |
| 1975 | Roche, Val | Builder |
| 1975 | Waghorne Jr., Fred "Wag" | Builder |
| 1976 | Buchanan, Harry | Box player |
| 1976 | Daoust, Arthur "Art" | Builder |
| 1976 | Dixon, Ken | Box player |
| 1976 | Johnson, Alexander "Buck" | Field player |
| 1976 | Stan "Bunny" Joseph (1928–2001) | Box player |
| 1976 | Madgett, Carl | Builder |
| 1976 | Oliver, Robert "Bob" | Builder |
| 1976 | Wilson Douglass "Willis" Patchell (1893–1973) | Field player |
| 1976 | Jake Proctor (d.1997) | Box player |
| 1976 | Rowland, Douglas | Builder |
| 1976 | Scott, Tommy | Box player |
| 1976 | Fred 'Cliss' Starling | Field player |
| 1977 | Buckingham, Dick | Field player |
| 1977 | Davis, Jake "Mr. Zero" | Field player |
| 1977 | Dugan, Arnold "Arnie" | Box player |
| 1977 | Ella, Gordon | Field player |
| 1977 | Mike Gates (d.1999) | Box player |
| 1977 | Hammond, Gord "Pud" | Builder |
| 1977 | Holzberg, Norman | Box player |
| 1977 | Lubbock, Jack | Builder |
| 1977 | Meehan, Pete | Box player |
| 1977 | Shillington, Stan | Builder |
| 1977 | Smith, Arnold "Onions" | Box player |
| 1977 | Teather, Thomas "Tank" | Box player |
| 1978 | Kells, Morley | Builder |
| 1978 | Anthony, Pete | Box player |
| 1978 | Barclay, Jack (1934-2013) | Box player |
| 1978 | Davis, William "Bill" | Field player |
| 1978 | Gibson, Harold "Mooney" | Field player |
| 1978 | Harris, Bill | Box player |
| 1978 | Johnston, Geordie | Box player |
| 1978 | McKinnon, Jack | Builder |
| 1978 | Smart, Walter | Builder |
| 1978 | Urquhart, George | Box player |
| 1979 | Anderson, James D. "Jim" | Box player |
| 1979 | Bartlett, Dr. Wilbert W. "Bert" | Builder |
| 1979 | Coutie, Alexander Edmund "Al" | Field player |
| 1979 | Delmonico, Frederick Irwin "Herby" | Box player |
| 1979 | Evans, E. William "Bill" | Builder |
| 1979 | Gair, Jack | Box player |
| 1979 | Henderson, Wally | Builder |
| 1979 | Kowalyk, Norm | Builder |
| 1979 | Mulliss, Charles James "Jim" | Box player |
| 1979 | Usselman, Fred | Box player |
| 1980 | Baker, Pat | Box player |
| 1980 | Crema, Mario | Box player |
| 1980 | Jack Crosby (1941–2008) | Builder |
| 1980 | Masters, George "Sailor" | Box player |
| 1980 | Naylor, W.A. "Bert" | Builder |
| 1980 | Parnell, Paul | Box player |
| 1981 | Black, Peter James | Box player |
| 1981 | Fulton Sr., Jack | Builder |
| 1981 | Hatton, Frederick "Fred" | Box player |
| 1981 | Jones, Mel | Box player |
| 1981 | Lomore, Vincent James "Jim" | Builder |
| 1981 | McPherson, Alexander | Field player |
| 1982 | Cervi, John Raphael | Box player |
| 1982 | Ellison, William "Bill" | Builder |
| 1982 | Fulla, Fred Andrew | Box player |
| 1982 | Mason, John Elliot "Curly" | Box player |
| 1982 | Millar, Daniel William "Dan" | Builder |
| 1982 | Smith, Doug "Smitty" | Box player |
| 1983 | Joe Comeau (1940–1999) | Box player |
| 1983 | Douglas, Ralph | Builder |
| 1983 | Gillespie, Doug | Box player |
| 1983 | Gordon, Clyde | Field player |
| 1983 | Hamson, Wilfred "Wilf" | Box player |
| 1983 | Sinclair, Robert J. "Bob" | Builder |
| 1984 | Barron, Charles | Field player |
| 1984 | Budden, Douglas Ashby "Doug" | Builder |
| 1984 | Bullen, Glen | Field player |
| 1984 | Davis, John | Box player |
| 1984 | Dillon, Ranjit | Box player |
| 1984 | Dobbie, Robert "Bob" | Box player |
| 1984 | Fraser, Bill "Red" | Field player |
| 1984 | Frederickson, Gord | Box player |
| 1984 | Hawkins, Frank | Field player |
| 1984 | Mackie, Charles "Charlie" | Builder |
| 1985 | Armstrong, Bill | Builder |
| 1985 | Barbour, Bill | Box player |
| 1985 | Cy Coombes (1938-1999) | Box player |
| 1985 | Goudie, Hank | Field player |
| 1985 | Gregory, Leo | Field player |
| 1985 | Coridon Ashton "Cory" Hess (1880–1948) | Field player |
| 1985 | Kavanagh, "Big" Jim | Field player |
| 1985 | Lemon, Cy | Builder |
| 1985 | MacKay, Skip | Box player |
| 1985 | McNulty, Jim | Box player |
| 1986 | DeMars, William George "Bill" | Builder |
| 1986 | Ferri, Nick | Box player |
| 1986 | Goss, Wayne | Box player |
| 1986 | McNeill, Hector | Builder |
| 1986 | Thompson, Ivan | Box player |
| 1986 | Thorpe, Robert "Bob" | Box player |
| 1987 | Fred Wooster (1938–1993) | Builder |
| 1987 | Bradley, Bill | Box player |
| 1987 | Caruso, Enrico "Ricco" | Builder |
| 1987 | Howe, Ted | Box player |
| 1987 | Harry Kazarian (1925–1990) | Box player |
| 1987 | Salt, Bob | Box player |
| 1988 | Allen, John | Box player |
| 1988 | Babcock, Bob | Box player |
| 1988 | Baragar, Boyd | Builder |
| 1988 | Dorney, Jack | Box player |
| 1988 | McGregor, Jake | Builder |
| 1988 | Nelson, Robert William "Ham" | Box player |
| 1989 | Everett "Ev" Coates, Snr. (1919–2011) | Builder |
| 1989 | Cove, Doug | Box player |
| 1989 | Donaldson, Wally | Builder |
| 1989 | Ferguson, Larry | Box player |
| 1989 | Leslie D. "Les" Norman (1939–2010) | Box player |
| 1989 | Warick, Sid | Box player |
| 1990 | Gaylord Powless (1946–2001) | Box player |
| 1990 | Hamilton, Don | Box player |
| 1990 | Higgs, Jim | Box player |
| 1990 | McRory, Doug | Box player |
| 1990 | Meslo, Mickey | Builder |
| 1990 | Naish, James G.A. "Jim" | Builder |
| 1991 | Alexander, Kevin | Box player |
| 1991 | Crawford, Ken "Red" | Box player |
| 1991 | d'Amico, Tony | Box player |
| 1991 | Floyd, Ben | Builder |
| 1991 | Lewthwaite, Al | Box player |
| 1991 | Dorothy Robertson (d.1995) | Builder |
| 1992 | Davis, Terry | Box player |
| 1992 | Engemann, Joe & Rose | Builders |
| 1992 | MacNeil, Ron | Box player |
| 1992 | Marsh, Bob | Box player |
| 1992 | Reid, Bob | Builder |
| 1992 | Shuttleworth, Wayne | Box player |
| 1993 | d'Easum, Steve | Box player |
| 1993 | Mason, Mac | Builder |
| 1993 | Parsons, Kevin | Box player |
| 1993 | Harry Preston (1931–2004) | Builder |
| 1993 | Smeltzer, Larry | Box player |
| 1993 | Suggate, Paul | Box player |
| 1994 | Doug Hayes (1950–2020) | Box player |
| 1994 | Grant Heffernan | Box player |
| 1994 | Annie McDonald | Builder |
| 1994 | Lou Nickle | Box player |
| 1994 | Bill Rawson | Box player |
| 1994 | Mason Sheldrick (d.1999) | Builder |
| 1995 | Don Barrie | Builder |
| 1995 | Bill Coghill | Box player |
| 1995 | Jim Cox | Builder |
| 1995 | Dave Evans | Box player |
| 1995 | Dave "Porky" Russell | Box player |
| 1995 | Ken Winzoski | Box player |
| 1996 | Jim Aitchison | Box player |
| 1996 | Harry Benham | Builder |
| 1996 | Nirmal Dillon | Box player |
| 1996 | Ken Fetherston | Builder |
| 1996 | Glen "Shooter" Lotton | Box player |
| 1996 | Harry McKnight | Builder |
| 1996 | Brian Thompson | Box player |
| 1997 | Derry Davies | Box player |
| 1997 | Dave Durante | Box player |
| 1997 | Brian Evans | Box player |
| 1997 | Bob Hanna | Builder |
| 1997 | Bob "Buff" McCready | Box player |
| 1997 | Gary McIntosh | Builder |
| 1997 | Harry "Tonto" Smith (Jay Silverheels) (1912–1980) | Veteran player |
| 1997 | William "Whoopee" Arthurs | Veteran player |
| 1997 | Judy "Punch" Garlow | Veteran player |
| 1997 | George Gray | Veteran player |
| 1997 | R.G. "Bertie" Houston | Veteran player |
| 1997 | Harry Newman | Veteran player |
| 1997 | Douglas "Dougie" Ross | Veteran player |
| 1997 | George "Duke" Savage | Veteran player |
| 1997 | William "Stu" Scott | Veteran player |
| 1997 | Donn Sherry | Veteran player |
| 1998 | Fred Aspin | Builder |
| 1998 | Jim Brady | Builder |
| 1998 | Donald "Nip" O'Hearn | Box player |
| 1998 | Ron Pinder | Box player |
| 1998 | Russ Slater | Box player |
| 1998 | Earl Robert "Bob" Phelan (1918–1999) | Veteran player |
| 1998 | Arthur Pruden | Veteran player |
| 1998 | George Snowden | Veteran player |
| 1998 | William "Duke" Harrison | Veteran player |
| 1998 | Dave Tasker | Box player |
| 1998 | Caughnawaga 1876–1883 | Team |
| 1999 | Skip Chapman | Box player |
| 1999 | Bill "Whitey" Frick | Builder |
| 1999 | Jim "J.J." Johnston | Box player |
| 1999 | Ted "Ginger" Hall | Veteran player |
| 1999 | Alfie Wood | Veteran player |
| 1999 | Bob Parry | Builder |
| 1999 | Roger "Buck" Smith | Box player |
| 1999 | Brian Tasker | Box player |
| 1999 | Vancouver Carlings 1961–1967 | Team |
| 2000 | Alex Carey | Box player |
| 2000 | William "Casey" Cook | Builder |
| 2000 | Kerry Gallagher | Box player |
| 2000 | Robert "Bobby" Jamieson | Box player |
| 2000 | Brian "Butch" Keegan | Box player |
| 2000 | Walter "Scotty" Martin | Veteran player |
| 2000 | Irwin "Spud" Morelli | Veteran player |
| 2000 | Dean McLeod | Builder |
| 2000 | Oshawa Green Gaels (Junior) 1963–1969 | Team |
| 2001 | Mike French | Field player |
| 2001 | Rod Banister | Box player |
| 2001 | Oliver "Cap" Bomberry | Builder |
| 2001 | Bob Burke | Box player |
| 2001 | Eric "Eddie" Cowieson | Box player |
| 2001 | Jim McMahon | Box player |
| 2001 | Frank Madsen | Veteran player |
| 2001 | James Bradshaw | Veteran player |
| 2001 | John Van Os | Builder |
| 2001 | Team Canada - Men's Field 1978 | Team |
| 2002 | George Goodrich | Builder |
| 2002 | Ben Hieltjes | Box player |
| 2002 | Merv Schweitzer | Box player |
| 2002 | Tom Succamore | Builder |
| 2002 | Wayne Thompson | Box player |
| 2002 | Bruce Wanless | Box player |
| 2002 | Bill Jobb | Veteran player |
| 2002 | Pat Smith | Veteran player |
| 2002 | Peterborough Timbermen/Trailermen 1951–1956 | Team |
| 2003 | Stan Cockerton | Field player |
| 2003 | Ken Croft | Box player |
| 2003 | Geordie Dean | Box player |
| 2003 | Alf Brenner | Veteran player |
| 2003 | Lance Isaacs (d.1937) | Veteran player |
| 2003 | William Hutton | Builder |
| 2003 | Mike Reelie | Box player |
| 2003 | Gary Stevens | Box player |
| 2003 | Bob Wasson | Box player |
| 2003 | Jim Wasson | Box player |
| 2003 | Les Wingrove (1944-2018) | Builder |
| 2003 | Canada West (Coquitlam Adanacs) - Nations Cup 1980 | Team |
| 2004 | Tim Barrie | Box player |
| 2004 | Travis Cook | Box player |
| 2004 | Bob Tasker | Box player |
| 2004 | Bruce Turris | Box player |
| 2004 | Lew Landess (1927–2012) | Veteran player |
| 2004 | George "Scoop" Hayes | Veteran player |
| 2004 | Bill "Whiz" Wallace | Builder |
| 2004 | Herbert Martin | Builder |
| 2004 | Harry George Woolley (1942–2009) | Builder |
| 2004 | New Westminster Salmonbellies 1968–1972 | Team |
| 2005 | Sohen Gill (1941–2019) | Builder |
| 2005 | Ted Higgins | Builder |
| 2005 | Ivan Stewart | Box player |
| 2005 | James Meredith | Box player |
| 2005 | Elmer Tran | Box player |
| 2005 | Don Arthurs | Box player |
| 2005 | Ernie Smith | Veteran player |
| 2005 | Clinton "Mick" Magee | Veteran player |
| 2005 | St. Catharines Athletics 1938 | Team |
| 2006 | Rick Richards (1933–2020) | Builder |
| 2006 | Peter Vipond | Builder |
| 2006 | Charn Dhillon | Box player |
| 2006 | Wayne Colley | Box player |
| 2006 | Greg Thomas | Box player |
| 2006 | George Kapasky | Box player |
| 2006 | Mac Tyler (1943–2016) | Veteran player |
| 2006 | George Hector "Hec" Mackenzie | Veteran player |
| 2006 | Brooklin Redmen 1985–1991 | Team |
| 2007 | Lee "Leeroy" Vitarelli | Builder |
| 2007 | Jim "J.B." Burke | Builder |
| 2007 | Paul "Evy" Evans | Box player |
| 2007 | Ernie "Kaheranoron" Mitchell | Box player |
| 2007 | Mike Smith | Box player |
| 2007 | Art Webster | Box player |
| 2007 | Elmer "Milkshake" Lee | Veteran player |
| 2007 | Alex "Bucket" MacKay | Veteran player |
| 2007 | Kerri Hardill | Field player |
| 2007 | Team Canada - Men's Field 2006 | Team |
| 2008 | Bill McBain | Builder |
| 2008 | Robert Stuart "Ves" Vesey | Builder |
| 2008 | Todd Lorenz | Box player |
| 2008 | Larry Bell | Box player |
| 2008 | John Grant, Snr. | Box player |
| 2008 | Gary Moore | Box player |
| 2008 | Ross N. McDonald | Veteran player |
| 2008 | Alan "Al" Frick | Veteran player |
| 2008 | Gail Cummings-Danson | Field player |
| 2008 | Six Nations Chiefs 1994-1996 | Team |
| 2009 | Edwin George "Ted" Fridge (1940–2005) | Builder |
| 2009 | Jack Wilson | Builder |
| 2009 | Rick Brown | Box player |
| 2009 | Dan Perrault | Box player |
| 2009 | Ken Ruttan | Box player |
| 2009 | Darris Kilgour | Box player |
| 2009 | Ken Oddy | Veteran player |
| 2009 | John T. Hewitt | Veteran player |
| 2009 | Johnny "Gypsy" Mouradian | Field player |
| 2009 | Chris Sanderson (1974–2012) | Field player |
| 2009 | Burnaby Cablevision (Junior) 1977–1979 | Team |
| 2010 | Robert "Bob" Stewart (1935-2015) | Builder |
| 2010 | Terry Lloyd | Builder |
| 2010 | Tyson Leies | Box player |
| 2010 | Ken Thomas | Box player |
| 2010 | Barry "Paco" Maruk | Box player |
| 2010 | John Fusco | Box player |
| 2010 | Ken Webb | Veteran player |
| 2010 | John "Gus" McCauley | Veteran player |
| 2010 | Ted Sawicki | Field player |
| 2010 | Peterborough PCOs (Junior) 1972–1975 | Team |
| 2011 | Bill "Cass" Castator | Veteran player |
| 2011 | Dr. Donald Hedges | Builder |
| 2011 | John Herd | Builder |
| 2011 | David Huntley (1957–2017) | Field player |
| 2011 | Steve Mastine | Box player |
| 2011 | Kenneth Albert Matheson | Veteran player |
| 2011 | Chris Prat | Box player |
| 2011 | Victoria Royal Waxmen/SeaSprays 1980–1998 | Team |
| 2011 | Bram Wilfong | Box player |
| 2011 | Dan Wilson | Box player |
| 2012 | Brampton ABC Excelsiors (Junior) 1956–1959 | Team |
| 2012 | Canadian Olympic Gold Medal Team 1928 | Team |
| 2012 | R.G. "Bob" Curtis | Veteran player |
| 2012 | Mike Gray | Builder |
| 2012 | Ron Jay | Veteran player |
| 2012 | Derek "Jammer" Keenan | Box player |
| 2012 | Murray Lehman | Builder |
| 2012 | Tom Marechek | Box player |
| 2012 | Craig Stevenson | Box player |
| 2012 | Tom "Slick" Wreggit | Box player |
| 2013 | Bill Armour | Veteran player |
| 2013 | Ron Crosato | Officials |
| 2013 | Doug Deschner | Field player |
| 2013 | Dallas Eliuk | Box player |
| 2013 | Bill Gerrie | Box player |
| 2013 | Larry Henry | Veteran player |
| 2013 | Dwight Maetche | Box player |
| 2013 | Keith "Mac" McLennan | Field player |
| 2013 | Randy Mearns | Box player |
| 2013 | John "Joey" Todd | Veteran player |
| 2013 | Ron Winterbottom, Snr. | Builder |
| 2013 | New Westminster Salmonbellies 1958–1959 & 1962 | Team |
| 2014 | Gary Gait | Box player |
| 2014 | Paul Gait | Box player |
| 2014 | Gil Nieuwendyk | Box player |
| 2014 | Andy Ogilvie | Box player |
| 2014 | David General | Builder |
| 2014 | Harry Nightingale | Builder |
| 2014 | Reo Jerome (1924–2014) | Veteran player |
| 2014 | Ron Roy (1936–2007) | Veteran player |
| 2014 | BC Women's Selects Field Lacrosse 1983–1993 | Team |
| 2015 | Chris Gill | Box player |
| 2015 | Curt Malawsky | Box player |
| 2015 | Tom Patrick | Box player |
| 2015 | Jim Veltman | Box player |
| 2015 | Jeff Gombar | Field player |
| 2015 | Terry Sanderson (1952–2014) | Builder |
| 2015 | Lindsay Sanderson | Builder |
| 2015 | Chris Hall (1950–2014) | Builder |
| 2015 | Ed Goss | Veteran player |
| 2015 | Larry Lloyd | Veteran player |
| 2015 | Peterborough James Gang (Junior) 1981–1983 | Team |
| 2016 | Cam Devine | Player |
| 2016 | Russ Heard | Player |
| 2016 | Tom Phair, Jnr. | Player |
| 2016 | Don Stinson (1948–2007) | Player |
| 2016 | Dan Stroup | Player |
| 2016 | Ziggy Musial | Builder |
| 2016 | Ernie Truant | Builder |
| 2016 | Zenon Lipinski | Veteran player |
| 2016 | Jim McNeill | Veteran player |
| 2017 | Ken Colley | Player |
| 2017 | Pat Coyle | Player |
| 2017 | Clinton "Jan" Magee (1952–2017) | Player |
| 2017 | Jim Cain | Player |
| 2017 | Bob Clevely | Player |
| 2017 | Don Craggs (1933–2015) | Veteran player |
| 2017 | Peterborough Maulers (Junior) 1986–1987 & 1989 | Team |
| 2018 | Brian Hall | Player |
| 2018 | Jim Lynch | Player |
| 2018 | William Augustus "Bill" Squire | Player |
| 2018 | Jason Wulder | Player |
| 2018 | Ted Howe, Jnr. | Builder |
| 2018 | Dan Mattinson | Builder |
| 2018 | Jim Squires (1939–1971) | Veteran player |
| 2018 | Burnaby Lakers (Junior) 1996-2007 | Team |
| 2019 | Kevin Brunsch | Player |
| 2019 | Duane Jacobs | Player |
| 2019 | Dan Teat | Player |
| 2019 | John Wilson | Player |
| 2019 | George “Potsy” Burrows | Builder |
| 2019 | Paul Dal Monte | Builder |
| 2019 | Chuck Miller | Builder |
| 2019 | Dave Wilfong | Veteran player |
| 2019 | Whitby Warriors (Junior) 1984–1985 | Team |
| 2020 | Jamie Batley | Player |
| 2020 | Cam Bomberry | Player |
| 2020 | Michelle Bowyer | Player |
| 2020 | Ted Dowling | Player |
| 2020 | Paul Day | Builder |
| 2020 | Joey Harris | Builder |
| 2020 | Peter Berge | Veteran Player |
| 2020 | St. Catharines Athletics (Junior) 1990–1991 | Team |
| 2021 | Derek Malawsky | Player |
| 2021 | Eric Perroni | Player |
| 2021 | Lyle Robinson | Player |
| 2021 | Bob Watson | Player |
| 2021 | Pierre Filion | Builder |
| 2021 | Steve Govett | Builder |
| 2021 | Chuck Li | Veteran Player |
| 2021 | New Westminster Salmonbellies 1980–1989 | Team |
| 2022 | Rich Catton | Player |
| 2022 | Blane Harrison | Player |
| 2022 | Trish Nicholson | Player |
| 2022 | Josh Sanderson | Player |
| 2022 | Troyhann Santos | Player |
| 2022 | Kaleb Toth | Player |
| 2022 | Rey Comeault | Player |
| 2022 | Douglas Luey | Player |
| 2022 | Joanne Stanga | Player |
| 2022 | Bill Fox | Officials |
| 2023 | Len Powers | Veteran |
| 2023 | Scott Browning | Builder |
| 2023 | Paul Gilkinson | Builder |
| 2023 | Robert "Bob" Matte | Builder |
| 2023 | Jim Price | Officials |
| 2023 | Frank Lawrence | Officials |
| 2023 | Rick Lum | Officials |
| 2023 | Troy Cordingly | Player |
| 2023 | Jennifer "JJ" Johnson | Player |
| 2023 | Gavin Prout | Player |
| 2023 | Darren Reisig | Player |
| 2023 | Team Canada Women U19 (2015) | Team |
| 2024 | Barb Boyes | Builder |
| 2024 | Ed Comeau | Builder |
| 2024 | Dan Richardson | Builder |
| 2024 | Norm Isfjord | Officials |
| 2024 | Murray Taylor | Officials |
| 2024 | Pat O'Toole | Player |
| 2024 | Geoff Snider | Player |
| 2024 | John Swan | Player |
| 2024 | John Tavares | Player |
| 2024 | Victoria Shamrocks 1996–2006 | Team |
| 2024 | Barry Richardson | Veteran |
| 2025 | Mena Briscoe | Builder |
| 2025 | Jim Calder | Builder |
| 2025 | Tewenhni’Tatshon/Louis Delisle | Builder |
| 2025 | Frank Roundpoint | Builder |
| 2025 | Chet Couture | Officials |
| 2025 | Cheryl MacNeill | Officials |
| 2025 | Jim Richardson | Officials |
| 2025 | Cory Bomberry | Player |
| 2025 | Neil Doddridge | Player |
| 2025 | Scott Evans | Player |
| 2025 | Julie Norton | Player |
| 2025 | Phil Sanderson | Player |
| 2025 | Kylee (Reade) White | Player |
| 2025 | Pat Differ | Veteran |
| 2025 | Ted Greves | Veteran |
| 2025 | Orangeville Northmen Jr. A 1993 -1996 | Team |
| 2026 | Walt Christianson | Builder |
| 2026 | Bob McMahon | Builder |
| 2026 | Ray Durante | Officials |
| 2026 | Glenn Clark | Player |
| 2026 | John Grant Jr. | Player |
| 2026 | Grant Hamilton | Player |
| 2026 | Karoline Karpun | Player |
| 2026 | Bruce Murray | Player |
| 2026 | John Howard | Veteran |
| 2026 | Steve Manning | Veteran |
| 2026 | Jim Weller | Veteran |
| 2026 | Team Canada Women’s Sixes 2022 | Team |

== See also ==
- Canadian Lacrosse Hall of Fame - Honoured Member Page
- National Lacrosse Hall of Fame (US)
- Australian Lacrosse Hall of Fame
- National Lacrosse League Hall of Fame
- Tewaaraton Trophy
