= Alexander Nicholson =

Alexander Nicholson may refer to:

- Alexander Malcolm Nicholson (1900–1991), Canadian clergyman, farmer and politician
- Alexander John Nicholson (1895–1969), Irish-Australian entomologist
- Alexander M. Nicolson (1880/1881–1950), sometimes spelled Nicholson in later sources, American inventor
- Alexander Nicholson (police officer) (1863–1928), Australian police officer

== See also ==
- Alex Nicholson (disambiguation)
