= Derek Weiler =

Derek Xavier Weiler (October 4, 1968 – April 12, 2009) was a journalist and Canadian magazine editor. He was editor of Quill & Quire, Canada's national book trade magazine.

== Early career ==
Weiler received a B.A. and M.A. in English literature from the University of Waterloo and a certificate in Magazine and Book Publishing from Centennial College in Toronto.

His first job in publishing was as an editor for Key Porter Books.

== Quill & Quire ==
After being hired at Quill & Quire as a staff writer in 1999, he rose through the positions of review editor and news editor to be named editor in chief in 2004.

During his tenure, Weiler wrote book reviews and articles for the country's three major newspapers: The Globe and Mail, the Toronto Star and the National Post.

Weiler had a tattoo on his inner forearm that read "I can't go on. I'll go on," a well-known line from Samuel Beckett's The Unnamable, and a reference, as he revealed in a blog post, to his struggle with a heart condition, the details of which he did not reveal.

== Death ==
Weiler died suddenly, the result of his heart condition, on April 12, 2009, in Toronto at the age of 40, the day his last book review, of a debut story collection by Wells Tower, appeared in the Toronto Star.
