= Lyn Hamilton =

Canadian writer

Lyn Elizabeth Hamilton (August 6, 1944 – September 10, 2009) was a Canadian author of archaeological mystery novels.

Born to John Hamilton, a lawyer and politician, and Gwen, a librarian, Lyn Hamilton grew up in Etobicoke, Ontario, and was educated at the University of Toronto. She worked in communications in the public service and private companies before publishing her first novel at the age of 50. She had been director of Cultural Programs Branch for the province of Ontario and director of public affairs for the Canadian Opera Company. Later, Hamilton taught mystery writing for the School for Continuing Studies of the University of Toronto and served as writer-in-residence for libraries in North York and Kitchener.

== Death ==
She died on September 10, 2009, from cancer, aged 65.

== Bibliography ==
The Lara McClintoch Archaeological Mysteries

- The Xibalba Murders (1997)
- The Maltese Goddess (1998)
- The Moche Warrior (1999)
- The Celtic Riddle (2000)
- The African Quest (2001)
- The Etruscan Chimera (2002)
- The Thai Amulet (2003)
- The Magyar Venus (2004)
- The Moai Murders (2005)
- The Orkney Scroll (2006)
- The Chinese Alchemist (2007)

Other

- Death Dines In (anthology) (2004) - contributed Stark Terror at Tea-time
