= Alex Nicholson (Australian footballer) =

Australian rules footballer

Personal information
- Full name: Alexander Nicholson
- Born: 14 January 1897; Bright, Victoria
- Died: 29 June 1972 (aged 75); Parkville, Victoria
- Height: 178 cm (5 ft 10 in)
- Weight: 71 kg (157 lb)

Playing career^{1}
Years	Club	Games (Goals)
1921–1922	South Melbourne	11 (1)
- ^{1} Playing statistics correct to the end of 1922.

Alexander Nicholson (14 January 1897 – 29 June 1972) was an Australian rules footballer who played for the South Melbourne Football Club in the Victorian Football League (VFL).
