= Art Battle Canada =

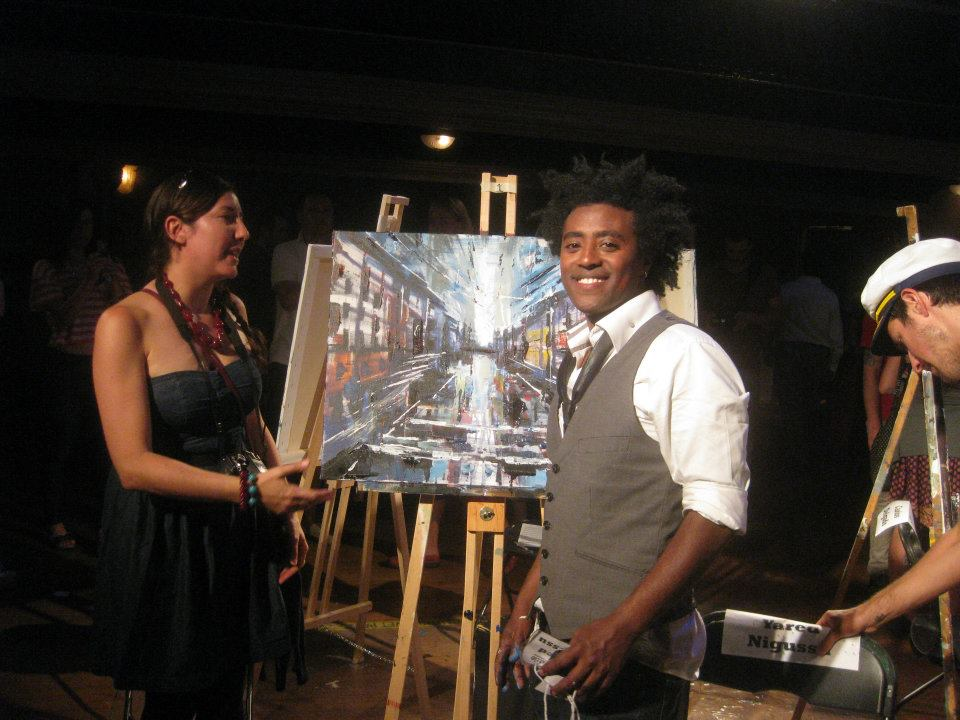
Yared Nigussu shows his winning painting after an Art Battle

Art Battles are live competitive painting events that take place in cities across Canada. Currently there are events in Vancouver, Toronto, Ottawa, Montreal, Kamloops, and Halifax.

Chris Pemberton and Simon Plashkes started Art Battle in Toronto in October 2009. Since then there has been an event at The Great Hall on Queen Street West every month.

Several artists are given 20 minutes to create a painting. Each audience member gets to vote on the painting they like the most by placing a ballot for that round (given at the door) in that artist's collection box. There are 2 or 3 preliminary rounds in which the most popular artists move on to the final round. The artist who gets the most ballots in the final round is declared the winner. All the paintings are then auctioned off to the audience members. Any painting that doesn't reach its minimum bid is destroyed with a chainsaw.
