= Stuart Robertson (gardener) =

Canadian gardener

Stuart Robertson (1944 – September 23, 2009) was a professional gardener from Montreal, Quebec, Canada. He was born in Bournemouth, England. Since 1981, he had been the gardening columnist for the Montreal Gazette and has been a part of the radio show Radio Noon on CBC Radio One. He has published a series of gardening guide books titled Stuart Robertson's Tips on Organic Gardening.

Robertson died from complications of pneumonia at St. Mary's Hospital on September 23, 2009.
