= Gordon Gair =

Canadian lacrosse player (1916–2009)

Gordon Gair Sr. (August 17, 1916 – April 23, 2009) was a Canadian lacrosse player and who has been inducted in the Canadian Lacrosse Hall of Fame.

== Biography ==
Born in the Toronto suburb of Mimico, he was one of four lacrosse playing brothers, three of whom are in the Canadian Lacrosse Hall of Fame. His brothers Norman and Jack are also in the Hall of Fame. His other brother, Lloyd, also played for many years. Gair was also first cousin to Ken Dixon and Archie Dixon, both of whom are also in the Hall of Fame. Gair is the father of Graeme Gair, who also had an outstanding career and is the grandfather of current star, Jackson Gair.

Gair still holds the OLA Major Series record for most goals in a game, with 14, scored on August 24, 1946, against the Orillia Terriers, part of his 100-goal season. Gair led the OLA senior A series in points in both 1936 and 1946. Gair's career total of 810 career goals puts him still tenth all-time in career goals, even though his career ended in 1949. Gair died on April 23, 2009, in Powassan, Ontario, at age 92.
