= Jerry Yanover =

Canadian political consultant

Jerald "Jerry" Yanover
- Born: January 3, 1947; Erie, Pennsylvania, U.S.
- Died: July 26, 2009 (aged 62); Ottawa, Ontario, Canada
- Resting place: Belleville, Ontario, Canada
- Occupations: Political strategist, advisor
- Known for: Liberal political advisor

Jerald "Jerry" Yanover (January 3, 1947 – July 26, 2009) was a political advisor in Canada.

For several decades, Yanover was the leading advisor to the Liberal Party of Canada House Leader. He was considered to be one of Canada's foremost experts on parliamentary procedure. While not a public figure, he played a central role in Canadian politics for many years. Maclean's magazine once stated that "Yanover is to Liberalism what Yoda is to the Jedi Council."

Born in Erie, Pennsylvania, the son of Gordon and Katherine Yanover, Yanover grew up in Kingston, Ontario. He was one of three siblings (sisters Judy and Gail).

He first came to Parliament Hill as a tour guide at age eighteen. After obtaining a political science degree from Queen's University, he returned to Parliament Hill in 1969 as assistant to Liberal House Leader Donald Macdonald.

He continued to serve as an advisor to the House Leader. He planned to retire after the 2004 election, but chose to remain to help the minority government. One of his greatest successes was arranging the votes on the 2005 federal budget, and preventing the defeat of the government on numerous votes of non-confidence. As a result of Yanover's efforts, the Liberal government survived the turbulent spring of 2005.

Yanover died in his Ottawa apartment where he lived with his Norwich Terrier, Opie. He was 62. His funeral service was held at the Jewish Memorial Chapel in Ottawa on July 29, 2009, with interment in Belleville, Ontario.
