= Duplex (automobile) =

The Duplex was a Canadian automobile built by the United Iron Works Company, of Montreal in 1923. The engine was an unconventional 4-cylinder two-stroke engine with two pistons per cylinder, which the makers claimed gave excellent fuel economy.

The Duplex had a 110-inch (2.8 m) wheelbase, and the proposed tourer was priced at CA$1750. The prototype was displayed at the 1923 Montreal Show, but there was very little interest shown, and production never eventuated.
