= Lou Moro =

Italian-born Canadian athletic trainer

- Born: Luigi Moro; 26 April 1918; Savona, Italy
- Died: 1 October 2009 (aged 91); Canada

Luigi "Lou" Moro (26 April 1918 – 1 October 2009) was a Canadian soccer and box lacrosse athletic trainer. Moro served as the athletic trainer for the Canadian men's national soccer team in Olympic and World Cup qualifying from 1971 to 1992.

Luigi Moro was born in Savona, Italy on 26 April 1918; his family emigrated to British Columbia in 1929. He started his training career for the Canadian Navy's ice hockey and lacrosse teams during World War II. Moro became a trainer for the Vancouver Lacrosse Club in the 1950s and stayed for 15 years, including the Mann Cup championships in the early 1960s. He also worked with the Vancouver Burrards' Senior A team in the 1970s.

Moro was the trainer of the Canadian national soccer team during a 1960 tour of England, Scotland, and Russia. He rejoined the team for 1972 Olympic qualifying and continued with the World Cup qualifying campaigns for 1974 and 1978. He joined the Vancouver Whitecaps for three years in the North American Soccer Leagueera and continued with the 86ers through the 1990s.

Moro was inducted into the Canadian Lacrosse Hall of Fame in 1975 and the Canadian Soccer Hall of Fame in 2000.
