= Fleetwood-Knight =

The Fleetwood-Knight was a Canadian automobile built in Kingston, Ontario by the Davis Dry Dock Company in 1923.

The Davis Dry Dock Company had an excellent reputation for the quality of their yachts, launches and lifeboats, and company owner John Davis wanted to build a car to the same high standards. The prototype was going to be built as a tourer, but Davis's son Lloyd took over development of the car and made it into a sedan. The prototype was nearly finished when it was damaged in a fire. It was rebuilt as a roadster, with a body of finished aluminium.

The Fleetwood-Knight was powered by a 6-cylinder Knight sleeve valve engine, which gave excellent performance. The car was very well appointed, with gasoline and temperature gauges on the dashboard. Unfortunately for the Davises, the prototype cost between CDN$5,000 and CDN$6,000 to build, so it was not economically viable to put the car in production. The car was driven by members of the Davis family until sold, and was still in regular use in Renfrew, Ontario in the late 1960s.
