= Bill Hajt =

Canadian ice hockey player (born 1951)

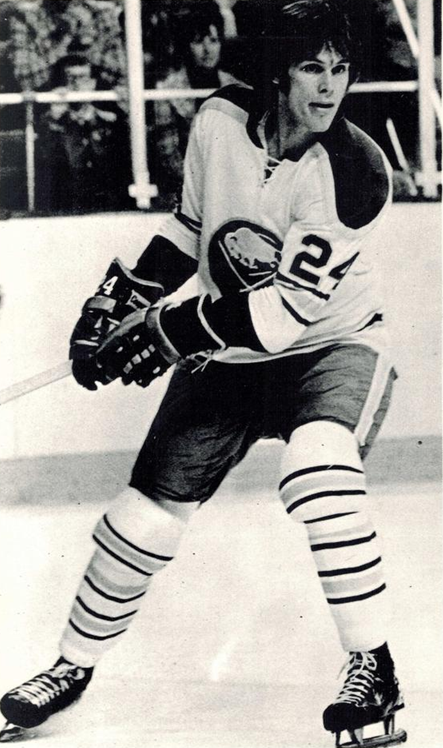
- Born: November 18, 1951 (age 74) Radisson, Saskatchewan, Canada
- Height: 6 ft 3 in (191 cm)
- Weight: 215 lb (98 kg; 15 st 5 lb)
- Position: Defence
- Shot: Left
- Played for: Buffalo Sabres
- NHL draft: 33rd overall, 1971; Buffalo Sabres
- Playing career: 1972–1987

William Albert Hajt (born November 18, 1951) is a Canadian former professional ice hockey defenceman who played in the NHL from 1973 until 1987. He featured in the 1975 Stanley Cup Finals with the Buffalo Sabres.

Hajt was drafted 33rd overall by the Buffalo Sabres in the 1971 NHL Amateur Draft. He played 854 career NHL games, all with the Sabres, scoring 42 goals and 202 assists for 244 points. His highest point total of his career was actually his rookie season, when he registered 29 points and a plus minus rating of +47.

Bill is the father of Ontario Reign assistant coach Chris Hajt who played six games in the National Hockey League for the Edmonton Oilers and the Washington Capitals.

== Career statistics ==
			Regular season					Playoffs
Season	Team	League	GP	G	A	Pts	PIM	GP	G	A	Pts	PIM
1967–68	Saskatoon Blades	WCHL	60	4	10	14	35	7	0	1	1	2
1968–69	Saskatoon Blades	WCHL	60	3	18	21	54	4	0	0	0	0
1969–70	Saskatoon Blades	WCHL	60	10	21	31	40	7	2	3	5	8
1970–71	Saskatoon Blades	WCHL	66	19	53	72	50	5	1	4	5	2
1972–73	Cincinnati Swords	AHL	69	4	31	35	40	15	2	9	11	14
1973–74	Buffalo Sabres	NHL	6	0	2	2	0	—	—	—	—	—
1973–74	Cincinnati Swords	AHL	66	5	30	35	66	5	0	4	4	4
1974–75	Buffalo Sabres	NHL	76	3	26	29	68	17	1	4	5	18
1975–76	Buffalo Sabres	NHL	80	6	21	27	48	9	0	1	1	15
1976–77	Buffalo Sabres	NHL	79	6	20	26	56	6	0	1	1	4
1977–78	Buffalo Sabres	NHL	76	4	18	22	30	8	0	0	0	2
1978–79	Buffalo Sabres	NHL	40	3	8	11	20	—	—	—	—	—
1979–80	Buffalo Sabres	NHL	75	4	12	16	24	14	0	5	5	4
1980–81	Buffalo Sabres	NHL	68	2	19	21	42	8	0	2	2	17
1981–82	Buffalo Sabres	NHL	65	2	9	11	44	2	0	0	0	0
1982–83	Buffalo Sabres	NHL	72	3	12	15	26	10	0	0	0	4
1983–84	Buffalo Sabres	NHL	79	3	24	27	32	3	0	0	0	0
1984–85	Buffalo Sabres	NHL	57	5	13	18	14	3	1	3	4	6
1985–86	Buffalo Sabres	NHL	58	1	16	17	25	—	—	—	—	—
1986–87	Buffalo Sabres	NHL	23	0	2	2	4	—	—	—	—	—
NHL totals			854	42	202	244	433	80	2	16	18	70

== See also ==
- Notable families in the NHL
