= Frank Morris (Canadian football) =

Canadian football player

No. 52
- Positions: Guard, Defensive tackle

Personal information
- Born: May 20, 1923; Toronto, Ontario, Canada
- Died: April 10, 2009 (aged 85); Edmonton, Alberta, Canada
- Listed height: 5 ft 11 in (1.80 m)
- Listed weight: 245 lb (111 kg)

Career history
- 1945–1949: Toronto Argonauts
- 1950–1958: Edmonton Eskimos

Awards and highlights
- 6× Grey Cup champion (1945, 46, 47, 54, 55, 56); Edmonton Eskimos Wall of Honour (1984)
- Canadian Football Hall of Fame (Class of 1983)

Frank Morris (May 20, 1923 – April 10, 2009) was a professional Canadian football offensive lineman and defensive lineman who played 14 seasons in the Canadian professional leagues for the Toronto Argonauts and the Edmonton Eskimos. He was a part of six Grey Cup championship teams (three with the Argonauts and three with the Eskimos) as a player and seven Grey Cup teams as a member of management and player personnel. He was inducted into the Canadian Football Hall of Fame in 1983.

Morris died on April 10, 2009, in Edmonton following a lengthy illness.
