= Alex Nicholson (ice hockey) =

Canadian ice hockey player

- Born: Alexander Nicholson; May 17, 1923 Winnipeg, Manitoba, Canada
- Died: June 19, 2009 (aged 86) Winnipeg, Manitoba, Canada
- Position: Goaltender
- Caught: Right
- Played for: Toledo Mercurys; New York Rangers
- Playing career: 1948–1950

Alexander "Alex" Nicholson (May 17, 1923 – June 19, 2009) was a Canadian professional ice hockey goaltender.

== Career ==
Nicholson led the goaltending average for the Toledo Mercurys where he played from 1948 through 1950. He played in three National Hockey League exhibition games for the New York Rangers.

== Personal life ==
Nicholson died in Winnipeg, Manitoba, Canada, on June 19, 2009, at the age of 86.
