= Robert Uffen =

Canadian geophysicist

Robert James Uffen
- Born: September 21, 1923; Toronto, Ontario
- Died: July 18, 2009 (aged 85); Kingston, Ontario
- Occupation(s): research geophysicist, professor, and university administrator
- Awards: Order of Canada

Robert James Uffen, OC FRSC (September 21, 1923 – July 18, 2009) was a Canadian research geophysicist, professor, and university administrator. He was the first dean of The University of Western Ontario Faculty of Science.

== Early life ==
Born in Toronto, Ontario, Uffen served with the Royal Canadian Artillery during World War II. He received a B.A.Sc. degree in Engineering Physics in 1949 and a Master of Arts degree in Geophysics in 1950 from the University of Toronto. He received a Ph.D. in Physics in 1952 from the University of Western Ontario.

== Career ==
From 1961 to 1965, he was the Principal of the University College of Arts and Science, University of Western Ontario. From 1965 to 1966, he was the Dean, College of Science. From 1963 to 1966, he was a member of the National Research Council. From 1967 to 1969, he was Chairman of the Defence Research Board of Canada. From 1969 to 1971, he was the Chief Science Advisor to the Cabinet, Privy Council of Canada Office in Ottawa. From 1971 to 1980, he was Dean, Faculty of Applied Science, Queen's University. From 1975 to 1979, he was Vice-Chairman, Ontario Hydro.

He was a Commissioner of the Ontario Royal Commission on Asbestos from 1980 to 1984 and of the Ontario Commission on Truck Safety from 1981 to 1983. He was a member of the Club of Rome from 1969 to 1984.

In 1964, he was made a Fellow of the Royal Society of Canada. In 1983, he was made an Officer of the Order of Canada in recognition for being an "internationally distinguished research geophysicist, teacher and university administrator". He was awarded the Canadian Centennial Medal and the Queen Elizabeth II Golden Jubilee Medal.
