= 2005 in Canada =

- Decades: 1980s; 1990s; 2000s; 2010s; 2020s
- See also: History of Canada; Timeline of Canadian history; List of years in Canada

Events from the year 2005 in Canada. This year was recognized, by Veterans Affairs Canada, as the Year of the Veteran.

== Incumbents ==
=== Crown ===
- Monarch – Elizabeth II

=== Federal government ===
- Governor General – Adrienne Clarkson (until September 27) then Michaëlle Jean
- Prime Minister – Paul Martin
- Chief Justice – Beverley McLachlin (British Columbia)
- Parliament – 38th (until 29 November)

=== Provincial governments ===
==== Lieutenant governors ====
- Lieutenant Governor of Alberta – Lois Hole (until January 6) then Norman Kwong (from January 20)
- Lieutenant Governor of British Columbia – Iona Campagnolo
- Lieutenant Governor of Manitoba – John Harvard
- Lieutenant Governor of New Brunswick – Herménégilde Chiasson
- Lieutenant Governor of Newfoundland and Labrador – Edward Roberts
- Lieutenant Governor of Nova Scotia – Myra Freeman
- Lieutenant Governor of Ontario – James Bartleman
- Lieutenant Governor of Prince Edward Island – Léonce Bernard
- Lieutenant Governor of Quebec – Lise Thibault
- Lieutenant Governor of Saskatchewan – Lynda Haverstock

==== Premiers ====
- Premier of Alberta – Ralph Klein
- Premier of British Columbia – Gordon Campbell
- Premier of Manitoba – Gary Doer
- Premier of New Brunswick – Bernard Lord
- Premier of Newfoundland and Labrador – Danny Williams
- Premier of Nova Scotia – John Hamm
- Premier of Ontario – Dalton McGuinty
- Premier of Prince Edward Island – Pat Binns
- Premier of Quebec – Jean Charest
- Premier of Saskatchewan – Lorne Calvert

=== Territorial governments ===
==== Commissioners ====
- Commissioner of Yukon – Jack Cable (until December 1) then Geraldine Van Bibber
- Commissioner of Northwest Territories – Glenna Hansen (until April 29) then Tony Whitford
- Commissioner of Nunavut – Peter Irniq (until April 21) then Ann Meekitjuk Hanson

==== Premiers ====
- Premier of the Northwest Territories – Joe Handley
- Premier of Nunavut – Paul Okalik
- Premier of Yukon – Dennis Fentie

== Events ==
=== January ===
- January 7 – Minister of Health Ujjal Dosanjh arrives in Sri Lanka to survey the aftermath of the 2004 Indian Ocean tsunami damage.
- January 8 – Disaster Assistance Response Team arrives in Sri Lanka to provide fresh water, tents, food and medical assistance to victims of the 2004 tsunami disaster.
- January 10 – The Canadian government increases its monetary contribution in the Humanitarian response to the 2004 Indian Ocean earthquake and tsunami to $425 million.
- January 14 – Minister of Citizenship and Immigration Judy Sgro resigns from her cabinet post as she is being investigated for illegal immigration practices.
- January 16 – Canadian Prime Minister Paul Martin begins a nine-day trip to Asia in Indonesia surveying the aftermath of the 2004 Indian Ocean tsunami damage. Martin also travelled to Sri Lanka, India, Japan and China.
- January 20 – Norman Kwong is appointed the new Lieutenant Governor of Alberta, following the death in office of Lois Hole.

=== February ===
- February – Canada introduces the Civil Marriage Act, making Canada the fourth country to sanction same-sex marriage.
- February 1 – Ontario Progressive Conservative Party member Ernie Eves resigns from the Ontario legislature.
- February 2 – Harjit Singh is deported to India.
- February 6 – A group of Ontarians file a class action lawsuit against Agropur Cooperative after they became sick from chocolate milk tainted by a cleaning chemical.
- February 8 – Controversial Toronto police chief Julian Fantino is appointed Ontario's new commissioner of emergency management.
- February 8 – Edmonton police chief Fred Rayner is fired after news of a police sting targeting a journalist and the chair of the city's police board comes to light.
- February 10 – Wal-Mart says it will close one of its stores in Jonquière, Quebec, just as its 200 workers are about to win the first-ever union contract from the world's largest retailer.
- February 14 – The Canadian government signs a multibillion-dollar deal with Newfoundland and Labrador and Nova Scotia for offshore natural resource revenues.
- February 18 – Quebec Premier Jean Charest shuffles his cabinet to improve his party's popularity.
- February 22 – Canada rejects a proposed missile defence plan with the United States.
- February 23 – The 2005 Canadian budget is presented.
- February 25 – The Anglican Church of Canada is asked to voluntarily withdraw for the time being from the Anglican Consultative Council on account of the blessing of same-sex unions at six parishes in the Anglican Diocese of New Westminster.

=== March ===
- March 1 – Frank McKenna becomes the new Canadian Ambassador to the United States.
- March 3 – Four Royal Canadian Mounted Police officers – Peter Schiemann, Lionide Johnston, Anthony Gordon and Brock Myrol – are killed by local James Roszko in a drug raid on his farm in Mayerthorpe, Alberta.
- March 8 – Grant DePatie, a gas station worker in Maple Ridge, British Columbia, is dragged to death for seven kilometers under a moving van after chasing after a 16-year-old who had stolen $12 worth of gas. Later, a new law called "Grant's Law", requires citizens in British Columbia to pay before they pump, becoming the first province in Canada to enforce this law.
- March 11 – 2004 Canadian sponsorship scandal: The Canadian government launches a $39 million lawsuit against Lafleur Communication Marketing, GroupAction, Groupe Everest and Le Groupe Polygone.
- March 11 – Without warning, Jetsgo immediately ceases all operations.
- March 16 – Ripudaman Singh Malik and Ajaib Singh Bagri are found not guilty by the Supreme Court of British Columbia at the Air India Trial.
- March 23 – The Security and Prosperity Partnership of North America (SPP) was launched by Paul Martin, Prime Minister of Canada, Vicente Fox, President of Mexico, and George W. Bush, President of the United States in Waco, Texas with a view to deepening the North American Free Trade Agreement following the September 11, 2001 attacks in the U.S.
- March 24 – Paul Martin arranges the appointment of Roméo Dallaire, Art Eggleton, Lillian Dyck, Jim Cowan, Elaine McCoy, Grant Mitchell, Robert Peterson, Nancy Ruth and Claudette Tardif to the Senate of Canada.

=== April ===
- April 1 – Thompson Rivers University is born from the merger of University College of the Cariboo and British Columbia Open University.
- April 12 – Kelly Ellard is found guilty of second degree murder in the 1997 murder of Reena Virk.
- April 13 – Neo-Nazi leader Wolfgang Droege, leader of the Heritage Front, is found shot dead in his apartment.
- April 21 – Prime Minister Paul Martin and the leaders of the opposition address the nation separately on television on the subject of the sponsorship scandal and the possibility of a general election being called this spring.
- April 26 – The Liberal Party of Canada and the New Democratic Party announce that they have come to an agreement in principle on the 2005 Canadian budget. This agreement is a move by the Liberals to avoid a vote of no confidence in the House of Commons, which would cause a general election to be called.
- April 29 – Sean Eagan dies from a heart condition while climbing Mount Everest.

=== May ===
- May – The Council on Foreign Relations releases the Report of an Independent Task Force on North America entitled Building A North American Community which elaborates on the Security and Prosperity Partnership of North America agreed in Waco, Texas on March 23, 2005, by Canadian Prime Minister Paul Martin, U.S. President George W. Bush and Mexican President Vicente Fox to produce a North American Union merging [Canada, the U.S. and Mexico. The Report airs the same month that the "First North-American Model Parliament" is launched in the Senate of Canada by the North American Forum on Integration (NAFI) based in Montreal.
- May 1 – Canada imposes a 15% surtax sanction on U.S. imports of cigarettes, oysters and live swine, after the Byrd Amendment was found to be illegal by the World Trade Organization.
- May 5 – A Canadian Forces Maritime Command board of inquiry finds no one accountable for the fatal fire aboard HMCS Chicoutimi.
- May 10 – The House passes a motion, which the opposition says should topple the government. The governing Liberals refuse to resign following this by claiming that this is a procedural matter and not a vote of no confidence.
- May 13 – Jetsgo declares bankruptcy.
- May 17 – Belinda Stronach who ran for the leadership of the Conservative Party crosses the floor to the Liberal Party and becomes Minister of Human Resources and Skills Development.
- May 17 – Queen Elizabeth II arrives in Canada for a nine-day visit to celebrate the centennial of Alberta and Saskatchewan.
- May 17 – British Columbia general election and electoral reform referendum.
- May 19 – In the House of Commons, Paul Martin's minority government survives two confidence votes. For the first time in Canadian history, the Speaker of the House votes to break a tie in a confidence vote, which the government wins 153 to 152.
- May 20 – Six oil workers die and another two dozen are injured in Alberta when their bus is T-boned by a tractor-trailer.
- May 23 – The four Canadian soldiers killed in the Tarnak Farm incident by United States Air Force fighter pilot Major Harry Schmidt on April 18, 2002, are posthumously remembered at a ceremony in Fort Campbell, Kentucky, along with three Americans, whose names were added to a memorial wall.
- May 24 – Todd Russell of the Liberal Party wins a federal by-election held in Labrador to replace the late Lawrence D. O'Brien.
- May 26 – the National Assembly of Quebec passes a motion to prevent the use of Islamic courts in Quebec.
- May 27–30 – Triumvirate, the "First North-American Model Parliament", being a simulation of a North American parliament, is launched in the Canadian Senate in Ottawa by the North American Forum on Integration (NAFI), at the invitation of Liberal Senator Céline Hervieux-Payette.
- May 31 – Miss Universe Canada Natalie Glebova became Miss Universe in Bangkok.

=== June ===
- June 6 – Pat O'Brien quits the Liberal Party to sit as an independent in the House of Commons.
- June 6 – Conservative MP Gurmant Grewal takes a "stress leave" from Parliament, after Air Canada reveals that he's under a security investigation.
- June 7 – Émile Nelligan Bust installed.
- June 9 – The Supreme Court of Canada rules against the Quebec Health Insurance Act and Quebec Hospital Insurance Act sections that prohibit buying private health insurance for medically necessary medical services.
- June 11–12 – A heat wave hits central Canada, producing temperatures of about 31 °C with a humidex of 41.
- June 16 – Canada's first three satellite radio services are licensed by the Canadian Radio-television and Telecommunications Commission. One is licensed to XM Radio Canada, one to Sirius Canada, and one to a partnership between CHUM Limited and Astral Media.
- June 23 – Court of Queen's Bench of New Brunswick Justice Judy L. Clendening ruled the prohibition of same-sex marriage was unconstitutional.
- June 28 – Canadian Forces restructures the military of Canada by creating Canada Command.
- June 28 – The Supreme Court of Canada restores a deportation order issued to Léon Mugesera.
- June 28 – Bill C-38 passes third reading in the House of Commons, virtually assuring same-sex marriage in Canada. The final vote count was 158–133 in favour, after a Conservative motion failed 158–127 to send it back to committee.

=== July ===
- July 2 – Live 8 takes place in Park Place, Barrie, Ontario.
- July 4 – Karla Homolka is released from prison.
- July 8 – Adrienne Clarkson undergoes pacemaker surgery. Beverly McLachlin, as Chief Justice of Canada, becomes administrator of the government during Clarkson's convalescence.
- July 13 – Dodge White, an American man, is arrested in Victoria, British Columbia by Canada Border Services Agency for possession of an explosive device.
- July 13 – Bernard Ebbers, an Edmonton–born American businessman, is sentenced by U.S. Federal Judge Barbara Jones to 25 years in prison for corporate fraud.
- July 14 – A United States appellate court rules that beef imports from Canada do not hurt the food supply despite mad cow disease concerns, effectively re-opening the border.
- July 20 – Same-sex marriage in Canada becomes legal when Chief Justice Beverley McLachlin (acting as the governor general's deputy or administrator of the government) gives royal assent to the Civil Marriage Act.

=== August ===
- August 2 – Air France Flight 358 bursts into flames after overrunning the runway while landing at Toronto Pearson International Airport with no casualties.
- August 2 – The governor general appoints five new senators: Andrée Champagne and Dennis Dawson of Quebec, Hugh Segal of Ontario, Larry W. Campbell of British Columbia, and Rod Zimmer of Manitoba.
- August 3 – Martin announces that Canadian Broadcasting Corporation journalist Michaëlle Jean will be appointed the next Governor General.
- August 4 – The Supreme Court of Canada suspends for 12 months its recent ruling that the Quebec government cannot prevent people from paying for private insurance for health-care procedures covered under medicare.
- August 9 – Ernest "Smokey" Smith's remains lie in state at Parliament Hill's foyer with the Canadian flag draped across his coffin.
- August 13 – Ernest "Smoky" Smith receives a full military funeral.
- August 15 – The Canadian Broadcasting Corporation enters a labour dispute with its staff, significantly affecting programming on all of the CBC radio and television networks. Only staff in Quebec and Moncton, New Brunswick are unaffected, due to membership in a different union.
- August 18 – HMCS Fredericton (FFH 337) is deployed to the Canadian Arctic to prohibit illegal fishing and to reassert sovereignty in the North.
- August 19 – Former New Brunswick cabinet minister Vaughn Blaney leads team into CFB Gagetown to investigate claims of Agent Orange being used.
- August 19 – The Royal Canadian Mounted Police (RCMP) decides not to press criminal charges against former employees of Hollinger International.
- August 20 – Airport security workers security system debuts, after three years.
- August 21 – British Columbia mortgages alleged serial killer Robert Pickton's land for $10 million.

=== September ===
- September 1 – Saskatchewan and Alberta celebrate their centennials as provinces.
- September 2 – The Canadian government deploys an Airbus A321 to New Orleans, to transport Canadians] stranded in the area after Hurricane Katrina, to airlift them to Lackland Air Force Base in San Antonio, Texas. Four warships and a Canadian Coast Guard vessel with relief supplies were dispatched.
- September 5 – Global groups unite against Islamic arbitration in Ontario.
- September 9 – Halifax International Airport terminal named for Premier of Nova Scotia Robert Stanfield.
- September 19 – Sponsorship scandal: Paul Coffin is sentenced to two years less a day conditional sentence for his involvement.
- September 19 – Canadian warships head home from Hurricane Katrina relief mission.
- September 19 – Canada and Denmark agree to Hans Island process.
- September 25 – New Brunswick New Democratic Party elected Allison Brewer as leader.
- September 27 – Michaëlle Jean succeeds Adrienne Clarkson as Governor General.
- September 27 – 2005 Newfoundland and Labrador municipal elections occur.

=== October to December ===
- October 10 – Education strike begins in British Columbia closing down 40,000 schools, and turning down 600,000 students.
- October 11 – Eliteweb begins operations.
- October 24 – Education strike ends in British Columbia exactly two weeks after the beginning of the strike.
- October 26 – An evacuation of over 800 members of the Kashechewan First Nation by the Government of Ontario to Ottawa, Sudbury, and other communities in Ontario begins after E. coli is found in their water supply network.
- November 24 – Opposition leader Stephen Harper moves a motion of no confidence in the government of Paul Martin.
- November 28 – The House of Commons passes a motion of no confidence in the government of Paul Martin.
- November 28 – 190 nations gather for the Montreal Climate Change Conference 2005 until December 9.
- November 29 – The governor general, on the advice of the prime minister, dissolves Parliament and calls a general election for January 23, 2006.
- November 30 – A Montreal judge overturns the 14 conditions imposed on killer Karla Homolka.
- December 26 – Seven people are shot and one girl killed in a shooting by two men on Yonge St., Toronto

=== Date not known ===
- Laserglow Technologies company is founded in Toronto.

== Arts and literature ==
- February 25 – Frank Parker Day's novel Rockbound is named the winner of Canada Reads 2005
- March 26 – Ian and Sylvia's "Four Strong Winds" is named the greatest Canadian song of all time on CBC Radio One's 50 Tracks
- June 2 – Roo Borson's Short Journey Upriver Toward Oishida is named winner of the Canadian Griffin Poetry Prize
- June 29 – The Rooms, a new cultural facility in St. John's, Newfoundland and Labrador housing the province's art gallery, provincial historical museum and provincial archives, is officially opened.
- September 12: Peter C. Newman's controversial book The Secret Mulroney Tapes: Unguarded Confessions of a Prime Minister is released.
- September 20 – Canadian rocker J.D. Fortune is named the winner of the television reality show Rock Star: INXS, becoming the new lead singer of popular Australian rock band INXS.

== Sport ==
- January 4 – The Canadian junior men's hockey team wins the IIHF World Junior Championship, defeating Russia 6–1. The team, which went undefeated over the course of the tournament, was touted as the "Greatest Team" to ever play in the junior men's tournament. They won Canada's first gold medal at the tournament since 1997.
- March 10 – Governor General Adrienne Clarkson announces that she will create a trophy for women's hockey in Canada. (The National Hockey League's Stanley Cup was donated in 1892 by a predecessor of Clarkson's, Lord Frederick Stanley.)
- May 8 – Steve Nash becomes the first Canadian player to win the NBA MVP Award
- May 29 – The London Knights win their first Memorial Cup by defeating Rimouski Océanic 4 to 0. The tournament was played at the John Labatt Centre in London, Ontario
- June 15 – Wayne Gretzky is appointed executive director of Team Canada for the 2006 Winter Olympics in Turin, Italy.
- October 5 – After a lockout, which wiped out the entire 2004-05 NHL Season, NHL hockey returns to play.
- November 17 – Paul Boehm wins silver in skeleton in the World Cup at Lake Placid, New York
- November 27 – The Edmonton Eskimos win their 13th Grey Cup by defeating the Montreal Alouettes 38 to 35 in the 93rd Grey Cup played at BC Place Stadium in Vancouver
- December 3 – Clara Hughes wins gold for the Women's 5000 metres at the Speed Skating World Cup
- December 3 – Cindy Klassen wins bronze for the Women's 5000 metres in speed skating at the World Cup.
- December 3 – Denny Morrison, Arne Dankers and Justin Warsylewicz win silver for the 3,200 metre Men's Team Pursuit in speed skating at the World Cup.
- December 3 – Marie-France Dubreuil and Patrice Lauzon win gold in figure skating at the NHK Trophy event.
- December 3 – The Wilfrid Laurier Golden Hawks win their second Vanier Cup by defeating the Saskatchewan Huskies 24 to 23 at the 41st Vanier Cup played at Ivor Wynne Stadium, Hamilton, Ontario

== Births ==
- July 17 – Connor Bedard, Junior ice hockey player and first ever WHL exceptional status player

== Deaths ==
=== January to March ===
- January 6
  - Lois Hole, politician, businesswoman, educator, author and Lieutenant Governor of Alberta
  - Louis Robichaud, lawyer, politician and 25th Premier of New Brunswick (born 1925)
- January 13 – Earl Cameron, broadcaster and news anchor (born 1915)
- January 14 – Charlotte MacLeod, writer (born 1922)
- January 15 – Dan Lee, animator (born 1969)
- January 22 – Harry J. Boyle, broadcaster and writer (born 1915)
- January 26 – Fraser Elliott, lawyer, supporter of the arts and philanthropist (born 1921)
- January 27 – Jonathan Welsh, actor (born 1947)
- January 30 – Martyn Bennett, musician (born 1971)
- January 31 – Ron Basford, politician and Minister (born 1932)
- February 1 – John Vernon, actor (born 1932)
- February 5 – Bob McAdorey, television and radio broadcaster (born 1935)
- February 21 – Gérard Bessette, author and educator (born 1920)
- March 12 – Bill Cameron, news anchor, television producer, columnist and author (born 1943)
- March 26 – Gérard Filion, businessman and journalist (born 1909)
- March 27 – Wilfred Gordon Bigelow, heart surgeon (born 1913)
- March 28 – Robin Spry, filmmaker and television producer (born 1939)

=== April to June ===
- April 1 – Alexander Brott, violinist, composer, and conductor (b. 1915)
- April 3 – Frank Clair, Canadian Football League coach (born 1917)
- April 22 – Stephane Provost, National Hockey League linesman (born 1967)
- April 27
  - Red Horner, ice hockey player (born 1909)
  - Christina McCall, political writer (born 1935)
- May 2 – Robert Hunter, environmentalist, journalist, author and politician (born 1941)
- May 11 – Léo Cadieux, politician, Minister and diplomat (born 1908)
- May 15
  - Alan B. Gold, Canadian lawyer and jurist (born 1917)
  - Ernie Jones, Canadian politician (born 1910)
- May 19 – Henry Corden, Canadian-born American actor, voice actor and singer (born 1920)
- May 22 – Terry Carisse, singer, guitarist, and songwriter (born 1942)
- May 25 – Domenic Troiano, rock guitarist (born 1946)
- June 3 – Harold Cardinal, writer, political leader, teacher, negotiator and lawyer (born 1945)
- June 14 – Norman Levine, short-story writer, novelist and poet (born 1923)
- June 17 – Ben Kerr, street performer, author, broadcaster, musician and perennial candidate (born 1930)

=== July to September ===
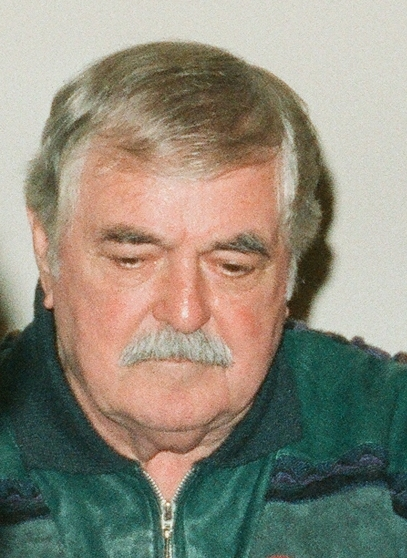
James Doohan, 1997

- July 9
  - Chuck Cadman, politician (born 1948)
  - Alex Shibicky, ice hockey player (born 1914)
- July 10 – Frank Moores, businessman, politician and 2nd Premier of Newfoundland (born 1933)
- July 18 – Bill Hicke, ice hockey player, coach, and manager (born 1938)
- July 20 – James Doohan, actor (born 1920)
- July 21 – Long John Baldry, singer and voice actor (born 1941)
- July 23 – Edith Firth, historian and librarian (born 1927)
- August 3 – Ernest Smith, soldier and Victoria Cross recipient (born 1914)
- August 7 – Peter Jennings, journalist and television news anchor (born 1938)
- August 9 – Kay Tremblay, actress (born 1914)
- August 17 – Dottie Hunter, baseball player (born 1916)
- August 18 – Gérard Filion, businessman and journalist (born 1909)
- August 21 – James Jerome, jurist, politician and Speaker of the House of Commons of Canada (born 1933)

=== October to December ===
- October 8 – George Hislop, gay activist (born 1927)
- October 20 – Alexis Mazurin, comedian and radio personality (born 1978)
- October 29 – Lloyd Bochner, actor (born 1924)
- October 30 – David Bazay, television journalist (born 1939)
- November 16 – John Marlyn, writer (born 1912)
- December 3 – Allan Waters, businessman and media mogul (born 1921)
- December 26 – Jane Creba, murder victim (born 1990)
- December 27 – C. William Doody, politician and Senator (born 1931)
- December 31 – Aiko Suzuki, textile and visual artist (d. 1937).

== See also ==
- 2005 in Canadian television
- List of Canadian films of 2005
