= 1969 in Canada =

- Decades: 1940s; 1950s; 1960s; 1970s; 1980s
- See also: History of Canada; Timeline of Canadian history; List of years in Canada

Events from the year 1969 in Canada.

== Incumbents ==
=== Crown ===
- Monarch – Elizabeth II

=== Federal government ===
- Governor General – Roland Michener
- Prime Minister – Pierre Trudeau
- Chief Justice – John Robert Cartwright (Ontario)
- Parliament – 28th

=== Provincial governments ===
==== Lieutenant governors ====
- Lieutenant Governor of Alberta – Grant MacEwan
- Lieutenant Governor of British Columbia – John Robert Nicholson
- Lieutenant Governor of Manitoba – Richard Spink Bowles
- Lieutenant Governor of New Brunswick – Wallace Samuel Bird
- Lieutenant Governor of Newfoundland – Fabian O'Dea (until April 2) then Ewart John Arlington Harnum
- Lieutenant Governor of Nova Scotia – Victor de Bedia Oland
- Lieutenant Governor of Ontario – William Ross Macdonald
- Lieutenant Governor of Prince Edward Island – Willibald Joseph MacDonald (until October 6) then John George MacKay
- Lieutenant Governor of Quebec – Hugues Lapointe
- Lieutenant Governor of Saskatchewan – Robert Hanbidge

==== Premiers ====
- Premier of Alberta – Harry Strom
- Premier of British Columbia – W.A.C. Bennett
- Premier of Manitoba – Walter Weir (until July 15) then Edward Schreyer
- Premier of New Brunswick – Louis Robichaud
- Premier of Newfoundland – Joey Smallwood
- Premier of Nova Scotia – G.I. Smith
- Premier of Ontario – John Robarts
- Premier of Prince Edward Island – Alexander B. Campbell
- Premier of Quebec – Jean-Jacques Bertrand
- Premier of Saskatchewan – Ross Thatcher

=== Territorial governments ===
==== Commissioners ====
- Commissioner of Yukon – James Smith
- Commissioner of Northwest Territories – Stuart Milton Hodgson

== Events ==
The National Arts Centre opened in Ottawa on June 2

- January 29 – February 11 – The Sir George Williams Computer Riot occurs as students occupy the computer centre of Sir George Williams University to protest alleged racism on campus
- February 13 – FLQ terrorists bomb the Montreal Stock Exchange
- February 19 – An 18-month-long strike by Quebec teachers comes to an end
- March 7 – Pierre-Paul Geoffroy pleads guilty to charges connected to 31 FLQ bombings
- April 18 – New Brunswick adopts an Official Languages Act mandating that government services be available in both English and French
- May 2 – Telesat Canada is formed
- May 4 – In a repeat of the previous season's hockey finals, the Montreal Canadiens defeat the St. Louis Blues four games to none to win the Stanley Cup.
- June 2 – The National Arts Centre in Ottawa opens
- June 27 – Parliament decriminalizes consensual homosexual sex, with some exceptions
- July 7 – The Official Languages Act makes French and English equal throughout the Canadian government
- July 15 – Edward Schreyer becomes premier of Manitoba, replacing Walter Weir
- August 24 – The oil tanker Manhattan becomes the first such ship to travel through the Northwest Passage
- September 27- The Ontario Science Centre in Toronto opens
- October 23 – at 8:21 am HMCS Kootenay (DDE 258) suffers the worst peacetime accident in the history of the navy during routine full-power trials when her starboard gearbox reaches an estimated temperature of 650 degrees Celsius and explodes. The explosion and the ensuing fire killed 9 crew members and injured at least 53 others.

== Arts and literature ==
=== New works ===
- Margaret Atwood - The Edible Woman
- Timothy Findley - The Butterfly Plague
- Robert Kroetsch - The Studhorse Man
- Mordecai Richler - The Street
- Milton Acorn - I've Tasted My Blood
- Farley Mowat - The Boat Who Wouldn't Float
- Gilles Archambault - Le tendre matin
- Marshall McLuhan - Counterblast

=== Awards ===
- See 1969 Governor General's Awards for a complete list of winners and finalists for those awards.
- Stephen Leacock Award: Stuart Trueman, You're Only as Old as You Act
- Vicky Metcalf Award: Audrey McKim

=== Music ===
- Karel Ančerl replaces Seiji Ozawa as music director of the Toronto Symphony Orchestra

== Sports ==
- March 9 – The Toronto Varsity Blues win their third University Cup by defeating the Sir George Williams Georgians 4 to 2. The final game was played at Edmonton Gardens.
- April 8 – The Montreal Expos win their first game by defeating the New York Mets 11–10 at Shea Stadium in Queens.
- April 14 – The Montreal Expos win their first home game by defeating the St.Louis Cardinals 8 to 7 at Jarry Park Stadium in Montreal.
- May 4 – The Montreal Canadiens win their 16th Stanley Cup by defeating the St. Louis Blues 4 games to 0. Landrienne, Quebec's Serge Savard is awarded the Conn Smythe Trophy.
- May 5 – The Ontario Hockey Association's Montreal Jr. Canadiens win their third Memorial Cup by defeating the Saskatchewan Junior Hockey League's Regina Pats 4 games to 0. The deciding game 4 was played at Regina Exhibition Stadium.
- November 21 – The Manitoba Bisons win their first Vanier Cup by defeating the McGill Redmen by a score of 24–15 in the 5th Vanier Cup played at Varsity Stadium in Toronto.
- November 30 – The Ottawa Rough Riders won their seventh Grey Cup by defeating the Saskatchewan Roughriders 29 to 11 in the 57th Grey Cup at Montreal's Autostade. Hamilton, Ontario's Russ Jackson became the first Canadian to be the game's official MVP.

== Births ==
=== January to March ===
- January 2 - Patrick Huard, actor
- January 3 - Tom Petryshen, wrestler
- January 11 - Andrew Griffiths, field hockey player
- January 23 - Brendan Shanahan, ice hockey player
- January 24 - Mike Spencer Bown, world traveler and author
- January 27 - Michael Kulas, singer-songwriter and producer (James)
- January 31 - Dov Charney, entrepreneur and clothing manufacturer
- February 4
  - Duncan Coutts, bass player and songwriter (Our Lady Peace)
  - Dallas Drake, ice hockey player and coach
- February 11 - Lee Tockar, voice actor
- February 16 - Claude Lambert, boxer
- February 22 - Kathy Tough, volleyball player

=== April to June ===
- April 3 - Lance Storm, wrestler
- April 7 - Gary Anderson, swimmer
- April 19 - Andrew Carnie, linguist, author, and academic
- May 6 - Raymond Brown, swimmer

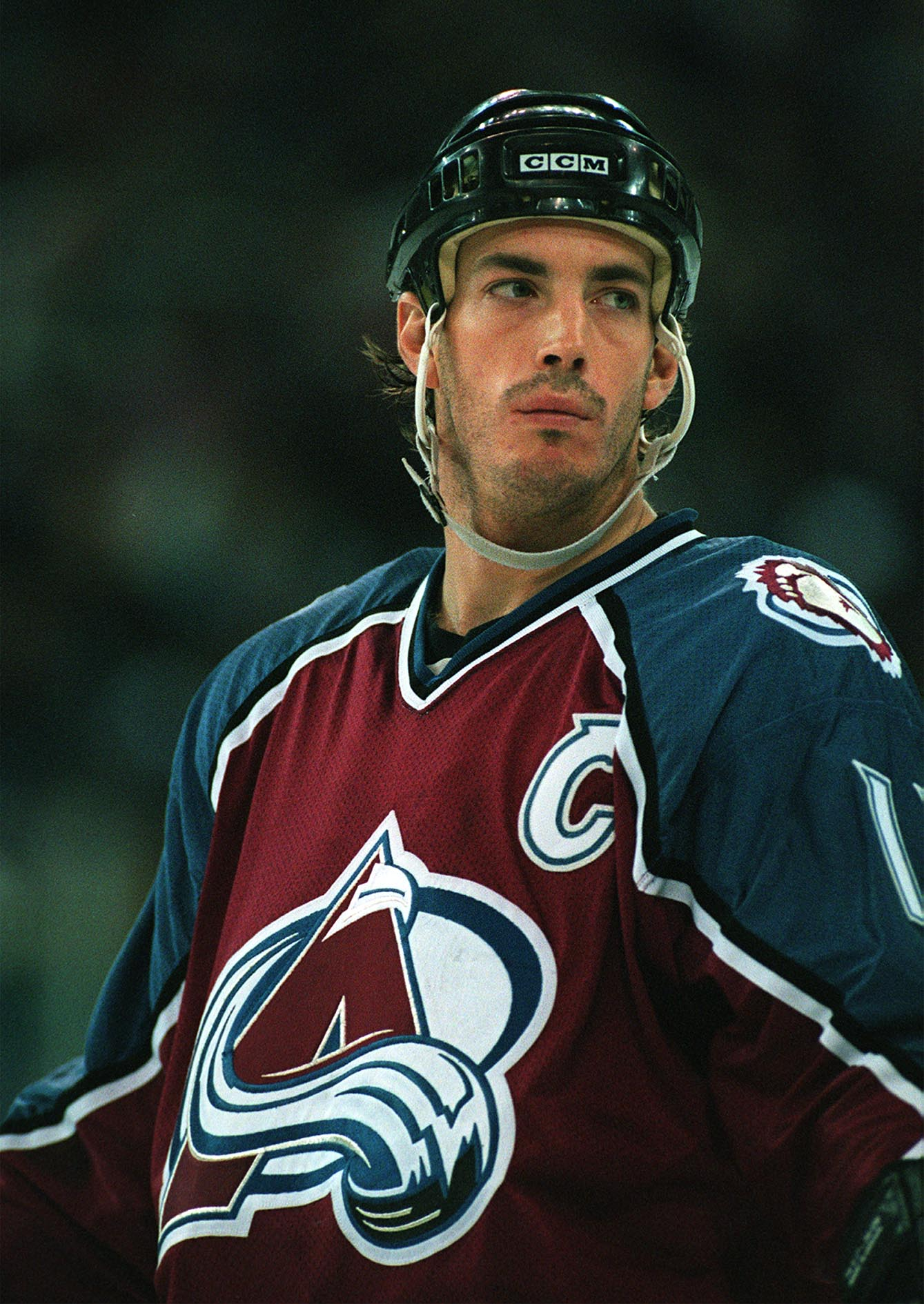
Joe Sakic

- May 15 - Mark Jackson, hurdler
- May 16 - Yannick Bisson, actor (Murdoch Mysteries)
- May 19
  - Dan Lee, animator (d. 2005)
  - Rochelle Low, field hockey player
- May 28 - Rob Ford, politician and 64th Mayor of Toronto
- June 11 - Bryan Fogarty, ice hockey player (d. 2002)
- June 12 - Kelvin Goertzen, politician

=== July to September ===
- July 7 - Joe Sakic, ice hockey player
- July 7 - Cree Summer, actress, musician and voice actress
- July 13 - Ewan Beaton, judoka
- July 16 - Turlough O'Hare, swimmer
- July 17 - Tom Glesby, boxer
- July 17 - Laurelee Kopeck, field hockey player
- July 23 - Andrew Cassels, ice hockey player
- July 24 - Rick Fox, basketball player and actor
- August 5 - Kati Dagenais, world champion musher, an athlete in sled-dog racing
- August 6 - Kristyn Dunnion, writer and performance artist
- August 15 - Mark Heese, beach volleyball player and Olympic bronze medallist
- August 19 - Matthew Perry, actor (d. 2023)
- August 23 - Hari Kant, field hockey player
- August 28 - Pierre Turgeon, ice hockey player

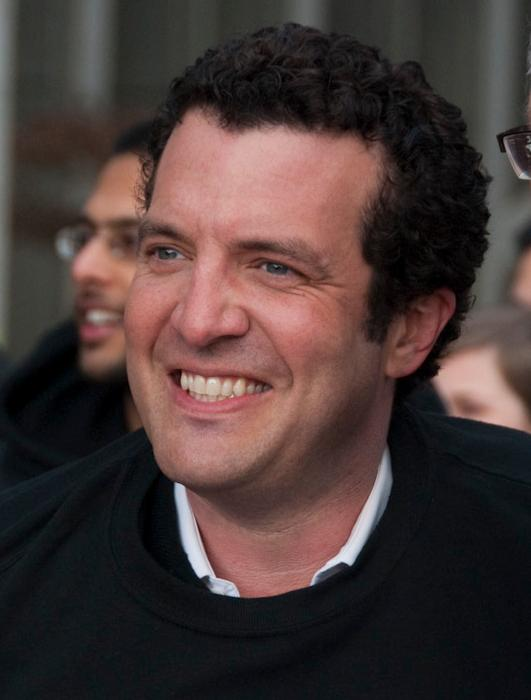
Rick Mercer

- September 16 - Andy Borodow, wrestler
- September 23 - Donald Audette, ice hockey player

=== October to December ===
- October 6 - Jeffrey Lay, rower and Olympic silver medallist
- October 8 - Dylan Neal, actor
- October 17 - Rick Mercer, comedian, television personality and political satirist
- October 30 - Snow, Rapper and musician
- November 1 - Tie Domi, ice hockey player
- November 7 - Tanya Dubnicoff, track cyclist
- November 15 - Helen Kelesi, tennis player
- December 4 - Jacques Landry, cyclist
- December 10 - Rob Blake, ice hockey player
- December 12 - Iain Sydie, badminton player
- December 12
  - Debra Wurzburger, swimmer
  - Kris Wirtz, pair skater
- December 15 - Chantal Petitclerc, wheelchair racer and multiple Paralympic gold medallist
- December 22 - Mauro Ranallo, sports commentator
- December 22 - Myriam Bédard, biathlete and double Olympic gold medallist
- December 30 - Shane McConkey, extreme skier and base jumper (d. 2009)

== Deaths ==
=== January to June ===
- January 4 – Arthur Mørch Hansson, Norwegian diplomat (b. 1910).
- January 19 - Arthur Bourinot, poet
- January 31 - Gail Miller, murder victim (b. circa 1948)
- February 27 - Marius Barbeau, ethnographer and folklorist (b.1883)
- March 18 - John Bracken, politician and 11th Premier of Manitoba (b.1883)
- March 23 - Arthur Lismer, painter and member of the Group of Seven (b.1885)
- June 16 - Harold Alexander, 1st Earl Alexander of Tunis, military commander and Governor General of Canada (b.1891)

=== July to December ===
- August 1 - Fred Landon, historian (b.1880)
- September 8 - Frederick Varley, artist and member of the Group of Seven (b.1881)
- September 12 - Charles Foulkes, General, first Chairman of the Chiefs of Staff, negotiated the WWII Nazi surrender in the Netherlands (b.1903)
- October 10 - Robert Winters, politician and businessman (b.1910)
- November 3 - Parr, artist (b.1893)
- November 11 - John Sissons, barrister, author, judge and politician (b.1892)
- November 14 - Bobbie Rosenfeld, athlete and Olympic gold medallist (b.1904)

== See also ==
- 1969 in Canadian television
- List of Canadian films
