= Stewart and Stewart =

Law firm

- Headquarters: Washington D.C.
- No. of attorneys: 17
- Key people: Terence P. Stewart
- Date founded: 1958
- Founder: Eugene L. Stewart

Stewart and Stewart is a former international law firm based in Washington D.C., recognized for representing mainly U.S. clients in International Trade law actions. The firm had 17 attorneys and represented notable clients in a wide range of industries and agriculture. The firm's practice focused on trade remedies such as antidumping and countervailing duties as well as customs issues, WTO negotiations and disputes, export and import compliance programs, China economic and trade relations, regional trade agreements, and government relations. They are considered one of the nation's leading law firms on securing antidumping and countervailing duties in international trade. The firm's managing partner was widely published trade expert Terence Stewart, son of firm founder Eugene Stewart. In 2019 Stewart retired; the remaining partners merged with Schagrin Associates.

== History ==
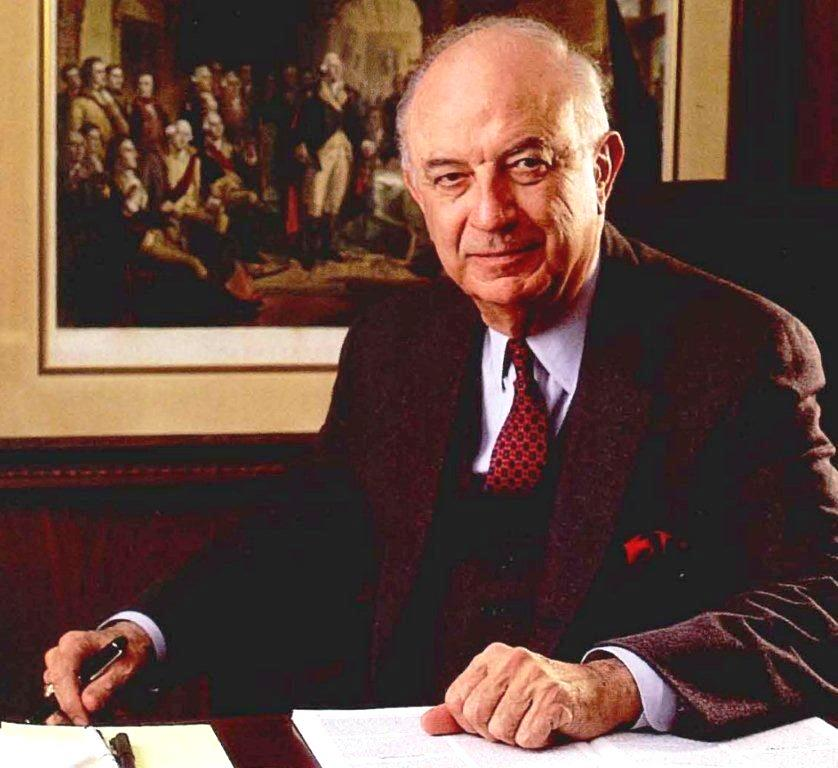
Stewart and Stewart founder Eugene Stewart

Stewart and Stewart was founded by Eugene L. Stewart in 1958. Throughout his career, he was considered a legendary figure and pioneer in the field of international trade law. He was the recipient of numerous awards including the John Carroll Award, an award given to Georgetown University Alumni whose achievements exemplify the ideals and traditions of the university.

The firm was involved in numerous projects that helped the U.S. Congress and various administrations understand the trade system's impact on different sectors of the American economy. In 1965, Eugene Stewart prepared a landmark project for the Trade Relations Council that combined trade data and domestic industry information to permit a more thorough study of the effects of trade on American manufacturing and agriculture. In the late 1970s, the firm handled a series of cases that resulted in significant modifications to the availability of judicial review in trade remedy cases in the Trade Agreements Act of 1979. From 1982 to 2007, approximately 25% of judicial decisions from the United States Court of Appeals for the Federal Circuit involving trade remedies had Stewart and Stewart as counsel for one of the parties involved.

In 1983, Eugene Stewart's son Terence Stewart became a named partner in the firm. Terence acquired the firm from his father in 1986, with Eugene remaining active in the firm until his death in 1998. Terence expanded the reach of the firm in the 1980s by establishing correspondent offices in Belgium and in the 1990s with an office in Russia. The firm's work also includes matters beyond international trade such as government relations, export control, and sanctions work and transaction issues.

== Notable cases ==
The firm has been involved in many notable cases including shrimp, glass, bearings, steel mill products, automobiles and auto parts, tires and other rubber products, chemicals, green technology products, electronic components, cattle, vegetables, cut flowers, paper, industrial equipment, consumer goods, textiles and apparel and many others. The firm also represented the Film & Television Action Committee (FTAC) in their fight over Runaway production, a claim that Canada has unfairly subsidized its entertainment industry causing the loss of tens of thousands of jobs in the United States. Other notable cases include representing the United Steelworkers in an unfair trade practice claim against China in 2010.

=== Off-the-road tires ===
In 2007, the firm brought antidumping and countervailing duty cases on imports of off-the-road tires from China on behalf of the domestic industry. The case was one of the first to counteract Chinese government subsidies benefitting U.S. imports. The firm went on to defend the duties against challenge at the World Trade Organization and in the U.S. courts. The court challenge became the lead case on the issue of whether or not Chinese subsidies can be remedied by the imposition of countervailing duties. The case ultimately led to the passage of legislation by Congress in 2012 clarifying that such duties may be legally imposed. Stewart and Stewart defended the constitutionality of that legislation in court and a decision in favor of the new law was issued in early 2013. Further appeals are possible.

=== Passenger tires ===
Representing the petitioners, the firm won the only successful case filed under the China-specific safeguard mechanism to result in relief to the domestic industry. In 2009 the firm filed a petition for relief from imports of passenger car and light truck tires from China, which were causing job losses and closures in the domestic industry. The petition was filed relying on an agreement made with China when it joined the WTO in 2001 in which it was agreed that temporary safeguard duties could be imposed on China if their imports caused or threatened to cause market disruption. In response to the petition, President Barack Obama imposed three years of import duties on Chinese tires, ranging from 25% to 35%. The firm also supported the U.S. government in defending the duties from challenge at the WTO, and the WTO subsequently found that the duties were fully consistent with the international obligations of the U.S.

=== Green technologies ===
In 2010, Stewart and Stewart filed a petition seeking action against China's that was claimed to distort trade and investment in green technologies such as solar panels, wind turbines, and electric car batteries. The petition alleged that many of these policies violated commitments China had made when it joined the World Trade Organization and asked the Obama Administration to investigate the policies and take appropriate action to bring China into compliance with its WTO commitments. The Administration accepted the petition and initiated an investigation into China's green technology policies in the fall of 2010.

The Administration responded by negotiating some of the issues directly with China while filing challenges at the WTO for others. One such challenge resulted in China agreeing to eliminate a government subsidy to wind turbine producers that were contingent on producers using Chinese components. Another challenge was filed for China's export restraints on rare earths, tungsten, and molybdenum.

=== Cattle and Country-of-Origin Labeling ===
Stewart and Stewart worked to help domestic cattle producers achieve a legal framework for the 2002 Farm Bill in which Congress passed country-of-origin labeling. The firm also helped producers advise the U.S. government in its efforts to defend the labeling law at the World Trade Organization and has advised clients on possible modifications the U.S. could adopt to strengthen COOL as part of the U.S.’s efforts to bring the U.S. regulation in conformance with the WTO decision.

=== Continued Dumping and Subsidy Offset Act of 2000 ===
The firm was instrumental in developing and supporting the Continued Dumping and Subsidy Offset Act (CDSOA) which was enacted on October 28, 2000.

== Government testimony ==
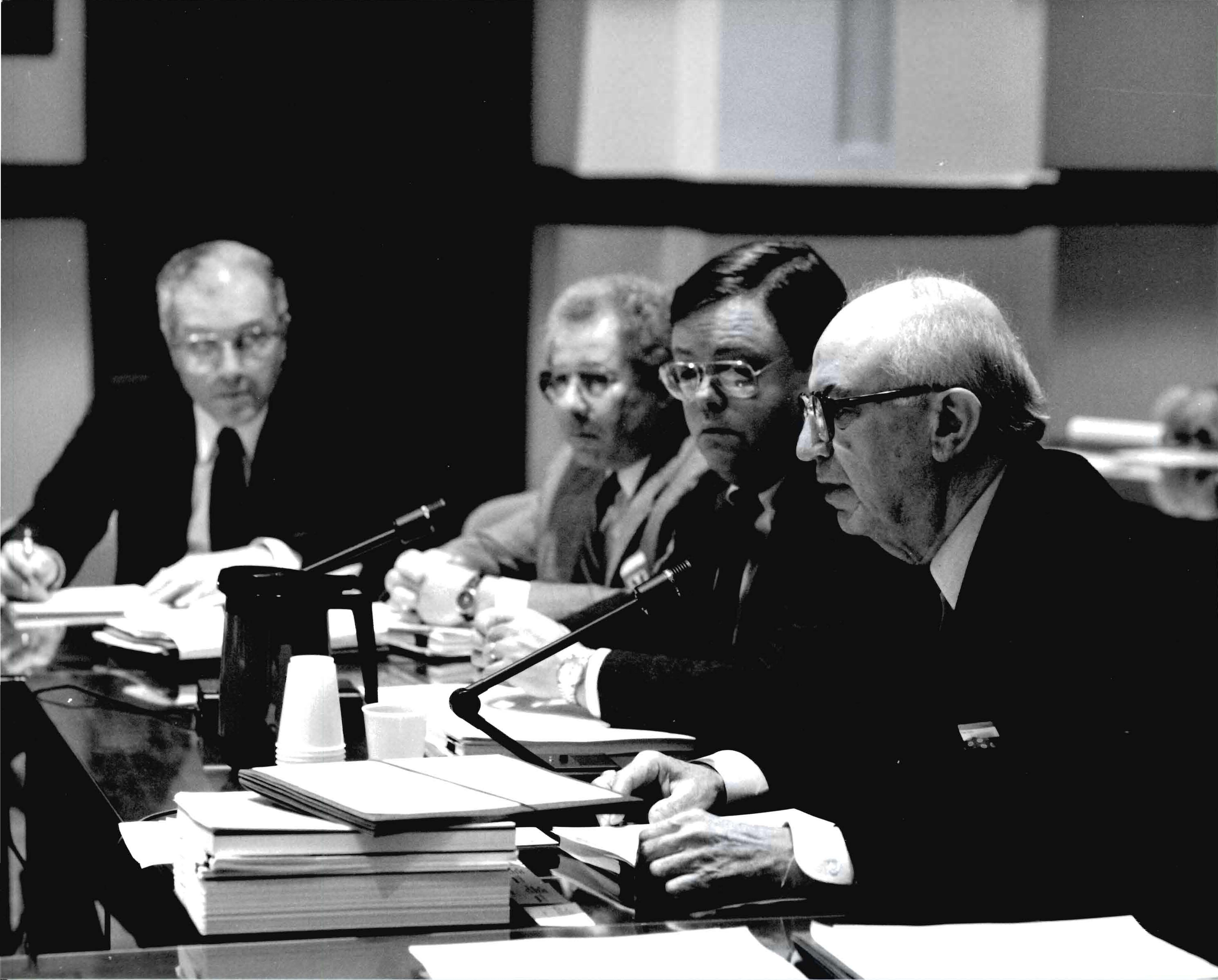
Eugene Stewart testifying before the International Trade Commission in Washington, DC

Attorneys from Stewart and Stewart have given testimony on numerous occasions before the U.S. federal government on many topics including in recent years on trade relations between the United States and China. In 1997, Terence Stewart gave testimony before the House Committee on Ways and Means Subcommittee on Trade regarding China-American relations. In the testimony, Stewart pointed out the importance of China and the United States being trade partners; however, he also disclosed many issues that are believed to cause unfair trade practices.

Terence Stewart was a panelist before the United States-China Economic and Security Review Commission (USCC) in 2009 where he gave a presentation on China's Use of Incentives to Attract Foreign Investment into Certain of its Pillar and Strategic Industries. Firm partner Elizabeth J. Drake presented testimony in 2012 before the USCC. The purpose of the testimony was to provide different policy options for the United States to address Chinese state-owned enterprises.

== Notable current and former personnel ==
- Alan Dunn – Former U.S. Assistant Secretary of Commerce appointed by President George H. W. Bush and served as one of the lead U.S. negotiators in the multilateral GATT Uruguay Round negotiations, which established the World Trade Organization (WTO) and in the North American Free Trade Agreement (NAFTA) negotiations with Mexico and Canada. He also participated in negotiations to resolve a number of sectoral trade disputes, such as the 1991 U.S.-Japan Semiconductor Arrangement.
- Bill Frymoyer – Non-attorney government relations personnel and former Senior Policy Advisor to House Democratic leader Richard "Dick" Gephardt from 1991-2003.
- Kathleen H. Hatfield – Former Legislative Counsel to Senate Appropriations Committee Chairman Robert Byrd. Originally worked for Senator Henry M. "Scoop" Jackson beginning in 1982 but was hired by Senator Ted Kennedy after Jackson died in office. She is also the former Associate Director of International Trade at the National Association of Manufacturers and also worked in the Office of the General Counsel at the U.S. International Trade Commission.
- Jimmie V. Reyna – Former associate in 1986 and partner in 1993. Currently a Judge with the United States Court of Appeals for the Federal Circuit, appointed by President Barack Obama in 2010.
- David S. Johanson – Former associate with the firm and former staff member of the International Trade Counsel on the Republican staff of the Committee on Finance of the United States Senate. Currently a commissioner on the United States International Trade Commission, appointed by President Barack Obama in 2011.
- James R. Holbein – Former associate with the firm and former U.S. secretary for the North American Free Trade Agreement Secretariat, the organization responsible for managing disputes under NAFTA and the current Secretary for the U.S. International Trade Commission.
- Stephen Norton – Formerly handled communications with the firm. Former assistant press secretary at the Office of the United States Trade Representative and former speech writer for U.S. Trade Representative Susan Schwab.
- Margaret Edozien - Former associate with the firm. International attorney and daughter of Joseph Chike Edozien, Nigerian King of Asaba, Delta.
- Eugene L. Stewart – Firm's founder and recognized pioneer in the field of international trade law.
- Terence P. Stewart – Managing partner of Stewart and Stewart.

== Publications ==
Stewart and Stewart has represented clients in international trade relations for more than fifty years and is also considered an authority on international trade, with more than 100 articles, books and other publications being authored by their staff. These publications have been cited by experts in the field of international trade and have been used as a basis for additional reports by others in the field.

Most recently in 2012, the firm released a report entitled China's Support Programs for Automobiles and Auto Parts Under the 12th Five-Year Plan which detailed the effects on China's illegal trading practices on the U.S. auto supply chain. The report was cited by many experts in the field of trade and was used as a basis for further reports in publications such as American Manufacturing and Manufacturing Business Technology. The report was cited by leaders in the U.S. Congress to call for trade enforcement action against China.

- 2012 – China's Support Programs for Automobiles and Auto Parts Under the 12th Five-Year Plan
- 2012 – Policy Options For Addressing Chinese State-Owned And State-Controlled Enterprises
- 2009 – China's Industrial Policy and Its Impact on US. Companies, Workers and the American Economy
- 2009 – Opportunities and Obligations: New Perspectives on Global and US Trade Policy, ISBN 9789041131461
- 1999 – The GATT Uruguay Round: A Negotiating History (1993-1994), Volume IV: The End Game (Part1), ISBN 9789041192929
- 1993 – The GATT Uruguay Round: A Negotiating History 1986-1992, ISBN 9789065447456
- 1991 – Handbook of WTO/GATT Dispute Settlement Online

== Affiliations ==
Stewart and Stewart has a correspondent office with Mr. Bernard Spinoit in Belgium and maintains informal contacts with the offices of Mr. Nikolai Zhdanov in Russia. Both firms are independent of Stewart and Stewart but engage one another for international needs of clients.

Stewart and Stewart is a member of Primerus, a society of top-rated independent law firms.

== Awards and recognitions ==
Stewart and Stewart has been ranked both nationally and in Metropolitan Washington D.C. for its work in International Trade by U.S. News, with a number of their attorneys also being ranked. Many of the firm's attorneys have also achieved an AV Preeminent rating from LexisNexis Martindale-Hubbell, an objective indicator of a lawyer's high ethical standards. The achievement is given to top lawyers after being evaluated by evaluations of lawyers and other members of the bar and the judiciary in the United States and Canada.

Lawyers for the firm have also earned the Super Lawyer title which is given to those selected by peers after numerous phases of independent research, peer nominations, and peer evaluations.

== See also ==
- Runaway production
- United States-China Economic and Security Review Commission
- Byrd Amendment
