= Dagenais =

Dagenais is a surname. Notable people with the surname include:

- Camille Dagenais (1920–2016), Canadian engineer
- Kati Dagenais (born 1969), Canadian musher
- Melissa Dagenais (born 2000), Canadian soccer player
- Pierre Dagenais (born 1978), Canadian ice hockey player
- Sarah Dagenais-Hakim, Canadian actress and singer
- Todd Dagenais (born 1970), American college volleyball coach, former player and author

== See also ==
- Dagenais v Canadian Broadcasting Corp
