= Under the Ribs of Death =

Novel by Canadian author John Marlyn published in 1957

Under the Ribs of Death is a novel by Canadian author John Marlyn. It was originally published in 1957. Considered part of the canon of Canadian immigrant novels, Marlyn’s story uses the portrayal of a Hungarian family to comment on the problems and pressures of cultural assimilation in Canada.

Set during the years leading up to the Great Depression, the story follows Sandor Hunyadi, a young man of Hungarian descent living in the North End of Winnipeg, an immigrant community. In an effort to escape the prejudice and poverty he faces as a Hungarian, he aims to become a successful businessman and adopts an English name. His success is almost complete until his life is suddenly unsettled by misfortune. The novel is divided into two parts, the first depicting Sandor’s childhood and the second depicting his life as a man in his early twenties.

== Plot summary ==
=== Part 1 ===
The novel begins when Sandor Hunyadi is twelve years old. He lives with his family on Henry Avenue in Winnipeg’s North End, a community that is primarily occupied by immigrant families. His parents immigrated to Canada from Hungary, but he is ashamed of and embarrassed by his Hungarian heritage. Sandor blames his family’s poverty on his father, Joseph Hunyadi, because he views him as too generous and idealistic. Herr Hunyadi allows a man named Mr. Laszlo to stay in their home as a boarder and eat their food at no cost, which frustrates Sandor since their family is so poor themselves. He admires Mr. Nagy, a North End businessman, as Sandor sees him as a man who is successful despite his Hungarian background, and he aspires to be like him.

Sandor often fights with the English kids at school, who he refers to as the English Gang. They make fun of him for his poverty and Hungarian heritage. Despite this, he is still envious of them, as he thinks of them as “real Canadians”. He refers to his own group of friends as the Gang, and it consists of young boys named Hank, Louis, Olaf, Willi, Buggsy, Frenchy, and Stan. Most of the boys come from families who immigrated from different parts of Europe, but they are all relatively poor and live on Henry Avenue. They protect each other against the English Gang. When Sandor helps Louis rob a local grocer, he decides to leave the gang by refusing to take stolen money from Louis.

After leaving the Gang, Sandor seeks out Mr. Crawford, the Sunday School superintendent, to help him find a job. He gets a job on the other side of town mowing lawns for rich English ladies, masquerading as Alex Humphrey to make himself seem English. He becomes friends with a boy named Eric Hamilton, the son of one of the women whose lawns he takes care of. Their friendship ends in the winter of that year, when Eric and Mrs. Hamilton run into Sandor looking for an overcoat and shoes at the church’s charity; his true identity is exposed.

That winter, Sandor’s uncle, who he calls Onkel Janos, comes from Europe to live with him and his family. After a few months, Sandor learns that his uncle has been seeing a woman named Fraulein Kleinholtz. Sandor does not approve of his uncle’s choice, as Fraulein Kleiholtz is old and detestable. Onkel Janos intends to marry her because she is rich, and he is ashamed of depending on his sister, Sandor’s mother, to keep a roof over his head. After learning this, Sandor reads a book about a boy who becomes a successful businessman by being honest and working hard, and he plans to seek out Mr. Nagy when the time is right to become just like him.

=== Part 2 ===
Part 2 begins with Sandor at age 24. He works as assistant manager for Mr. Nagy and has worked for the man for ten years. Sandor has rejected his Hungarian name and goes by Alex Hunter, an anglicized variation of his name. Nagy is sick, and Alex has been managing most of the real-estate business. Alex has been under the impression that he will take over the business when Nagy retires, but his plans are ruined when Nagy says that he plans to sell the business instead.

After getting the news about Nagy’s plans, Alex goes home to discover that Onkel Janos is drunk at a bar called Nick’s and needs his help to get home. Janos is depressed and has become an alcoholic because of his unhappy marriage to Fraulein Klienholtz. Alex helps his uncle get home and plans to start looking for a job with a new company the next day.

Alex is turned away from his interview as soon as the man interviewing him discovers that he is Hungarian and not English. He returns to Nagy and discovers that Mrs. Kostanuik has called asking for him. Mr. Kostanuik works as a contractor for Mr. Nagy and must answer to Alex. Alex is wary of Kostanuik because he was thrown out of the Kostanuik household during the young Mary Kostanuik’s birthday when he was a child, and he holds a grudge against them. However, the Kostanuiks are in financial trouble because of Nagy’s plans to sell the business. Mrs. Kostanuik hears that Alex has convinced his rich aunt, Fraulein Kleinholtz, to buy the business from Nagy for him and is seeking his help.

Reluctantly, Alex agrees to keep Kostanuik as a contractor when he takes over the business, and he is invited to their house to celebrate Kostanuik’s continued employment when Alex assigns him his first project. At the Kostanuik’s, Alex reconnects with his childhood friend, Mary, and the two begin seeing each other.

Eventually, Alex and Mary get married move into a house of their own. However, their plans begin to crumble when Alex starts having trouble with his business as the stock market threatens to crash. With the beginning of the Great Depression, Alex goes bankrupt and begins to rely on his family more. He starts to appreciate the relationship he has with them, and acknowledges his Hungarian heritage.

== Characters ==
- Sandor Hunyadi
- Mr. Nagy
- Joseph Hunyadi
- Onkel Janos
- Fraulein Kleinholtz
- Mary Kostanuik

== Bibliography ==
- Marlyn, John. Under the Ribs of Death. New Canadian Library, 2010.
