= Sursum Corda (Washington, D.C.) =

Neighborhood in the US federal district

Coordinates: 38.9053°N 77.0112°W

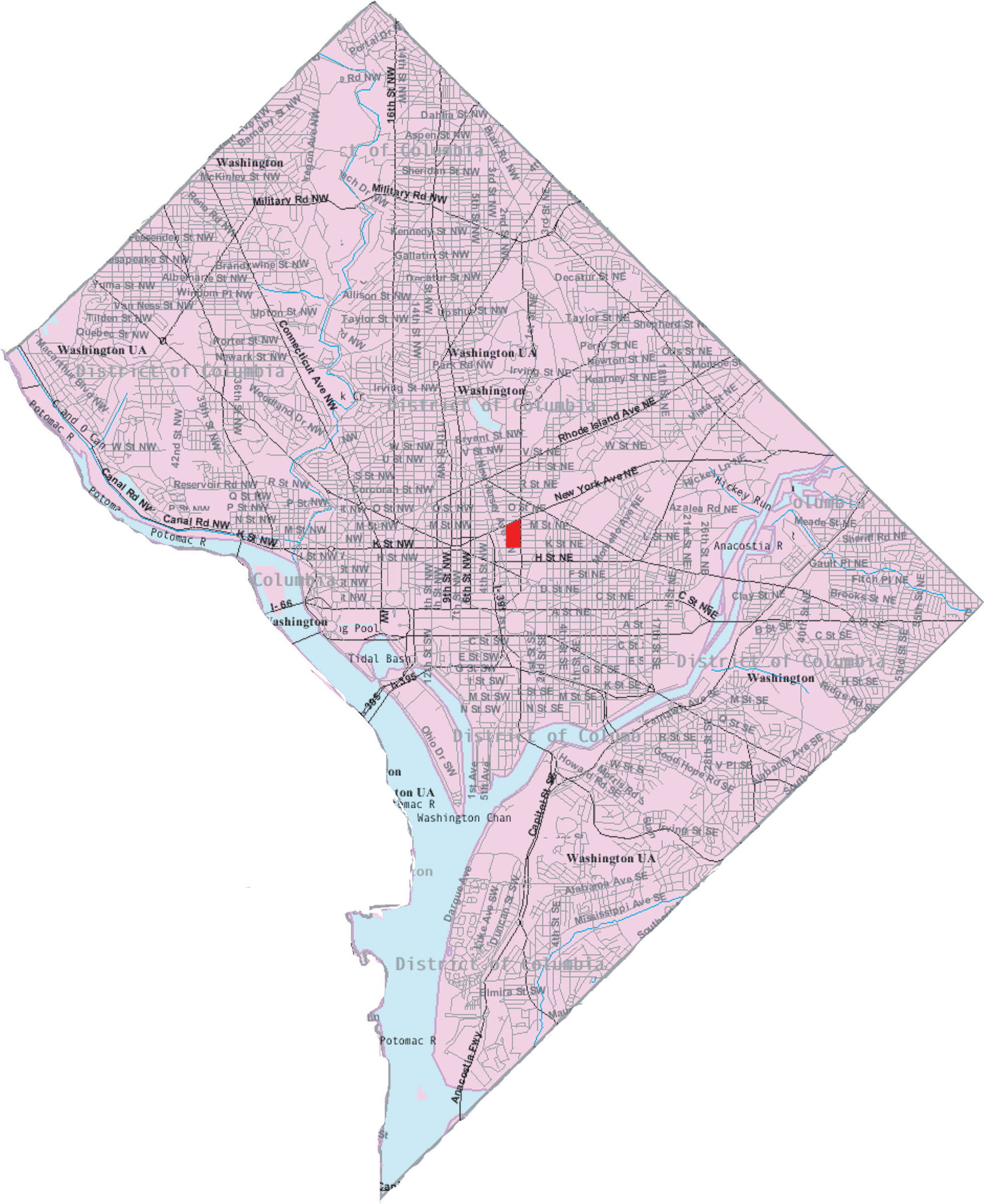
Map of Washington, D.C., with Sursum Corda highlighted in red

Sursum Corda (Latin: "lift up your hearts") is a small neighborhood located in Washington, D.C. It is located in the city’s Northeast and Northwest quadrants. The irregularly shaped neighborhood is bounded by New Jersey Avenue NW, New York Avenue NW & NE, Massachusetts Avenue NW & NE, First Street NW, N Street NW, Florida Avenue NE, Delaware Avenue NE, 2nd Street NE, and the train tracks (both Amtrak/freight and Metro) at NoMa-Gallaudet-U station.

== History ==
In 1965 Eugene L. Stewart, an alumnus of Georgetown University. was asked as a member of the Georgetown Alumni Association if the Association would become involved by sponsoring a low income housing project.

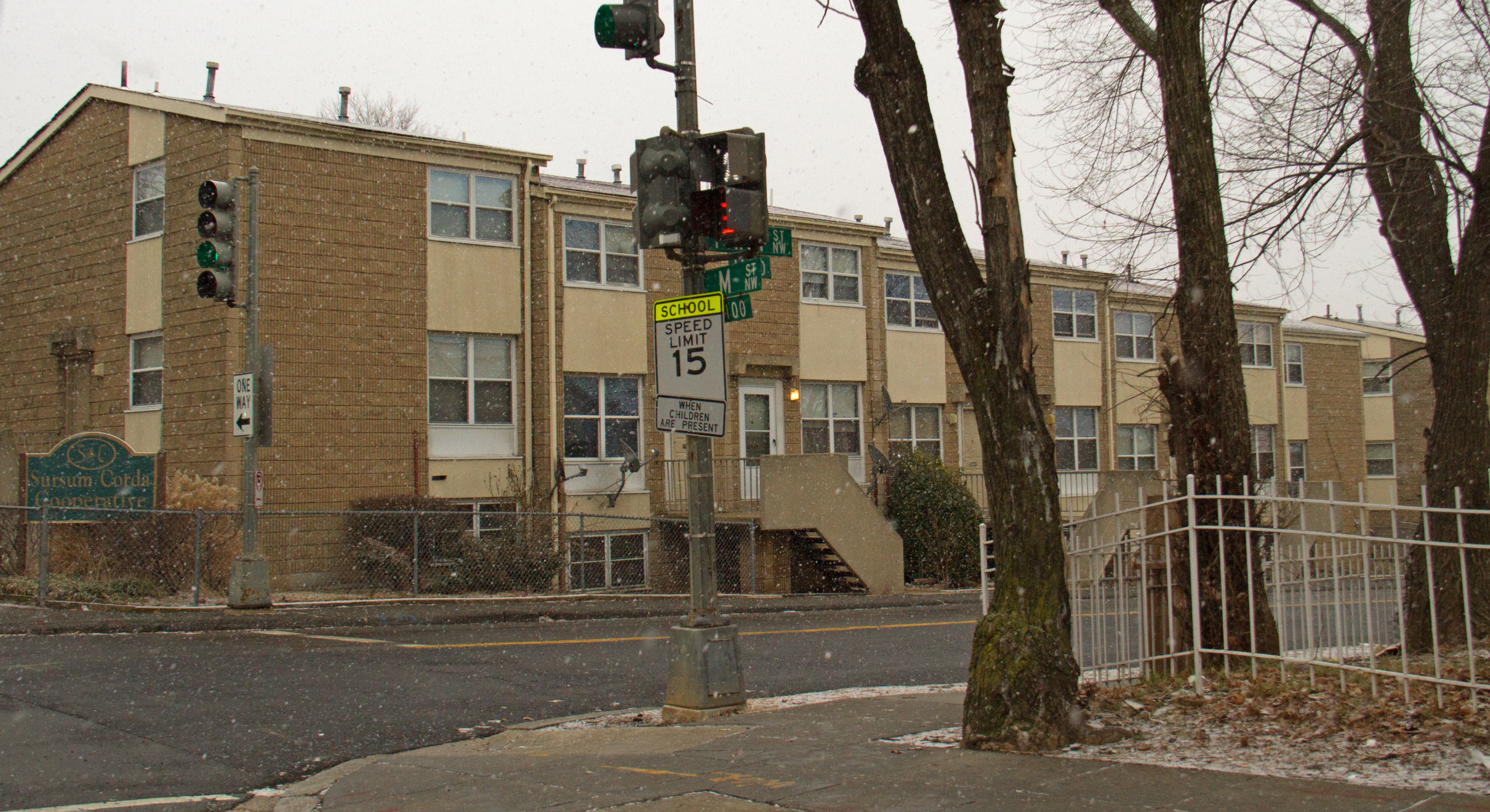
Image of Sursum Corda Cooperative on 1st Street NW, taken in January 2014.

=== Other community landmarks ===
The Sursum Corda neighborhood also contains the Julius Hobson Plaza Condominiums (named for Julius Hobson, a civil rights activist and member of the first elected Council of the District of Columbia), the Severna Apartments, Sibley Plaza, the Turnkey, and the Tyler House Apartments. Sibley Plaza and the Turnkey are both owned by the District of Columbia Housing Authority (DCHA), while the DeSeverna and Tyler House Apartments contain large numbers of units subsidized by the DCHA.

Local landmarks include the Walker-Jones Education Campus (preschool through eighth-grade) on New Jersey Avenue NW between Pierce and L Streets NW and its associated athletic field and basketball courts; the K Street Farm (a 1-acre (4,000 m^{2}) good farm managed by Walker-Jones teachers) on the northwest corner of K Street NW and New Jersey Avenue NW; and the Northwest One Neighborhood Library (built in 2009).

== Neighborhood redevelopment ==
On January 23, 2004, 14-year-old Jahkema "Princess" Hansen was murdered in the Sursum Corda Co-operative. Hansen was involved with 28-year-old Marquette Ward, a known drug dealer. On January 18, 2004, Ward shot and killed 21-year-old Mario J. Evans in a hallway at the Temple Court Apartments for refusing to sell him a discounted drug. Hansen and an 18-year-old girl witnessed the murder. Ward, worried that Hansen would talk to the police, paid 22-year-old Franklin Thompson $8,000 to kill Hansen. While Hansen ate dinner at a friend's apartment in the Sursum Corda Co-op on January 23, Thompson burst into the apartment and opened fire, wounding a 12-year-old girl. Hansen fled through the apartment. Thompson chased her and shot her twice in the head. Thompson and Ward were both convicted of first-degree murder in 2006.

Hansen's murder, which The Washington Post called "heinous" and "execution-style", shocked many residents of the city and drew attention to the terrible housing conditions and severe crime occurring in the neighborhood. It also prodded city officials to spur redevelopment in the area.

=== Northwest One project ===
Determined to change the Sursum Corda neighborhood, the government of the District of Columbia announced a plan to tear down the Sursum Corda Co-op, the Golden Rule housing and retail complex, the Temple Court Apartments, (Note: The Temple Court Apartments consisted a 10-story tower with winding hallways, which allowed crime and drug dealing to occur out of sight.) and other nearby buildings and construct a $700 million mixed use housing, office, and retail center for low-income residents. The city said that William C. Smith & Co., Jair Lynch Partners, Banneker Ventures, and Community Preservation Development would lead the project. Dubbed Northwest One, the project would build 1,630 units (spread among apartments, condominiums, and townhouses), rebuild 40,000 square feet (3,700 m^{2}) of retail space, add 220,000 square feet (20,000 m^{2}) of office space, and construct a 21,000 square feet (2,000 m^{2}) health clinic (to be run by Unity Health Clinic). Northwest One would triple the residential density of the area, and increase low-income housing to 571 units from 410 units. An additional $45 million in city funds would be used to rebuild Walker-Jones Elementary School and construct a new branch library in the area.

Little actual redevelopment occurred, although most of the buildings were demolished. The Sursum Corda co-operative declined to participate in the redevelopment. But the owners of other structures, such as the Golden Rule complex (owned by Bible Way Temple, a nearby church) did. Temple Court Apartments was the largest complex out of the 520 units which fell within the Northwest One boundaries. But the Bush Companies, which owned Temple Court, wanted to back out of the federal and city government-subsidized low-income housing plans and wanted to convert its units to market-rate housing. The District of Columbia exercised eminent domain over Temple Court, seizing it and ensuring it would not block the Northwest One plan. Demolition of the participating structures occurred in 2008, with residents dispersed to other public housing projects in the city. (Note: In addition to the 520 residents at Temple Court Apartments, there were 40 residents displaced from the Golden Way mixed-use complex.) In 2009, the redeveloped Walker-Jones Education Campus and the Northwest One Neighborhood Library opened. But then redevelopment stopped. DCHA never assigned anyone to oversee the project, which left no one to push the developers to fulfill their agreement. DCHA itself was required to move from its headquarters at 1133 North Capitol Street NE to vacate and demolish its own headquarters to make way for the planned new housing, but the agency never did so. DCHA then lost the blueprints for the project, and only relocated them in June 2013. DCHA then discovered—after it had demolished the building—that the Temple Court Apartments were built with a mortgage insured by the United States Department of Housing and Urban Development. This $3.9 million insurance policy required that only subsidized housing could be built on the Temple Court land, but the Northwest One project envisioned market-rate, office, and retail use there. Mayor Adrian Fenty and Mayor Vincent C. Gray both pledged to resolve the issue, but never did. Only two of the many planned Northwest One buildings were constructed. One was the 2M Street Apartments at 2 M Street NE. Built with $16.8 million in DCHA funds, only 93 of its 314 units are subsidized for low-income residents. The other was the Severna Apartments, owned and built by Bible Way Temple. The $15.7 million building (constructed with $1.9 million in DCHA funds) opened in 2011. All of its units are for low-income residents.

=== New Sursum Corda project ===
In August 2015, Sursum Corda Cooperative Association announced it had partnered with Winn Development Co. and adjacent private landowners in the neighborhood to redevelop the Sursum Corda co-op and the surrounding 6.7 acres (27,000 m^{2}) of land into a new high-density, mixed use housing development. The development, which will occur in two phases, will contain more than 1,100 apartments, six times the co-op's current capacity. Five buildings, with 1,280,000 square feet (119,000 m^{2}) of residential space, 41,000 square feet (3,800 m^{2}) of retail space, and 800 parking spaces, will be constructed on two parcels. The first phase, constructed on the parcel at L and 1st Streets NE, will contain three buildings of 164 units, 166 units, and 100 units. The second phase, located at the site of the current Sursum Corda Co-operative Apartments, will see two buildings of 339 units and 373 units.

Starting in November 2018, Toll Brothers development began demolition paving the way for the re-development.
