= Mike Spencer Bown =

Canadian traveler (born c.1969)

Mike Spencer Bown (born c. 1969) is a Canadian traveler who extensively visited numerous locations backpacking over a span of 23 years, and was said to have been the first tourist to Mogadishu in many years. He is a resident of Calgary, Alberta and has traveled for 30 years in over 195 countries. Until recently he has been unwilling to put an exact number on the number of countries visited out of a keenness to avoid arguments about whether some of them are independent nations. In 2020 he had to stop travelling and return to Canada when all of the international borders closed down due to the COVID-19 pandemic.

Bown has written a book about his travels, "The World's Most Travelled Man: A Twenty-Three-Year Odyssey to and through Every Country on the Planet" published by Douglas & McIntyre in October 2018.
