= Laserglow Technologies =

- Company type: Private
- Industry: Photonics
- Founded: 2005; 21 years ago
- Headquarters: Toronto, Ontario, Canada
- Area served: Worldwide
- Key people: Dimitry Fedorov (President); Atul Garg (Vice President)
- Products: Lasers and accessories
- Website: www.laserglow.com

Laserglow Technologies is a Canadian optoelectronics company headquartered in Toronto, Ontario, Canada, specializing in the sale of lasers, particularly DPSS and collimated diode lasers.

The company markets laser systems and components (including laser pointers, portable lasers, and Laboratory/OEM lasers), laser alignment products, optics, and laser accessories, which are used in industry, education and scientific research. The legal entity is called Laserglow.com Ltd., whereas elsewhere the company always refers to itself as Laserglow Technologies or simply Laserglow.

== History ==
Laserglow initially began as a supplier of laser equipment to the educational and hobbyist market. The demand quickly grew in the industrial and scientific markets for laser equipment which led Laserglow to become incorporated in 2005. Laserglow now provides laser systems to a wide variety of scientific fields, including optical imaging, optogenetics, and particle image velocimetry. The company also has a strong social standing due to various contributions to local and international charities, including Kiva and the Stephen Lewis Foundation.

== Innovations ==
Laserglow was the first company to ever design and produce a beam expander that was meant specifically for use on handheld lasers.

The Aries laser series, made by Laserglow, was recommended by the USGA for the purpose of bird abatement.

== Guinness World Record ==
The Hercules 500, made by Laserglow, held the world record for the world's most powerful handheld laser in 2012, and appeared in the Guinness Book of World Records in 2009. The laser was tested three times in five-minute durations using two separate laser power meters, and created an output 1W peak and 940 mW (+/- 20 mW) average power.
