= Eliteweb =

Canadian company

Elite Answers Inc., formerly named landofweebs, is a Toronto-based company that provides corporations and organisations with email marketing, web site development, search engine optimization and corporate social networking tools. Elite Answers began operations with the launch of the Eliteweb.cc search engine on October 11, 2005; the search engine was later renamed EliteAnswers.com. In 2006, the company expanded its offerings to include Elite Email, an e-mail marketing program for small businesses, and other Net-based services.

== Recognition ==
In 2007, the company was named one of Canada's Top 20 Up and Comers by the Branham Group and Backbone Magazine. In 2009, Elite Email was rated one of the top 50 Email Service Providers by Website Magazine.
