= Larry Campbell =

Larry Campbell may refer to:

- Larry Campbell (Canadian politician), Canadian mayor and senator
- Larry Campbell (musician) (born 1955), American multi-instrumentalist
- Larry Campbell (Oregon politician) (born 1931), Republican politician from Oregon
- Larry Campbell (Kansas politician) (born 1955), member of the Kansas House of Representatives
- Larry Joe Campbell (born 1970), American actor and comedian
- Laurence Campbell, British comic artist
- Laurence Campbell (sculptor) (1911–1946), Irish sculptor
