= John Marlyn =

Canadian writer (1912–2005)

- Born: April 2, 1912; Nagybecskerek, Austria-Hungary (now Zrenjanin, Serbia)
- Died: November 16, 2005 (aged 93)
- Occupation: Novelist
- Writing career
- Notable work: Under the Ribs of Death
- Notable awards: Beta Sigma Phi award for best Canadian novel (1957)

John Marlyn (April 2, 1912 – November 16, 2005) was an Austro-Hungarian-born Canadian writer who also used the pseudonym Vincent Reid when writing science fiction.

Marlyn was born in Nagybecskerek (Veliki Bečkerek), Kingdom of Hungary, Austria-Hungary (today Serbia) but grew up in Winnipeg, Manitoba, after arriving in Canada as an infant. During the depression-era 1930s, he found work as a script reader for a film studio in England. Just before World War II, he returned to Canada and worked as a writer for the Canadian government in Ottawa, Ontario. He also taught creative writing at Carleton University 1963–1967.

Marlyn received a Beta Sigma Phi award for his first novel, a tale of poor immigrant life during the 1920s, set in Winnipeg's North End.

Marlyn's papers were acquired by the University of Calgary in 1987.

He lived in the Canary Islands until he died of a heart attack.

== Excerpt ==
"The English," he whispered. "Pa, the only people who count are the English. Their fathers got all the best jobs. They're the only ones nobody ever calls foreigners. Nobody ever makes fun of their names or calls them, 'Baloney-eaters,' or laughs at the way they dress or talk." "Nobody," he concluded bitterly, "cause when you're English it's the same as being Canadian." —Under the Ribs of Death

== Works ==
- Under the Ribs of Death (1957)
- Putzi, I Love You, You Little Square (1981)
- The Baker's Daughter (2000)
