= Dan Lee (animator) =

Canadian–American animator (1969-2005)

- Born: May 19, 1969; Montreal, Quebec, Canada
- Died: January 15, 2005 (aged 35); Berkeley, California, U.S.
- Occupation: Animator
- Years active: 1996–2005
- Employer: Pixar Animation Studios (1996-2005)

Dan Lee (May 19, 1969 – January 15, 2005) was a Canadian-American animator, best known as the character designer of Nemo, the title character from Finding Nemo.

== Early life ==
Lee was born in Montreal, Quebec, in 1969, the youngest of four children of Chinese immigrants and grew up in Scarborough, Ontario, a suburb of Toronto. He graduated with honours from the animation program at Sheridan College in Oakville, Ontario.

== Career ==
He worked on television cartoons and commercials for several studios, including Kennedy Cartoons in Toronto and Colossal Pictures in San Francisco before joining Pixar in June 1996.

He worked as an animator on Darkwing Duck and Goof Troop while at Kennedy Cartoons.

== Personal life ==
Lee died on January 15, 2005, in Berkeley, California, at the age of 35 years old, after suffering from lung cancer for 17 months. Ratatouille was dedicated to him.

== Filmography ==
- A Bug's Life (1998) – Additional character designer, animator, sketch artist
- Toy Story 2 (1999) – Character designer, sketch artist
- Monsters, Inc. (2001) ... Additional character designer
- Finding Nemo (2003) ... Character designer
- Lifted (2006) ... Production artist
- Ratatouille (2007) ... Character designer
