= Kati Dagenais =

Canadian musher

- Born: Kati Alaux; 5 August 1969 (age 56)
- Occupation: Accupuncturist
- Years active: 2007–2017
- Known for: Sled-dog racing

Kati Dagenais (born Kati Alaux 5 August 1969) is a musher, an athlete in sled-dog racing. In 2009 she won the title of world champion in sled-dog racing in the 4-dog and 6-dog categories. In 2013 she won the world championship in 8-dog racing.

== Biography ==
Kati Dagenais is a practicing acupuncturist who accompanied her husband, Martin Dagenais, to sled-dog races. When he was injured in 2008, she stepped in to train the dogs and quickly made a name for herself. She won three of four races in her first year of competitive racing and the following year became world champion.

Dagenais, who was barely five feet tall and less than 100 pounds, began intensive bodybuilding for the strength to control an 8-dog team. Switching from 6-dog to the 8-dog category, Dagenais won the 2010 International Classic for Huskies in Sainte-Agathe-des-Monts.

Dagensais won the 8-dog race at the 2012 Gosford Challenge, setting a new track record of 43 minutes 58.49 seconds. Second and third-place finished 3 and 4 minutes behind her. She followed this with a gold medal win at the 2012 Limited North American Championship in Alaska.

Due to the logistics of air transporting a dog team, Dagenais entered the 6-dog event at the 2015 World Championships in Todtmoos, Germany. Despite further reducing her team to 5 dogs after her head dog was injured, she finished with the bronze medal.

Dagenais won the six-dog event at the 2017 Mauricie Challenge. She noted that there were more female competitors and champions, and suggested that a maternal instinct was appreciated by the dogs.

At the 2017 World Cup in Haliburton, Ontario, Dangenais was left alone on the track when her 8-dog team took off when she stepped off the sled to fix a problem. Competitor Lars Lindh stopped and brought her on his sled for 2 or 3 km (1 or 2 mi) until they caught her team. Dagenais expressed how grateful and impressed she was for Lindh's sportsmanship in putting her safety before precious seconds in the hunt for World Cup gold. Lindh ultimately won gold in the event.

Dagenais was also a regular competitor at the Dryland Canadian Championship Dog Races run on dirt trails in October.

== Awards ==
- First place, 4-dog race, 2008 Kalkaska Winterfest, Kalkaska, Michigan
- First place, 4-dog professional, 2008 Mackinaw Mush in Mackinaw City, Michigan
- First place, 4-dog race, 2008 Rona Dagenais Classic in Ste-Agathe-des-Monts
- Gold medal, 6-dog race, 2009 World Championship in Beauce, Quebec
- Gold medal, 8-dog race, 2010 Rona Dagenais Classic in Sainte-Agathe-des-Monts
- Gold medal, 6-dog 8-mile race, 2012 Limited North American Championship in Fairbanks, Alaska
- First place, 8-dog race, 2012 Gosford Challenge
- Gold medal, 8-dog 12-mile race, 2013 North American IFSS World Championship in North Pole, Alaska
- Bronze medal, 6-dog race, 2015 World Championship in Todtmoos, Germany
- First place, 6-dog race, 2017 Mauricie Challenge

== See also ==
- List of sled dog races
