= Mandatory country-of-origin labeling (US) =

Compulsory food labeling

Country of origin labeling (COOL) (or mCOOL [m for mandatory]) is a requirement signed into American law under Title X of the Farm Security and Rural Investment Act of 2002 (also known as the 2002 Farm Bill), codified at 7 U.S.C. § 1638a as Notice of country of origin. This law had required retailers to provide country-of-origin labeling for fresh beef, pork, and lamb. The program exempted processed meats. The United States Congress passed an expansion of the COOL requirements on September 29, 2008, to include more food items such as fresh fruits, nuts and vegetables. Regulations were implemented on August 1, 2008 (73 FR 45106), August 31, 2008 (73 FR 50701), and May 24, 2013 (78 FR 31367). The 2016 Consolidated Appropriations Act is the latest amendment to the Agricultural Marketing Act of 1946. This act forms the basis of the current COOL requirements.

On December 18, 2015, Congress repealed the original COOL law for beef and pork, as a part of the omnibus budget bill because of a series of WTO rulings that prohibited labels based on country of origin on some products. COOL regulations exist for all other covered commodities such as fresh fruits, raw vegetables, fish, shellfish, muscle cuts and ground lamb, chicken, goat, peanuts, pecans, ginseng, and macadamia nuts.

== Background ==
"Under §304 of the Tariff Act of 1930 as amended (19 U.S.C. § 1304), every imported item must be conspicuously and indelibly marked in English to indicate to the "ultimate purchaser" its country of origin." According to the U.S. Customs, generally defined the "ultimate purchaser" is the last U.S. person who will receive the goods in the form in which it was imported.

However, if the goods are destined for a U.S. based processor where they will undergo "substantial transformation", then that processor or manufacturer is considered the ultimate purchaser. The law authorizes exceptions to labeling requirements, such as for articles incapable of being marked or where the cost would be "economically prohibitive."

Exceptions to this are codified into law and known as the "J List", so named for §1304(a)(3)(J) of the statute, which empowered the Secretary of the Treasury to exempt classes of items that were "imported in substantial quantities during the five-year period immediately preceding January 1, 1937, and were not required during such period to be marked to indicate their origin."

This does not apply to food "processed" in the US with ingredients from other countries. Processed food includes milk, juice, dry foods and dietary supplements/vitamins. A guidance document of the FDA states:

1. An imported product, such as shrimp, is peeled, deveined and incorporated into a shrimp dish, such as "shrimp quiche". The product is no longer identifiable as shrimp but as "quiche". The quiche is a product of the US. So labeling it as "product of the USA" would not be a violation of the FFD&C Act. (Whether or not it violates *CBP's* requirements would need to be asked.)
2. An imported product, such as shrimp, is peeled and deveined. It is labeled as "Imported by" or "Distributed by" a firm in the US. Such labeling would not violate the FFD&C Act, but it would not meet the *CBP's* requirement for country of origin labeling. The product would also have to be clearly identified as to country of origin.

== Analysis ==
The contrasting intents of these bills reflected the continuing divergence of opinion among lawmakers over whether a federally mandated labeling program is needed. Some contend that mandatory COOL will provide U.S. products with a competitive advantage over foreign products because US consumers, if offered a clear choice, prefer fresh foods of domestic origin, thereby strengthening demand and prices for them. Moreover, proponents argue that US consumers have a right to know the origin of their food, particularly at a time when US food imports are increasing, and whenever particular health and safety problems arise. They cite as one prominent example concerns about the safety of some foreign beef arising from the discoveries of bovine spongiform encephalopathy (BSE, or mad cow disease) in a number of Canadian-born cows (and two US cows) since 2003. Supporters of the COOL law argue that it is unfair to exempt meats and produce from the longstanding country labeling already required of almost all other imported consumer products, from automobiles to most other foods. They also note that many foreign countries already impose their own country-of-origin labeling.

Opponents of mandatory COOL counter that studies do not provide evidence that consumers want such labeling. They believe COOL is a thinly disguised trade barrier intended to increase importers' costs and to foster the unfounded perception that imports may be inherently less safe (or of lower quality) than US products. Food safety problems can as likely originate in domestic supplies as in imports, as evidenced by the more than 30 recalls of US meat and poultry products announced by USDA in 2006 alone, these opponents point out. Opponents argue that all food imports already must meet equivalent US safety standards, which are enforced by US officials at the border and overseas; scientific principles, not geography, must be the arbiter of safety. Industry implementation and record-keeping costs, estimated by USDA to be as high as $3.9 billion in the first year and $458 million per year after that, would far outweigh any economic benefits, critics add. (COOL proponents assert that these cost estimates were grossly exaggerated while some in industry claim they were too low).

== Canadian challenge to COOL ==
In 2009, the Canadian government launched a challenge to mCOOL at the World Trade Organization (WTO). The Canadian federal government argued before the WTO that American "country of origin" labelling rules (COOL) actually worked to the detriment of the meat industry on both sides of the border by increasing costs, lowering processing efficiency and otherwise distorting trade across the Canada-U.S. border. Mexico made similar claims.

In 2011, Canada said the WTO ruled in Canada's favor. The US said the panel affirmed the right of the United States to require country of origin labeling for meat products. Canada and Mexico asked the WTO for another review and permission to impose more than $2 billion a year in retaliatory tariffs, and the ruling was made public in summer 2014.

In May 2015, the WTO upheld its previous ruling that the U.S. COOL requirements discriminated against Canadian and Mexican livestock. The two countries asked the WTO to authorize US$3 billion in retaliatory tariffs against U.S. imports. In early December 2015, the WTO determined the impact of the COOL requirements on the Canadian and Mexican economies at $1.1 billion and authorized Canada and Mexico to impose $781 million and $228 million, respectively, in retaliatory tariffs against U.S. imports.

In March 2016, a USDA rule was published in the Federal Register for the "Removal of Mandatory Country of Origin Labeling Requirements for Beef and Pork Muscle Cuts, Ground Beef, and Ground Pork".

== Rumoured revival (2021) ==
In February 2021, South Dakota Senator John Thune asked USDA secretary Tom Vilsack during his Senate confirmation hearing whether he would support a return to mCOOL rules, and he said "If there's a way to get it to be WTO compliant, I would be more than happy to work with you." In spring 2021, the CBC remarked that a representative from the R-CALF trade lobby said: "[When] we had those labels in place [it] happened to coincide with the highest nominal prices paid to cattle producers in history".

== See also ==
- Food labeling regulations
- Track and trace
- Packaging and labeling
- Made in USA
