= Byrd Amendment =

- Long title: Continued Dumping and Subsidy Offset Act of 2000
- Acronyms (colloquial): CDSOA
- Nicknames: Byrd Amendment
- Enacted by: the 106th United States Congress

Legislative history
- Signed into law by President Bill Clinton on October 28, 2000

The Byrd Amendment is also known as the Continued Dumping and Subsidy Offset Act of 2000 (CDSOA). It passed as title X of Pub. L. 106–387 (text) (PDF).

== Substance ==
The act is American legislation closely associated with its chief sponsor, Democratic Senator Robert Byrd of West Virginia. The act changed the disposition of funds raised from duties on imports that the US government has determined to be subsidized or otherwise unfairly priced. Prior to the act, those funds were incorporated into the US budget. The Act specifies that the funds be distributed to the US companies that file pricing complaints. In short, this meant that non-US firms which sell below cost price in the US can be fined, and the money given to the US companies who made the complaint in the first place.

== Duration ==
Congress enacted the Byrd Amendment on October 28, 2000, and repealed it on December 21, 2005.

== History ==
On July 21, 2001, the European Commission and eight other countries – Australia, Brazil, Chile, India, Indonesia, Japan, South Korea and Thailand — Filed a formal protest with the World Trade Organization (WTO). The European Commission claimed that since 2000, US companies had received $1 billion in anti-dumping fees redistributed to them under the Byrd Amendment. In 2002, the WTO ruled the Byrd Amendment wholly illegal. It said that the European Union (EU) and the other countries could introduce measures which penalize the US for up to 72% of the monies raised and distributed through the Byrd Amendment.

On April 4, 2005, now with the permission of the WTO, the EU announced plans to implement limited sanctions on a selection of US goods, charging a 15% levy on U.S. paper, farm goods, textiles and machinery from May 1, 2005. This was in light of the continuing failure of the United States to bring its legislation into conformity with its international obligations. Also, on May 1, Canada imposed a 15% surtax sanction on US imports of cigarettes, oysters and live swine. On September 1, 2005, the Japanese government introduced 15% retaliatory duties on U.S. steel imports.

For years, President George W. Bush called for the Act's repeal; however, this was met with little progress. Eventually, after growing pressure on multiple fronts, the 109th United States Congress in December 2005 and January 2006 repealed the amendment. The act's provisions stayed in place until October 1, 2007, and money continued to be redirected to companies during this time. For example, American Italian Pasta Company, in a Form 10-Q dated August 6, 2008, recognized "dumping and subsidy offset payments" attributed to the Act of $2.959 million for its fiscal year 2007 and $4.64 million for fiscal year 2008.
