= Deaths in September 2021 =

The following is a list of notable deaths in September 2021.

Entries for each day are listed alphabetically by surname. A typical entry lists information in the following sequence:

- Name, age, country of citizenship at birth, subsequent country of citizenship (if applicable), reason for notability, cause of death (if known), and reference.

== September 2021 ==
=== 1 ===
- Assyr Abdulle, 50, Swiss mathematician.
- Janet Adam, 81, Scottish potter and sculptor.
- Adalberto Álvarez, 72, Cuban pianist (Son 14), COVID-19.
- Eiliv Anderson, 87, Canadian politician, Saskatchewan MLA (1975–1978).
- Jean-Denis Bredin, 92, French attorney, founder of Bredin Prat and member of the Académie Française.
- Anna Cataldi, 81, Italian journalist and humanitarian.
- Paul Chillan, 85, French footballer (US Robert, Nîmes, Arles).
- Jürgen Ciezki, 69, German Olympic weightlifter.
- Daffney, 46, American professional wrestler (WCW, SHINE, TNA), suicide by gunshot.
- Noel Dellow, 92, New Zealand cricketer (Canterbury).
- Giles Easterbrook, 72, British music publisher and composer.
- Charles Ford, 90, American politician.
- Carol Fran, 87, American soul blues singer, pianist, and songwriter, complications from COVID-19.
- Jim Fuller, 76, American football player and coach (Alabama Crimson Tide, Jacksonville State Gamecocks), complications from COVID-19.
- Syed Ali Shah Geelani, 91, Indian Kashmiri separatist leader, Jammu and Kashmir MLA (1972–1982, 1987–1990).
- Alison Gray, 78, New Zealand writer and social researcher, motor neuron disease.
- Doug Green, 66, American politician, member of the Ohio House of Representatives (2013–2020), COVID-19.
- José Gonçalves Heleno, 93, Brazilian Roman Catholic prelate, coadjutor bishop (1976–1977) and bishop of Governador Valadares (1977–2001).
- Waldo Holmes, 92, American trumpeter and songwriter (Rock the Boat).
- Norbert Klein, 65, Dutch politician, MP (2012–2017).
- Catherine MacPhail, 75, Scottish author (Roxy's Baby).
- George Martin, 83, Spanish actor (Kiss Kiss...Bang Bang, Clint the Stranger, The Return of Clint the Stranger).
- Chandan Mitra, 65, Indian journalist (The Pioneer) and politician, MP (2003–2016).
- David Moursund, 84, American mathematician and computer scientist.
- Norberto Mario Oyarbide, 70, Argentine judge, justice of the Supreme Court (1994–2016), COVID-19.
- Allison Payne, 57, American news anchor (WGN-TV).
- Juan Rodríguez Vega, 77, Chilean footballer (Unión Española, Atlético Español, national team).
- Leopoldo Serantes, 59, Filipino boxer, Olympic bronze medallist (1988), COPD.
- Margaret Stone, Australian judge, inspector-general of intelligence and security (2015–2020).
- Dan Swecker, 74, American politician, member of the Washington State Senate (1995–2013), complications from COVID-19.
- Carlos Thorne, 98, Peruvian novelist and lawyer.
- Sid Watson, 93, English footballer (Mansfield Town, Ilkeston Town).
- Kurt Zwikl, 72, American politician, member of the Pennsylvania House of Representatives (1973–1984).

=== 2 ===
- Hans Antonsson, 86, Swedish wrestler, Olympic bronze medallist (1960).
- Efren Arroyo, 68, Puerto Rican journalist (WAPA-TV, WKAQ-TV, WKAQ-AM), COVID-19.
- Baron Browne, 66, American bass guitarist.
- Michel Corboz, 87, Swiss conductor.
- Manuel Soares Costa, 88, Portuguese politician, minister of agriculture (1983–1984).
- Daniele Del Giudice, 72, Italian author and lecturer, complications from Alzheimer's disease.
- Alemayehu Eshete, 80, Ethiopian singer.
- Donald Harkness, 90, Australian cricketer.
- Ruth Bradley Holmes, 96, American Cherokee language linguist and educator.
- Vladimír Hubáček, 89, Czech rally driver.
- Aydin Ibrahimov, 82, Azerbaijani wrestler, Olympic bronze medallist (1964), COVID-19.
- Gurbanmuhammet Kasymow, 67, Turkmen politician and lawyer, minister of internal affairs (1993–1998), defense (1998–1999), and justice (1999–2001), COVID-19.
- Bobby Lackey, 83, American football player (Texas Longhorns).
- Steve Lawler, 56, American professional wrestler and trainer, COVID-19.
- Mad Clip, 34, Greek rapper, traffic collision.
- Keith McCants, 53, American football player (Alabama Crimson Tide, Tampa Bay Buccaneers, Houston Oilers).
- Josephine Medina, 51, Filipino table tennis player, Paralympic bronze medallist (2016).
- Ataullah Mengal, 92, Pakistani politician, chief minister of Balochistan (1972–1973), heart attack.
- Isabel da Nóbrega, 96, Portuguese writer.
- David Patten, 47, American football player (New York Giants, New England Patriots, Washington Redskins), traffic collision.
- Stanley Rachman, 87, Canadian psychologist.
- Ryan Sakoda, 48, Japanese-American professional wrestler (EWF, WWE).
- Sidharth Shukla, 40, Indian actor (Broken But Beautiful, Balika Vadhu, Dil Se Dil Tak) and reality show contestant, heart attack.
- Hashibur Rahman Swapon, 67, Bangladeshi politician, MP (1996–1998, since 2014), COVID-19.
- Mikis Theodorakis, 96, Greek composer ("Mauthausen Trilogy", Zorba the Greek, Z), MP (1981–1993).
- Frederick L. Van Sickle, 78, American jurist, judge (since 1991) and chief judge (2000–2005) of the U.S. District Court for Eastern Washington.
- Joan Washington, 74, British dialect coach (101 Dalmatians, Notes on a Scandal, Crimson Peak), lung cancer.
- Frankie Welch, 97, American fashion designer, dementia.
- John M. Williams, 85, American college football coach (Mississippi College).
- Anne Wingate, 77, American author.

=== 3 ===
- Muhammad Saeed al-Hakim, 85, Iraqi marja', heart attack.
- Atanas Atanasov, 85, Bulgarian Olympic basketball player.
- Beryl Atkins, 90, British lexicographer.
- Ljubo Bešlić, 63, Bosnian politician, mayor of Mostar (2004–2021).
- David Borwein, 97, Canadian mathematician.
- Raghunath Chandorkar, 100, Indian cricketer (Maharashtra).
- Marian Collier, 90, American actress (Mr. Novak, Lethal Weapon, Timeline).
- Janet Doub Erickson, 97, American graphic artist and writer.
- Hassan Firouzabadi, 70, Iranian military officer, chief of staff of the Armed Forces (1989–2016), COVID-19.
- Barbara Inkpen, 71, British Olympic high jumper (1968, 1972).
- Philip Jamison, 96, American watercolorist.
- Juan Kahnert, 93, Argentine Olympic shot putter (1948).
- Irma Kalish, 96, American television writer and producer (Good Times, The Facts of Life, Family Affair), complications from pneumonia.
- Yolanda López, 78, American painter, printmaker, and film producer, cancer.
- Sérgio Mamberti, 82, Brazilian actor (O Baiano Fantasma, The Lady from the Shanghai Cinema, Castelo Rá-Tim-Bum), multiple organ failure.
- Attilio Maseri, 85, Italian cardiologist.
- Bernadetta Matuszczak, 84, Polish composer.
- Enrique Molina, 77, Cuban actor (The Man from Maisinicu, Hello Hemingway, Video de Familia), COVID-19.
- Ruth Olay, 97, American jazz singer.
- Ahamed Samsudeen, 32, Sri Lankan terrorist (2021 Auckland supermarket stabbing), shot.
- Shinichiro Sawai, 83, Japanese film director (W's Tragedy, Early Spring Story, Bloom in the Moonlight), multiple organ failure.
- Nestor Soriano, 67, Filipino Olympic sailor (1988), COVID-19.
- Henriette Valium, 62, Canadian comic book artist and painter.
- Abram van Heerden, South African Olympic sprinter.
- Andrew Walker, 67, Scottish murderer, respiratory infection.
- John Watkins, 98, South African cricketer (Natal, national team), COVID-19.
- Robert C. Wetenhall, 86, American executive of Canadian football, owner of the Montreal Alouettes (1997–2018).
- Betty Wood, 76, British historian and academic, cancer.

=== 4 ===
- Billy Cafaro, 84, Argentine singer.
- Bohumil Cepák, 70, Czech Olympic handball player (1976).
- Paula Clayton, 86, American psychiatrist.
- Gerhard Erber, 86, German classical pianist.
- Dell Furano, 70, American music industry executive and entrepreneur, CEO of Live Nation Entertainment (2008–2012).
- Rune Gerhardsen, 75, Norwegian politician and sports executive, mayor of Oslo (1992–1997), leader of the AUF (1973–1975), and three-time chairman of the NSF.
- Albert Giger, 74, Swiss cross country skier, Olympic bronze medalist (1972), cancer.
- Léonard Groguhet, 82, Ivorian actor (Ma Famille) and comedian.
- Bernard Holdridge, 86, British Anglican priest, archdeacon of Doncaster (1994–2001).
- Derek Hole, 87, British Anglican priest, provost of Leicester Cathedral (1992–1999).
- Tunch Ilkin, 63, Turkish-born American football player (Pittsburgh Steelers) and broadcaster, complications from amyotrophic lateral sclerosis.
- Christian Lenglolo, 39, Cameroonian footballer (Persipura Jayapura, Persikota Tangerang, Sriwijaya), heart attack.
- David Pallister, 76, British investigative journalist (The Guardian, Exaro).
- Mort Ransen, 88, Canadian film director (Margaret's Museum) and screenwriter, dementia.
- Nicole Saeys, 97, Belgian Olympic javelin thrower (1948).
- Jörg Schlaich, 86, German structural engineer.
- Willard Scott, 87, American weatherman (WRC-TV, Today), creator of Ronald McDonald.
- Martin Thompson, 65, New Zealand artist.
- Greta Tomlinson, 94, English artist.
- Alberto Vilar, 80, American investment manager, arts patron and convicted fraudster.
- Lydia Wevers, 71, Dutch-born New Zealand literary critic, editor and historian.

=== 5 ===
- Carmen Balthrop, 73, American operatic soprano.
- Eugene N. Borza, 86, American historian.
- Ion Caramitru, 79, Romanian actor (Citizen X, Adam & Paul, Charlie Countryman) and politician, minister of culture (1996–2000).
- Chung Jen-pi, 88–89, Chinese potehi puppeteer.
- Ezio Della Savia, 79, Italian Olympic swimmer (1960, 1964).
- Keshav Desiraju, 66, Indian bureaucrat and mental health advocate, cardiac arrest.
- Christian Dutoit, 80, French journalist.
- Sándor Egeresi, 57, Serbian politician, president of the Assembly of Vojvodina (2008–2012).
- Muhammad Fahim Dashti, 48, Afghan journalist and resistance leader, spokesperson for the National Resistance Front, shot.
- Marcel Garrouste, 100, French politician, mayor of Penne-d'Agenais (1971–1983) and deputy (1976–1986, 1988–1993).
- Sarah Harding, 39, English singer (Girls Aloud) and actress (Run for Your Wife, St Trinian's 2: The Legend of Fritton's Gold), breast cancer.
- Jan Hecker, 54, German lawyer and diplomat, judge of the Federal Administrative Court (2011–2015) and ambassador to China (since 2021).
- Leni Hofknecht, 92, German Olympic long jumper.
- Robert P. Hollenbeck, 89, American politician, member of the New Jersey General Assembly (1974–1986).
- Ralph Irizarry, 67, American percussionist and bandleader, multiple organ failure.
- Susana Lanteri, 86, Argentine actress (Argentino hasta la muerte, Los golpes bajos).
- Jonah Lwanga, 76, Ugandan Orthodox prelate, metropolitan of Kampala and all Uganda (since 1997).
- Matej Marin, 41, Slovenian racing cyclist.
- Jerry Mertens, 85, American football player (San Francisco 49ers).
- Jonathan Mirsky, 88, American journalist and historian.
- Donncha Ó Dúlaing, 88, Irish broadcaster (RTÉ Radio).
- Ivan Patzaichin, 71, Romanian sprint canoeist and coach, four-time Olympic champion, lung cancer.
- Živko Radišić, 84, Bosnian politician, chairman of the Presidency (1998–1999, 2000–2001) and mayor of Banja Luka (1977–1982).
- João Sayad, 75, Brazilian economist, blood cancer.
- Tony Selby, 83, English actor (Get Some In!, Doctor Who, Witchfinder General), COVID-19.
- Nell Sjöström, 88, Swedish Olympic sprinter (1952).
- Viv Stephens, 67, New Zealand cricket player (Wellington, Central Districts, national team) and administrator.
- John A. Terry, 88, American jurist, judge of the District of Columbia Court of Appeals (1982–2016), heart failure.
- Roger Weissberg, 69, American psychologist, cancer.

=== 6 ===
- Jean-Pierre Adams, 73, French footballer (Nîmes, Nice, national team).
- Billy Apple, 85, New Zealand painter and sculptor.
- Peter Arnold, 94, New Zealand cricketer (Northamptonshire, Canterbury).
- Claude Azéma, 78, French Roman Catholic prelate, auxiliary bishop of Montpellier (2003–2018).
- Adam Baumann, 73, Polish actor (Śmierć jak kromka chleba, Wojaczek, Destined for Blues).
- Jean-Paul Belmondo, 88, French actor (Breathless, That Man from Rio, Pierrot le Fou), César winner (1989).
- Peter Bentley, 91, Austrian-born Canadian businessman.
- Stanley J. Brasher, 93, American politician.
- Nino Castelnuovo, 84, Italian actor (Rocco and His Brothers, The Umbrellas of Cherbourg, The Five Man Army).
- Thierry Choffat, 53, French political scientist.
- Cockie van der Elst, 93, Dutch Olympic speed skater (1952).
- Yolanda Fernández de Cofiño, 86, Guatemalan businesswoman and philanthropist.
- Jennifer Fiori, 35, Italian racing cyclist, traffic collision.
- Enrique González Pedrero, 91, Mexican politician, senator (1970–1976) and governor of Tabasco (1982–1987).
- Derek Goodrich, 94, British Anglican clergyman, dean of St. George's Cathedral, Georgetown (1984–1993).
- Anthony Johnson, 55, American actor (House Party, Friday, Menace II Society) and comedian, multiple organ failure.
- Zanele kaMagwaza-Msibi, 59, South African politician, MP (2014–2019), cardiac arrest from COVID-19.
- Tomasz Knapik, 77, Polish film, radio, and television reader.
- Eberhard Kulenkampff, 93, German-Namibian architect and city planner.
- Dick Parfitt, 90, American college basketball coach (Central Michigan Chippewas).
- Pedrés, 89, Spanish bullfighter.
- Sunil Perera, 68, Sri Lankan vocalist (The Gypsies), complications from COVID-19.
- Frank Russell, 72, American basketball player (Detroit Titans, Chicago Bulls), complications from COVID-19.
- Todd Scully, 72, American Olympic racewalker (1976), traffic collision.
- Hadj Smaine Mohamed Seghir, 88, Algerian actor (The Battle of Algiers, The Winds of the Aures, Chronicle of the Years of Fire).
- Alec Smith, 91, British trade unionist, president of the Trades Union Congress (1991). (death announced on this date)
- Adlai Stevenson III, 90, American politician, senator (1970–1981), member of the Illinois House of Representatives (1965–1967), and Illinois Treasurer (1967–1970), complications from dementia.
- Anthony Ukpo, 74, Nigerian politician, military governor of Rivers State (1986–1988).
- Károly Vass, 77, Hungarian Olympic handballer (1972, 1976).
- Iván Vitányi, 96, Hungarian philosopher and politician, MP (1990–2014).
- Ernst Walder, 93, Austrian actor (Coronation Street).
- Michael K. Williams, 54, American actor (The Wire, Boardwalk Empire, 12 Years a Slave), accidental drug overdose.
- Severian Yakymyshyn, 91, Canadian Ukrainian Greek Catholic hierarch, bishop of New Westminster (1995–2007).
- Donald Zec, 102, British journalist (Daily Mirror).
- Sabina Zimering, 98, Polish-American ophthalmologist and memoirist.

=== 7 ===
- Noubir Amaoui, 85, Moroccan trade unionist.
- Rick Arrington, 74, American football player (Philadelphia Eagles).
- Edward Barnes, 92, British television executive and producer, co-creator of Blue Peter.
- Richard Batterham, 85, British potter.
- Carl Bean, 77, American Protestant church leader, singer ("I Was Born This Way") and LGBT rights activist.
- Terry Brennan, 93, American college football player and coach (Notre Dame).
- Jahangir Butt, 78, Pakistani field hockey player, Olympic champion (1968).
- Elizabeth A. Clark, 82, American patrologist.
- Sam Cunningham, 71, American football player (New England Patriots).
- Sir John Herbecq, 99, British civil servant.
- Alan Hofmann, 90, American physiologist and biochemist.
- Amanda Holden, 73, British musician, librettist (Bliss) and translator.
- Daikichi Irokawa, 96, Japanese historian.
- Elaine Kasimatis, 69, American mathematician.
- Issei Kitagawa, 78, Japanese politician, member of the House of Councillors (2004–2016), prostate cancer.
- Jay Leiderman, 50, American lawyer, heart attack.
- Steve Pugh, 60, American politician, member of the Louisiana House of Representatives (2008–2020).
- Martha Patricia Ramírez Lucero, 69, Mexican lawyer and politician, deputy (2018-2021).
- Thanwa Raseetanu, 50, Thai luk thung singer, COVID-19.
- Diem Saunders, 29, Canadian writer and activist.
- Phil Schaap, 70, American disc jockey and jazz historian.
- Badri Spanderashvili, 51, Georgian football player (Spartak Vladikavkaz, Rostov) and manager (Bataysk-2007).
- Warren Storm, 84, American swamp pop singer and drummer.
- Antoni Tołkaczewski, 87, Polish Olympic swimmer (1952).
- Bill White, 76, American professional wrestler (WWE, GCW, JCP).
- Eiichi Yamamoto, 80, Japanese film director (Belladonna of Sadness, Little Wansa) and screenwriter (Space Battleship Yamato).
- Ameer Zaman, 65, Pakistani politician, MP (2013–2018) and minister of postal services (2017–2018), complications from diabetes.

=== 8 ===
- Sir Antony Acland, 91, British diplomat, ambassador to the United States (1986–1991).
- Abbas Ansarifard, 65, Iranian football executive, chairman of Persepolis (1990–1993, 2001, 2009), COVID-19.
- Derek Bailey, 48, American tribal leader and convicted sex offender, chairman of the Grand Traverse Band of Ottawa and Chippewa Indians (2008–2012).
- Guido Caroli, 94, Italian Olympic speed skater.
- José Augusto Delgado, 83, Brazilian jurist, judge of the Superior Court of Justice (1995–2008).
- Gérard Farison, 77, French footballer (Saint-Étienne, ÉFC Fréjus, national team).
- Big Daddy Graham, 68, American radio presenter (WIP-FM) and comedian, heart failure.
- Franco Graziosi, 92, Italian actor (The Terrorist, Duck, You Sucker!, We Have a Pope).
- Charles Richard Harington, 88, Canadian zoologist.
- Amy Hawkins, 110, Welsh supercentenarian, nation's oldest person.
- M. Staser Holcomb, 89, American vice admiral.
- Betty Karnette, 89, American politician, member of the California State Assembly (1992–1994, 2004–2008) and Senate (1996–2004).
- Guido Lanfranco, 90, Maltese writer.
- Mark Litchman, 96, American politician, member of the Washington House of Representatives (1955–1973).
- Uno Loop, 91, Estonian singer and musician.
- Juan Guillermo López Soto, 74, Mexican Roman Catholic prelate, bishop of Cuauhtémoc-Madera (since 1995), COVID-19.
- Dietmar Lorenz, 70, German judoka, Olympic champion (1980).
- Aleksandr Melnik, 63, Russian film director (Terra Nova, Territory) and screenwriter, fall.
- Art Metrano, 84, American actor (Police Academy, They Shoot Horses, Don't They?, Joanie Loves Chachi) and comedian.
- Amobé Mévégué, 52, Cameroonian journalist and radio host, malaria.
- Claude Montmarquette, 78, Canadian economist.
- Robert Prizeman, 68, British composer.
- Pulamaipithan, 85, Indian lyricist (Kudiyirundha Koyil, Neengal Kettavai, Manjal Nila).
- Jordi Rebellón, 64, Spanish actor (Hospital Central, Médico de familia, Sin identidad), stroke.
- Robert A. Rovner, 77, American politician and lawyer, member of the Pennsylvania State Senate (1971–1974).
- Igor Shklyarevsky, 83, Russian poet and translator, COVID-19.
- Sadanand Singh, 78, Indian politician, Bihar MLA (1969–2020).
- Neddy Smith, 76, Australian serial criminal.
- Matthew Strachan, 50, English composer (Who Wants to Be a Millionaire?) and singer-songwriter (Next Door's Baby).
- Ludovico Vico, 69, Italian politician, deputy (2006–2013, 2015–2018).
- Luis Villafuerte, 86, Filipino politician, minister of trade (1979–1981), governor of Camarines Sur (1986–1992, 1995–2004) and deputy (2004–2013).
- Yevgeny Zinichev, 55, Russian politician and military and intelligence officer, minister of emergency situations (since 2018), fall.

=== 9 ===
- Borhane Alaouié, 80, Lebanese film director (Kafr kasem, Beyroutou el lika, Khalass).
- Marianne Battani, 77, American jurist, judge of the U.S. District Court for Eastern Michigan (since 2000), cancer.
- Urbain Braems, 87, Belgian football player (Club Brugge) and manager (Anderlecht, Trabzonspor).
- Sir Timothy Colman, 91, British businessman, Lord Lieutenant of Norfolk (1978–2004).
- Narvel J. Crawford, 91, American politician.
- Marian Duś, 83, Polish Roman Catholic prelate, auxiliary bishop of Warsaw (1986–2013).
- Caspar Einem, 73, Austrian politician, minister of the interior (1995–1997) and science, traffic and the arts (1997–2000), member of the National Council (2000–2007).
- Harold Franklin, 88, American lecturer.
- Wiesław Gołas, 90, Polish actor (Dzięcioł, Czterdziestolatek, The Deluge).
- Jon Gregory, 77, British film editor (Four Weddings and a Funeral, Secrets & Lies, Three Billboards Outside Ebbing, Missouri).
- Magda Harout, 95, American actress (The Nanny, Transylvania Twist).
- Jean-Claude van Itallie, 85, Belgian-born American playwright (America Hurrah), pneumonia.
- Alicia Iturrioz, 94, Spanish painter and author.
- Jean-Paul Jeannotte, 95, Canadian operatic tenor and artistic director (Opéra de Montréal).
- Elizabeth Ireland McCann, 90, American theatre producer (Amadeus, The Elephant Man, A View from the Bridge), nine-time Tony winner.
- Bruce McFee, 60, Scottish politician, MSP (2003–2007), complications from a stroke.
- Richard McGeagh, 77, American water polo player and Olympic swimmer (1964), COVID-19.
- Lucette Michaux-Chevry, 92, Guadeloupean politician, deputy (1988–1993) and senator (1995–2011) of France.
- Leif Frode Onarheim, 87, Norwegian businessman and politician, MP (2001–2005).
- Tarcísio Padilha, 93, Brazilian philosopher, COVID-19.
- Hans Pfann, 100, German Olympic gymnast (1952, 1956).
- Danilo Popivoda, 74, Slovenian football player (Olimpija, Eintracht Braunschweig, Yugoslavia national team) and manager.
- Ferry Radax, 89, Austrian filmmaker.
- Helm Stierlin, 95, German psychiatrist.
- Albert Kakou Tiapani, 77, Ivorian politician, minister of housing and urban planning (1998–1999).
- Trilochan Singh Wazir, 67, Indian politician, Jammu and Kashmir MLC. (body discovered on this date)
- Rahimullah Yusufzai, 66, Pakistani journalist (Time, BBC), cancer.

=== 10 ===
- Charles Konan Banny, 78, Ivorian politician, prime minister (2005–2007), COVID-19.
- Denys Barvinko, 27, Ukrainian footballer (Metalist Kharkiv).
- Ben Best, 46, American screenwriter (Eastbound & Down) and actor (Superbad, Land of the Lost).
- Les Bettinson, 86, English rugby league player (Salford, Cumberland).
- Donald A. Bonner, 86, American politician.
- Mike Boyle, 77, American politician, mayor of Omaha, Nebraska (1981–1987), pneumonia.
- Manuel Calvo Fernández, 79, Spanish boxer.
- Michael Chapman, 80, English singer-songwriter and guitarist (True North).
- Jack Egers, 72, Canadian ice hockey player (New York Rangers, St. Louis Blues, Washington Capitals), pulmonary fibrosis.
- Allan Egolf, 83, American politician, member of the Pennsylvania House of Representatives (1993–2004).
- Stephen H. Grimes, 93, American jurist, justice of the Supreme Court of Florida (1987–1996).
- Chet Hanulak, 88, American football player (Cleveland Browns).
- Michael Hoey, 73, British linguist.
- Roger Kangni, 77, Togolese Olympic middle-distance runner (1972).
- Bulaimu Muwanga Kibirige, 67, Ugandan hotel executive.
- Gene Littles, 78, American basketball player (Carolina Cougars) and coach (Cleveland Cavaliers, Charlotte Hornets).
- Luigi Napoleoni, 84, Italian Olympic boxer.
- Raymond E. Peet, 100, American vice admiral, commander of the First Fleet (1970–1972).
- Concepción Ramírez, 79, Guatemalan Tzʼutujil peace activist.
- Jorge Sampaio, 81, Portuguese lawyer and politician, president (1996–2006), mayor of Lisbon (1990–1995) and high-representative for the Alliance of Civilizations (2007–2013), respiratory failure.
- Dalal bint Saud Al Saud, 63–64, Saudi royal and philanthropist, cancer.
- Lars-Henrik Schmidt, 68, Danish philosopher and educator.
- Nadir Shah, 57, Bangladeshi cricket umpire, cancer.
- Jón Sigurðsson, 75, Icelandic politician, minister of industry and commerce (2006–2007) and governor of the Central Bank of Iceland (2003–2006), prostate cancer.
- Byther Smith, 89, American blues musician.
- Gordon Spice, 81, British racing driver and car constructor (Spice Engineering), cancer.
- Erika Strößenreuther, 83, German Olympic javelin thrower (1960).
- Syntar Klas Sunn, 62, Indian politician, Meghalaya MLA (since 2018), COVID-19.
- Oscar Velasquez, 77, American artist.
- Saadi Yacef, 93, Algerian independence fighter and actor (The Battle of Algiers).
- Duygun Yarsuvat, 84, Turkish lawyer and football executive, chairman of Galatasaray (2014–2015).
- André Zacharow, 82, Brazilian politician, economist, and lawyer, deputy (2003–2015), COVID-19.

=== 11 ===
- Minna Aaltonen, 54, Finnish actress (London's Burning, Lexx) and television host (Gladiaattorit), complications from surgery.
- Carlo Alighiero, 94, Italian actor (The Strange Vice of Mrs. Wardh, The Violent Professionals, Silent Action) and voice actor.
- Joan Berger, 87, American baseball player (Rockford Peaches).
- Ruth Cameron, 74, Canadian-born American jazz singer and record producer.
- Shoshanna Evers, 41, American author, complications from heart failure.
- Mick Flannelly, 91, Irish hurler (Waterford, Mount Sion).
- William Dunavant, 88, American businessman.
- Abimael Guzmán, 86, Peruvian Maoist leader and convicted terrorist, founder of Shining Path.
- Audrey Haine, 94, American baseball player (Fort Wayne Daisies, Grand Rapids Chicks, Peoria Redwings).
- Aziz Hajini, 64, Indian poet and writer.
- Tommy Hazouri, 76, American politician, member of the Florida House of Representatives (1974–1986) and mayor of Jacksonville (1987–1991), lung disease.
- Vilma Hollingbery, 89, British character actress.
- Stephan Koranyi, 64, German philologist, lecturer, and editor.
- Nikolai Kozyrev, 87, Russian diplomat, Soviet and Russian ambassador to Ireland (1991–1998).
- Giulia Daneo Lorimer, 89, Italian violinist and singer.
- María Mendiola, 69, Spanish singer (Baccara).
- Antonio Montilla, 85, Venezuelan Olympic cyclist (1956).
- Radmilo Pavlović, 40, Serbian footballer, (Trayal Kruševac, Napredak Kruševac).
- Roger Sénié, 101, French politician, mayor of La Bastide-de-Bousignac (1947–2014).
- Catherine Sheldrick Ross, 75, Canadian academic, bile duct cancer.
- Simon Shnoll, 91, Russian biophysicist and science historian.
- Terence Smith, 88, British sailor, Olympic bronze medalist (1956).
- Gerald Stone, 89, British linguist and literary scholar.
- Kerry Teague, 60, American racing driver.
- Phùng Quang Thanh, 72, Vietnamese military officer and politician, chief of the general staff of the Army (2001–2006) and minister of defence (2006–2016).
- Mick Tingelhoff, 81, American Hall of Fame football player (Minnesota Vikings).
- Nicolás Villamil, 56, Argentine footballer (Racing Club, Fernández Vial, Concepción), heart attack.
- Gloria Warren, 95, American actress (Dangerous Money, Cinderella Swings It, Bells of San Fernando) and singer.

=== 12 ===
- Kristin Kuhns Alexandre, 73, American screenwriter (Dead Reckoning).
- Fran Bennett, 84, American actress (Nightingales, Sunset Beach, Wes Craven's New Nightmare).
- Bernardino Cano Radil, 65, Paraguayan politician and diplomat, deputy (1989–1998) and ambassador to Cuba (since 2015), COVID-19.
- Carlo Chendi, 88, Italian cartoonist.
- Marc Clark, 97, British-born Australian sculptor and printmaker.
- Thom van Dijck, 92, Dutch Olympic field hockey player (1960).
- Jack D. Dunitz, 98, Scottish chemist.
- Bob Enyart, 62, American talk radio host and pastor, COVID-19.
- Clive Finkelstein, 80s, Australian computer scientist.
- Guang Gao, 76, Chinese computer scientist.
- Andreas Herczog, 74, Hungarian-born Swiss politician, national councillor (1979–1999), COVID-19.
- Sondra James, 82, American sound designer (Sex and the City, Royal Pains) and actress (Joker), lung cancer.
- Djohari Kahar, 89, Indonesian politician, MP (1987–1992).
- Russ Kick, 52, American writer, editor and publisher.
- Michel Maïque, 73, French rugby league player (Lézignan, national team) and politician, mayor of Lézignan-Corbières (2014–2020), pancreatitis.
- Wendell Wise Mayes Jr., 97, American radio and cable television executive.
- Nicolás Naranjo, 31, Argentine road racing cyclist, traffic collision.
- Richard P. Nathan, 85, American writer.
- Joachim Rother, 73, German Olympic swimmer.
- James Snyder Jr., 76, American author, attorney and politician, member of the North Carolina House of Representatives (1969–1973).
- John Shelby Spong, 90, American Episcopal prelate, bishop of Newark (1979–2000).
- Bruce Spraggins, 82, American basketball player (Philadelphia Tapers, New Jersey Americans).
- Fabio Taborre, 36, Italian road racing cyclist.
- Giannis Theonas, 81, Greek politician, MEP (1994–2001).
- Gunnar Utterberg, 78, Swedish sprint canoer, Olympic champion (1964).
- Antonio Verini, 85, Italian politician, deputy (2006), complications from surgery.
- William G. Wagner, 71, American historian.
- Owain Williams, 56, Welsh rugby union player (Glamorgan Wanderers, national team), cancer.

=== 13 ===
- Masuda M Rashid Chowdhury, 70, Bangladeshi politician, MP (since 2019).
- Ruly Carpenter, 81, American baseball executive, president of the Philadelphia Phillies (1972–1981).
- Reg Chrimes, 96, British politician.
- Don Collier, 92, American actor (Outlaws, The High Chaparral, The Young Riders), lung cancer.
- Oscar Fernandes, 80, Indian politician, MP (1980–1996, since 1998) and minister of road transport and highways (2013–2014), complications from a fall.
- Bob Faehn, 63, American politician, member of the South Dakota House of Representatives (2005–2011), cancer.
- Olivier Giscard d'Estaing, 93, French politician, deputy (1968–1973) and co-founder of INSEAD.
- Rafiq Hajat, 65, Malawian civil rights activist, heart attack.
- Parys Haralson, 37, American football player (Tennessee Volunteers, San Francisco 49ers, New Orleans Saints), stroke.
- Antony Hewish, 97, British radio astronomer, Nobel Prize laureate (1974).
- Charlotte Johnson Wahl, 79, British painter, complications from Parkinson's disease.
- Borisav Jović, 92, Serbian politician, president of the Presidency of Yugoslavia (1990–1991) and secretary general of the Non-Aligned Movement (1990–1991), COVID-19.
- Leroy Lewis, 76, Costa Rican football player (Limonense, Uruguay de Coronado) and coach (Belize national team), prostate cancer.
- Andrey Makeyev, 69, Russian basketball player, Olympic bronze medalist (1976).
- Baruch Nachshon, 82, Israeli artist.
- Kathleen Partridge, 57, Australian field hockey player, Olympic champion (1988).
- Fern Perrault, 94, Canadian ice hockey player (New York Rangers).
- Margaret Purves, 86, British nurse, recipient of the Albert Medal for Lifesaving.
- Ruben Reyes, 82, Filipino jurist, associate justice of the Supreme Court (2007–2009).
- Rizabawa, 54, Indian actor (In Harihar Nagar, Vakkeel Vasudev, Malappuram Haji Mahanaya Joji), kidney failure.
- Fred Stanfield, 77, Canadian ice hockey player (Chicago Blackhawks, Boston Bruins, Buffalo Sabres).
- Thommayanti, 85, Thai novelist (Thawiphop, Khu Kam).
- Amédée Turner, 92, British politician, MEP (1979–1994).
- Colin Urquhart, 81, British neocharismatic preacher, cancer.
- Tom Vraalsen, 85, Norwegian politician and diplomat, minister of international development (1989–1990), ambassador to the UK (1994–1996) and the US (1996–2001).
- George Wein, 95, American festival promoter and jazz pianist, founder of the Newport Jazz Festival, Newport Folk Festival, and New Orleans Jazz & Heritage Festival.
- Earl P. Yates, 97, American navy rear admiral.

=== 14 ===
- Joseba Arregui Aramburu, 75, Spanish theologian, academic and politician, member of the Basque Parliament (1999–2001).
- Zaitoon Bano, 83, Pakistani feminist writer, poet and broadcaster.
- Ansis Bērziņš, 81, Latvian film director and producer (Fantadroms).
- Irene Brietzke, 76, Brazilian actress (Doce de Mãe, Antes Que o Mundo Acabe, Seashore).
- Caressing, 23, American racehorse and broodmare, complications from laminitis.
- David Yonggi Cho, 85, South Korean Christian minister and convicted embezzler, co-founder of Yoido Full Gospel Church, complications from a stroke.
- Rob Duhamel, 66, Jersey politician, member of the States Assembly (1993–2014) and minister of planning and environment (2011–2014).
- George Ferencz, 74, American theatre director.
- Ralph Grasso, 87, American guitarist, complications following heart surgery.
- James G. Howes, 75, American businessman, heart attack.
- Dave Jenks, 79, American author and real estate mogul.
- Viktor Kazantsev, 75, Russian military officer, envoy to the Southern Federal District (2000–2004).
- Reuben Klamer, 99, American board game inventor (The Game of Life).
- Cees Koch, 85, Dutch Olympic shot putter and discus thrower (1960, 1964).
- Hubert de Lapparent, 102, French actor.
- Fjodor Lishajko, 89, Ukrainian-born Swedish biochemist.
- Ladislav Lubina, 54, Czech ice hockey player (HC Pardubice, HC Dukla Jihlava, HC Oceláři Třinec), Olympic bronze medallist (1992), brain cancer.
- Lung Shao-hua, 68, Taiwanese actor (10,000 Miles, March of Happiness) and television host (Guess).
- Norm Macdonald, 61, Canadian comedian, actor, and screenwriter (Saturday Night Live, The Norm Show, Dirty Work), leukemia.
- Catherine Machado, 85, American Olympic figure skater.
- Antonio Martínez Sarrión, 82, Spanish poet and translator, heart attack.
- Ela Nikbayan, 40, Iranian transgender woman
- Ida Nudel, 90, Russian-Israeli civil rights activist.
- Guillermo Ortiz Mondragón, 74, Mexican Roman Catholic prelate, bishop of Cuautitlán (since 2005).
- János Pintér, 84, Hungarian Olympic long-distance runner.
- Józef Polonek, 72, Polish footballer (Wisła Kraków, Garbarnia Kraków).
- Yuriy Sedykh, 66, Ukrainian hammer thrower, Olympic champion (1976, 1980).
- Vicente Zarzo Pitarch, 83, Spanish horn player and writer.

=== 15 ===
- Philippe Adrien, 81, French actor (Green Harvest) and playwright.
- Lou Angotti, 83, Canadian ice hockey player (Chicago Blackhawks, New York Rangers, St. Louis Blues) and coach.
- Fazlul Haque Aspia, 85, Bangladeshi politician, MP (1996–2001), dengue virus.
- Norman Bailey, 88, British-born American opera singer.
- Stephen J. Bonner Jr., 103, American World War II flying ace.
- Alastair Brindle, 82, English rugby league player (Warrington).
- Fernando Mario Chávez Ruvalcaba, 88, Mexican Roman Catholic prelate, bishop of Zacatecas (1999–2008), COVID-19.
- Shaaron Claridge, 82, American police radio dispatcher and voice actress (Adam-12).
- Carl DePasqua, 93, American college football player (Pittsburgh Panthers) and coach (Waynesburg Yellow Jackets).
- Leta Powell Drake, 83, American broadcaster and television executive (KOLN).
- Ephraim Einhorn, 103, Austrian-born British Orthodox rabbi.
- Robert Fyfe, 90, Scottish actor (Last of the Summer Wine, Around the World in 80 Days, Cloud Atlas), kidney disease.
- Leonard Gibbs, 73, American percussionist, prostate cancer.
- Elinor Miller Greenberg, 88, American author.
- Penny Harrington, 79, American police officer.
- Satoshi Hirayama, 91, American baseball player (Hiroshima Carp).
- Justín Javorek, 85, Slovak football player (Inter Bratislava, Czechoslovakia national team) and manager (Tatran Prešov).
- Žana Lelas, 51, Croatian basketball player, Olympic silver medalist (1988).
- Enrique Lucca, 97, Venezuelan Olympic sport shooter.
- Mary Mahoney, 81, Australian physician.
- Marthe Mercadier, 92, French actress (Three Telegrams, The Night Is My Kingdom, Rendezvous in Grenada).
- Frank Mitchell, 95, Canadian politician, British Columbia MLA (1951–1952, 1979–1986).
- W. Tayloe Murphy Jr., 88, American politician, member of the Virginia House of Delegates (1982–2000) and Virginia secretary of natural resources (2002–2006).
- Gavan O'Herlihy, 70, Irish-born American actor (Never Say Never Again, Willow, Happy Days).
- Doris Piserchia, 92, American science fiction writer.
- Joel Rapp, 87, American film director and television writer (High School Big Shot, McHale's Navy, Gilligan's Island).
- Ronald Roose, 75, American film editor (Star Trek VI: The Undiscovered Country, Hoffa) and screenwriter (Collateral Damage), Parkinson's disease.
- Thomas Ryan, 91, Irish artist and designer.
- Bill Sudakis, 75, American baseball player (Los Angeles Dodgers, Texas Rangers, New York Yankees).
- Dany Toussaint, 64, Haitian military officer and politician, senator.

=== 16 ===
- Sir Silas Atopare, 70, Papua New Guinean politician, governor-general (1997–2004).
- Vilborg Dagbjartsdóttir, 91, Icelandic writer.
- Boet van Dulmen, 73, Dutch motorcycle road racer, traffic collision.
- Charlie Evans, 79, Australian rules footballer (Footscray, South Melbourne).
- Sverre Fornes, 89, Norwegian footballer (Rosenborg).
- Alan Fox, 85, Welsh footballer (Wrexham, Hartlepool United, Bradford City).
- Dušan Ivković, 77, Serbian Hall of Fame basketball player and coach (Partizan, Olympiacos, Yugoslavia national team), pulmonary edema.
- Geir Johnson, 68, Norwegian composer and writer.
- Kohwe, 75, Ghanaian actor and comedian, complications from a stroke.
- Hicham El-Mashtoub, 49, Lebanese-born Canadian football player (Houston Oilers, Edmonton Eskimos), cancer.
- František Maxa, 98, Czech Olympic sport shooter (1952, 1956).
- Peter C. McCarthy, 80, American politician.
- Hlengiwe Mkhize, 69, South African politician, MP (since 2009), minister of home affairs (2017) and higher education (2017–2018).
- George Mraz, 77, Czech-born American jazz musician (Quest, New York Jazz Quartet, The Thad Jones/Mel Lewis Orchestra).
- Casimir Oyé-Mba, 79, Gabonese politician, prime minister (1990–1994), COVID-19.
- Margarita Ponomaryova, 58, Russian Olympic hurdler (1992).
- Jane Powell, 92, American actress (A Date with Judy, Seven Brides for Seven Brothers, Royal Wedding), singer and dancer.
- Juli Reding, 85, American actress (Tormented).
- Steve Riley, 68, American football player (Minnesota Vikings).
- John Ruggie, 76, American political scientist.
- Graciete Santana, 40, Brazilian Olympic long-distance runner (2016), melanoma.
- Sir Clive Sinclair, 81, English entrepreneur and inventor, founder of Sinclair Radionics, Sinclair Research and Sinclair Vehicles.
- David Stenshoel, 71, American musician (Boiled in Lead)
- Ruth C. Sullivan, 97, American autism advocate.
- David Sweeney, 61, American-born Canadian Olympic sailor (1984, 1988, 1992).
- Tim Thorne, 77, Australian poet.
- Alexandra Vydrina, 33, Russian linguist (Kakabe language).

=== 17 ===
- Angela Ballara, 77, New Zealand historian.
- Abdelaziz Bouteflika, 84, Algerian politician, president (1999–2019), minister of foreign affairs (1963–1979) and president of the U.N. General Assembly (1974–1975), cardiac arrest.
- Ted E. Brewerton, 96, Canadian-born American missionary, general authority of the Church of Jesus Christ of Latter-day Saints (since 1978).
- Roger Brown, 84, American Hall of Fame football player (Maryland State Hawks, Detroit Lions, Los Angeles Rams).
- Rafael Consuegra, 80, Cuban sculptor.
- Jonathan Cooper, 58, British barrister and human rights activist, co-founder of the Human Dignity Trust.
- Russ Dallen, 58, American economist.
- Dottie Dodgion, 91, American drummer and singer, complications from a stroke.
- Tim Donnelly, 77, American actor (Emergency!, The Secret of Santa Vittoria, The Toolbox Murders).
- Patricia DuBose Duncan, 89, American artist.
- Avril Elgar, 89, English actress (Spring and Port Wine, The Medusa Touch, George and Mildred).
- Carlos Gianelli, 73, Uruguayan lawyer and diplomat, ambassador to the United States (2005–2012, 2015–2020), heart attack.
- Basil Hoffman, 83, American actor (The Artist, Hill Street Blues, Santa Barbara).
- Kemal Kurspahić, 74, Bosnian journalist (Oslobođenje) and diplomat.
- Albert Linder, 25, Kazakhstani weightlifter.
- Murtaza Lodhgar, 45, Indian cricketer (Bengal), heart attack.
- Alban Lynch, 91, Australian mining engineer.
- Alfred Miodowicz, 92, Polish trade unionist and politician, deputy (1985–1989).
- Barry Norsworthy, 69, Australian footballer (Melbourne).
- Constantin Olteanu, 75, Romanian footballer (Argeș Pitești), Olympic team (1972).
- Thanu Padmanabhan, 64, Indian theoretical physicist, heart attack.
- Ronald Paris, 88, German painter and graphic artist.
- Alfonso Sastre, 95, Spanish playwright, essayist, and critic.
- Tony Scott, 80, English footballer (West Ham United, Aston Villa, Torquay United).
- J. V. Smith, 95, English rugby union player (Cambridge University, national team).
- Minja Subota, 82, Serbian television host.
- Wataru Takeshita, 74, Japanese politician, member of the House of Representatives (since 2000), esophageal cancer.
- Michał Turkiewicz, 64, Polish politician and teacher, deputy (2001–2005).

=== 18 ===
- Julos Beaucarne, 85, Belgian singer, writer and actor (The Mystery of the Yellow Room).
- Jean-Patrice Brosse, 71, French harpsichordist and organist.
- Mario Camus, 86, Spanish film director and screenwriter (La colmena, The Holy Innocents, The House of Bernarda Alba).
- Anna Chromý, 81, Czech painter and sculptor.
- Iris Davis, 71, American Olympic sprinter (1972).
- Leo De Lyon, 95, American actor (Top Cat).
- Aquilino Duque, 90, Spanish poet and writer.
- Anto Finnegan, 48, Northern Irish Gaelic footballer (Antrim), motor neurone disease.
- José-Augusto França, 98, Portuguese historian, art critic and professor.
- Ali Kalora, 40, Indonesian Islamic militant, leader of the East Indonesia Mujahideen (since 2016), shot.
- Jolidee Matongo, 46, South African politician, mayor of Johannesburg (since 2021), traffic collision.
- Neil McCarthy, 81, American college basketball coach (Weber State Wildcats, New Mexico State Aggies).
- Mick McGinty, 68, American artist (Street Fighter II), lung cancer.
- Fakhreddin Mousavi, 90–91, Iranian judge and politician, three-time MP and member of the Assembly of Experts (since 2016).
- Soni Oyekan, 75, Nigerian-born American chemical engineer and inventor.
- Albert J. Raboteau, 78, American religion scholar, dean of Princeton University Graduate School (1992–1993).
- Gudmund Restad, 83, Norwegian politician, MP (1985–2001) and minister of finance (1997–2000).
- Christoph Schwöbel, 66, German theologian.
- Charles Scot-Brown, 98, Canadian World War II veteran, Legion of Honour recipient.
- Kumiko Serizawa, 92, Japanese-American dollmaker.
- Chris Anker Sørensen, 37, Danish road racing cyclist, traffic collision.
- Kristoffer Stensrud, 67, Norwegian investor.

=== 19 ===
- Godil Prasad Anuragi, 92, Indian politician, MP (1980–1984).
- Ama Benyiwa-Doe, 71, Ghanaian politician, MP (1992–2004).
- Françoise Bernard, 100, French gastronomic author and television presenter.
- James Bilbray, 83, American politician and postal executive, member of the U.S. House of Representatives (1987–1995) and chairman of the Board of Governors of the USPS (2014–2016).
- Richard Buckley, 72, American journalist and writer.
- Sylvano Bussotti, 89, Italian composer, poet, and artistic director (La Fenice, Festival Puccini).
- John Carroll, 91, American lawyer and politician, member of the Hawaii House of Representatives (1971–1979) and Senate (1979–1981).
- John Challis, 79, English actor (Only Fools and Horses, The Green Green Grass, Benidorm) and comedian, cancer.
- Cheung Yan-lung, 99, Hong Kong businessman and politician, member of the Legislative Council (1981–1991), chairman of the Regional Council (1986–1991) and the HYK (1964–1966).
- Stephen Critchlow, 54, British actor (The Infinite Worlds of H. G. Wells, Kenneth Williams: Fantabulosa!, Star Wars: The Old Republic).
- Steve Davisson, 63, American politician, member of the Indiana House of Representatives (since 2010), cancer.
- Nilay Dutta, 68, Indian lawyer, cricket administrator, and umpire.
- Dame Jocelyn Fish, 90, New Zealand women's rights advocate.
- Terry Garland, 68, American blues guitarist and songwriter.
- Jimmy Greaves, 81, English Hall of Fame footballer (Chelsea, Tottenham Hotspur, national team), world champion (1966).
- Richard Lachmann, 65, American sociologist.
- András Ligeti, 68, Hungarian violinist and conductor.
- Terry Long, 86, English football player (Crystal Palace) and coach.
- Luis Gustavo, 87, Brazilian actor (Beto Rockfeller, Elas por Elas, Sai de Baixo), cancer.
- Obadiah Mailafia, 64, Nigerian economist and politician, deputy governor of the Central Bank of Nigeria (2005–2007).
- Joan Martínez Vilaseca, 78, Spanish football player (Espanyol, Levante) and manager.
- Ole Nordhaug, 96, Norwegian Lutheran clergyman, bishop of Møre (1983–1991).
- Mats Paulson, 83, Swedish singer-songwriter ("Barfotavisan", "Visa vid vindens ängar") and painter.
- Morris Perry, 96, English actor (Nothing but the Night, The Avengers, Z-Cars).
- Gabby Petito, 22, American vandweller, homicide. (body discovered on this date)
- Michèle Pialat, 79, French Olympic swimmer.
- Jim Preuitt, 86, American politician.
- Ronald F. Probstein, 93, American engineer.
- Tomáš Prokop, 27, Czech ice hockey player (Mountfield HK, Motor České Budějovice, Draci Šumperk).
- María del Carmen Rovira Gaspar, 98, Spanish historian, researcher and academic.
- Allan Slaight, 90, Canadian magician, media mogul, and philanthropist.
- Dinky Soliman, 68, Filipino politician, secretary of social welfare and development (2001–2005, 2010–2016), complications from kidney and heart failure.
- Willie Spencer, 68, American football player (New York Giants, Minnesota Vikings).
- Marina Tucaković, 67, Serbian lyricist ("Ovo je Balkan", "Nije ljubav stvar", "Ljubav je svuda"), complications from cancer and COVID-19.
- Charles Vardis, 35, Ghanaian footballer (Accra Hearts of Oak, New Edubiase United, Maccabi Herzliya).
- Petter Vennerød, 72, Norwegian film director (Lasse & Geir, Drømmeslottet, Bryllupsfesten).
- Liam Walsh, 23, English rugby league player (Widnes Vikings), traffic collision.
- Max Wiltshire, 83, Welsh rugby union player (Aberavon RFC, Barbarian, national team).

=== 20 ===
- Colin Bailey, 87, English-born American jazz drummer, post-COVID-19 pneumonia.
- Sherwood Boehlert, 84, American politician, member of the U.S. House of Representatives (1983–2007) and chair of the House Science Committee (2001–2007).
- Cloyd Boyer, 94, American baseball player (St. Louis Cardinals).
- Peter Bunnell, 83, American author, scholar and photography historian.
- Angelo Codevilla, 78, Italian-born American international relations scholar, traffic collision.
- Sarah Dash, 76, American singer (Labelle).
- Jackie De Caluwé, 87, Belgian footballer (Cercle Brugge).
- Robert Deyber, 66, American painter, suicide.
- Guy Friedrich, 93, French footballer (Angers SCO, CO Roubaix-Tourcoing).
- Chauncey Howell, 86, American journalist (Women's Wear Daily, The New York Times, WNBC).
- Willy Holzmüller, 90, German footballer (SC Motor Karl-Marx-Stadt, East Germany national team).
- Roland Jaccard, 79, Swiss writer, journalist and literary critic, suicide by barbiturate overdose.
- Jan Jindra, 89, Czech rower, Olympic champion (1952).
- Aloys Jousten, 83, Belgian Roman Catholic prelate, bishop of Liège (2001–2013).
- Vidyadhar Karmakar, 96, Indian actor (Karthik Calling Karthik, Ek Thi Daayan, Veerey Ki Wedding).
- Claude Lombard, 76, Belgian singer ("Quand tu reviendras").
- Keith Macdonald, 88, Scottish rugby union player (Barbarians, national team).
- Billy Maxwell, 92, American golfer (PGA Tour, Champions Tour), U.S. Amateur winner (1951).
- Charles W. Mills, 70, Jamaican philosopher.
- Rosemary Mitchell, 54, British historian, cancer.
- Mat Noh, 67, Singaporean footballer (national team).
- Helmut Oberlander, 97, Ukrainian-born Canadian World War II soldier, member of the Einsatzgruppen.
- Raymond Reaux, 80, French Olympic cyclist.
- Marcia H. Rioux, 74, Canadian legal scholar.
- Dean Shek, 72, Hong Kong film actor and producer.
- Yudhvir Singh Judev, 39, Indian politician, Chhattisgarh MLA (2008–2018).
- Henry Stelling, 97, American Army major general.
- Pavel Țugui, 99, Romanian political activist and literary historian.
- Jim Van Engelenhoven, 78, American politician, member of the Iowa House of Representatives (1999–2012).
- John Vermillion, 99, American politician.
- John H. Walter, 93, American mathematician.
- Hans Wagener, 90, Dutch Olympic field hockey player.
- Ken Worden, 78, English football player (Hobart Juventus) and manager (F.A. Selangor, Malaysia national team).

=== 21 ===
- Aharon Abuhatzira, 82, Israeli politician and convicted fraudster, member of the Knesset (1977–1992), minister of religions (1977–1981) and labor (1981–1982).
- Kurt Boese, 91, German-born Canadian Olympic wrestler (1960).
- Enea Cerquetti, 83, Italian politician, mayor of Cinisello Balsamo (1970–1979) and of Cusano Milanino (1990–1994).
- Dallas Dempster, 80, Australian property developer (Burswood Resort and Casino), traffic collision.
- Constance van Eeden, 94, Dutch mathematical statistician.
- Romano Fogli, 83, Italian football player (Bologna, Milan, national team) and manager.
- Marcia Freedman, 83, American-Israeli peace activist, MK (1974–1977).
- Willie Garson, 57, American actor (Sex and the City, White Collar, John from Cincinnati), pancreatic cancer.
- Rae German, 80, Canadian football player (Hamilton Tiger-Cats).
- Marilyn Golden, 67, American disability advocate.
- Al Harrington, 85, Samoan-American actor (Hawaii Five-O), stroke.
- Rumi Kazama, 55, Japanese professional wrestler (DDT, JWP), promoter (LLPW) and kickboxer.
- Sir Maurice King, 85, Barbadian lawyer and politician, minister of foreign affairs, foreign trade and international business (1989–1993).
- Richard H. Kirk, 65, English electronic musician (Cabaret Voltaire, Sweet Exorcist) and songwriter ("Yashar").
- Leo Koceski, 92, American football player (Michigan Wolverines).
- La Prieta Linda, 88, Mexican singer and actress (Valente Quintero).
- Joan Howard Maurer, 94, American writer and actress (Swing Your Lady, Love in a Bungalow).
- John Brendan McCormack, 86, American Roman Catholic prelate, bishop of Manchester (1998–2011).
- Jack Minore, 82, American politician, member of the Michigan House of Representatives (1999–2004).
- Violet Oaklander, 94, American psychotherapist.
- Janet G. Osteryoung, 82, American chemist.
- Peter Palmer, 90, American actor (Li'l Abner, Custer).
- George R. Pettit, 92, American chemist.
- Anthony Pilla, 88, American Roman Catholic prelate, auxiliary bishop (1979–1980) and bishop (1980–2006) of Cleveland.
- Frank Pratt, 79, American politician, member of the Arizona House of Representatives (2009–2017, since 2021) and Senate (2017–2021).
- Carlos Ramos Núñez, 61, Peruvian jurist and academic, justice of the Constitutional Court (since 2014), cardiac arrest.
- Gwyn Singleton, 87, Scottish medical researcher.
- Mohamed Hussein Tantawi, 85, Egyptian field marshal and politician, chairman of the Supreme Council of the Armed Forces and de facto head of state (2011–2012) and minister of defense (1991–2012).
- Melvin Van Peebles, 89, American film director, actor and playwright (Sweet Sweetback's Baadasssss Song, Posse, Ain't Supposed to Die a Natural Death).
- Günter Wienhold, 73, German Olympic footballer (1972).

=== 22 ===
- Eric Alfasi, 49, Israeli basketball player (Maccabi Netanya) and coach (Maccabi Ashdod, Hapoel Eilat), COVID-19.
- Dawn Pawson Bean, 94, American synchronized swimmer.
- Pieter Beelaerts van Blokland, 88, Dutch politician, deputy (1981), mayor of Amstelveen (1971–1977) and Hengelo (1981–1985, 1999–2000).
- Abdelkader Bensalah, 79, Algerian politician, acting head of state (2019), president of the Transitional Council/People's Assembly (1994–2002) and the Council of the Nation (2002–2019), cancer complicated by COVID-19.
- Odile Caradec, 96, French poet.
- Tom Carroll, 85, American baseball player (New York Yankees, Kansas City Athletics).
- Magi Dodd, 44, Welsh radio broadcaster (BBC Radio Cymru).
- Huang Hongjia, 97, Chinese physicist, member of the Chinese Academy of Sciences.
- Axel Gehrke, 79, German politician, MP (since 2017).
- Lois Horton, 78, American historian, stroke.
- Peter Howitt, 93, English set decorator (Who Framed Roger Rabbit, Elizabeth, Braveheart).
- Manuel Ibarburu, 84, Spanish Olympic rower.
- Tari Ito, 70, Japanese performance artist, complications from amyotrophic lateral sclerosis.
- Colin Jones, 85, English photographer and ballet dancer, COVID-19.
- Doğan Kuban, 95, Turkish architectural historian.
- Laura Marcus, 65, British literature scholar, pancreatic cancer.
- Orlando Martínez, 77, Cuban boxer, Olympic champion (1972).
- Roger Michell, 65, South African-born British film director (Notting Hill, Venus, My Cousin Rachel).
- Bob Moore, 88, American Hall of Fame session bassist (The Nashville A-Team) and orchestra leader.
- Nenad Nenadović, 56, Serbian actor and television host, COVID-19.
- Ulf Nilsson, 73, Swedish children's author.
- Mike Overy, 70, American baseball player (California Angels).
- Jim Pehler, 79, American politician, member of the Minnesota House of Representatives (1973–1980) and Senate (1981–1990).
- Floyd Sagely, 89, American football player (San Francisco 49ers, Chicago Cardinals).
- Jay Sandrich, 89, American Hall of Fame television director (The Mary Tyler Moore Show, The Cosby Show, Soap), 4-time Emmy winner.
- Gil C. Silva, 78, American politician, member of the Hawaii House of Representatives (1943–2021).
- Jan Stanienda, 68, Polish violinist and conductor.
- Jüri Tamm, 64, Estonian politician and hammer thrower, Olympic bronze medalist (1980, 1988), MP (1999–2011).
- André Vauchez, 82, French politician, mayor of Tavaux (1977–2001) and deputy (1997–2002).
- Eliyantha White, 48, Sri Lankan spiritual healer, COVID-19.

=== 23 ===
- Kjell Askildsen, 91, Norwegian writer.
- Pål Benum, 86, Norwegian Olympic runner (1964).
- Jules Chametzky, 93, American literary critic and writer.
- David H. DePatie, 91, American film and television producer (The Pink Panther), co-founder of DePatie–Freleng Enterprises.
- Andy Douglas, 89, American jurist, justice of the Supreme Court of Ohio (1985–2002), pulmonary fibrosis.
- John Elliott, 79, Australian businessman, president of the Carlton Football Club (1983–2002), complications from a fall.
- Pee Wee Ellis, 80, American saxophonist, composer and arranger.
- Taito Phillip Field, 68, Samoan-born New Zealand politician, MP (1993–2008).
- Bruce Fleisher, 72, American golfer (PGA Tour, Champions Tour), U.S. Amateur winner (1968), cancer.
- Edward Janiak, 69, Polish Roman Catholic prelate, auxiliary bishop of Wrocław (1996–2012) and bishop of Kalisz (2012–2020), lung cancer.
- Natalie Meyer, 91, American politician, secretary of state of Colorado (1983–1995).
- Daniel Mio, 80, French teacher and politician, mayor of Rieulay (1977–2006).
- John Mitchell, 80, New Zealand historian.
- Hans Nordin, 90, Swedish Olympic ski jumper (1952).
- Billa O'Connell, 91, Irish pantomimer.
- Jan Piecyk, 81, Polish footballer (GKS Katowice). (death announced on this date)
- Gholamali Raisozzakerin, 82, Iranian anthropologist, poet, and singer.
- Sharad Ranpise, 70, Indian politician, Maharashtra MLC (since 2018).
- Roberto Roena, 81, Puerto Rican salsa percussionist, orchestra leader, and dancer.
- Charles Grier Sellers, 98, American historian.
- Gerald Sveen, 96, American politician, member of the North Dakota House of Representatives (1993–2000).
- John August Swanson, 83, American visual artist.
- Mervyn Taylor, 89, Irish politician, TD (1981–1997) and minister for labour (1993).
- Sue Thompson, 96, American pop and country singer ("Sad Movies (Make Me Cry)", "Norman").
- Jorge Liberato Urosa Savino, 79, Venezuelan Roman Catholic cardinal, archbishop of Valencia (1990–2005) and Caracas (2005–2018), COVID-19.
- Nino Vaccarella, 88, Italian racecar driver.
- Yogendra Vyas, 80, Indian Gujarati-language writer and linguist, suicide by hanging.
- Andrew Webster, 69–70, British sociologist.

=== 24 ===
- Emmanuel Agassi, 90, Iranian-American Olympic boxer (representing Iran 1948, 1952).
- Julhas Uddin Ahmed, 87, Bangladeshi Nazrul Geet singer and teacher, dengue virus.
- Robert Altman, 76, American photographer.
- Eric Cassell, 93, American physician and bioethicist.
- Ihor Cherkun, 56, Ukrainian football player (Torpedo Zaporizhzhia, Metalurh Zaporizhzhia, Viktor Zaporizhzhia) and manager.
- Cornelia Clark, 71, American jurist, justice of the Tennessee Supreme Court (since 2005), cancer.
- William E. Davis, 92, American academic administrator, president of Idaho State University (1965–1975) and University of New Mexico (1975–1982).
- Eugeniusz Faber, 82, Polish footballer (Ruch Chorzów, Lens, national team).
- Gomaa Frahat, 80, Egyptian political cartoonist.
- Freddie Fu, 70, Hong Kong-American orthopaedic surgeon, melanoma.
- Jitender Mann Gogi, 38, Indian mobster, shot.
- Grey Gowrie, 81, British politician, businessman, and arts administrator, chancellor of the Duchy of Lancaster (1984–1985).
- Ishfaq Nadeem Ahmad, Pakistani military officer, chief of general staff (2013–2015), cardiac arrest.
- Diana Natalicio, 82, American academic administrator, president of the University of Texas at El Paso (1988–2019).
- Waka Nathan, 81, New Zealand rugby union player (Auckland, national team).
- Ota, 67, Brazilian cartoonist.
- Raymundo Joseph Peña, 87, American Roman Catholic prelate, bishop of El Paso (1980–1995) and Brownsville (1995–2009).
- Lenka Peterson, 95, American actress (Quilters, Headin' for Broadway, Dragnet).
- Paul Quilès, 79, French politician, deputy (1993–2007), minister of defence (1985–1986) and the interior (1992–1993), cancer.
- Takao Saito, 84, Japanese manga artist (Golgo 13), pancreatic cancer.
- Staffan Skott, 78, Swedish writer and journalist.
- Valeriy Skvortsov, 76, Ukrainian Olympic high jumper (1964, 1968).
- Harold Tanasichuk, 83, Canadian curler.
- Tony Torchia, 77, American baseball coach (Boston Red Sox).
- Jorge Velasco Mackenzie, 72, Ecuadorian writer.
- Robert R. Weber, 95, American politician, member of the South Dakota House of Representatives (1973–2000).

=== 25 ===
- Terry K. Amthor, 62, American game designer (Dungeons & Dragons).
- Len Ashurst, 82, English football player (Sunderland, Hartlepool United) and manager (Cardiff City).
- Théoneste Bagosora, 80, Rwandan military officer and convicted war criminal, organiser of the 1994 genocide against the Tutsi in Rwanda.
- Jimmy Bales, 85, American politician.
- Dean Berta Viñales, 15, Spanish motorcycle racer, race collision.
- Kamla Bhasin, 75, Indian feminist activist.
- Swapan Kumar Chakravorty, 67, Indian academic, chairman of CSSSC (since 2020), complications from COVID-19.
- Henri Cirelli, 86, Luxembourgish footballer (Avenir Beggen, Swift Hesperange, F91 Diddeleng).
- Franco Di Giuseppe, 79, Italian politician, deputy (1992–1994), complications from traffic collision.
- Marcello Diomedi, 78, Italian footballer (ACF Fiorentina, Bari, Pol. Alghero).
- Richard J. Eden, 99, British theoretical physicist.
- Soren Edsberg, 75, Danish-born American painter.
- Antonio Franco, 74, Spanish journalist (El Periódico de Catalunya, El País).
- Elmer Fung, 73, Taiwanese politician, member of the Legislative Yuan (1999–2002), cancer.
- Hassan Hassanzadeh Amoli, 92, Iranian Islamic scholar, lung disease.
- Reed Henderson, 87, American football player (Edmonton Eskimos).
- Bo Kaiser, 91, Swedish Olympic sailor (1964).
- Lam Yuen-yee, 36–37, Hong Kong marine police officer, drowned.
- Patricio Manns, 84, Chilean singer, composer ("Arriba en la Cordillera") and writer, heart failure.
- Greg Miskiw, 71, British journalist (News of the World), lung cancer.
- Pierre Montastruc, 89, French politician, deputy (1986–1988).
- Carlos Neder, 67, Brazilian politician and physician, São Paulo MLA (2005–2007, 2010–2011, 2013–2019), COVID-19.
- Greg Parke, 73, Australian footballer (Melbourne, Footscray, Norwood).
- Al Ramsawack, 91, Trinidadian folklorist.
- Ian Riddell, 82–84, Scottish footballer (St Mirren, Berwick Rangers).
- Walter Scott Jr., 90, American civil engineer, CEO of Kiewit Corporation (1979–1998).
- Sergei Shuvalov, 70, Russian politician, chairman of the Saratov Oblast Duma (2002–2005) and senator (2005–2010), COVID-19.
- Thomas A. Waldmann, 91, American immunologist.
- Gerhard Weidner, 88, German Olympic racewalker.
- Marie Wilcox, 87, American lexicographer, last fluent speaker of the Wukchumni dialect.
- Valree Fletcher Wynn, 99, American academic.
- Mehdi Yaghoubi, 91, Iranian wrestler, Olympic silver medallist (1956), heart disease.

=== 26 ===
- Siamak Atlasi, 85, Iranian actor (Ballad of Tara, A Man Without a Shadow), COVID-19.
- Joe Amstutz, 86, American football player (Cleveland Browns).
- Jaison Barreto, 88, Brazilian physician and politician, deputy (1971–1979) and senator (1979–1987).
- Ann Breault, 82, Canadian politician, New Brunswick MLA (1987–1999).
- Eliécer Cárdenas, 70, Ecuadorian novelist.
- McDonald Craig, 90, American folk musician.
- Myron Dewey, 49, American filmmaker, traffic collision.
- José Freire Falcão, 95, Brazilian Roman Catholic cardinal, bishop of Limoeiro do Norte (1967–1971), archbishop of Teresina (1971–1984) and Brasília (1984–2004), COVID-19.
- Frances Farenthold, 94, American politician, member of the Texas House of Representatives (1969–1973), complications from Parkinson's disease.
- Zumrud Gulu-zade, 89, Azerbaijani philosopher.
- Karl-Sören Hedlund, 83, Swedish ice hockey player (Västerås, Skellefteå AIK, national team).
- Syarhey Herasimets, 55, Belarusian football player (Dinamo Minsk, national team) and manager (Junior Sevan).
- Kjersti Holmen, 65, Norwegian actress (Orion's Belt, Rød snø, The Telegraphist).
- Alan Lancaster, 72, English rock bassist (Status Quo, The Party Boys), complications from multiple sclerosis.
- Al Mantello, 87, Australian footballer (North Melbourne).
- Ndakasi, 14, Congolese mountain gorilla.
- Manus O'Riordan, 72, Irish trade union leader and political activist.
- Heini Paas, 102, Estonian art historian.
- Jean-Pierre Pénicaut, 84, French politician, deputy (1980–1993).
- Paddy Prendergast, 95, Irish Gaelic footballer (Mayo GAA).
- Kirill Razlogov, 75, Russian film critic and cultural researcher.
- Herzl Shafir, 92, Israeli general, commissioner of Israel Police (1980).
- Mark Strudwick, 76, British military officer, general officer commanding Scotland (1997–2000).
- Pearl Tytell, 104, American criminologist.
- Bobby Zarem, 84, American publicist (Dustin Hoffman, Cher, Arnold Schwarzenegger), lung cancer.

=== 27 ===
- Martin Burleigh, 70, English footballer (Darlington, Carlisle United, Hartlepool United).
- Fernande Chiocchio, 92, Canadian mezzo-soprano, pianist and teacher.
- B. B. Dutta, 83, Indian politician, MP (1993–1999).
- François Florent, 84, French theatre actor, founder of the Cours Florent.
- Francisco Franco del Amo, 61, Spanish academic and author.
- Rudy Haluza, 90, American Olympic race walker (1960, 1968).
- Gordon Hudson, 59, American football player (BYU Cougars, Los Angeles Express, Seattle Seahawks).
- Roger Hunt, 83, English Hall of Fame footballer (Liverpool, Bolton Wanderers, national team), world champion (1966).
- Bengt K. Å. Johansson, 84, Swedish politician, minister of consumer affairs (1985–1988) and public administration (1988–1991), governor of Älvsborg County (1991–1997).
- David Komansky, 82, American investment management executive, CEO of Merrill Lynch (1996–2002).
- Pocha Lamadrid, 76, Argentine anti-racism activist.
- Heinz Lieven, 93, German actor (Group Portrait with a Lady, Das Rätsel der Sandbank, This Must Be the Place).
- Egil Lillestøl, 83, Norwegian particle physicist.
- Cecilia Lindqvist, 89, Swedish sinologist.
- Andrea Martin, 49, American singer-songwriter ("I Love Me Some Him", "Before You Walk Out of My Life", "Don't Let Go"), and record producer.
- James L. Mathewson, 83, American politician, member of the Missouri House of Representatives (1975–1981) and Senate (1981–2005).
- Ibrahim Mbombo Njoya, 83, Cameroonian politician and royal, king of the Bamum people (since 1992), COVID-19.
- Viktor Mikhailov, 97, Russian military officer, head of the Riga Higher Military Political School (1977–1987).
- Boban Petrović, 64, Serbian basketball player (Partizan, Yugoslavia national team).
- Frederick L. Pratt, 93, American politician.
- Sam Riddle, 85, American disc jockey and television producer (Star Search), complications from Lewy body dementia.
- Madeleine Tchicaya, 91, Ivorian politician.
- R. R. Venkat, 54, Indian film producer (Divorce Invitation, Lovely, Damarukam), kidney disease.
- Ülo Vilimaa, 80, Estonian dancer, choreographer, and painter.

=== 28 ===
- Nana Ampadu, 76, Ghanaian musician.
- Karan Armstrong, 79, American operatic soprano.
- Nasser al-Awlaki, 74–75, Yemeni academic and politician, president of Sanaa University and minister of agriculture (1988–1990).
- Will Bagley, 71, American historian and writer (Blood of the Prophets).
- Bala V. Balachandran, 84, Indian educationist, founder of the Great Lakes Institute of Management.
- Ed Beauvais, 84, American airline executive.
- James Buswell, 74, American violinist.
- Robert Jay Charlson, 84, American atmospheric scientist, climate scientist.
- Steve Davis, 61, American baseball player (Toronto Blue Jays, Cleveland Indians), cancer.
- Robert Gibanel, 89, French racing cyclist.
- Paul Girod, 90, French politician, mayor of Droizy (since 1958) and senator (1978–2008).
- Wajid Shamsul Hasan, Pakistani diplomat.
- Edward Helfrick, 93, American politician, member of the Pennsylvania House of Representatives (1977–1980) and Senate (1981–2003).
- Eberhard Jüngel, 86, German theologian.
- Tommy Kirk, 79, American actor (Old Yeller, The Shaggy Dog, Swiss Family Robinson).
- Princess Lalla Malika of Morocco, 88, Moroccan royal.
- Bienvenido Lumbera, 89, Filipino poet, critic, and dramatist.
- Farida Majid, 79, Bangladeshi poet, translator, and academic, cancer.
- Ed Mason, 75, Canadian newscaster, complications from surgery.
- Vassi Naidoo, 66, South African businessman.
- Phi Nhung, 51, Vietnamese-American singer and actress, COVID-19.
- Achille Pace, 98, Italian painter.
- Bruno Pavelić, 84, Serbian basketball player (Beograd, Mladost Zemun).
- B. Satyaji Rao, 91, Indian cricket umpire.
- Mike Renzi, 80, American composer and music director (Sesame Street).
- Maria Roka, 81, Hungarian Olympic sprint canoer (1964).
- Barry Ryan, 72, British pop singer ("Eloise") and photographer.
- Lonnie Smith, 79, American jazz musician, pulmonary fibrosis.
- Ray Snell, 63, American football player (Tampa Bay Buccaneers, Pittsburgh Steelers, Detroit Lions).
- Moshe David Tendler, 95, American rabbi and biologist.
- Stephen Thega, 75, Kenyan Olympic boxer (1968, 1972).
- Michael Tylo, 73, American actor (The Young and the Restless, Zorro, Guiding Light).
- Jacques Vivier, 90, French racing cyclist.
- Wang Jianmin, 78, Chinese shàngjiàng, commander of the Chengdu Military Region (2002–2007).
- Fred Woudhuizen, 62, Dutch philologist.
- Alan Woods, 84, English footballer (Tottenham Hotspur, Swansea City, York City).
- Andrei Zeltser, 31, Belarusian IT worker, shot.

=== 29 ===
- Kune Amini, 56, Papua New Guinean cricketer (national team).
- Ottavio Compagnoni, 95, Italian Olympic cross-country skier (1952, 1956, 1960).
- Joe Davis, 98, American politician, member of the Florida House of Representatives (1962–1966).
- Alexandre José Maria dos Santos, 97, Mozambican Roman Catholic cardinal, archbishop of Maputo (1976–2003).
- Gene Dresselhaus, 91, American condensed matter physicist.
- Carsten Eggers, 64, German sculptor and painter.
- Benno Friesen, 92, Canadian politician, MP (1974–1993).
- Antonio Gasset, 75, Spanish journalist and television host (Días de cine).
- Hayko, 48, Armenian singer ("Anytime You Need") and songwriter, COVID-19.
- Maeve Ingoldsby, 73-74, Irish television writer.
- Ravil Isyanov, 59, Russian-born American actor (GoldenEye, K-19: The Widowmaker, Transformers: Dark of the Moon), cancer.
- Nicholas Krawciw, 85, American major general.
- Bronius Kutavičius, 89, Lithuanian composer.
- Olivier Libaux, 57, French record producer and musician (Nouvelle Vague).
- Chuck Lindstrom, 85, American baseball player (Chicago White Sox).
- Lee Vernon McNeill, 56, American Olympic sprinter (1988), COVID-19.
- Glyn Moses, 93, Welsh rugby league player (Salford, St Helens, national team).
- Barrie Nelson, 88, Canadian animator (Heavy Metal, Watership Down, A Boy Named Charlie Brown).
- Julia Nixon, 66, American singer, complications from COVID-19.
- Ayoub Pourtaghi, 48, Iranian Olympic boxer.
- Lee Quarnstrom, 81, American journalist.
- Koteswara Rao, 91, Indian engineer.
- Heiko Salzwedel, 64, German racing cyclist and manager.
- Jim Service, 88, Australian company director.
- Sabam Sirait, 84, Indonesian politician, five-time MP .
- Ivan Tasovac, 55, Serbian pianist, manager, and politician, minister of culture and information (2013–2016) and deputy (since 2020).
- Mohib Ullah, 46, Burmese Rohingya rights advocate, shot.
- Claire Van Ummersen, 86, American scholar and academic administrator, president of Cleveland State University (1993–2001), traffic collision.
- Jim Ursel, 84, Canadian curler, cancer.
- Angelo Vasta, 80, Australian judge, member of the Supreme Court of Queensland (1984–1989).
- François Vérove, 59, French serial killer (Murder of Cécile Bloch) and police officer, suicide by barbiturate overdose.

=== 30 ===
- Lennart Åberg, 79, Swedish jazz saxophonist and composer.
- Betty Amos, 87, American musician.
- Beatrix, Countess of Schönburg-Glauchau, 91, Hungarian-born German aristocrat and socialite.
- Jacques Bellanger, 90, French politician, senator (1986–1995, 1997–2004).
- Aboagye Brenya, 83, Ghanaian actor.
- Dorothea Brown, 83, New Zealand librarian.
- Clement Chiwaya, 50, Malawian politician, MP (2004–2019), suicide by gunshot.
- Luigi Conti, 80, Italian Roman Catholic prelate, bishop of Macerata-Tolentino-Recanati-Cingoli-Treia (1996–2006) and archbishop of Fermo (2006–2017).
- Isabel Cruz, Portuguese-born American computer scientist. (death announced on this date)
- Carlisle Floyd, 95, American opera composer.
- Greg Gilbert, 44, British musician (Delays), bowel cancer.
- Jenny Kirk, 76, New Zealand politician, MP (1987–1990).
- Vladislav Lemish, 51, Azerbaijani footballer (Kuban Krasnodar, CSKA Moscow, national team).
- Xicoténcatl Leyva Mortera, 81, Mexican politician, governor of Baja California (1983–1989), lung cancer.
- Hassan Tarighat Monfared, 75, Iranian physician and politician, minister of health and medical education (2012–2013), fall.
- Donna Nalewaja, 81, American politician, member of the North Dakota House of Representatives (1983–1986) and Senate (1987–1998), COVID-19.
- John B. MacChesney, 92, American chemist.
- Philip Owen, 88, Canadian politician, mayor of Vancouver (1993–2002), complications from Parkinson's disease.
- José Pérez Francés, 84, Spanish road racing cyclist.
- Palmer Pyle, 84, American football player (Baltimore Colts, Minnesota Vikings, Oakland Raiders).
- John Rigas, 96, American cable television executive and convicted fraudster, co-founder of the Adelphia Communications Corporation and owner of the Buffalo Sabres (1997–2005).
- Ary Rigo, 74, Brazilian politician, vice-governor of Mato Grosso do Sul (1991–1994), complications from a fall.
- Adelina Rodriguez, 101, Filipino politician, mayor of Quezon City (1976–1986).
- Koichi Sugiyama, 90, Japanese composer, conductor, and orchestrator (Dragon Quest), septic shock.
- Thora Whitehead, 85, Chilean-born Australian malacologist.
