= Montastruc =

Montastruc may refer to several communes in France:

- Montastruc, Lot-et-Garonne
- Montastruc, Hautes-Pyrénées
- Montastruc, Tarn-et-Garonne
- Montastruc-de-Salies, Haute-Garonne
- Montastruc-la-Conseillère, Haute-Garonne
- Montastruc-Savès, Haute-Garonne

== See also ==
- Pierre Montastruc (1932–2021), French politician
