= Franco Di Giuseppe =

Italian politician (1941–2021)

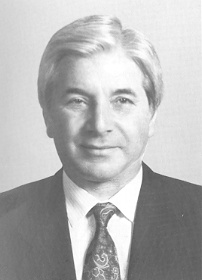
Francesco Di Giuseppe

Cosimo Damiano Francesco Di Giuseppe (1 December 1941 – 26 September 2021) was an Italian politician.

Di Giuseppe was born in Foggia on 1 December 1941. When he was 13, he became a member of Young Italy, the youth wing of the Italian Social Movement. Di Giuseppe was elected to the Apricena municipal council at the age of 21. He joined Christian Democracy and grew close to Vincenzo Russo, remaining affiliated with the party throughout his service on the Chamber of Deputies from 1992 to 1994. Di Giuseppe later joined Brothers of Italy and served as a provincial coordinator of that party. He resigned his party positions in 2020 and retired from politics. Di Giuseppe was injured in a traffic collision on 27 July 2021, that killed his brother Egidio. He died of his injuries at a hospital in Chieti on 26 September 2021.
