= Kumiko Serizawa =

Japanese-American doll maker (1928–2021)

Kumiko Serizawa (17 December 1928 – 18 September 2021) was a Japanese American master doll-maker of traditional Japanese dolls.

== Early life ==
Serizawa was born in Tokyo. During World War II her parents sent her to live with friends of the family outside the city, for safety. After the end of the war, Serizawa worked as a housekeeper and waitress at US Army "rest and relaxation" facility, the Atami Hotel. While she was employed there her American supervisors gave her the English name Amy.

== Career ==
In 1952, soon after she married, her husband Soroku gave her a gift of a traditional Japanese doll. She became fascinated by the doll, and took lessons for two years at two schools in order to learn how to create them herself. After graduation, she received a certificate certifying her skill as a doll-maker, and took on the professional pseudonym of Kookyu. In 1958, Serizawa, her husband, and her young daughter, Naomi, moved to the United States, where they settled near Los Angeles in the San Fernando Valley, California. There she taught doll-making, and continued to make her own dolls.

Her work was on exhibit for many years at the annual Nisei Week Festival in Los Angeles and at the Japanese American Community Center's annual Obon festival in the San Fernando Valley. She also showed her dolls for ten years at the annual Japan Festival at Disneyland and at the Los Angeles County Museum of Natural History.

== Personal life ==
At the time of her death at the age of 92 she was survived by her husband, Soroku; two daughters; and a granddaughter.
