= Trilochan Singh Wazir =

Indian politician (died 2021)

Member of Jammu and Kashmir Legislative Council

Personal details
- Born: 1953 or 1954 Jammu, India
- Died: September 2021 (aged 67) Delhi, India
- Party: Jammu & Kashmir National Conference

Trilochan Singh Wazir (1953/1954 – September 2021; also known as T. S. Wazir) was an Indian transporter and a former member of Jammu and Kashmir legislative council. He was affiliated with the National Conference political party. He also served as chairperson of the Jammu and Kashmir Gurdwara Management Board and president of All Jammu and Kashmir Transport Welfare Association.

== Murder case ==
He was a resident of Jammu division of Jammu and Kashmir. He left for Delhi on September 1 for Canada scheduled on 3 September, however he went missing on 2 September, a day before he was scheduled to leave for Canada following the birth of his granddaughter. After his family lost contact with him, they filed a mission report with the Jammu and Kashmir Police, and the police subsequently established contact with Delhi Police to trace Wazir. A partial investigation indicated that his driver Harmeet Singh and his alleged associate Harpreet Singh went missing soon after decomposed body of Wazir was recovered in a flat at Moti Nagar where he stayed during those days.

=== Background ===
The police transferred the case to Crime Branch, Delhi for further investigations. During the later criminal investigation, Crime Branch arrested two accused, Rajender Chaudhary alias Raju Ganja, and Balbir Singh alias Billa, while Harpreet is one associate of Raju. Harpreet claimed to be a journalist and was associated with Wazir over the past year. According to partial investigation, his murder is linked to an incident that killed three people with sword, including one Kuldeep alias Pappi, maternal uncle of Harpreet. The incident took place around 1983 in Jammu. Wazir was sentenced to three years and six months in that incident. To gain revenge for Harpreet's maternal uncle's killing, Harpreet planned his alleged murder by offering a job to Wazir's driver and asked him to travel by road on September 3 and Harpreet allegedly shot dead Wazir after giving him sedative with food.

His murder was originally planned by accused in July.
