= Śmierć jak kromka chleba =

1994 film by Kazimierz Kutz

Śmierć jak kromka chleba is a Polish historical film about pacification of Wujek. It was released in 1994.
