= Gil C. Silva =

American politician

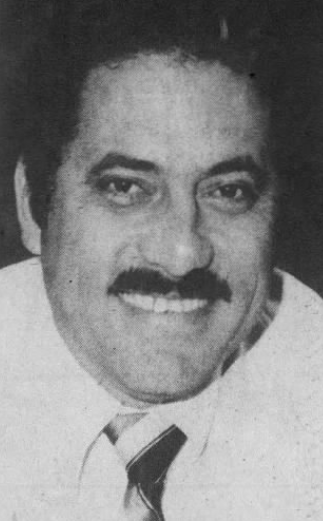
- Silva in 1980

Member of the Hawaii House of Representatives
- In office 1979–1980
- Appointed by: George Ariyoshi

Personal details
- Born: Gillie Cordova Silva Jr. August 10, 1943 Honolulu, Territory of Hawaii, U.S.
- Died: September 22, 2021 (aged 78) Hilo, Hawaii, U.S.
- Party: Democratic

Gillie Cordova Silva Jr. (August 10, 1943 – September 22, 2021) was an American politician. A member of the Democratic Party, he served in the Hawaii House of Representatives from 1979 to 1980.

== Life and career ==
Silva was born in Honolulu, Territory of Hawaii, the son of Gillie Sr. and Mary Silva. He served in the United States Navy, which after his discharge, he worked as a firefighter at Hilo Airport.

Silva served in the Hawaii House of Representatives from 1979 to 1980.

== Death ==
Silva died on September 22, 2021, at his home in Hilo, Hawaii, at the age of 78.
