= Giulia Daneo Lorimer =

Italian violinist and singer (1932–2021)

- Born: 16 July 1932; Lugano, Switzerland
- Died: 11 September 2021 (aged 89)
- Other names: Violinist; Singer
- Years active: 1975–2021

Giulia Daneo Lorimer (16 July 1932 – 11 September 2021) was an Italian violinist and singer.

== Biography ==
Born in Switzerland, Lorimer was the daughter of an Italian diplomat and an American mother and spent her childhood in Bulgaria. In 1943, her family returned to Italy on board the Orient Express. In 1947, her father was appointed Consulate General of Italy in Philadelphia. While in the United States, she met her husband George Lorimer. The couple married in 1951 and had 11 children together.

Lorimer and her husband moved to Italy in 1955 and settled in Scandicci. In 1975, she was one of the founding members of the band Whisky Trail, which recorded 11 albums and performed in concerts. In the 1990s, she directed the Centro Arles association, which became defunct in 2002. On 22 May 2001, she received the "Filo d'argento" alongside Tina Anselmi, Manlio Cancogni, and Rolando Panerai.

Giulia Daneo Lorimer died on 11 September 2021 at the age of 89.

== Publications ==
- Non domandarmi
- La lana rimasta sulle siepi (2022)

== Discography ==
=== Whisky Trail ===
- Irish Songs (1975)
- Irish Songs and Dances (1977)
- Miriana (1979)
- Dies Irae (1982)
- Pooka (1986)
- The Frenzy of Suibhne (1992)
- The White Goddess (1997)
- The Great Raid (2002)
- Irlanda in Festa (2005)
- Chaosmos (2007)
- San Frediano, un irlandese a Firenze (2008)
- Celtic Fragments (2013)

=== Solo ===
- Nana's Lullabyes (2005)
- Giulia Lorimer & Whisky Trail Nana's Lullabyes (2012)
