= Madeleine Tchicaya =

Ivorian politician (1930–2021)

Member of the National Assembly of Côte d'Ivoire
- In office 1976–1980
- President: Félix Houphouët-Boigny
- Parliamentary group: Democratic Party of Ivory Coast – African Democratic Rally

Personal details
- Born: Madeleine Yao Kacoubla; 28 April 1930 Zangué, Ivory Coast, French West Africa
- Died: 27 September 2021 (aged 91) Abidjan, Ivory Coast
- Party: Democratic Party of Ivory Coast – African Democratic Rally (1976–1980)
- Spouse: Roger Félix Tchicaya (died 2018)
- Education: National School of Administration

Madeleine Tchicaya (née Yao Kacoubla; 28 April 1930 – 27 September 2021) was an Ivorian politician. She is known for being the first female graduate of the National School of Administration.

== Early life and education ==
Tchicaya was born Madeleine Yao Kacoubla on 28 April 1930 in Zangué, Ivory Coast. She was the only daughter of her father, who defied cultural expectations of the time by educating his daughter rather than marrying her off; this made him the laughing stock of the local community. In 1961, she passed the entrance exam for the National School of Administration following her studies in Montpellier, France. She graduated in diplomacy atop her class in 1965, becoming the first female graduate of the school.

== Career ==
Tchicaya worked roles in administration in the Ministry of Foreign Affairs, as Deputy Director of Political Affairs, and then as Deputy Director of International Cooperation. From 1970 to 1975, she worked in the Ministry of Tourism as the Director of Tourism Promotion Operations. In 1976, she was elected to the National Assembly of Côte d'Ivoire during its fifth legislature for the Democratic Party of Ivory Coast – African Democratic Rally (PDCI), where she served until 1980. She declined President Félix Houphouët-Boigny's offer to run for a second term as she was, according to Afrique sur 7, "bored to death".

Tchicaya was a member of and once a candidate for presidency for the Association des Femmes Ivoiriennes. She claims she was forced to withdraw her candidacy on the day of election at the request of the President, Houphouët-Boigny, after claims she was funded by Muammar Gaddafi. She worked at Jean Abile Gal until her retirement.

== Personal life and death ==
She married Roger Félix Tchicaya, the former Chancellor of Foreign Affairs and former Chief of Staff at the Ministry, who died in 2018. Tchicaya was the mother of Guillaume Tchicaya, a pioneer of reggae. Tchicaya died on 27 September 2021 in Abidjan, Ivory Coast.
