= Radmilo Pavlović =

Serbian footballer (1981–2021)

Personal information
- Date of birth: 29 August 1981
- Place of birth: Kruševac, SFR Yugoslavia
- Date of death: 11 September 2021 (aged 40)
- Height: 1.77 m (5 ft 10 in)
- Position: Left-back

Senior career*
Years	Team	Apps	(Gls)
2000	Napredak Kruševac	8	(1)
2000–2001	Trayal Kruševac	25	(10)
2001–2010	Napredak Kruševac	192	(7)
2010–2011	Prva Petoletka Trstenik		
2011	Borac Bivolje		
- * Club domestic league appearances and goals

Radmilo Pavlović (Serbian Cyrillic: Радмило Павловић; 29 August 1981 – 11 September 2021) was a Serbian footballer who played as a defender.

Born in Kruševac, Pavlović played 200 games for hometown club Napredak Kruševac making his debut against Rudar Kostolac in June 2000 and also had spells at Trayal Kruševac and Prva Petoletka.
