= Donald Harkness =

English cricketer (1931–2021)

Personal information
- Full name: Donald Peter Harkness
- Born: 13 February 1931; Sydney, Australia
- Died: 2 September 2021 (aged 90); Wauchope, New South Wales, Australia
- Batting: Left-handed
- Bowling: Right-arm medium-fast

Domestic team information
- Years: Team
- 1954: Worcestershire

Career statistics
Competition	FC
Matches	13
Runs scored	488
Batting average	25.68
100s/50s	1/1
Top score	163
Balls bowled	420
Wickets	6
Bowling average	45.66
5 wickets in innings	0
10 wickets in match	0
Best bowling	3–29
Catches/stumpings	9/0
- Source: CricketArchive, 3 October 2008

Donald Peter Harkness (13 February 1931 – 2 September 2021) was an Australian first-class cricketer who played in thirteen matches for Worcestershire in 1954.

The highlight of Harkness' short first-class career came against Cambridge University in late June 1954, when he hit 163 in two and three-quarter hours, by a long way his highest score in first-class cricket. Worcestershire nevertheless lost the match. He also played Birmingham League cricket for Kidderminster. In Sydney senior cricket in the 1950s and 1960s, Harkness scored 1612 runs and claimed 168 wickets in First Grade with Gordon, St George and Sutherland.

Harkness and his wife Eleanor, who predeceased him, had two daughters. He died in September 2021, aged 90.
