= Odile Caradec =

French poet (1925–2021)

- Born: Odile Marie Caradec; February 15, 1925; Brest, France
- Died: September 22, 2021 (aged 96); Civray, France
- Occupations: Poet; Writer

Odile Caradec (15 February 1925 – 22 September 2021) was a French poet.

== Biography ==
Odile Caradec spent her childhood in Camaret-sur-Mer, France, and was acquainted with the poet Saint-Pol-Roux.

A librarian at Camille-Guérin High School in Poitiers, she played chamber music as a cellist.

She has described her work as helping readers “unlearn monotony,” writing to “test our verticality” producing “quiet books”. Several bilingual collections have been published, translated by Rüdiger Fischer and illustrated by the French artist Claudine Goux.

== Publications ==
- Tout un monde fluide, illustrations Pierre de Chevilly, Éd. Océanes, 2017.
- République Terre - Republik Erde, bilingue français-allemand, illustrations Claudine Goux, Odile Verlag, 2013.
- Le ciel, le cœur, bilingue français-allemand, illustrations Claudine Goux, éditions en Forêt, 2011.
- Le sang, cavalier rouge, Sac à mots éditions, 2010.
- En belle terre noire, bilingue français-allemand, illustrations Claudine Goux, éditions en Forêt, 2008.
- Masses tourbillonnantes, illustrations de Pierre de Chevilly, Éd. Océanes, 2007.
- Chats, dames, étincelles, bilingue français-allemand, illustrations Claudine Goux, éditions en Forêt, 2005.
- Cymbales lointaines, éditinter, 2003.
- Silence, volubilis!, éditinter, 2002.
- Les Moines solaires, Éd. associatives Clapàs, 2002
- De création en crémation, éditions L’Amateur, 2001
- Chant d'ostéoporose, éditinter, 2000
- Bretagne aux étoiles, La Porte, 2000.
- Vaches, automobiles, violoncelles, avec 32 illustrations couleur, édit. bilingue français-allemand; traduit par édit.en Forêt, Rimbach, Allemagne.
- Jusqu'à la garde, gravures sur bois Alfred Pohl, chez Thomas Reche, Passau, 1997.
- L'Âge Phosphorescent, Fondamente, 1996.
- Citron rouge, Le Dé Bleu, 1996, Prix Charles Vildrac de la SGDL, 1996.
- Santal et clavier pourpre, éditions de L'Arbre à Paroles, 1994.
- La Nuit, velours côtelé, Le Nadir, 1988.
- Les Barbes transparentes, Le Dé bleu, 1981.
- Reprise des vides, édit. Le Verbe et l'Empreinte, 1981.
- Le Tricorne d'eau douce, éd. Jean-Jacques Sergent, 1977
- Le Collant intégral, éditions St Germain-des-Prés, 1975.
- À Vélo, immortels, éditions St Germain-des-Prés, 1974.
- L'Épitaphe évolutive d'un chauve, Fagne, 1972.
- Potirons sur le toit, Traces, 1972.
- Nef lune, Traces, 1969.
