= Guy Friedrich =

French footballer (1928–2021)

Personal information
- Date of birth: 9 August 1928
- Place of birth: Aubagne, France
- Date of death: 20 September 2021 (aged 93)
- Position: Midfielder

Youth career
- Monaco

Senior career*
Years	Team	Apps	(Gls)
1948–1950	Sète	23	(3)
1950–1951	GSC Marseille		
1951–1952	Lyon	16	(3)
1952	Cannes	13	(1)
1952–1953	Franc-Comtois	7	(0)
1953–1956	Angers	85	(3)
1956–1959	Roubaix-Tourcoing	69	(13)
Total		213	(23)
- * Club domestic league appearances and goals

Guy Friedrich (9 August 1928 – 20 September 2021) was a French professional footballer who played as a midfielder.

== Career ==
Born in Aubagne, Friedrich played for Monaco, Sète, GSC Marseille, Lyon, Cannes, Franc-Comtois, Angers and Roubaix-Tourcoing.
