= Heini Paas =

Estonian art historian (1918–2021)

Heini Rosilda Paas
- Born: 6 October 1918; Mõniste Parish (present day Rõuge Parish), Estonia
- Died: 28 September 2021 (aged 102)
- Occupation: Art historian specialising in sculpture of Estonia

Heini Paas (6 October 1918 – 26 September 2021) was an Estonian art historian.

== Personal life and education ==
Heini Rosilda Paas was born on 6 October 1918 in Mõniste Parish in Võru County. She was from a farming family.

She attended Mõniste primary school followed by Valga Common Gymnasium and left in 1938. She attended the University of Tartu from 1938 until 1945, studying art history as her major subject in the Faculty of Philosophy. Voldemar Vaga was among the lecturers. In 1968, after working under the supervision of Voldemar Vaga, she was awarded a candidate's degree for her dissertation on the work of the sculptor Ferdi Sannamees.

Paas turned 100 in October 2018 and died in September 2021, at the age of 102.

== Career and research ==
Paas undertook research into the history of Estonian sculpture. She curated sculpture exhibitions, researching and writing the exhibition catalogues. She also catalogued the sculpture collection of the Estonian Art Museum.

After graduating, although her degree was not formally awarded until 1948, Paas worked as a laboratory assistant in the Department of Art History at the University of Tartu from 1945 until 1950. She then worked as a bibliographer at the Tallinn Central Library. From 1958 she was the custodian of the sculpture collection at the Estonian Art Museum. She was appointed head of the Sculpture Department in 1978. She retired in October 1985.

In 1968, Paas became a member of the Estonian Artists' Union, and was also a member of the Estonian Museum Association.

== Publications ==
Paas wrote over 20 monographs on sculptors and articles on the history of Estonian art that were published by the Estonian Academy of Sciences. These include:

- Eesti NSV Riiklik Kunstimuuseum. // Eesti NSV muuseumid. (Estonian SSR State Art Museum. // Museums of the Estonian SSR.) Tallinn 1961
- Ferdi Sannamees 1895–1963, Tallinn, Kunst, 1974
- Eesti NSV Kunstimuuseumi ajaloost Muuseumi rajamisest ja tegevusest 1919–1940. (On the history of the Estonian SSR Art Museum about the establishment and activities of the museum between 1919 and 1940.) // Tallinn 1980
- Jaan Koort 1883–1983, Tallinn, 1983
- Herman Halliste 1900–1973, Tallinn Kunst, 1985
- Juhan Raudsepp 100: 10. XVII 1896 - 15. XII 1984 [exhibition catalog]. Tallinn, Estonian Art Museum, 1996
- August Weizenberg 1837–1921, Tallinn, Kunst, 1999
- Amandus Adamson 1855–1929, Tallinn, Estonian Art Museum, 2006

== Awards ==
In 1983 she was awarded the Annual Prize in the Art Scholars Section of the Estonian Artists' Union for her book "Jaan Koort 1883–1983".
