= Marcello Diomedi =

Italian footballer (1942–2021)

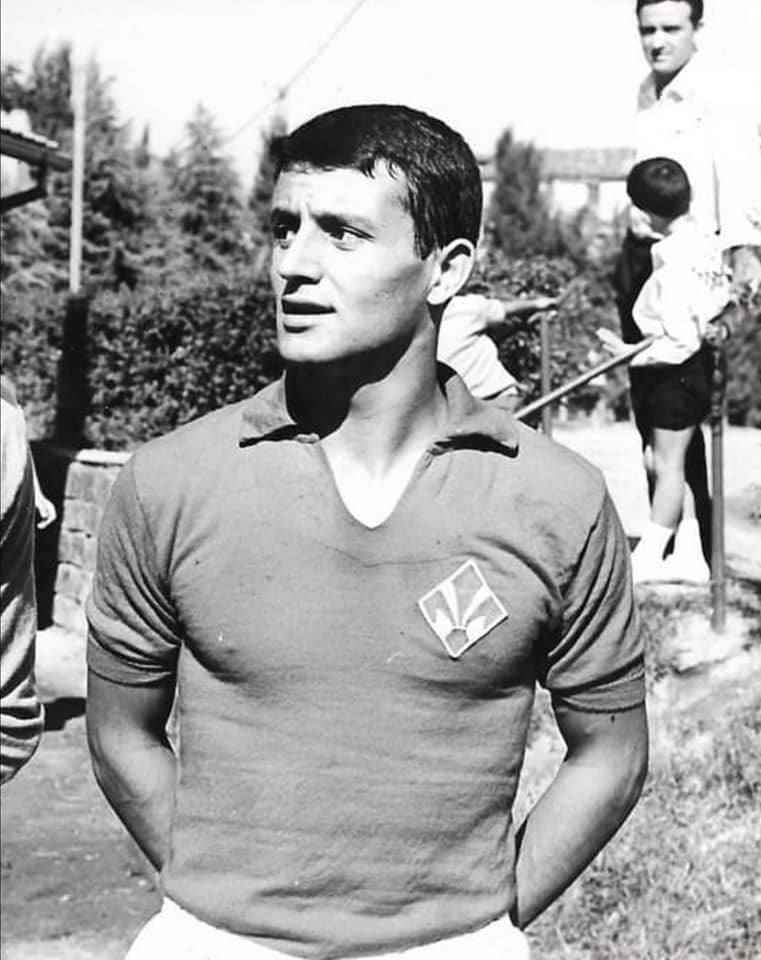

Personal information
- Date of birth: 1 December 1942
- Place of birth: Calangianus, Italy
- Date of death: 25 September 2021 (aged 78)
- Place of death: Jesi, Italy
- Position: Defender

Senior career*
Years	Team	Apps	(Gls)
- Fiorentina
- Bari
- * Club domestic league appearances and goals

Marcello Diomedi (1 December 1942 – 25 September 2021) was an Italian professional footballer who played as a defender for Fiorentina, with whom he won the 1965–66 Coppa Italia and the 1966 Mitropa Cup, before later playing for Bari.
