= Liam Walsh (rugby league) =

English rugby league footballer (1998–2021)

Personal information
- Born: 12 September 1998
- Died: 19 September 2021 (aged 23); Widnes, England

Playing information
- Height: 5 ft 11.5 in (1.82 m)
- Weight: 15 st 4 lb (97 kg)
- Position: Second-row, Loose forward
Club
Years	Team	Pld	T	G	FG	P
2017–2019	Widnes Vikings	2	0	0	0	0
- Source: As of 18 February 2018

Liam Walsh (12 September 1998 – 19 September 2021) was a professional rugby league footballer who played as a second-row forward for the Widnes Vikings in the Championship.

In 2017 he made his Super League début for Widnes against the Leeds Rhinos.

He died on 19 September 2021, aged 23, after being hit by the driver of a car in Widnes around 11.52pm on Saturday 18 September.
