= Jan Piecyk =

Polish footballer (1940–2021)

Personal information
- Date of birth: 17 September 1940
- Date of death: 22 September 2021 (aged 81)
- Position(s): Defender

Senior career*
Years	Team	Apps	(Gls)
- Gwarek Tarnowskie Góry
- Rapid Wełnowiec
1965–1971	GKS Katowice	87	(2)
- *Club domestic league appearances and goals

Jan Piecyk (17 September 1940 – 22 September 2021) was a Polish footballer who played as a defender.

== Career ==
Piecyk started his career with Gwarek Tarnowskie Góry. Later he joined the Rapid Wełnowiec club from Katowice. In 1965 he joined the Polish Ekstraklasa club GKS Katowice (as a result of the merger of GKS and Rapid), for which he appeared in 87 matches and scored two goals. He retired from football in 1971.

== Personal life ==
After his career, he worked for 17 years in the Gottwald coal mine. He lived in Katowice.

== Death ==
He died on 22 September 2021, at the age of 81.
