= Józef Polonek =

Polish footballer (1949–2021)

Józef Polonek (4 February 1949 – 14 September 2021) was a Polish professional footballer who played as a forward for Wisła Kraków in the 1970–71 Ekstraklasa.

== Career ==
Polonek started his career with Wawel Kraków. In the spring round of the 1970–71 Ekstraklasa season, he played four matches in the Ekstraklasa (then known as the I liga) for Wisła Kraków. Between 1971 and 1975 he was a player in Garbarnia Kraków, and he ended his football career at KS Borek.

== Death ==
Polonek died on 14 September 2021. He was buried on 17 September 2021 at the Batowice Cemetery in Kraków.
