= Hans Nordin (ski jumper) =

Swedish ski jumper (1931–2021)

Hans Nordin (7 January 1931 – 23 September 2021) was a Swedish ski jumper who competed in the 1950s. He finished 11th in the individual normal hill event at the 1952 Winter Olympics in Oslo. He was born in Härnösand, Ångermanland.
