= Djohari Kahar =

Indonesian politician (1931–2021)

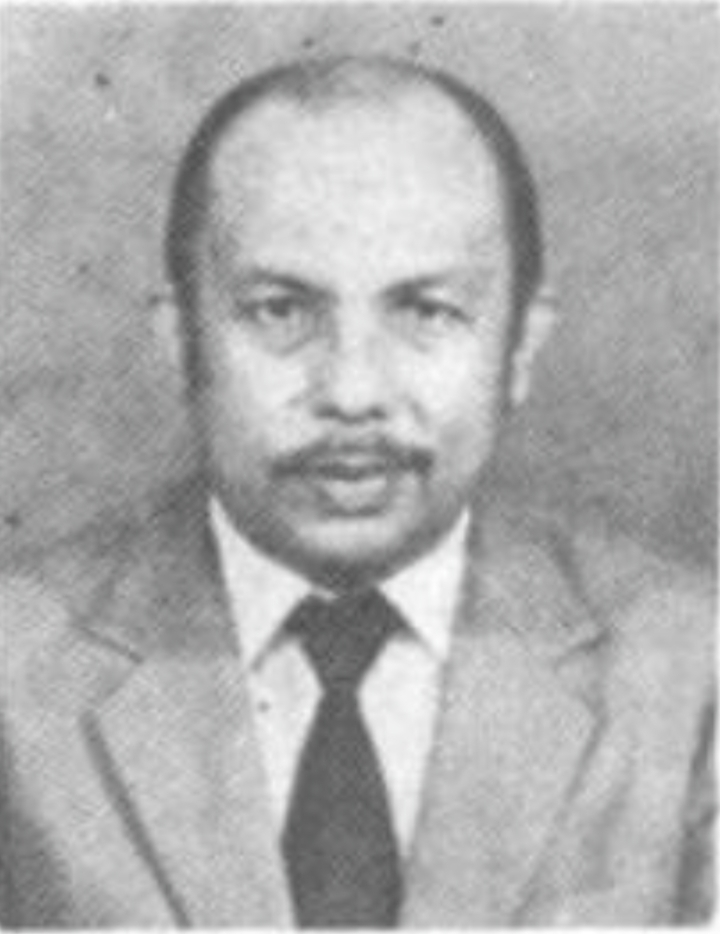
- Djohari Kahar in 1987

Member of the House of Representatives
- In office 1987–1992

Member of the People's Consultative Assembly
- In office 1982–1987

Speaker of the West Sumatra Regional House of Representatives
- In office 1977–1987
- Preceded by: H.A. Burhani Tjokrohandoko
- Succeeded by: Bulkaini

Member of the West Sumatra Regional House of Representatives
- In office 1971–1987

Personal details
- Born: 11 November 1931 Solok, Dutch East Indies
- Died: 12 September 2021 (aged 89) Padang, Indonesia
- Party: Golkar

Djohari Kahar (11 November 1931 – 12 September 2021) was an Indonesian politician and lecturer. A member of Golkar, he served as Speaker of the West Sumatra Regional House of Representatives (DPRD) and also represented West Sumatra on the House of Representatives (DPR) and the People's Consultative Assembly (MPR).

== Biography ==
Djohari was the son of Kaharudin Datuk Rangkayo Basa and his wife, Mariah. His father served as Chief of Police of Central Sumatra and became the first Governor of West Sumatra. Kahar graduated from Madrasah Adabiyah in 1945 and became a freedom fighter. He became a member and chairman of the Student Association of SMA Negeri Bukittinggi, serving from 1950 to 1952. He graduated from the Faculty of Law at Andalas University in 1962.

Kahar started his career as a teacher before being appointed director of SMA Negeri 2 Padang, where he served from 1961 to 1963. He worked as Chief Secretary of Shipyard projects at the Ministry of Energy and Mineral Resources from 1964 to 1966, and served as Secretary of the Ministry from 1966 to 1971. He entered politics in 1965 and became a member of KOSGORO. He was appointed to represent Golkar on the General Elections Commission from 1970 to 1971.

Kahar was elected to the West Sumatra Regional People's Representative Council in 1971 and served as chairman from 1977 to 1987. From 1972 to 1977, he served as deputy chairman of KORPRI for West Sumatra. He served as deputy chairman of KORPRI's board of trustees from 1984 to 1987. He served on the People's Consultative Council from 1982 to 1987 and on the People's Representative Council from 1987 to 1992. He then retired from politics.

Djohari Kahar died in Padang on 12 September 2021 at the age of 89.
