= Vincenzo Russo (politician, born 1924) =

Italian politician

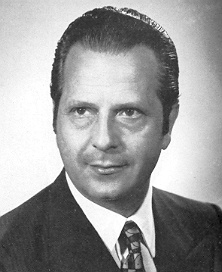
- Russo in 1960

Member of the Senate
- In office 1992–1994

Member of the Chamber of Deputies
- In office 1958–1992

Personal details
- Born: 18 April 1924 Foggia, Italy
- Died: 25 February 2005 (aged 80)

Vincenzo Russo (18 April 1924 – 25 February 2005) was an Italian politician.

Russo was born in Foggia on 18 April 1924, and earned degrees in physics and mathematics. He sat on the Chamber of Deputies from 1958 to 1992, until he was elected to the Senate, on which he served until 1994. Russo died on 25 February 2005.
