= Willy Holzmüller =

German footballer (1931–2021)

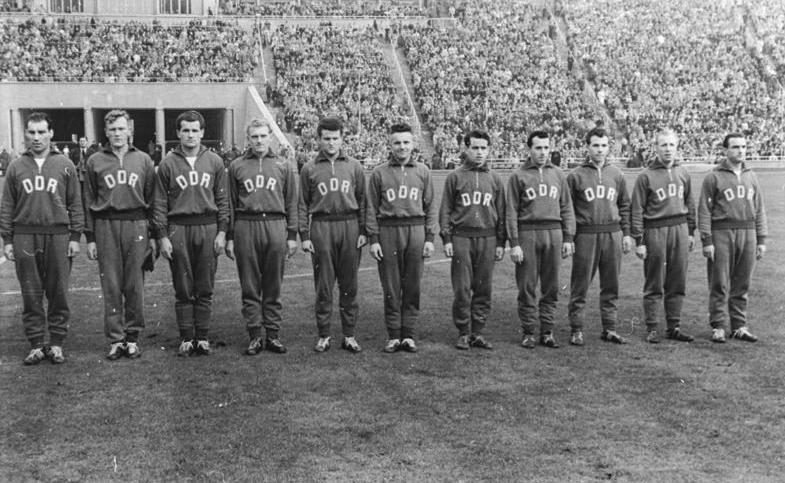
- Willy Holzmüller (fourth from left) with the East Germany national team in 1957

Personal information
- Date of birth: 3 March 1931
- Place of birth: Glauchau, Weimar Germany
- Date of death: 20 September 2021 (aged 90)

International career
Years	Team	Apps	(Gls)
1957	East Germany	1	(0)

Willy Holzmüller (3 March 1931 – 20 September 2021) was a German footballer. He played in one match for the East Germany national football team in 1957.
