= Charles Scot-Brown =

Canadian soldier (1923–2021)

- Born: 31 August 1923; Temiscaming, Quebec, Canada
- Died: 18 September 2021 (aged 98); Toronto, Ontario, Canada
- Other names
- Military Service
- Allegiance: Canada
- Branch: Canadian Army; British Army (CANLOAN)
- Service years: 1940–1971
- Rank: Captain
- Units: Gordon Highlanders; 1st Canadian Parachute Battalion; Princess Patricia's Canadian Light Infantry
- Conflicts: Second World War: Operation Overlord (WIA); Normandy landings; Operation Market Garden; Battle of Arnhem
- Awards: Legion of Honour; Canadian Forces' Decoration

Charles Louis Scot-Brown (31 August 1923 – 18 September 2021) was a Canadian veteran.

Born in Temiscaming, Quebec, Scot-Brown became a cadet at age 17. He was from a military family – his father fought in the First World War and was killed in the Second World War. Scot-Brown served overseas during the latter combat, leading a platoon to destroy a radar station during the Invasion of Normandy. He was also part of an airborne force during Operation Market Garden. He was awarded the French Legion of Honour.
