= Dawn Pawson Bean =

American swimmer (1927–2021)

Dawn Pawson Bean (May 28, 1927 – September 22, 2021) was an American synchronized swimmer.

== Early life and education ==
Bean was born in New York City but moved with her parents, Richard and Elna Pawson, to Albany, California when she was three months old. She excelled athletically at Albany High School, and later became part of the school's Athletics Hall of Fame.

== Career ==
During her career, Bean chaired numerous U.S. synchronized-swimming committees from 1959 onward and served eight years on the U.S. Olympic Committee's executive board. She earned FINA "A"-level judging status in 1971 and officiated at four World Aquatics Championships, three FINA World Cups and the 1988 Seoul Olympics; she was competition director for artistic swimming at the 1984 Los Angeles Games.

In 1963, Bean launched the newsletter Synchro-Info.

In 1996, Bean was inducted into the International Swimming Hall of Fame as an Honor Contributor.
