= Janet Adam =

Scottish potter and sculptor (1940–2021)

- Born: 14 January 1940; Edinburgh, Scotland
- Died: 1 September 2021 (aged 81)
- Education: Edinburgh College of Art

Janet Adam (14 January 1940 – 1 September 2021) was a Scottish potter and sculptor. She was a founding member of the Scottish Potters Association and active in it for 47 years.

== Biography ==
Adam was born in Edinburgh on 14 January 1940, to Barbara Eunice Marindin and Captain Charles Adam, as one of four siblings. Adam attended West Heath Girls' School. After working as a secretary, she learned pottery on the Isle of Mull in the late 1960s. She moved to Edinburgh in the 1970s and was instructed in pottery through independent learning and a part-time course at Edinburgh College of Art.

Adam first founded the Cannonmills Pottery in the 1970s on Warriston Road in Edinburgh. In 1983 the workshop moved to Henderson Row where it was named Adams Pottery. It served her and five other potters as a studio and workshop space.

Adam's work was primarily based around making functional individual pieces of pottery. She was a founding member of the Scottish Potters Association and contributed to it for 47 years.
