= Vassi Naidoo =

South African businessman (1955–2021)

- Born: 1 March 1955; Durban, South Africa
- Died: 28 September 2021 (aged 66); Johannesburg, South Africa
- Education: Chatsworth High School
- Alma mater: University of Durban-Westville
- Occupation: Businessman
- Spouse: Sheila Naidoo
- Children: 2

Vassi Naidoo (1 March 1955 – 28 September 2021) was a South African businessman. He was the chairman of Nedbank.

== Early life ==
Naidoo was born on 1 March 1955, in Durban, South Africa. His Indian grandfather emigrated to South Africa as an indentured servant for a sugar company.

Naidoo was educated at the Chatsworth High School in Durban. He graduated from the University of Durban-Westville, where he earned a bachelor of commerce in 1976, and a diploma in accounting in 1978.

== Career ==
Naidoo began his career at Deloitte in 1977. He became a partner in 1983. He was the chief executive officer of Deloitte Southern Africa from 1998 to 2006.

Naidoo succeeded Reuel Khoza as the chairman of Nedbank in May 2015. He was a non-executive director of Old Mutual.

== Personal life and death ==
Naidoo was married to Sheila, a teacher. They have two children and 4 granddaughters. Naidoo died on 28 September 2021, at the age of 66.
