= Manuel Calvo Fernández =

Spanish boxer

Personal information
- Nationality: Spain
- Born: 22 September 1941 Loranca de Tajuña, Spain
- Died: 10 September 2021 (aged 79) Madrid, Spain

Boxing career

Manuel Calvo Fernández (22 September 1941 – 10 September 2021) was a Spanish boxer. He won the European featherweight title in 1968.

Calvo Fernández died from a heart attack in Madrid on 10 September 2021, at the age of 79.
