= Kohwe =

Ghanaian actor (1946–2021)

- Born: Kofi Laing; 1946
- Died: 16 September 2021 (aged 75); Accra
- Occupation: Actor

Kofi Laing (1946 – 16 September 2021), also known as Kohwe, was a Ghanaian actor and comedian.

== Filmography ==
- Akan Drama
- District Colonial Court
- Kaneshie Odorkor

== Death ==
Kohwe died after suffering from stroke in his residence at Accra.
