= André Vauchez (politician) =

French politician (1939–2021)

Member of the French National Assembly
- In office 5 July 1997 – 18 June 2002
- Preceded by: Dominique Voynet
- Succeeded by: Jean-Marie Sermier
- Constituency: Jura's 3rd constituency

General Councilor of the Canton of Chemin
- In office 1979–1985
- Preceded by: Jean Coron
- Succeeded by: Jean Coron
- In office 1992–2011
- Preceded by: Jean Coron
- Succeeded by: Jean-Michel Daubigney

Mayor of Tavaux
- In office March 1977 – March 2001
- Preceded by: Louis Ravonneaux
- Succeeded by: Jean-Michel Daubigney

Personal details
- Born: 24 April 1939 Arinthod, France
- Died: 22 September 2021 (aged 82) Dole, France
- Party: PS

André Vauchez (24 April 1939 – 22 September 2021) was a French politician. A member of the Socialist Party, he served in the National Assembly for Jura's 3rd constituency from 1997 to 2002. He also served as mayor of Tavaux from 1977 to 2001.
