= Zumrud Guluzadeh =

Azerbaijani philosopher (1932–2021)

- Zümrüd Quluzadə
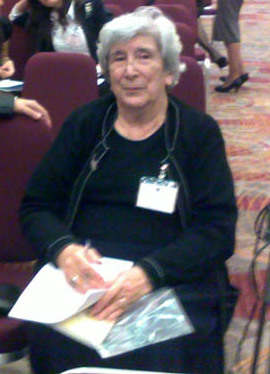
- Born: Zümrüd Quluzadə; 17 March 1932; Baku, Azerbaijani SSR, Transcaucasian SFSR
- Died: 26 September 2021 (aged 89); Baku, Azerbaijan
- Other name: Zümrüd Quluzadə
- Education: Azerbaijan National Academy of Sciences
- Occupations: Professor and Philosopher

Zumrud Guluzadeh (Azerbaijani: Zümrüd Quluzadə [zymˈɾyt guluˈzɑdæ] 17 March 1932, Baku, Azerbaijan SSR – d. 26 September 2021, Baku, Azerbaijan) was an Azerbaijani professor of philosophy at the Azerbaijan National Academy of Sciences, Honored Scholar of the Azerbaijan and recipient of the Shohrat Order.

Zumrud Guluzadeh authored many books on philosophy in the Azerbaijani, Turkish, English, and Russian languages.

== Life ==
Guluzade was born on March 17, 1932, in Baku. In 1949, she graduated from high school with honors and entered the philosophy department of the Faculty of History of Baku State University. Guluzadeh, who graduated with honors with her bachelor's degree, received her master's degree in 1954-1957 and completed her doctoral studies at the Institute of Philosophy and Law of ANAS.

Guluzade's doctoral research topics were the role of the superstructure in an antagonistic society and the philosophical foundations of Hurufism. Her work "Hurufism and its representatives in Azerbaijan" is considered one of the most fundamental works written on this topic. The West-East problem in Azerbaijan was first discussed in the philosophical aspect by Zumrud Guluzadeh (in Закономерности развития восточной философии XIII - XVI вв. и проблема Запад – Восток (1984) [Patterns of development of Eastern philosophy of the XIII - XVI centuries and the West-East problem]). She was one of the editors of the book History of Philosophy of Azerbaijan, the main editor of the first volume of Azerbaijan Philosophy History (2002) and the second volume (2007), and the author of several sections, including the article "Philosophy" of Azerbaijan Encyclopedia (2007). The journal "Problems of Eastern Philosophy" was published under her editorship.

In 2015, she was awarded the Shohrat Order by the order of President Ilham Aliyev.
