= Hans Wagener =

Dutch field hockey player

Personal information
- Nationality: Dutch
- Born: 22 May 1931 Hilversum, Netherlands
- Died: 20 September 2021 (aged 90)

Sport
- Sport: Field hockey

Hans Wagener (22 May 1931 – 20 September 2021) was a Dutch field hockey player. He competed in the men's tournament at the 1960 Summer Olympics.
