= Adam Baumann =

Polish actor (1948–2021)

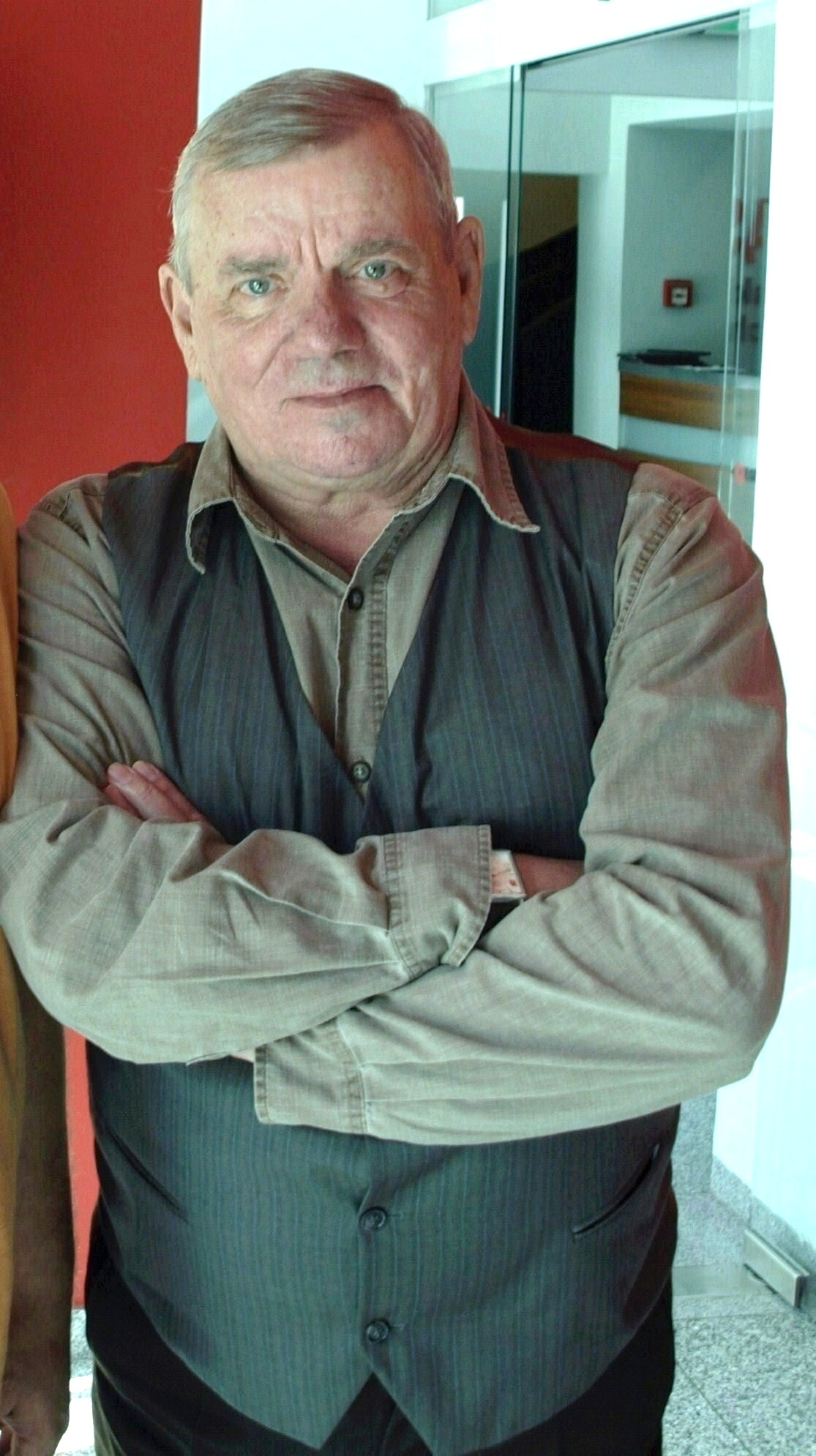
Baumann in 2015

Adam Baumann (27 March 1948 – 6 September 2021) was a Polish actor.
