= B. B. Dutta =

Indian politician (1938–2021)

Bidhu Bhusan Dutta (8 March 1938 – 27 September 2021) was an Indian politician from Meghalaya, British Raj.

He was the General Secretary of Meghalaya Pradesh Congress Committee (1978–1989) and edited a few publications.

He was served as member of the Rajya Sabha in 1993 and served till 1999.

He died due to COVID-19 on 27 September 2021, during the COVID-19 pandemic in India.
