= Antonio Verini =

Italian politician (1936–2021)

Antonio Verini (30 June 1936 – 12 September 2021) was an Italian politician who served as a Deputy in 2006.
