= Bo Kaiser =

Swedish sailor (1930–2021)

Bo Kaiser (6 March 1930 – 25 September 2021) was a Swedish sailor who competed in the 1964 Summer Olympics. Kaiser died on 25 September 2021, at the age of 91.
