= Roger Weissberg =

American psychologist (1951–2021)

Roger P. Weissberg (1951—September 5, 2021) was a researcher in the field of psychology. He was the NoVo Foundation Endowed Chair in Social and Emotional Learning and LAS/UIC Distinguished Professor of Psychology & Education at University of Illinois at Chicago. He was the chief knowledge officer and board vice chair of the Collaborative for Academic, Social, and Emotional Learning (CASEL). He held a PhD in psychology from the University of Rochester and graduated summa cum laude with a BA in psychology from Brandeis University.

== Major publications ==
Books

- Schneider, B. H., Attili, G., Nadel, J., & Weissberg, R. P. (Eds.). (1989). Social competence in developmental perspective. Boston: Kluwer Academic Publishers.
- Weissberg, R. P., Gullotta, T. P., Hampton, R. L., Ryan, R. A., & Adams, G. R. (Eds.). (1997). Healthy children 2010: Enhancing children's wellness. Thousand Oaks, CA: Sage.
- Elias, M. J., Zins, J. E., Weissberg, R. P., Frey, K. S., Greenberg, M. T., Haynes, N. M., Kessler, R., Schwab-Stone, M. E., & Shriver, T. P. (1997). Promoting social and emotional learning: Guidelines for educators. Alexandria, VA: Association for Supervision and Curriculum Development.
- Cicchetti, D., Rappaport, J., Sandler, I. N., & Weissberg, R. P. (Eds.). (2000). The promotion of wellness in children and adolescents. Washington, DC: Child Welfare League of America Press.
- Collaborative for Academic, Social, and Emotional Learning. (2003). Safe and sound: An educational leader's guide to evidence-based social and emotional learning programs. Chicago, IL: Author.
- Weissberg, R. P., Walberg, H. J., O’Brien, M. U., & Kuster, C. B. (Eds.). (2003). Long-term trends in the well-being of children and youth. Washington, DC: Child Welfare League of America Press.
- Weissberg, R. P., & Kumpfer, K. (Eds.). (2003). Special Issue: Prevention that works for children and youth. American Psychologist, 58, 425–490.
- Zins, J. E., Weissberg, R. P., Wang, M. C., & Walberg. H. J. (Eds.). (2004). Building academic success on social and emotional learning: What does the research say? New York: Teachers College Press.
- Patrikakou, E. N., Weissberg, R. P., Redding, S., & Walberg, H. J. (Eds.). (2005). School-family partnerships for children's success. New York: Teachers College Press.
- Devaney, E., O’Brien, M. U., Resnik, H., Keister, S., & Weissberg, R. P. (2006). Sustainable schoolwide social and emotional learning: Implementation guide and toolkit. Chicago, IL: Collaborative for Academic, Social, and Emotional Learning.
- Durlak, J. A., Domitrovich, C. E., Weissberg, R. P., & Gullotta, T. P. (Eds.). (2015). Handbook of social and emotional learning: Research and practice. New York: Guilford.

Journal articles and book chapters

- Mahoney, J. L., Weissberg, R. P., Greenberg, M. T., Dusenbury, L., Jagers, R. J., Niemi, K., Schlinger, M., Schlund, J., Shriver, T. P., VanAusdal, K., & Yoder, N. (2020). Systemic social and emotional learning: Promoting educational success for all preschool to high school students. American Psychologist.
- Shriver, T. P., & Weissberg, R. P. (2020). A response to constructive criticism of social and emotional learning. Phi Delta Kappan, 101(7), 52–57.
- Weissberg, R. P. (2019). Promoting the social and emotional learning of millions of school children. Perspectives on Psychological Science, 14(1), 65–69.
- Weissberg, R. P. (2017). Social and emotional learning: It's time for more international collaboration. In E. Frydenberg, A. J. Martin, & R. J. Collie (Eds). Social and emotional learning in Australia and the Asia Pacific (pp. v-ix). Singapore: Springer.
- Taylor, R. D., Oberle, E., Durlak, J. A. & Weissberg, R. P. (2017). Promoting positive youth development through school-based social and emotional learning interventions: A meta-analysis of follow-up effects. Child Development, 88(4), 1156–1171. doi: 10.1111/cdev.12864.
- Osher, D., Kidron, Y., Brackett, M., Dymnicki, A., Jones, S., & Weissberg, R. P. (2016). Advancing the science and practice of social and emotional learning: Looking back and moving forward. Review of Research in Education, 40, 644–681. doi: 10.3102/0091732X16673595.
- Weissberg, R. P. (2015). Education to promote all students’ social, emotional, and academic competence. In Feuer, M. J., Berman, A. I., & Atkinson, R. C. (Eds.). Past as prologue: The National Academy of Education at 50: Members reflect (pp. 185–191). Washington, DC: National Academy of Education.
- Weissberg, R. P., Durlak, J. A., Domitrovich, C. E., & Gullotta, T. P. (2015). Social and emotional learning: Past, present, and future. In J. A. Durlak, C. E. Domitrovich, R. P. Weissberg, & T. P. Gullotta (Eds.), Handbook of social and emotional learning: Research and practice (pp. 3-19). New York: Guilford.
- Weissberg, R. P., & Cascarino, J. (2013, October). Academic learning + social-emotional learning = national priority. Phi Delta Kappan, 95(2), 8–13.
- Durlak, J. A., Weissberg, R. P., Dymnicki, A. B., Taylor, R. D., & Schellinger, K. (2011). The impact of enhancing students’ social and emotional learning: A meta-analysis of school-based universal interventions. Child Development, 82, 405–432.
