= Frederick L. Pratt =

American politician

Member of the New Hampshire House of Representatives
- In office 1963–1964

Personal details
- Born: August 6, 1928 Woburn, Massachusetts, U.S.
- Died: September 27, 2021 (aged 93)
- Party: Democratic
- Education: Bentley College

Frederick L. Pratt (August 6, 1928 – September 27, 2021) was an American politician. He served as a Democratic member of the New Hampshire House of Representatives.

== Life and career ==
Pratt was born in Woburn, Massachusetts. He attended Keith Academy and Bentley College, earning his bachelor's degree in accounting. He served in the United States Navy.

Pratt served in the New Hampshire House of Representatives from 1963 to 1964.

Pratt died on September 27, 2021, at the age of 93.
