= María del Carmen Rovira Gaspar =

Spanish historian (1923–2021)

María del Carmen Rovira Gaspar (27 July 1923 – 19 September 2021) was a Spanish historian, researcher and academic. She arrived in Mexico in 1939, after the National victory in Spain.
