= Eberhard Kulenkampff =

German-Namibian architect, city planner, and artist (1927–2021)

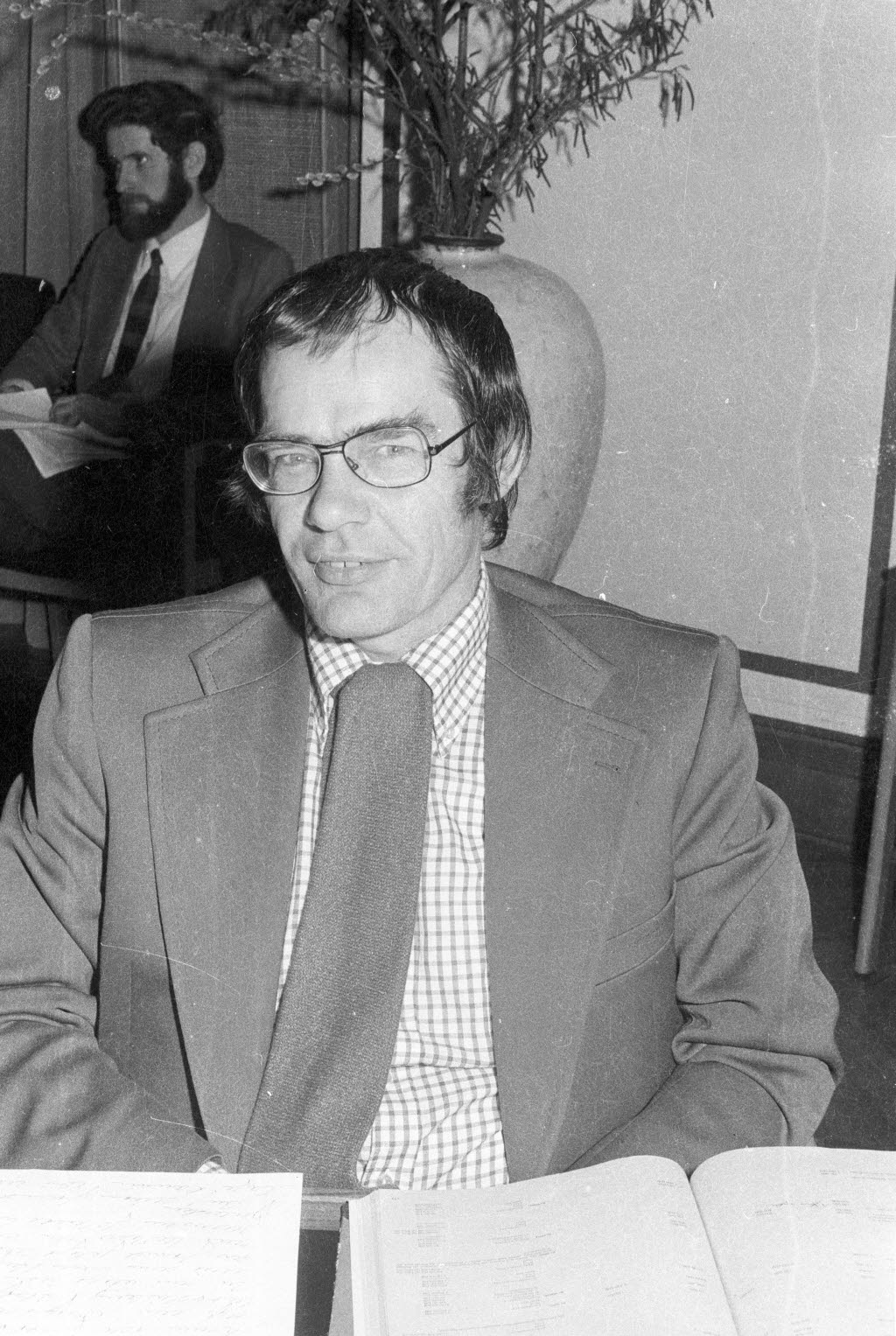
- Eberhard Kulenkampff in a council meeting in 1974
- Born: 10 December 1927; Southwest Africa
- Died: 6 September 2021 (aged 93); Bremen, Germany
- Occupation: Architect

Eberhard Kulenkampff (10 December 1927 – 6 September 2021) was a German-Namibian architect, city planner and artist. He was a director of the Senate of Bremen from 1974 to 1987.

== Life and work ==
He was born in Southwest Africa to a Bremen merchant family. In World War II, he was a soldier from 1944 to 1945 and severely wounded. He studied architecture and city planning at the University of Hanover from 1948 to 1954 and was a member of the Social Democratic Party of Germany. Kulenkampff died in Bremen on 6 September 2021, at the age of 93.

== Bibliography ==
- Jürgen Fränzel: Senator in Bremen Hans Stefan Seifritz. Ein Lebenslauf. Mit Beiträgen von Margot Walther und Eberhard Kulenkampff. Hauschild, Bremen 1987, ISBN 392069984X.
- "Nehmen wir doch die Sterne!" INTERVIEW: 51 Jahre Planetenviertel Garbsen, in: moderneREGIONAL 16,3.
- Jutta Grätz: „Wir entwarfen Straßennamen aus der Sternkarte.“ Interview mit Eberhard Kulenkampff, dem Leiter der Planungsgruppe, die den späteren Stadtteil Auf der Horst entwarf. in: Der Griff nach den Sternen: Geschichte und Gegenwart des Garbsener Stadtteils Auf der Horst, published by Axel Priebs und Rose Scholl, Münster: LIT Verlag, 2016, ISBN 978-3-643-13515-5; Table of Contents (in German)

== Sources ==
- Karl Marten Barfuß, Hartmut Müller, Daniel Tilgner (publisher): Geschichte der Freien Hansestadt Bremen von 1945 bis 2005. Band 2: 1970–1989. Edition Temmen, Bremen 2008, ISBN 978-3-86108-575-1.
