= Daniel Mio =

French politician (1941–2021)

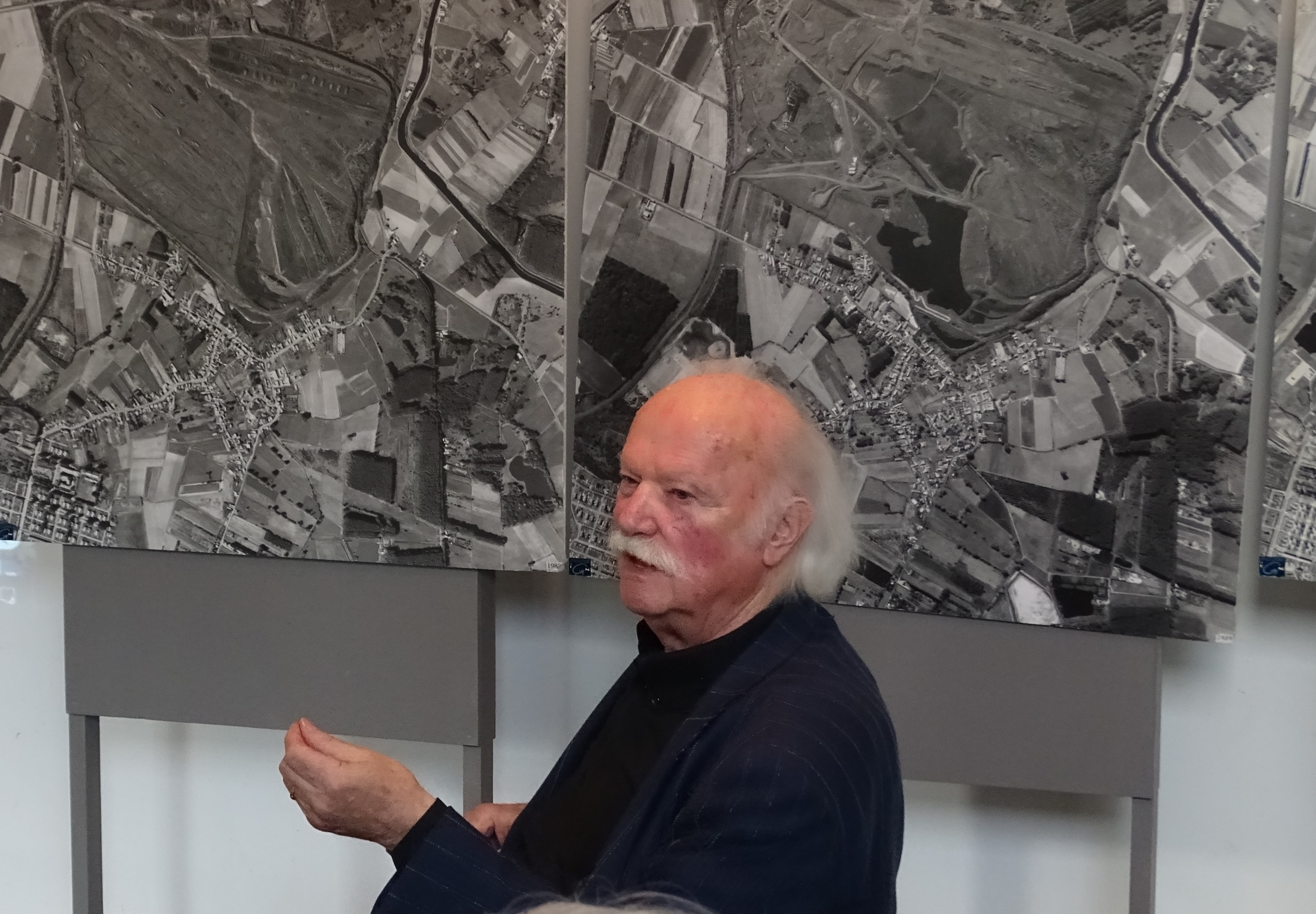
- Mio in 2019

President of the Centre historique minier de Lewarde
- In office 1999–2008

Member of the Regional Council of Nord-Pas-de-Calais
- In office 1997–2004
- In office 1982–1992

President of the Parc naturel régional Scarpe-Escaut
- In office 1989–2012
- Preceded by: position established
- Succeeded by: Érick Charton

Mayor of Rieulay
- In office 1977–2006
- Preceded by: Louis Dellesmes
- Succeeded by: Laurent Houllier

Personal details
- Born: Daniel Charles Mio; 12 May 1941 Somain, France
- Died: 23 September 2021 (aged 80) Lille, France
- Party: PS

Daniel Charles Mio (12 May 1941 – 23 September 2021) was a French politician and teacher. He was known for his development of the Parc naturel régional Scarpe-Escaut.

== Biography ==
Mio was born in Somain on 12 May 1941. His father was a train station manager. He studied at the École normale d'instituteurs de Douai from 1956 to 1960 and spent his military service in Saumur from 1962 to 1964. He became a teacher of mathematics at the Collège Victor-Hugo in Somain.

Mio moved to Rieulay in 1966 and became a Municipal Councilor in 1971. In 1977, he was elected mayor, a position he held until 2006. He was involved in the certification of spoil tip #144, which became the base des Argales. The area then became the Parc naturel régional Scarpe-Escaut and included parts of communes in the Arrondissement of Douai in 1986. He became its first President in 1989. He became a member of the Regional Council of Nord-Pas-de-Calais, serving from 1982 to 1992 and again from 1997 to 2004.

Mio resigned as mayor of Rieulay in 2006 and was replaced by Laurent Houllier. He served as President of the Centre historique minier de Lewarde from 1999 to 2008. He was succeeded by General Councilor of the Canton of Douai-Nord-Est and mayor of Raimbeaucourt Érick Charton. He became an Officer of the Ordre national du Mérite in 2013.

Daniel Mio died in Lille on 23 September 2021 at the age of 80. His funeral was held on 28 September at the Église Saint-Amand de Rieulay and he was buried at the Crématorium d'Orchies.
