= Fjodor Lishajko =

Swedish biochemist (1932–2021)

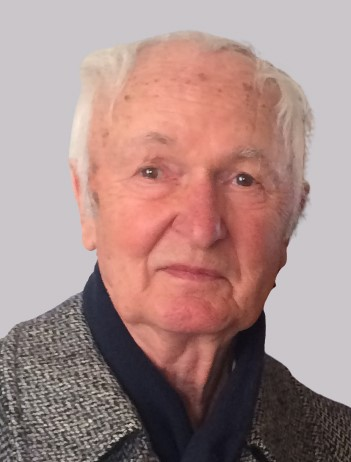
- Lishajko in 2020
- Born: 21 February 1932; Ukraine
- Died: 14 September 2021 (aged 89)
- Occupation: Biochemist

Fjodor Lishajko (21 February 1932 – 14 September 2021) was a Swedish biochemist.

Fjodor Lishajko was born in Veselets located in the Kamenets Podolsky region of Ukraine. The parents owned a small farm that was collectivized in 1934, after which the family was deported to Karelia in the northern part of the Soviet Union. In connection with the Continuation War between Finland and the Soviet Union 1941-1944, the family ended up in the area of East Karelia that was occupied by Finland. After the war, the family lived in the coastal areas of Finland and in 1947, Lishajko and his family fled to Sweden. He graduated as a chemical engineer at Stockholm Technical Institute and joined the faculty at the Department of Physiology, Karolinska Institute in Sweden, where he subsequently became an associate professor, and stayed until his retirement.

Lishajko has investigated the separation and analysis of hormones and their chemical and physiological properties. In 1971 he defended his dissertation on studies on catecholamine release and uptake in adreno-medullary storage glands and was appointed associate professor. The studies included in the dissertation and a number of other works were included in the Nobel Prize-winning research on adrenal hormones by Ulf von Euler in 1970. Important findings have been published in the journals Nature and Science. The total of 66 publications where Lishajko is the author or co-author are cited a total of 1848 times, his h-index is 22. Of particular note are two methodological works concerning the determination of catecholamines by fluorometry, cited 199 times and 659 times, respectively.
