= Martha Patricia Ramírez Lucero =

Mexican lawyer and politician (1952–2021)

Member of the Chamber of Deputies of Mexico
- In office 1 September 2018 – 31 August 2021

Personal details
- Born: 3 September 1952; La Paz, Baja California Sur, Mexico
- Died: 7 September 2021 (aged 69); Tijuana, Mexico
- Political party: PRD; MORENA

Martha Patricia Ramírez Lucero (3 September 1952 – 7 September 2021) was a Mexican lawyer and politician. A member of Morena, she served in the Chamber of Deputies of Mexico from 2018 to 2021.

== Biography ==
Born in La Paz, Baja California Sur, Lucero's family moved to Tijuana when she was one year old. From 1969 to 1974, she studied at the Universidad Autónoma de Guadalajara. She served on the Judiciary of Mexico in the Fifth District Court from 1979 to 1989 and later worked in the Office of the Attorney General of Baja California.

Lucero was nominated to serve as Municipal President of Tijuana in 2004 as a member of the Party of the Democratic Revolution, but was unsuccessful. She was elected to the Chamber of Deputies in 2018 and served until 2021. She was on the Justice Commission and the Constitutional Commission.

Martha Patricia Ramírez Lucero died in Tijuana on 7 September 2021 at the age of 69.
