= Bernardino Cano Radil =

Paraguayan politician and diplomat (1955–2021)

Bernardino Cano Radil (29 November 1955 – 12 September 2021) was a Paraguayan politician and diplomat who served as a Deputy from 1989 to 1998 and later as the Ambassador to Cuba from 2015 until his death from COVID-19 in Havana on 12 September 2021. Bernardino Cano Radil was 65 years old.
