= Amy Hawkins =

Welsh supercentenarian (1911–2021)

Amy Winifred Hawkins (née Evans, 24 January 1911 – 8 September 2021) was a Welsh supercentenarian and dancer from Monmouthshire in South Wales, who became famous for singing the World War I song "It's a Long Way to Tipperary" on her 110th birthday.

The performance was uploaded to the TikTok video service by her 15-year-old great-grandson Sacha Freeman. She was also the oldest living person in Wales at the time of her death.

== Biography ==
Hawkins was born in Cardiff in January 1911, and in 1937, she married George Hawkins. During World War II, she served as a fire watcher in her neighbourhood. Hawkins had six siblings, amongst them five brothers and a surviving 101-year-old sister named Lillian.

She died in Monmouth on 8 September 2021, aged 110, from old age during the COVID-19 pandemic in Wales.

== See also ==
- Vera Lynn
- Captain Sir Tom Moore
