= Roland Jaccard =

Swiss psychologist and writer (1941–2021)

Roland Jaccard (22 September 1941 – 20 September 2021) was a Swiss writer, journalist, and literary critic.
