= M. Staser Holcomb =

United States Navy officer (1932–2021)

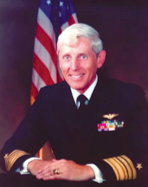
- Born: January 18, 1932; Detroit, Michigan, U.S.
- Died: September 8, 2021 (aged 89); Seattle, Washington, U.S.
- Military career
- Branch: United States Navy
- Service years: 1953–1985
- Rank: Vice Admiral
- Commands: United States Seventh Fleet

M. Staser Holcomb (January 18, 1932 – September 8, 2021) was a vice admiral in the United States Navy. His hometown was Seattle, Washington, where he attended Roosevelt High School. He was a graduate of the United States Naval Academy, class of 1953. During his naval career he served as commander of the USS Guam (LPH-9), Carrier Strike Group One, and the United States Seventh Fleet, from September 15, 1981, to May 9, 1983. He retired in 1985. During his career he also worked in the offices of the Secretary of Defense (as Senior Military Assistant), Secretary of the Navy, and Chief of Naval Operations. From 2001 to 2006, he also served as an advisor to Secretary of Defense Donald Rumsfeld and Harold Brown.

He was married to Joanne and resided in Edmonds, Washington, before his death.
