= Ela Nikbayan =

Iranian trans woman

- Born: 1980 or 1981; Iran
- Died: 14 September 2021 (aged 40); Berlin, Germany
- Cause of death: Self-immolation

Ella Nik Bayan was an Iranian trans woman who, after immigrating to Germany, faced numerous challenges in accepting her gender identity. She committed suicide by self-immolation on 14 September 2021.

== Biography ==
Ella Nik Bayan was born into a religious and traditional family in Southern Iran and faced suppression of her gender identity during her childhood and adolescence. Due to the lack of access to correct information about gender identities and sexual orientations, she suppressed her identity within herself. After immigrating to Germany in 2015, she initially thought she was gay, but gradually realized she was a trans woman.

In Germany, Nik Bayan faced many challenges. In the city of Magdeburg, she was subjected to physical and psychological harassment by the community. These included physical assaults and verbal threats by strangers. Additionally, she had to move several times due to the lack of social acceptance. In 2019, she moved to Berlin, a city known as one of the most LGBTQ+-friendly cities in Europe. However, her social and psychological problems continued.

== Suicide ==
Despite moving to Berlin with hopes of a better life, Nik Bayan continued to struggle with her inner turmoil. At the age of 40, she immolated herself on 14 September 2021, using diesel fuel at the busy Alexanderplatz square in Berlin.

== Desecration of grave ==
On 4 January, unknown individuals desecrated Nik Bayan's grave, leaving a fire extinguisher and a gasoline canister next to it, referencing the manner of her suicide. German police announced they would investigate. The German organization "LSVD" expressed anger at the continued violence against Nikbayan even after her death and called for legal action on the matter.
