= Jaison Barreto =

Brazilian politician and physician (1933–2021)

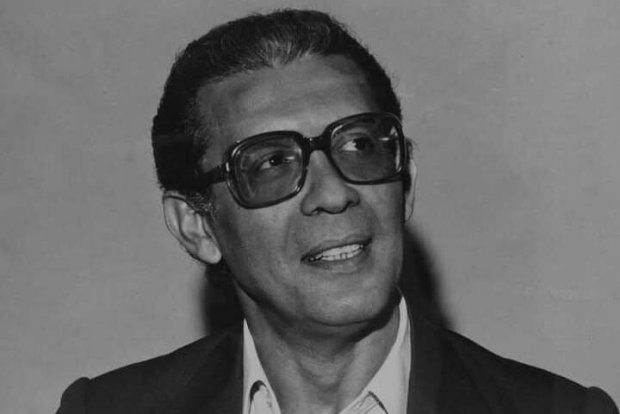

Member of the Chamber of Deputies of Brazil
- In office 1971–1979

Member of the Brazilian Senate
- In office 1979–1987

Personal details
- Born: Jaison Tupy Barreto; 16 August 1933 Laguna, Brazil
- Died: 26 September 2021 (aged 88) Balneário Camboriú, Brazil
- Party: MDB

Jaison Tupy Barreto (16 August 1933 – 26 September 2021) was a Brazilian politician and physician. A member of the Brazilian Democratic Movement, he served in the Chamber of Deputies from 1971 to 1979 and in the Brazilian Senate from 1979 to 1987.
