= Thierry Choffat =

French political scientist (1968–2021)

- Born: 19 May 1968; France
- Died: 6 September 2021 (aged 53); Golbey, France
- Occupation: Political scientist

Thierry Choffat (19 May 1968 – 6 September 2021) was a French political scientist. He specialized in syndicalism, the far right, the far left, and Bonapartism.

== Biography ==
Choffat earned a degree in public law from the University of Rennes 1 and obtained a doctorate in political science. He became a lecturer at the University of Lorraine and joined the Association française de science politique. He served on the council of administrators of the Souvenir napoléonien. In 2010, he became President of the Vosges Napoléoniennes, an association re-enacting events from the department of Vosges.

A Bonapartist activist, Choffat co-founded the political party Rassemblement bonapartiste in 1992. The party dissolved in 1996 and he subsequently co-founded Avenir France République, under which he stood in the 1997 French legislative election, garnering 3% of the vote in Doubs's 3rd constituency. In 2000, he founded France bonapartiste, of which he served as Vice-President. In 2008, he was elected Deputy Mayor of Fraimbois, as well as community councilor in Mortagne. In 2015, he unsuccessfully ran for Departmental Councilor of Canton of Lunéville-2.

Choffat joined the Gaullist party Debout la France. In 2013, he was elected to the party's national council. However, he subsequently left the party due to its shift to the right. He became Vice-President of the party L'Appel au Peuple, founded on 4 May 2021 by David Saforcada.

Thierry Choffat died in Golbey on 6 September 2021 at the age of 53.

== Books ==
- Les élections présidentielles de 1995 (1997)
- Les Francs-Comtois et l'Empire (2004)
- Les syndiqués en France (2007)
- Les Comtois de Napoléon (2010)
- La Bérézina. Suisses et Français dans la tourmente de 1812 (2012)
- Les syndicats catégoriels : CGC, USS-Solidaires, FSU, UNSA. Les syndicats en France (2012)
- Les partis de la gauche anticapitaliste en Europe (2012)
- Les origines bonapartistes de la Participation (2013)
- Le mouvement bonapartiste de 1870 à 2014 (2014)
- Michel Ney, le Brave des Braves (2015)
- Antoine Drouot, Le Sage de la Grande Armée (2017)
- Drouot, Le Sage de la Grande armée (2019)
