= Pierre Montastruc =

French politician (1932–2021)

Member of the French National Assembly
- In office 16 March 1986 – 14 May 1988
- Constituency: Haute-Garonne

Personal details
- Born: 17 January 1932
- Died: 25 September 2021 (aged 89)
- Party: UDF

Pierre Montastruc (17 July 1932 – 25 September 2021) was a French politician. A member of the Union for French Democracy, he served in the National Assembly from 1986 to 1988.
