= 2021 in Canada =

- Decades: 2000s; 2010s; 2020s
- See also: History of Canada; Timeline of Canadian history; List of years in Canada

Events from the year 2021 in Canada.

== Incumbents ==
=== The Crown ===
- Monarch – Elizabeth II

=== Federal government ===
- Governor General – Julie Payette (until January 22), then Mary Simon (from July 26)
- Prime Minister – Justin Trudeau
- Parliament – 43rd (until August 15), then 44th (from November 22)

=== Provincial governments ===
==== Lieutenant Governors ====
- Lieutenant Governor of Alberta – Salma Lakhani
- Lieutenant Governor of British Columbia – Janet Austin
- Lieutenant Governor of Manitoba – Janice Filmon
- Lieutenant Governor of New Brunswick – Brenda Murphy
- Lieutenant Governor of Newfoundland and Labrador – Judy Foote
- Lieutenant Governor of Nova Scotia – Arthur LeBlanc
- Lieutenant Governor of Ontario – Elizabeth Dowdeswell
- Lieutenant Governor of Prince Edward Island – Antoinette Perry
- Lieutenant Governor of Quebec – J. Michel Doyon
- Lieutenant Governor of Saskatchewan – Russell Mirasty

==== Premiers ====
- Premier of Alberta – Jason Kenney
- Premier of British Columbia – John Horgan
- Premier of Manitoba
  - Brian Pallister (until September 1)
  - Kelvin Goertzen (from September 1 to November 2)
  - Heather Stefanson
- Premier of New Brunswick – Blaine Higgs
- Premier of Newfoundland and Labrador – Andrew Furey
- Premier of Nova Scotia
  - Stephen McNeil (until February 23)
  - Iain Rankin (February 23 to August 31)
  - Tim Houston
- Premier of Ontario – Doug Ford
- Premier of Prince Edward Island – Dennis King
- Premier of Quebec – François Legault
- Premier of Saskatchewan – Scott Moe

=== Territorial governments ===
==== Commissioners ====
- Commissioner of Northwest Territories – Margaret Thom
- Commissioner of Nunavut
  - Rebekah Williams (acting) (until January 12)
  - vacant (January 12–14)
  - Eva Aariak
- Commissioner of Yukon – Angélique Bernard

==== Premiers ====
- Premier of Northwest Territories – Caroline Cochrane
- Premier of Nunavut – Joe Savikataaq (until November 19), then P. J. Akeeagok
- Premier of Yukon – Sandy Silver

== Events ==
=== January ===
- December 25, 2020 – January 5, 2021 – 2021 World Junior Ice Hockey Championships in Edmonton, Alberta.
- January 12 – 2021 Canadian cabinet reshuffle.
- January 22 – Julie Payette resigns as Governor General in the wake of the 2020–2021 Rideau Hall workplace review.

=== February ===
- February 6 – 2021 Nova Scotia Liberal Party leadership election is held. Iain Rankin is elected on second ballot.
- February 17 – Canadian Nationalist Party leader Travis Patron was arrested by the RCMP and charged with wilful promotion of hate in connection to the complaint.

=== March ===
- March 20 – At the Conservative Party of Canada March 2021 policy convention, delegates voted 54%-46% to reject a proposal expand the party's existing climate change policies to include a statement that climate change is real, proclaim that Conservatives were "willing to act" on the issue, and calling for more innovation in green tech.
- March 25 – 2021 Newfoundland and Labrador general election is held, resulting in a majority government for the Liberals.
- March 27 – A man stabbed multiple people in North Vancouver, British Columbia. One was killed. The man was arrested.

=== April ===
- April 4 – Canada's first confirmed case of the SARS-CoV-2 Delta variant.
- April 12 – 2021 Yukon general election is held, resulting in a minority government for the Liberals, who are given support in the legislature (from April 28), by the New Democrats.
- April 17 – 2021 Conservative Party of Quebec leadership election is held. Eric Duhaime is elected on the first and only ballot.

=== May ===
- May 11 – 2021 Canadian census.
- May 12 – The CAQ Quebec government of François Legault announces Bill 96, which will strengthen Bill 101, the French language in Quebec.
- May 15 – Demonstrations are held across Canada amid the 2021 Israel–Palestine crisis.
- May 28 – The New York Times breaks the story on a Canadian Indian Residential School Cemeteries announcement, incorrectly reporting a discovery of "mass graves" of Indigenous children at a former school site. The reporting would help "spawn a new holiday, Truth and Reconciliation Day, prompt an official visit by Pope Francis, and result in Canadian flags being kept at half-mast for a record-breaking five consecutive months.”
- May 31 – The Montreal Canadiens defeat the Toronto Maple Leafs 3–1 in Game 7 of their first round series to complete the comeback from a 3–1 series deficit. An average of 7.31 million Canadians watched the game, making it the second most watched NHL game in the nation's history and the 18th most watched broadcast all-time.

=== June ===
- June 6
  - Juno Awards of 2021.
  - A man intentionally rammed his vehicle into a family of five Muslims in London, Ontario. Four were killed and one was severely injured. The man was arrested.
- June 7 – The Montreal Canadiens advance to the semifinals of the Stanley Cup playoffs for the first time since 2014 after Tyler Toffoli scored the overtime winner to sweep the Winnipeg Jets.
- June 21 – The Government of Canada announces the first phase to easing the COVID-19 border measures for travellers, thus lifting quarantine requirements for fully immunised travellers starting on July 5, at 11:59 p.m. EDT. The quarantine exemption is only available to fully vaccinated people, who had gotten a combination of either of the following vaccines: Pfizer, Moderna, AstraZeneca or Janssen, at least two weeks prior to entering the Canadian border.
- June 24
  - 2021 Canadian Indian residential schools cemeteries: 751 potential unmarked graves are found on the site of Marieval Indian Residential School in Saskatchewan.
  - The Montreal Canadiens advance to the Stanley Cup Finals for the first time since 1993 after Artturi Lehkonen scored the overtime winner to eliminate the Vegas Golden Knights in six games. The Canadiens became the first Canadian based team to advance to the Finals since the Vancouver Canucks ten years ago, and their 1993 win was the last time a Canadian-based team won the cup. The Canadiens also won the Clarence S. Campbell Bowl for the first time in their history.
- June 29 – Lytton, British Columbia breaks the all-time record high temperature in Canada, recording a high of 49.6 °C (121.3 °F), after previously breaking the national record the prior two days as well.
- June 30
  - 2021 Western North America heat wave: Dozens of people have died amid an unprecedented heatwave that has smashed temperature records.
  - Canadian Indian residential schools gravesite cemeteries: 182 potential unmarked graves are detected on the site of Kootenay Indian Residential School near Cranbrook, British Columbia.
  - A wildfire sweeps through Lytton, British Columbia, destroying approximately 90% of the village and leaving at least two dead.

=== July ===
- July 1 – Canadian Indian residential schools cemeteries: Canada Day marked by many across the nation as a day of reflection and mourning for Indigenous communities following the detection of more than 1000 potential unmarked graves at former residential schools in British Columbia and Saskatchewan over the past month.
- July 7 – The Montreal Canadiens lose the Stanley Cup to the defending champions Tampa Bay Lightning following a 1–0 loss in Game 5 of the 2021 Stanley Cup Finals.
- July 12 – A crane collapse in Kelowna, British Columbia, kills five people.
- July 17 – Toronto FC plays their first home game against Orlando City SC at BMO Field, marking the first MLS game played in Canada during the 2021 season.
- July 20 – British Columbia declares a state of emergency in response to the 2021 British Columbia wildfires.
- July 26 – Mary Simon is sworn in as Canada's 30th Governor General. She is the first Indigenous person to hold the office.
- July 30 – The Toronto Blue Jays played their first home game at the Rogers Centre since 2019. They played against the Kansas City Royals. This was the first MLB game played in Canada during the 2021 season after travel restrictions along the Canada–United States border were lifted. The Jays won the game.
- July 31 – Swimmer Penny Oleksiak becomes the most decorated Canadian Olympian of all-time after she wins her seventh overall Olympic medal - a bronze in the women's 4 × 100 metre medley relay at the 2020 Summer Olympics.

=== August ===
- August 2 – SARS-CoV-2 Delta variant becomes the pre-dominant strain of COVID-19 in Canada.
- August 5
  - The White Rock Lake fire destroys much of Monte Lake, British Columbia.
  - Little Canada, a tourist attraction containing miniature models, opens in downtown Toronto.
- August 17 – 2021 Nova Scotia general election is held, resulting in a majority government for the Progressive Conservatives.

=== September ===
- September 7 – A Radio-Canada article reveals that 5,000 books were burned and buried from 30 French-language school libraries of Southwestern Ontario in a "flame purification" ceremony of 2019 held by the Conseil scolaire catholique Providence over depicting racist stereotypes of Indigenous peoples of the Americas. Prime Minister Justin Trudeau reacts to the book burning, stating that he disagrees with it on a personal level and that it is not up to non-Indigenous people to tell Indigenous people how to feel or act on advancing active reconciliation. Quebec Premier François Legault called the act atrocious.
- September 9–18 – 2021 Toronto International Film Festival.
- September 13 – Raghu Venugopal M.D. holds a one-person counter-protest next to an anti-vaccination event outside Toronto General Hospital, calling protests "un-Canadian" and "unacceptable"; Justin Trudeau announces he will criminalize blocking access to hospitals.
- September 14 –The Quebec legislature would unanimously condemn a debate question as "Quebec-bashing."
- September 20 – 2021 Canadian federal election is held, with the Liberal Party forming another minority government.
- September 25
  - Michael Spavor and Michael Kovrig arrive in Canada after being detained in China for nearly three years. They were released when the extradition case against Meng Wanzhou was dropped on September 24.
  - The Toronto Maple Leafs played the Montreal Canadiens at home in the Scotiabank Arena with fans for the first time in over a year, a preseason game. The Leafs won.
- September 27 – The Green Party leader, Annamie Paul, announces her intention to resign as the leader of the Green Party, after the disappointing election results and leadership problems.
- September 30 – A new national holiday, National Day for Truth and Reconciliation, is held to remember lives lost at residential schools.

=== October ===
- October 4 – The Toronto Raptors played their first home game at the Scotiabank Arena in over a year against the Philadelphia 76ers, a preseason game. The Raptors won.
- October 18 – 2021 Alberta municipal elections are held.
- October 25 – 2021 Nunavut general election is held.

=== November ===
- November 14 – Unprecedented rain caused by an atmospheric river bring a series of floods to southern British Columbia.
- November 15 – Parts of Abbotsford and the entire city of Merritt, British Columbia are evacuated due to flooding. Many highways and rail lines are closed in the Lower Mainland and on Vancouver Island, cutting off land access to Greater Vancouver from the rest of Canada and Greater Victoria to the rest of Vancouver Island.
- November 24 – Amita Kuttner is appointed as interim leader of the Green Party of Canada, becoming the youngest person, first transgender person, and first person of East Asian heritage to lead a federal political party.
- November 28 – The Ontario Ministry of Health confirms the first case of COVID-19 Omicron variant in Canada.

=== December ===
- December 6 – Canadian Ministry of Health reports that Deltacron hybrid variant is now pre-dominant strain in Canada, which is combined with Delta and Omicron variants, accounting for three-quarters of cases.
- December 12 – The Winnipeg Blue Bombers win the Grey Cup in Hamilton.

=== Events cancelled as a result of the COVID-19 pandemic ===
- 2021 U Sports Women's Basketball Championship at Queen's University in Kingston, Ontario
- 2021 U Sports Men's Basketball Championship at St. Francis Xavier University in Halifax, Nova Scotia
- 2021 Toronto International Boat Show
- Toronto St Patrick's Day Parade
- All national championships in five-pin bowling including C5PBA, Youth Bowl Canada and the Master Bowlers.
- All Country Thunder events
- Canadian National Exhibition and the air show
- Honda Indy Toronto
- The 2021 Royal Agricultural Winter Fair

== Deaths ==
=== January ===
- January 1
  - Paul Delorey, curler and politician (b. 1949)
  - Thomas Symons, professor and writer (b. 1929)
- January 2 – Rob Flockhart, ice hockey player (b. 1956)
- January 4
  - Laurent Mailhot, historian and writer (b. 1931)
  - John Muckler, NHL executive and coach (b. 1934)
- January 6
  - James Cross, British diplomat kidnapped by the Front de libération du Québec (FLQ) (b. 1921)
  - Gord Renwick, ice hockey administrator (b. 1935)
- January 8
  - Michael Fonfara, keyboardist (b. 1946)
  - Jay W. McGee, American-born musician (b. 1950)
- January 9
  - Margaret Morrison, philosopher (b. 1954)
  - George Robertson, ice hockey player (b. 1927)
  - Philip Seeman, neuropharmacologist (b. 1934)
  - Kathy Shaidle, writer (b. 1964)
- January 10 – Louis-Pierre Bougie, painter and printmaker (b. 1946)
- January 11 – Kathleen Heddle, Olympic rower (b. 1965)
- January 12
  - Bruce Bennett, gridiron football player (b. 1944)
  - Shingoose, folk musician (b. 1946)
- January 13
  - Michel Gravel, photographer (b. 1936)
  - Norman MacLeod, businessman and politician (b. 1927)
- January 16 – Steve Molnar, gridiron football player (b. 1947)
- January 17 – Camille Cléroux, serial killer (b. 1954)
- January 20 – Wayne Roberts, food analyst (b. 1944)
- January 24
  - George Armstrong, ice hockey player (b. 1930)
  - Barbara Sullivan, politician (b. 1943)
- January 26 – Constance Isherwood, lawyer (b. 1920)
- January 28 – Rod Boll, Olympic sports shooter (b. 1952)
- January 29 – Christian Daigle, ice hockey agent (b. 1978)
- January 31 – Pierre-Paul Savoie, choreographer and dancer (b. 1955)

=== February ===
- February 1
  - Umberto Bruni, artist (b. 1914)
  - Rachna Gilmore, children's writer (b. 1953)
  - Mark Jensen, luger (b. 1960)
  - Charlotte L'Écuyer, politician (b. 1943)
  - Jacqueline Shumiatcher, philanthropist (b. 1923)
- February 2 – Charan Gill, social activist (b. 1936)
- February 3
  - Art Jones, ice hockey player (b. 1935)
  - Barry Pashak, politician (b. 1937)
  - Régine Robin, historian and novelist (b. 1939)
  - Henry Tarvainen, actor and theatre director (b. 1944/45)
- February 4
  - Robert Dean, politician and unionist (b. 1927)
  - Robert Labine, politician (b. 1940)
- February 5
  - Jules Bélanger, professor (b. 1929)
  - Christopher Plummer, actor (b. 1929)
- February 6 – James Eayrs, historian (b. 1926)
- February 7
  - Ralph Backstrom, ice hockey player (b. 1937)
  - John Mullally, politician (b. 1930)
  - Clayton Pachal, ice hockey player (b. 1956)
  - Jackie Vautour, fisherman and activist (b. 1930)
- February 8 – Roland Berthiaume, caricaturist (b. 1927)
- February 12 – Marcia Diamond, actress (b. 1925)
- February 13 – Frank Orr, sports journalist (b. 1936)
- February 15
  - Andreas Apostolopoulos, real estate developer (b. 1952)
  - Raymond Lévesque, singer-songwriter and poet (b. 1928)
  - Eva Maria Pracht, Olympic equestrian (b. 1937)
- February 16
  - Don Dietrich, ice hockey player (b. 1961)
  - Wayne Giardino, gridiron football player (b. 1943)
- February 18 – Jack Vivian, ice hockey coach (b. 1941)
- February 19 – Jocelyn Hardy, ice hockey player (b. 1945)
- February 20 – Charlotte Fielden, writer and actress (b. 1932)
- February 21 – Geoffrey Ursell, writer (b. 1943)
- February 22 – Jack Whyte, writer (b. 1940)
- February 23
  - Gary Inness, ice hockey player (b. 1949)
  - Yves Martin, sociologist (b. 1929)
  - Gord Miller, politician (b. 1924)
- February 25 – Maurice Tanguay, businessman (b. 1933)
- February 26
  - Ronald Gillespie, chemist (b. 1924)
  - Irving Grundman, ice hockey general manager (b. 1928)
  - Janice Sarich, provincial politician from Alberta (b. 1958)
- February 28 – Ty Lund, politician (b. 1938)

=== March ===
- March 1
  - Jahmil French, actor (b. 1991)
  - David Searle, politician (b. 1936)
- March 2 – Jim Hodder, politician (b. 1940)
- March 4
  - Walter Gretzky, ice hockey coach (b. 1938)
  - Donald Kinney, politician (b. 1957)
  - Chris Schultz, gridiron football player (b. 1960)
- March 7 – Paul Devlin, curler (b. 1946)
- March 8 – Rhéal Cormier, baseball player (b. 1967)
- March 11 – Archie Lang, politician (b. 1948)
- March 13 – Bob McPhee, arts administrator (b. 1956)
- March 14 – Ray Cullen, ice hockey player (b. 1941)
- March 15 – Ian Waddell, politician (b. 1942)
- March 19
  - Ludwig Heimrath Sr., race car driver (b. 1934)
  - Budge Wilson, writer (b. 1927)
- March 21 – Bob McKnight, ice hockey player (b. 1938)
- March 22 – Swede Knox, ice hockey referee (b. 1948)
- March 23 – John Ridpath, intellectual historian (b. 1936)
- March 24 – Bob Plager, ice hockey player (b. 1943)
- March 26 – Carole Lavallée, politician (b. 1954)
- March 27
  - Todd Kabel, jockey (b. 1965)
  - Keith MacDonald, politician (b. 1927)
  - Michelle Ross, drag queen (b. 1954)
- March 28
  - Marisa Ferretti Barth, politician (b. 1931)
  - Neil Merryweather, musician (b. 1945)
  - Bobby Schmautz, ice hockey player (b. 1945)
  - Neil Windsor, engineer and politician (b. 1945)
- March 30 – Guy Lelièvre, politician (b. 1952)

=== April ===
- April 4
  - Paul Humphrey, musician (b. 1959 or 1960)
  - Henri Lemay, politician (b. 1939)
  - Robert Mundell, economist (b. 1932)
- April 5 – Tom Gibney, television journalist (b. 1936 or 1937)
- April 6
  - Kittie Bruneau, painter (b. 1929)
  - Lily Oddie, politician (b. 1937)
  - Louis Siminovitch, molecular biologist (b. 1920)
- April 9
  - Michel Girouard, journalist (b. 1944)
  - Ross Young, politician (b. 1962)
- April 11
  - Normand Cherry, politician (b. 1938)
  - Colombe Pelletier, pianist, coach and accompanist (b. 1923)
  - Alix Renaud, writer (b. 1945)
- April 12
  - Michel Noël, writer (b. 1944)
  - Galen Weston, businessman (b. 1940)
- April 14
  - Michel Louvain, singer (b. 1937)
  - Bob Maskell, politician (b. 1940)
  - Roger Soloman, educator and politician (b. 1939)
- April 15 – Clotilda Douglas-Yakimchuk, nurse (b. 1932)
- April 16
  - Bob Hodges, speed skater (b. 1943)
  - Johnny Peirson, ice hockey player and broadcaster (b. 1925)
- April 18 – Douglas Bell, politician (b. 1926)
- April 19 – Bob Lanois, sound engineer, music producer, and harmonica player (b. 1947 or 1948)
- April 21
  - Stanley A. Milner, businessman and politician (b. 1930)
  - Margaret Pokiak-Fenton, writer (b. 1936)
- April 22 – Sharon Pollock, playwright, director, and actress (b. 1936)
- April 24
  - Kent Angus, businessman (b. 1952)
  - Katherine Barber, lexicographer (b. 1959)
  - Byron Seaman, businessman and part owner of the Calgary Flames (b. 1923)
- April 27 – Jean-Guy Pilon, poet (b. 1930)
- April 28
  - Thomas R. Berger, politician and jurist (b. 1933)
  - Claude Jasmin, journalist, broadcaster, and writer (b. 1930)
- April 30 – Hugh Coflin, ice hockey player (b. 1928)

=== May ===
- May 1 – Nancy McCredie, Olympic athlete (b. 1945)
- May 3
  - Aurélien Boisvert, historian (b. 1927)
  - Donald Cameron, politician and 22nd Premier of Nova Scotia (b. 1946)
- May 4 – Jim Johnson, ice hockey player (b. 1942)
- May 8
  - Graeme Ferguson, filmmaker and inventor who co-invented IMAX (b. 1929)
  - Jean-Luc Phaneuf, ice hockey player (b. 1955)
- May 10 – Serge Bouchard, anthropologist (b. 1947)
- May 11 – Bernard Lachance, singer-songwriter (b. 1974)
- May 14
  - Barry Fry, curler (b. 1939)
- May 15 – George Little, teacher and politician (b. 1937)
- May 18
  - John Gomery, jurist (b. 1932)
  - Gilles Lupien, ice hockey player (b. 1954)
- May 22 – Cornelia Oberlander, landscape architect (b. 1921)
- May 24 – Hazen Myers, politician (b. 1934)
- May 26
  - Murray Dowey, ice hockey player and Olympic champion (b. 1926)
  - Paul Soles, actor and television personality (b. 1930)
- May 30 – George Tintor, rower (b. 1957)

=== June ===
- June 1 – Jacques Lacoursière, historian and television host (b. 1932)
- June 5 – George Murphy, politician (b. 1963)
- June 7 – Laszlo George, cinematographer (b. 1931)
- June 9 – Jon Hameister-Ries, football player (b. 1984)
- June 11 – Kay Hawtrey, actress (b. 1926)
- June 13 – Maurice Joncas, writer (b. 1936)
- June 15
  - Howie Glover, ice hockey player (b. 1935)
  - Tim Thorney, guitarist, songwriter, and record producer (b. 1955)
- June 21 – Warren Barker, broadcaster (b. 1928)
- June 20 – Jeanne Lamon, violinist and conductor (b. 1949)
- June 22 – René Robert, ice hockey player (b. 1948)
- June 23
  - Melissa Coates, professional wrestler, bodybuilder, fitness model, and actress (b. 1971)
  - Ellen McIlwaine, singer-songwriter (b. 1945)
- June 27
  - Reuven Bulka, rabbi, writer, broadcaster, and activist (b. 1944)
  - Jean-Claude Dionne, geographer and geomorphologist (b. 1935)
- June 29
  - Fintan Aylward, politician (b. 1928)
  - Norman Lowe, ice hockey player (b. 1928)

=== July ===
- July 2
  - Naïm Kattan, writer (b. 1928)
  - Jeffrey Northrup, police officer (b. 1966)
- July 4 – Raymond Brousseau, film director, screenwriter, art collector, and artist (b. 1938)
- July 6 – Harold Kalant, pharmacologist and physician (b. 1923)
- July 7
  - Michael Soles, football player (b. 1966)
  - William Stevenson, judge (b. 1934)
  - Paul C. Weiler, legal scholar (b. 1939)
- July 8
  - Paul Birckel, businessman and Chief of the Champagne and Aishihik First Nations (b. 1938)
  - Bryan Watson, ice hockey player (b. 1942)
- July 15 – Judith Keating, senator, provincial civil servant, and lawyer (b. 1957)
- July 17 – Dolores Claman, composer and pianist (b. 1927)
- July 19 – Bruce Kirby, sailboat designer, journalist, and dinghy and offshore racer (b. 1929)
- July 20
  - Chuck McMann, football player and coach (b. 1951)
  - Raymond Savard, politician and Mayor of Verdun, Quebec (b. 1927)
- July 21 – Jack Cable, politician (b. 1934)
- July 22 – Michèle Lalonde, playwright and poet (b. 1937)
- July 23 – Peter Trueman, journalist and news presenter (b. 1934)
- July 24
  - Kenzie MacNeil, songwriter, performer, producer and television, film, radio and stage director (b. 1952)
  - Alfie Scopp, English-born actor (b. 1919)
- July 25 – Doug Falconer, film producer, singer-songwriter, recording artist, and football player (b. 1952)
- July 27 – Jerry Pickard, politician (b. 1940)
- July 31 – Angela Bailey, track and field athlete (b. 1962)

=== August ===
- August 1 – David A. Gall, Thoroughbred horse racing jockey (b. 1941)
- August 3 – Jocelyne Bourassa, golfer (b. 1947)
- August 8
  - Ken Clark, gridiron football player (b. 1948)
  - Bill Davis, politician and 18th Premier of Ontario (b. 1929)
  - Paul Hellyer, engineer, politician, writer, and commentator (b. 1923)
  - Garry Kennedy, conceptual artist and educator (b. 1935)
- August 9 – Gord Cruickshank, ice hockey player (b. 1965)
- August 10 – Tony Esposito, ice hockey player and executive (b. 1943)
- August 14
  - Robin Hahn, equestrian (b. 1933)
  - R. Murray Schafer, composer, writer, music educator, and environmentalist (b. 1933)
- August 17
  - Rock Demers, film producer (b. 1933)
  - Yvon Duhamel, motorcycle racer (b. 1939)
  - Jack Lamb, football player (b. 1935)
- August 19 – Rod Gilbert, ice hockey player (b. 1941)
- August 21 – Nick Volpe, football player (b. 1926)
- August 23 – Terry Driver, murderer (b. 1965)
- August 26 – Jérôme Proulx, politician (b. 1930)
- August 28 – Jacques Drouin, film director, animator, and editor (b. 1943)

=== September ===
- September 3 – Henriette Valium, comic book artist and painter (b. 1959)
- September 4 – Mort Ransen, film and television director and screenwriter (b. 1933)
- September 6 – Severian Yakymyshyn, Ukrainian Greek Catholic hierarch (b. 1930)
- September 9 – Jean-Paul Jeannotte, operatic tenor, teacher, and opera administrator (b. 1926)
- September 10 – Jack Egers, ice hockey player (b. 1949)
- September 11 – Catherine Sheldrick Ross, professor and dean of the Faculty of Information and Media Studies at the University of Western Ontario (b. 1945)
- September 13 – Fred Stanfield, ice hockey player (b. 1944)
- September 14 – Norm Macdonald, stand-up comedian, writer, and actor (b. 1959)
- September 15 – Lou Angotti, ice hockey player and coach (b. 1938)
- September 19 – Allan Slaight, rock and roll radio pioneer, media mogul, and philanthropist (b. 1931)
- September 20 – Marcia H. Rioux, legal scholar (b. 1947)
- September 21 – Rae German, football player (b. 1940)
- September 26 – Ann Breault, teacher, nurse, journalist, and politician (b. 1938)
- September 27 – Fernande Chiocchio, mezzo-soprano, pianist and teacher (b. 1929)
- September 28 – Ed Mason, newscaster (b. 1946 or 1945)
- September 30 – Philip Owen, politician and 36th Mayor of Vancouver (b. 1933)

=== October ===
- October 3 – Neil Hawryliw, ice hockey player (b. 1955)
- October 4
  - Roger Stuart Bacon, politician and 21st Premier of Nova Scotia (b. 1926)
  - John Paul Harney, academic and politician (b. 1931)
  - Peter Jenkins, politician (b. 1944)
- October 5
  - Nadia Chaudhri, psychologist (b. 1978)
  - Pierre Légaré, humorist (b. 1949)
- October 7
  - Clement Bowman, chemical engineer and the founding chairperson of the Alberta Oil Sands Technology and Research Authority (b. 1930)
  - Ray Charambura, gridiron football player (b. 1928)
  - Rick Jones, television presenter and musician (b. 1937)
  - Reggie Parks, professional wrestler and engraver (b. 1934)
  - Peter Silverman, broadcast journalist (b. 1931)
  - Ronald S. Stroud, historian, academic, archeologist, and epigraphist (b. 1933)
- October 8 – Jim McInally, ice hockey player (b. 1948)
- October 12 – Brian Boudreau, politician (b. 1954)
- October 14
  - Clint Dunford, politician (b. 1943)
  - Raymond Setlakwe, entrepreneur, lawyer, and senator (b. 1928)
- October 16
  - Leo Boivin, ice hockey player and coach (b. 1932)
  - Roger Hui, computer scientist (b. 1953)
  - Jean Rochon, politician and member of the National Assembly of Quebec (b. 1938)
- October 19
  - Michel Nadeau, administrator and journalist (b. 1947)
  - Gary Summerhays, boxer (b. 1950)
- October 20 – Robert H. MacQuarrie, politician and teacher (b. 1935)
- October 21 – Martha Henry, American-born actress (b. 1938)
- October 22 – Adolfo J. de Bold, cardiovascular researcher (b. 1942)
- October 25 – Paul D. House, businessman (b. 1943)
- October 26 – Isabel Turner, British-born politician and Mayor of Kingston, Ontario (b. 1936)
- October 28
  - Raymond Guy LeBlanc, musician and poet (b. 1945)
  - Jim Pollock, politician (b. 1930)
- October 30 – Tony Featherstone, ice hockey player (b. 1949)
- October 31 – Michel Robidoux, musician (b. 1943)

=== November ===
- November 4 – June Lindsey, English-born biochemist (b. 1922)
- November 5 – Charlie Burns, American-born ice hockey player (b. 1936)
- November 6 – Peter Aykroyd, actor, comedian, and writer (b. 1955)
- November 11
  - Lee Maracle, Sto꞉lo writer and academic (b. 1950)
  - Phyllis Webb, poet and radio broadcaster (b. 1927)
- November 13 – David Fox, actor (b. 1941)
- November 14 – Pierre Reid, politician, educator, and member of the National Assembly of Quebec (b. 1948)
- November 17 – Tom Colley, ice hockey player (b. 1953)
- November 18 – Richard Goldbloom, pediatrician, university professor, and the fifth chancellor of Dalhousie University (b. 1924)
- November 19 – Norman Webster, journalist and an editor-in-chief of The Globe and Mail and The Gazette (b. 1941)
- November 20
  - Josée Forest-Niesing, lawyer and politician (b. 1964)
  - Rita Letendre, painter, muralist, and printmaker (b. 1928)
- November 23 – Rosalie Trombley, music director of the radio station CKLW (b. 1939 or 1938)
- November 29 – Bob Kilger, politician (b. 1944)
- November 30 – Marie-Claire Blais, writer, novelist, poet, and playwright (b. 1939)

=== December ===
- December 1 – Abla Farhoud, Lebanese-born writer (b. 1945)
- December 4 – Hans Blohm, German-born photographer and author (b. 1927)
- December 5 – Harry Giles, educator and founder of the Toronto French School and the Giles School (b. 1930)
- December 9 – Danielle Adams, politician (b. 1982)
- December 10
  - Les Emmerson, musician (b. 1944)
  - Maria Gomori, Hungarian-born pioneer in the field of systems family therapy (b. 1920)
- December 11 – Mel Lastman, businessman, politician, and 62nd Mayor of Toronto (b. 1933)
- December 12 – Len Thornson, ice hockey player (b. 1933)
- December 13 – Pete Petcoff, football player (b. 1932)
- December 14 – Bob Peters, ice hockey coach (b. 1937)
- December 15 – Huguette Lachapelle, politician (b. 1942)
- December 16
  - Bill Mahoney, ice hockey coach (b. 1939)
  - Bob Speller, politician and Minister of Agriculture and Agri-Food (b. 1956)
- December 18 – Renée Martel, country singer (b. 1947)
- December 19
  - Gérard Poirier, actor (b. 1930)
  - Curt Ridley, ice hockey player (b. 1951)
- December 20 – Christopher Newton, actor and director (b. 1936)
- December 21 – Christian Ouellet, politician (b. 1934)
- December 23
  - Ted Byfield, journalist, publisher, and editor (b. 1928)
  - Bob McCammon, ice hockey player, head coach, and general manager (b. 1941)
- December 25
  - Candy Palmater, comedian, actress, and broadcaster (b. 1968)
  - Jean-Marc Vallée, film and television director, producer, and editor (b. 1963)
- December 26 – Jim Wiley, ice hockey player (b. 1950)
- December 27 – Howard Fredeen, animal breeding researcher (b. 1921)
- December 30 – Richard Patten, politician (b. 1942)
- December 31 – Joe Comuzzi, politician (b. 1933)

=== Full date unknown ===
- June – Andy Wells, politician (b. c. 1945)

== See also ==
- 2021 in Canadian television
- List of Canadian films of 2021
