= Joncas =

Joncas may refer to:

== People ==
- Grace Joncas (1923–2024), American politician
- Jean-Luc Joncas (born 1936), businessman and politician
- Louis-Zéphirin Joncas (1846-1903), Canadian politician
- Maurice Joncas (1936-2021), Canadian writer
- Maxime Blanchette-Joncas (born 1989), Canadian politician
- Michael Joncas (born 1951), Catholic priest

== Other ==
- Joncas River, a disambiguation page
