= Vancouver attack =

Vancouver attack may refer to:

- 1915 Vancouver bridge arson attack
- 2021 North Vancouver stabbing
- 2025 Vancouver car attack
