= 2021 British Columbia wildfires =

Series of wildfires in 2021

- Satellite imagery showing wildfires in British Columbia producing pyrocumulonimbus clouds spawning lightning strikes.
- Date: Evacuations: 19th April 2021
- Location: British Columbia, Canada

Statistics
- Land use: Forest and residential

Impacts
- Deaths: 2
- Injuries: Several
- Structures destroyed: Unknown, Estimated 90% of Lytton, British Columbia destroyed in Lytton Creek fire, Village of Monte Lake destroyed and Paxton Valley destroyed
- Cost: Unknown

Ignition
- Cause: Lightning and Human-Caused

The 2021 British Columbia wildfires burned across the Canadian province of British Columbia. The wildfires burned an area of about 8,600 square kilometres. A wildfire destroyed most of the Village of Lytton and a nearby First Nation, taking two lives.

The BC Wildfire Service attributed the severity of the 2021 wildfire season to a combination of extreme heat, lower than normal rainfall, and "repeated severe thunderstorms and lightning events." These factors were exacerbated by human-caused climate change.

As of August 16, over 1,500 fires were recorded according to the BC Wildfire Service. The Sparks Lake Fire, the largest fire burning in the province, burned an estimated 959 square kilometres (95,980 hectares; 237,172 acres) in the Bonaparte Plateau northwest of the city of Kamloops.

== Development ==
A heat dome gripped the province of British Columbia, and much of Western North America, from June 25–30, 2021. This increased the risk of wildfires.

On June 30, the village of Lytton was evacuated due to a fire that destroyed most of its buildings. This fire grew to over 300 square miles (780 km^{2}) and sent people fleeing for their lives.

By July 1, 2021, almost 500 wildfires were burning across British Columbia. On July 20 the B.C. government declared a state of emergency.

== Wildfires ==
The following is a list of fires that burned more than 405 ha (1,000 acres), or produced significant structural damage or casualties. More up to date information is available using this interactive map; BC Wildfire Service Map

List of fires over 400 hectares (1,000 acres)
Name	Regional district	Hectares (acres)	Start date	Containment status	Notes	Ref
George Road Fire	Thompson-Nicola	5,017 ha (12,400 acres)	June 16	Being held	Human-caused	
Beatton River Fire	Peace River	3,400 ha (8,400 acres)	June 28	Under control	Lightning-caused	
Buckinghorse Fire	Peace River	6,398 ha (15,810 acres)	June 28	Under control	Lightning-caused	
Sparks Lake Fire	Thompson-Nicola	89,627 ha (221,470 acres)	June 28	Under control	Largest wildfire by area burned	
McKay Creek Fire	Squamish-Lillooet	44,964 ha (111,110 acres)	June 29	Under control	Suspected human-caused	
Minaker Fire	Peace River	2,856 ha (7,060 acres)	June 29	Under control	Lightning-caused	
Klawli Lake Fire	Bulkley-Nechako	6,231 ha (15,400 acres)	June 30	Under control	Lightning-caused	
Lytton Creek Fire	Thompson-Nicola	83,740 ha (206,900 acres)	June 30	Under control	Destroyed the village of Lytton; two confirmed casualties	
Mckinley Lake Fire	Cariboo	1,835 ha (4,530 acres)	June 30	Being held	Lightning-caused	
South of Canim Lake Fire	Cariboo	3,049 ha (7,530 acres)	June 30	Under control	Lightning-caused	
SW of Deka Lake Fire	Cariboo	650 ha (1,600 acres)	June 30	Under control	Lightning-caused	
Young Lake Fire	Thompson-Nicola	7,453 ha (18,420 acres)	June 30	Under control	Lightning-caused	
Chilako Fire	Bulkley-Nechako	1,451 ha (3,590 acres)	July 1	Under control	Lightning-caused	
Mount Porter Fire	Bulkley-Nechako	13,659 ha (33,750 acres)	July 1	Being held	Lightning-caused	
Succour Lake Fire	Cariboo	1,600 ha (4,000 acres)	July 1	Being held	Lightning-caused	
Tentfire Creek Fire	Peace River	3,148 ha (7,780 acres)	July 1	Being held	Lightning-caused	
Big Stick Lake Fire	Cariboo	7,195 ha (17,780 acres)	July 2	Under control		
Black Pine Fire	Peace River	16,314 ha (40,310 acres)	July 2	Under control	Lightning-caused	
Churn Creek Protected Area Fire	Thompson-Nicola	12,101 ha (29,900 acres)	July 2	Being held	Lightning-caused	
Cultus Creek Fire	Central Kootenay	2,665 ha (6,590 acres)	July 2	Being held	Lightning-caused	
Cutoff Creek Fire	Bulkley-Nechako	33,418 ha (82,580 acres)	July 2	Being held	Lightning-caused	
Hotnarko Creek Fire	Central Coast	1,500 ha (3,700 acres)	July 3	Being held	Lightning-caused	
Forres Mountain Fire	Peace River	8,700 ha (21,000 acres)	July 4	Under control	Lightning-caused	
Purdy Lake Fire	Cariboo	8,100 ha (20,000 acres)	July 5	Under control	Lightning-caused	
Bunting Road Fire	North Okanagan	5,204 ha (12,860 acres)	July 7	Being held		
Chief Louie Lake Fire	Bulkley-Nechako	20,750 ha (51,300 acres)	July 7	Being held	Lightning-caused	
Momich Lake Fire	Thompson-Nicola	17,049 ha (42,130 acres)	July 7	Under control		
Flat Lake Fire	Thompson-Nicola	74,194 ha (183,340 acres)	July 8	Under control	Lightning-caused	
Akokli Creek Fire	Central Kootenay	3,636 ha (8,980 acres)	July 9	Being held	Lightning-caused	
Embleton Mountain Fire	Thompson-Nicola	991 ha (2,450 acres)	July 9	Under control		
Hunakwa Lake Fire	Columbia-Shuswap	3,601 ha (8,900 acres)	July 9	Being held	Lightning-caused	
Mowhokam Creek Fire	Thompson-Nicola	5,097 ha (12,590 acres)	July 9	Being held	Lightning-caused	
Trozzo Creek Fire	Central Kootenay	5,992 ha (14,810 acres)	July 9	Under control	Lightning-caused	
Bill Nye Mountain Fire	East Kootenay	2,990 ha (7,400 acres)	July 10	Being held	Lightning-caused	
Crazy Creek Gorge FSR Fire	Columbia-Shuswap	4,389 ha (10,850 acres)	July 10	Being held	Lightning-caused	
Grizzly Lake Fire	Bulkley-Nechako	4,891 ha (12,090 acres)	July 10	Under control	Lightning-caused	
Michaud Creek Fire	Central Kootenay	14,032 ha (34,670 acres)	July 10	Being held	Lightning-caused	
Thomas Creek Fire	Okanagan-Similkameen	10,597 ha (26,190 acres)	July 11	Being held		
Three Valley Lake Fire	Columbia-Shuswap	498 ha (1,230 acres)	July 11	Under control		
Tremont Creek Fire	Thompson-Nicola	62,524 ha (154,500 acres)	July 12	Under control		
Chasm Fire	Thompson-Nicola	454 ha (1,120 acres)	July 13	Under control	Lightning-caused	
July Mountain Fire	Thompson-Nicola	19,080 ha (47,100 acres)	July 13	Being held	Lightning-caused; merged with Brook Creek Fire	
White Rock Lake Fire	Thompson-Nicola	81,483 ha (201,350 acres)	July 13	Being held	Lightning-caused. Destroyed the village of Monte Lake; part of the city of Kamloops placed under evacuation order, firefighter injured after falling several meters.	
Brenda Creek Fire	Central Okanagan	824 ha (2,040 acres)	July 14	Under control		
Octopus Creek Fire	Central Kootenay	22,049 ha (54,480 acres)	July 14	Being held	Lightning-caused	
Nk'Mip Creek Fire	Okanagan-Similkameen	19,335 ha (47,780 acres)	July 19	Being held		
Two Mile Road Fire	Columbia-Shuswap	2,455 ha (6,070 acres)	July 20	Being held		
Garrison Lake Fire	Okanagan-Similkameen	14,564 ha (35,990 acres)	July 23	Being held		
Pine River Fire	Peace River	2,542 ha (6,280 acres)	August 13	Being held		
Mt Law Fire	Okanagan-Similkameen	976 ha (2,410 acres)	August 15	Under control	Suspected human-caused. Parts of West Kelowna evacuated.	

== See also ==
- List of disasters in Canada
- 2021 Western North America heat wave
