= Monte Lake =

- Location within British Columbia
- Location: British Columbia, Canada
- Coordinates: 50°30′21″N 119°50′17″W
- Type: lake

Monte Lake is a small lake in southern British Columbia, Canada, between Kamloops and Vernon. The lake is adjacent to British Columbia Highway 97 in the valley connecting Falkland to the South Thompson Country at Monte Creek where that highway merges with the Trans-Canada Highway to Kamloops. The community of Monte Lake is at its north end, while along its eastern shore is the eight hectare Monte Lake Provincial Park.

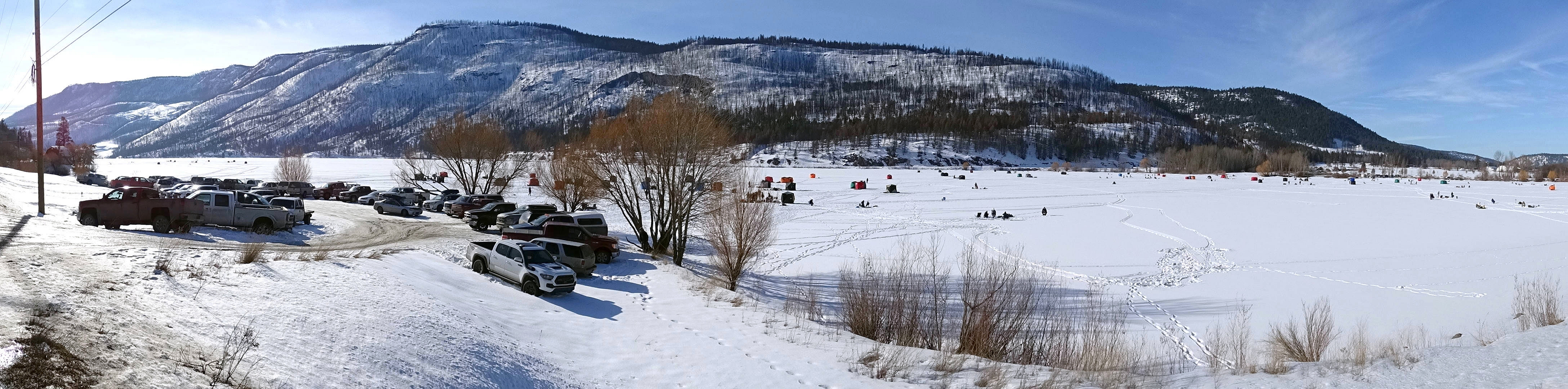
Ice fishing on Monte Lake

== See also ==
- List of lakes of British Columbia
