= Lytton wildfire =

2021 wildfire in Lytton, British Columbia

Lytton Creek Wildfire
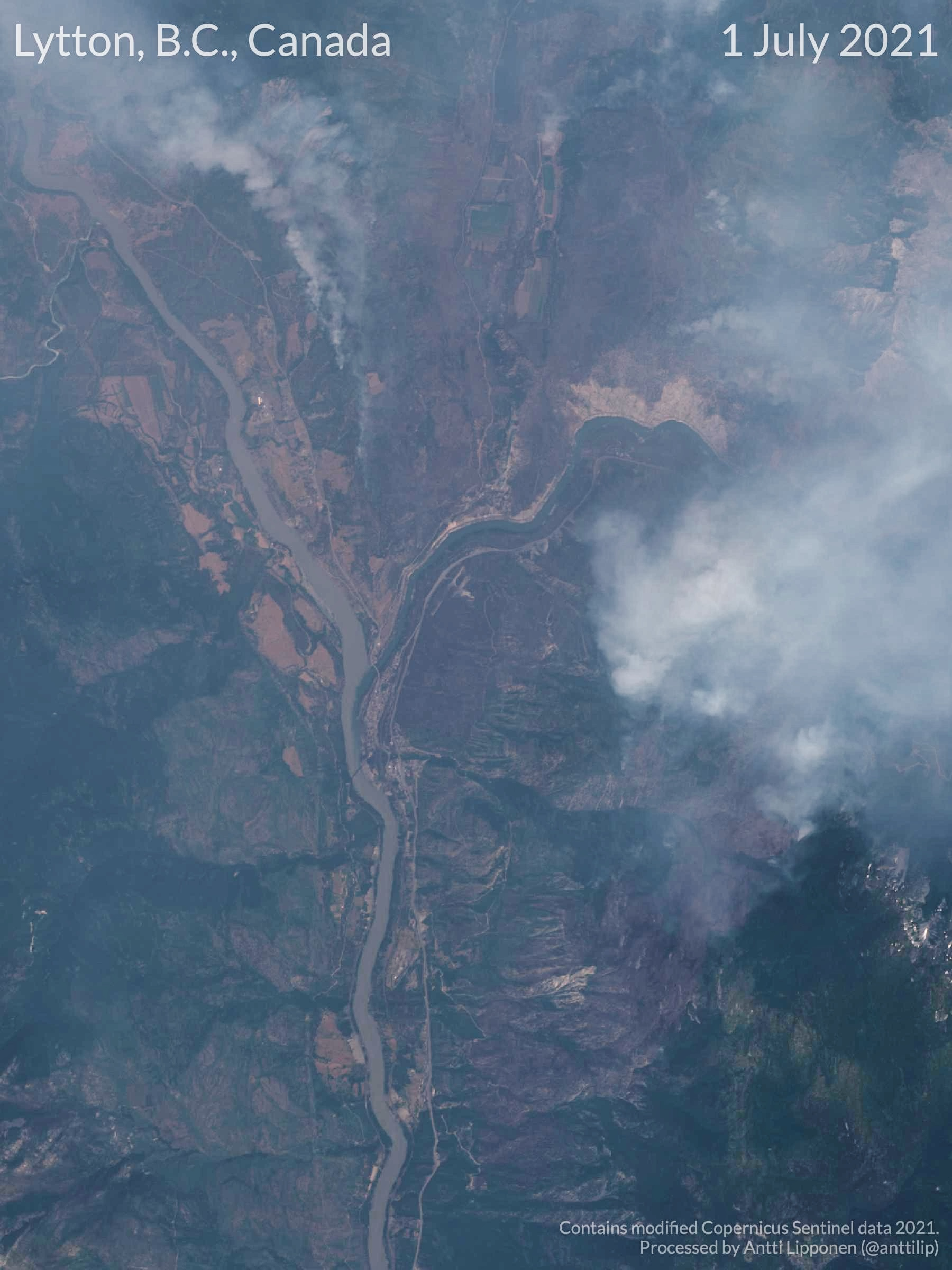
- Satellite imagery of Lytton, July 1, 2021
- Date: June 30, 2021
- Location: Lytton, British Columbia, Canada
- Coordinates: 50°13′52″N 121°34′53″W

Statistics
- Burned area: as of 19:00 PDT, Aug 29: 83,740 hectares 323 square miles 837 square kilometres 206,926 acres
- Land use: Residential, forest, agricultural

Impacts
- Deaths: 2 civilians
- Evacuated: 1,000+ residents
- Cost: $150 million (2021 USD)

Ignition
- Cause: Likely human-caused, officially undetermined

Map
- Location in British Columbia Location in Thompson-Nicola Regional District

A wildfire began on June 30, 2021 just south of the village of Lytton in the interior of British Columbia, Canada. The fire destroyed much of Lytton and caused two civilian fatalities, announced July 3. The lives of several missing residents were feared to be lost but they were later located alive. The Lytton fire was part of a wave of wildfires that hit the province that year, facilitated by that summer's heat wave.

At the time of the fire, Lytton had a population of about 250. Another 1,500 to 2,000 First Nations residents lived in nearby reserves.

== Overview ==
Lytton's wildfire started in the early evening of June 30, 2021. For several days the village had been sweltering under a record heat wave, including reaching 49.6 °C (121.3 °F) the previous day, the highest temperature ever recorded in Canada. Once started, winds of up to 71 kilometres per hour (44 mph) pushed the fire north into the village, perhaps as fast as 10 to 20 km/h. Volunteer firefighters tackled the fire, as the Royal Canadian Mounted Police (RCMP) began to evacuate residents in the fire's path.

As the fire advanced, it exploded propane tanks. Winds thwarted firefighting efforts by blowing hose water away from the fire. The fire swept through the village within minutes, forcing the hasty evacuation of its residents who had no time to collect belongings. Mayor Jan Polderman issued an evacuation order at 6:00 PM. Residents notified local shop owners and others of the impending danger so they could flee.

Lytton First Nation had an evacuation plan and quickly carried it out on short notice without assistance from provincial authorities.

Residents had the choice of three evacuation routes to flee the village:

1. northwest on Highway 12 to Lillooet,
2. north on the Trans-Canada Highway to Spence's Bridge then southeast to Merritt, and
3. north on the Trans-Canada Highway to Cache Creek, then east to Kamloops.

Both the Trans-Canada Highway and Highway 12 were closed to non-evacuee traffic minutes prior to Lytton's evacuation order being issued.

By July 2, the Tk’emlúps te Secwépemc (Kamloops First Nation) had opened their powwow grounds to assist First Nations members fleeing the fire.

== Damage ==
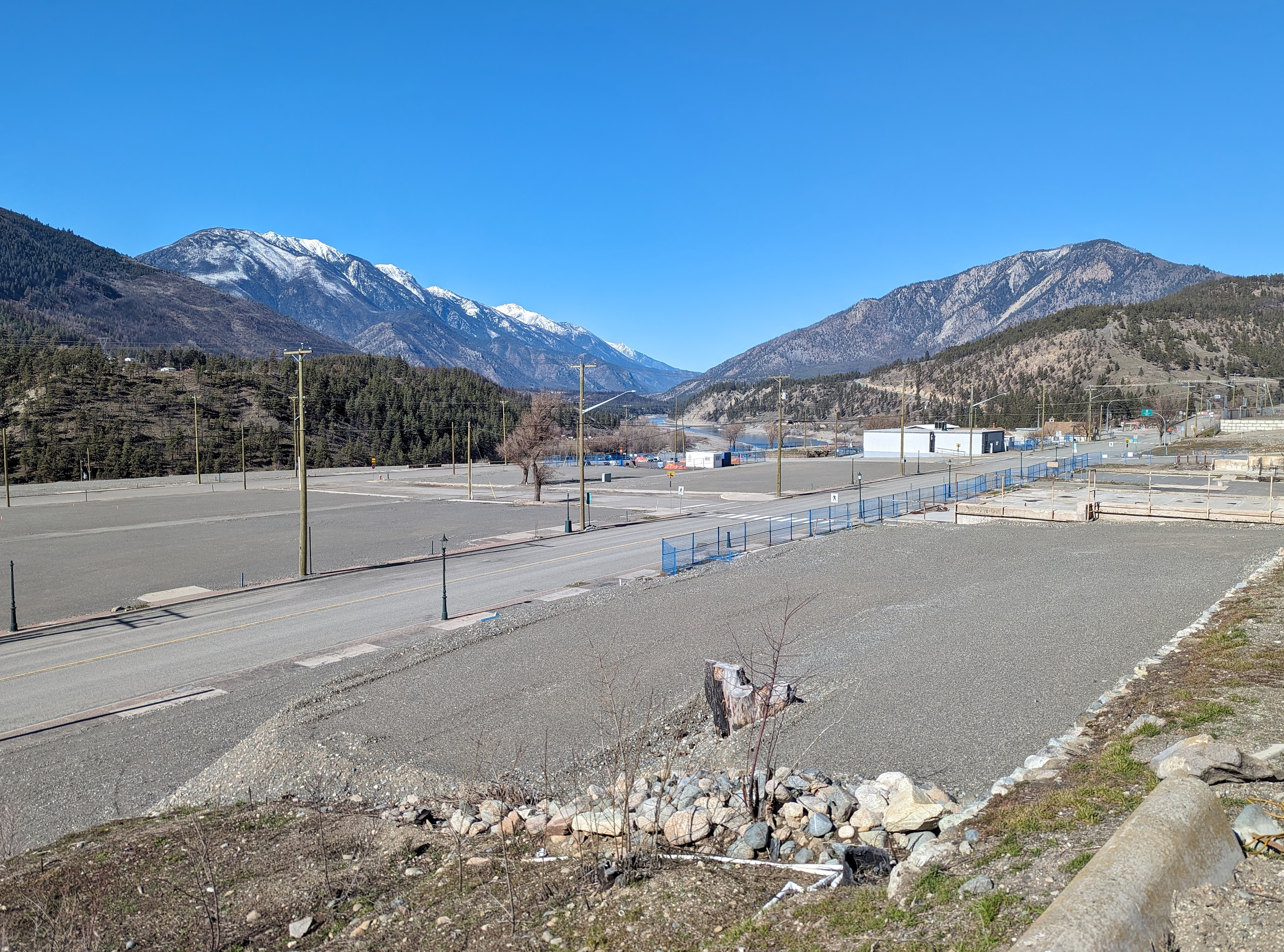
Downtown Lytton, photographed in March 2024

The fire destroyed 90 percent of the village, killed two people and forced the evacuation of nearby First Nations communities including Lytton First Nation.

On July 1, local MP Brad Vis made a Facebook post stating that there were reports of several injuries in addition to the two deaths.

Nearly every house within Lytton was destroyed. Some houses across the highway from the village were spared, but suffered cessation of electricity, sewer and water service.

The fire largely leveled Lytton's Main Street, burning the post office, ambulance station, health centre, RCMP detachment, Lytton Elementary School, Lytton Hotel, and the Lytton Village Office. The Lytton Chinese History Museum was lost, along with 1,600 artifacts, museum archives and library. Residents of the village and its surrounding area lost their homes. The railway and highway were also damaged. The Insurance Bureau of Canada reported $78 million of insured damage. St. Barnabas Anglican Church had minor damage but was not burned.

Some damage may be long term. Chemicals used to fight the fire may have contaminated the village's watershed, and ruined houses may cause toxic chemical exposure.

== Cause ==
As of October 2021, the cause of the wildfire was undetermined and disputed. The suspected causes were a lightning strike, train activity arson.

Several residents blamed the Canadian National Railway (CN) and its mainline through the community, "saying that they saw sparks coming from a passing train at the same time the fire started."

Some local Indigenous leaders said sparks from a passing train might have started the fire. Chief Matt Pasco, chair of the Nlaka'pamux Nation Tribal Council said "I'm not going to speak on what caused the (latest) fire but I can say there are a lot of fires in the canyon caused by rail service. A lot." The Nlaka'pamux Nation Tribal Council (NNTC) is a tribal association of three of the five First Nations that were affected by the fire. Lytton First Nation is affiliated with the NNTC but directly provides and administers all services to its members.

Investigations began, by the RCMP and the Transportation Safety Board (TSB). Railways are required to inform the TSB of any fires along their rail lines, and the TSB received no such report. The BC Wildfire Service said the fire appeared to have been caused by humans rather than lightning, but did not specify a cause.

The TSB opened an investigation into whether a train had caused the Lytton wildfire. In 2020, Canadian National Railway CN lost an appeal and had to pay $16 million in costs and penalties for causing the Cisco Road fire 10km south of Lytton in June 2015. An investigation of the Cisco fire concluded that rail workers cutting a line, at a time when the fire danger rating in the Lytton area was "extreme", had sparked the blaze, which burned for months and caused multiple evacuations.

The RCMP also started an investigation of the Lytton fire, focusing on two areas. One area is a 2km area in nearby Boston Bar. In Lytton, police are focusing on a 1km radius containing a parking lot and park area, near a combined foot and rail bridge across the Fraser River, seeking to identify movements of people, vehicles and trains.

CN Rail responded to a video that showed one of its trains on fire by saying that the train in that video was 45 kilometres south of Lytton and the smoke seen in the video was from a different fire, one that was already burning. They said in a statement that the train in the video had passed through Lytton uneventfully several hours before the fire.

Initially, Transport Canada did not impose any additional restrictions on railways in the area, saying it was up to the railways to ensure safety. However, on July 11, Transport Canada imposed new restrictions to remain in effect until October 31, 2021. Railway speed was to be reduced in areas of extreme fire risk in order to reduce the risk of sparks from wheel friction and train brakes. Also, railways had to implement additional fire protection measures such a 60-minute response time for dealing with track-side fires, 10 fire-spotting patrols per day and making train conductors responsible for spotting fires.

By mid October 2021, the Transportation Safety Board ended its investigation concluding that it had found no evidence that the wildfire was caused by railway activity. However, the TSB also says that the lack of evidence does not 100 percent rule out a train being the cause. The BC Wildfire Service and the RCMP indicated they were continuing to investigate.

By May 2022, the Institute for Catastrophic Loss Reduction released a report indicating that the Lytton fire department had no realistic chance of stopping the fire because the village was full of combustible material lying within 30 metres (98 ft) of structures. Although the report did not specify how the fire was ignited, it said a number of ground fires spread out from near the CN railway tracks creating a swarm of burning embers. The combination of dry fuel in the village and high winds made the wildfire catastrophic. The town's buildings, including combustible sheds and outbuildings, were too close together, thus facilitating the spread of the fire.

== Criticism of response ==
Nlaka'pamux Nation Tribal Council chair Chief Matt Pasco told media outlets that the provincial government and the Thompson-Nicola Regional District had failed to co-ordinate evacuations and resources with the First Nations threatened by the fire. When the government contacted Pasco, he said, it was about the health of cattle on his ranch, rather than of First Nations residents who were forced to flee.

British Columbia Premier John Horgan had to answer criticism about his government's response to the crisis after First Nation leaders complained that the province hampered evacuation due to poor communications and by not providing sufficient support for evacuees. Chief Janet Webster of the Lytton First Nation said that the province should have immediately declared a state of emergency.

First Nations objected to the resumption of railway service in the area due to speculation that a spark from a train caused the fire. They threatened a blockade of local rail lines. On July 5, Canadian Pacific Railway had resumed rail service through Lytton First Nation, but Canadian National Railway had not as its line was more heavily damaged by the fire.

== Recovery ==
By October 2021, volunteers associated with the British Columbia Heritage Emergency Recovery Network (HERN) had combed through the burnt ruins of the Lytton Chinese History Museum to recover artifacts. Of the 1,600 artifacts stored in the museum, 200 were recovered including 40 in good condition. HERN also examined the site of the Lytton Museum and Archives where a pile of magazines survived the fire with their edges charred but contents still readable. Bulldozers were expected to raze the remains of the buildings in late October.

In November 2021, the provincial government gave a $1 million grant to the Village of Lytton as it had no tax base with the village mostly destroyed. The grant was to pay municipal staff and to restart the local economy. The November 2021 Pacific Northwest floods have stalled reconstruction efforts in Lytton by cutting off most highway access to the village. The business district was still lined by fenced-off, burnt-out establishments.

In May 2022, Lytton Mayor Jan Polderman hoped that the village could start rebuilding in September 2022. He planned to enact new bylaws to require fire-resistant materials in new buildings such as non-flammable siding and roofing materials, and to keep combustibles such as vegetation, sheds and wood piles at a safe distance from buildings. The federal government promised $6 million to rebuild to fire-resistant standards. However, many residents balked at the extra estimated $5,000 to fireproof houses. Also some fireproof materials would be harder to source. Thus, Denise O’Connor, Polderman's successor as mayor, decided along with city councillors to relax standards in order to facilitate rebuilding.

As of July 2025, a few houses have been rebuilt, but Lytton is still without the town hall, the food mart, the bar, the motel, the hospital and the bank. Only one business has been rebuilt, the Chinese History Museum.

== See also ==
- White Rock Lake fire – a 2021 wildfire that destroyed Monte Lake, another community
- Camp Fire (2018) – a wildfire that burned 95% of Paradise, California, in a similar quick-moving fashion to the Lytton fire
- Jasper wildfire
