= The Giles School =

French immersion school, Ontario, Canada

Coordinates: 43°45′01.1″N 79°21′20.6″W

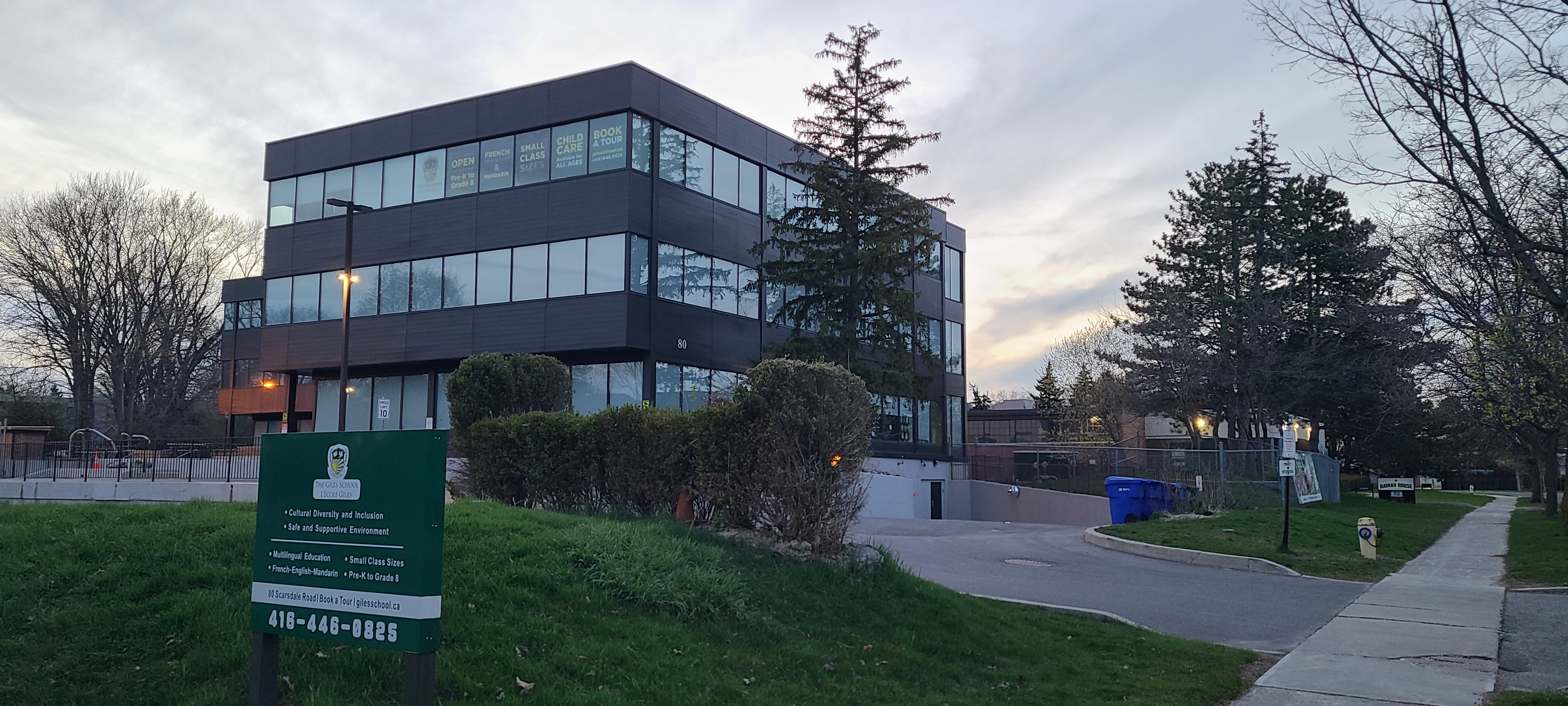
Building at the Giles School.

The Giles School is a private French immersion school located in Toronto, Ontario, Canada. The school (formerly called The Markham School for Human Development) was founded in 1989 by Harry Giles, CM, QC - a pioneer in bilingual French immersion in Canada and the founder of the Toronto French School.

The Giles School offers classes for students from Pre-Kindergarten (daycare, age 2) to Grade 8. It is independent, non-profit, non-denominational, non-gender, and co-educational.

== History ==
The school began at The Donway Covenant United Church near Don Mills and Lawrence with a small number of students. After one year the school moved to another site and then moved again in 1991. In 1994, with increased enrollment, it opened a second branch to house older students.

In 2008 The Giles School relocated to 80 Scarsdale Road in the York Mills and Leslie area of Toronto. This location provided a single building for all the school's students and offered room to expand.

== Admissions ==
The Giles School follows an open admissions policy where all admissions are on a first come, first served basis. Students are accepted at age 2 through Grade 1 without pre-testing or screening and with no previous French experience. The school believes firmly that with well-crafted and properly executed approaches to learning, achievements of exceptional academic power and emotional versatility are possible for all children.

The student population is limited to 170 with class sizes ranging from 10 to 16. Student to staff ratios are 8:1.

== Educational Philosophy ==
The school was founded on an educational philosophy developed by Giles. It is based on six pillars: early enriched learning, languages (bilingualism and Mandarin), small classes sizes, highest national standards and love.

== Curriculum ==
=== Pre-Kindergarten ===
French is the core language for all subjects at the Pre-Kindergarten level. Starting at age 2.5, The Giles School French immersion programme teaches children letters, numbers and French vocabulary using interactive games, books and pictures.

In mathematics, the goal is to have students counting aloud to 60 by the end of the year. Students are taught to recognize and write numbers up to 20.

=== Junior School ===
Starting in Grade 1, students are introduced their third language, mandarin. From Grades 2 to 3 children receive 45 minutes of English instruction everyday and from grades 4-6 children receive English for 1:30 a day; most core subjects are studied in French throughout the primary grades.

=== Half Middle School ===
French immersion is part of the curriculum until the end of Grade 6, at which point students have the option to continue. From Grades 4 to 6, French and English instruction share equal time. Students have the opportunity to learn for over 2 hours a week Mandarin.
