= Monte Lake Provincial Park =

Provincial park in British Columbia, Canada

- IUCN category II (national park)
- Location within British Columbia
- Interactive map of Monte Lake Provincial Park
- Location: British Columbia, Canada
- Nearest city: Vernon
- Coordinates: 50°30′01″N 119°49′55″W
- Area: 0.05 km^{2} (0.019 sq mi)
- Established: March 16, 1956
- Governing body: BC Parks

Monte Lake Provincial Park is a provincial park in British Columbia, Canada, located on the east side of Monte Lake and to the south of the community of Monte Lake, British Columbia which is at the north end of the lake. About five hectares in size, it protects an area of Ponderosa pine and grasslands.

== See also ==
- Monte Creek, British Columbia
