= White Rock Lake fire =

2021 wildfire in British Columbia, Canada

- Date: July 13, 2021-September 2021
- Location: Monte Lake, British Columbia, Canada
- Coordinates: 50°32′00″N 119°50′00″W

Statistics
- Burned area: 83,047 hectares 321 square miles 830 square kilometres 205,214 acres
- Land use: Residential, Crown land, forestry

Impacts
- Deaths: 0
- Evacuated: 3000+
- Structures lost: 29+ in Monte Lake, ~70 in Ewings Landing and Killiney, 11 on Okanagan Indian Band land

Ignition
- Cause: Lightning

The White Rock Lake fire was a wildfire in Thompson-Nicola Regional District, British Columbia. It began July 13, 2021 as one of the 2021 B.C. wildfires and resulted in the destruction of Monte Lake. It totalled 83,047 hectares and was classified as out of control. Insured losses total an estimated $77 million Canadian Dollars, according to one agency, which in late September expected the number of claims to top 800, most of them related to residential property.

== Start and spread ==
The White Rock Lake wildfire started during the 2021 Western North America heat wave. It was caused by lightning and first sighted July 13, 2021, when it was 10 hectares in size. It was reported at 3:46 p.m. and response began 30 minutes later, according to the Forests ministry.

By August 5 the fire covered 32,500 hectares between Kamloops and Vernon, and the hamlet of Monte Lake was evacuated. The fire resulted in the destruction of at least 28 residences and one business there. By August 6 the fire reached 55,000 hectares and evacuation alerts were issued for the cities of Vernon and Armstrong, as well as the village of Chase. By September 12 the fire covered 833 km^{2}.

"Thousands" were evacuated and over 2,000 properties were under an evacuation order. The fire damaged approximately 70 properties in the Ewings Landing and Killiney areas. The Okanagan Indian Band also reported 10 homes and one business destroyed.

On August 14 Monte Lake residents were permitted to return to the community. Although fire officials had previously declared it under control, in September they downgraded its status to "held" and said that it might continue to burn all winter:

“...smoking stumps and roots within the secured fire perimeter pose no risk of fire spread and will continue to burn into the winter. Although smoke will continue to be visible, there is no threat of further spread.”

== Criticism of response ==
Kamloops-South Thompson MLA Todd Stone called for a public inquiry into the provincial response, charging policy "is what causes these fires to get out of control". Kamloops This Week reported residents at the outset of the fire "claim they felt abandoned or say they were told to leave when trying to help". Deputy Forests Minister Rick Manwaring responded that the fire received response immediately after it was initially spotted. At another press conference, Mainwaring, asked about climate change, said that the BC Wildfire Service already allocates resources differently since the Chapman Report, issued in 2017. Many of its recommendations, he said, addressed changing conditions and climate change.

== See also ==
- BC Wildfire Service
- Lytton wildfire
