= Ray Charambura =

Canadian football player (1928–2021)

No. 54
- Position: End

Personal information
- Born: November 29, 1928; Winnipeg, Manitoba
- Died: October 7, 2021 (aged 92); Winnipeg, Manitoba
- Listed height: 6 ft 2 in (1.88 m)
- Listed weight: 184 lb (83 kg)

Career information
- High school: Isaac Newton (MB); Cheltenham (PA)
- College: none

Career history
- 1950–1951: Winnipeg Blue Bombers
- c. 1952–1955: Winnipeg Rams

Raymond Charambura (November 29, 1928 – October 7, 2021) was a Canadian professional football end who spent two seasons in the Western Interprovincial Football Union (WIFU) (now CFL West Division) for the Winnipeg Blue Bombers. A native of Winnipeg, Charambura played one season for his hometown team, appearing in twelve games as his team made the 1950 Grey Cup. He was initially on the 1951 team but was released after one exhibition game. He later played for the Winnipeg Rams intermediate football team and won the 1954 league championship. He died on October 7, 2021, at the age of 92.
