= Michel Gravel (photographer) =

Canadian photographer (1936–2021)

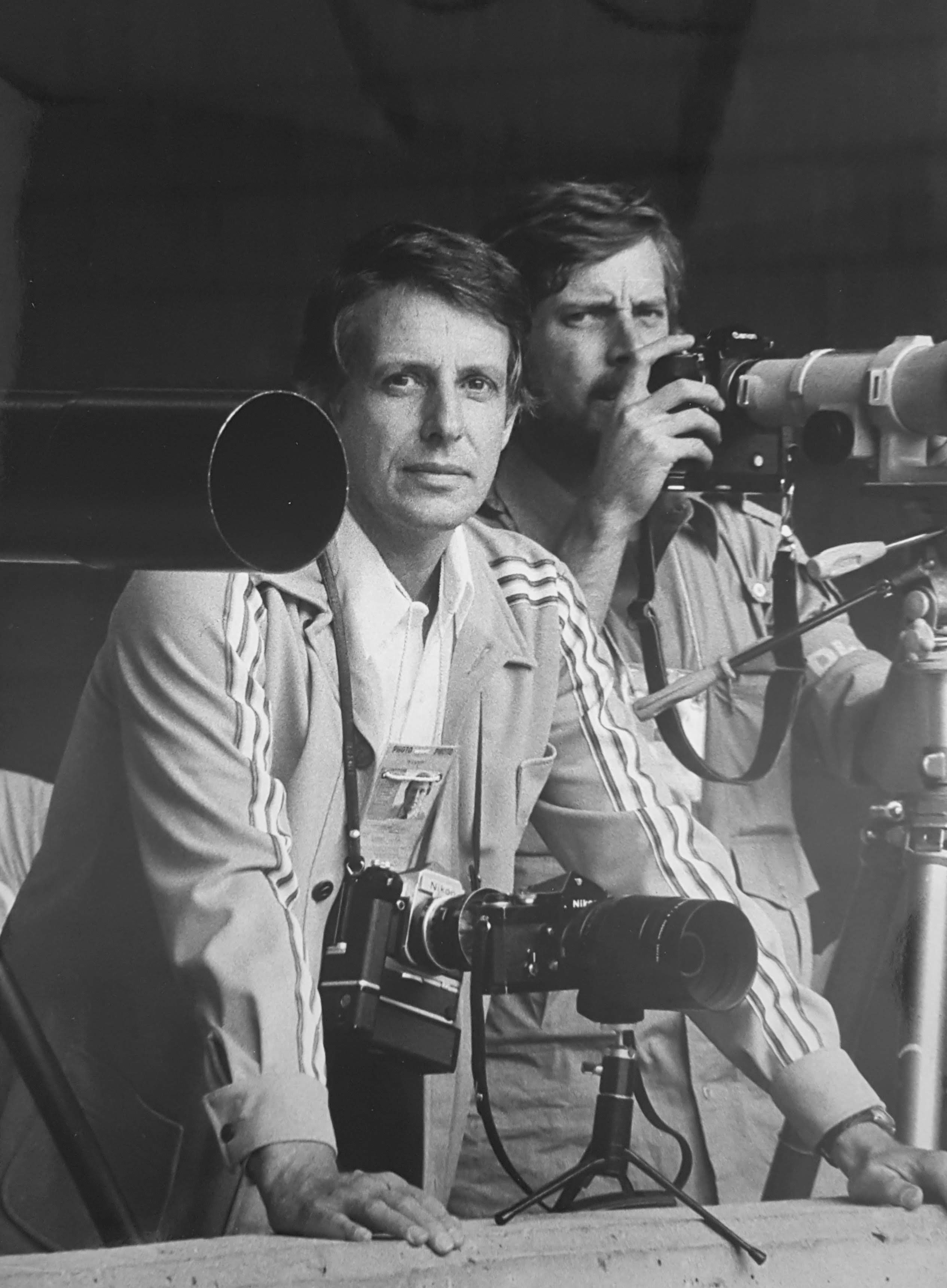
- Gravel in 1976
- Born: 1936; Montreal, Quebec, Canada
- Died: 13 January 2021 (aged 84–85)
- Occupation: Photographer

Michel Gravel (1936 – 13 January 2021) was a Canadian photographer. He was one of the leading photojournalists in Quebec.

== Biography ==
After he finished his studies in photography in 1954, Gravel worked for the Studio David Bier from 1956 to 1957. After that, he worked for newspapers such as Le Devoir, the Montreal Gazette, and La Presse. During his tenure, he covered major events such as the Vietnam War and the 1976 Summer Olympics. He officially retired in 2005. That year, several of his photographs were exhibited in a retrospective at the Maison de la culture Frontenac in Montreal.

Michel Gravel died on 13 January 2021 at the age of 84.
