= Paul Birckel =

Canadian businessman and American Indian Chief (1938–2021)

- Born: 25 October 1938 near Kluane Lake, Yukon, Canada
- Died: 8 July 2021 (aged 82); Whitehorse, Yukon, Canada
- Occupation(s): Businessman; American Indian Chief

Paul Birckel (25 October 1938 – 8 July 2021) was a Canadian businessman and Chief of the Champagne and Aishihik First Nations.

== Biography ==
Birckel's father was from Alsace but left France in 1930 to take part in the Klondike Gold Rush. Paul was known for defending the rights and interest of the First Nations while working in Ottawa. As a prospector, he collaborated with petroleum companies in Alberta and Saskatchewan while working for ATCO Electric Yukon.

In 1978, Birckel was elected Chief of the Champagne and Aishihik First Nations in Haines Junction, defending the interest of the tribe until 1998. He participated in negotiations with officials in Ottawa to help the tribe. He served as Executive Director of the Indian Council of the Province of Yukon.

Birckel received numerous awards, including Best Businessman of the Year award from the Yukon Chamber of Commerce, the National Aboriginal Achievement Award for Community Development in 2000, and a Merit Award from the Commissioner of Yukon.

Paul Birckel died in Whitehorse on 8 July 2021 at the age of 82.
