= Aurélien Boisvert =

Canadian historian (1927–2021)

- Born: 1927
- Died: 3 May 2021 (aged 93–94)
- Occupation: Historian

Aurélien Boisvert (1927 – 3 May 2021) was a Canadian historian and lawyer. He attended classical college in Terrebonne and subsequently studied law at the Université de Montréal. Following his law career, he published several books on New France.

== Books ==
- Aperçu des mœurs et coutumes des Agniers au xviie siècle (1991)
- Histoire du Montréal, 1640-1672 (1992)
- Une vallée de la mort attendait les Français
- Prisonniers des Agniers (1994)
- Nation iroquoise (1996)
- Voyage chez les Onnontagués (1998)
- Monsieur Duplessis a-t-il eu la tête de Mgr Charbonneau ? (1999)
- Dollard, ses compagnons et ses alliés (2005)

== Honors ==
- Prix Percy-W.-Foy (2006)
