= Rae German =

Canadian football player (1940–2021)

Profile
- Position: Halfback

Personal information
- Born: November 30, 1940
- Died: September 21, 2021 (aged 80)
- Listed height: 6 ft 0 in (1.83 m)
- Listed weight: 207 lb (94 kg)

Career history
- 1965: Hamilton Tiger-Cats

Awards and highlights
- Grey Cup champion (1965)

Raemond Fitzgerald German (November 30, 1940 – September 21, 2021) was a Canadian football player who played for the Hamilton Tiger-Cats. He won the Grey Cup with them in 1965. He played previously at the University of Guelph, where he got a master's degree in agricultural mechanical engineering in 1966. In 2005, he was a project manager for the Jimmy Carter Habitat for Humanity program.
