= Marcia H. Rioux =

Canadian legal scholar (1947–2021)

- Born: May 16, 1947; Trail, British Columbia, Canada
- Died: September 20, 2021 (aged 74)
- Partner: Ezra B. W. Zubrow

Academic background
- Education: B.A., M.A., Carleton University; PhD, Jurisprudence and Social Policy, 1993, University of California, Berkeley
- Thesis: The equality-disability nexus: the history and law of mental handicap in Canada (1994)

Academic work
- Institutions: York University

Marcia Hampton Rioux (née Gautschi) OC (1947 – September 20, 2021) was a Canadian legal scholar. She was a Distinguished Research Professor in the School of Health Policy and Management at York University.

== Early life and education ==
Marcia Rioux was born in Trail, British Columbia, Canada, in 1947.

== Career ==
Rioux began her academic career at the Royal Commission on the Status of Women in 1968 as a research assistant. As the first Director of Research for the National Advisory Council on the Status of Women, she focused her research on indigenous women. Before earning her PhD, Rioux worked as a Policy Analyst on the Law Reform Commission of Canada from 1977 until 1979. In 1978, Rioux and Joanna McFadyen published a report that promoted a revision in the Canadian Criminal Code regarding sexual assault victims. After earning her doctorate, Rioux worked as Director of the Roeher Institute in Downsview, Ontario, from 1987 until 2002.

She was the Director of the York Institute of Health Research at York University from 2002 until 2014. Starting in 2002, she also chaired York's School of Health Policy and Management. In her role as director and chair, Rioux was invited to La Trobe University in 2008 to work with law professor Lee Ann Basser on developing disability policy in Victoria, Australia. A few years later, Rioux, Basser, and Melinda Jones published Critical Perspectives on Human Rights and Disability Law through Brill Publishers.

In February 2013, Rioux began an international research project to promote employment of people with disabilities in Bangladesh, India and Nepal. By April, York University awarded Rioux the 2013 President's Research Excellence Award. Later, in recognition of her academic achievements, York University appointed Rioux the title of Distinguished Research Professor.

In 2014, Rioux was the recipient of the Lieutenant Governor's Community Volunteer Award in recognition of her contributions to Ontario communities. Later that year, she was also named a Member of the Order of Canada for her research in the field of social justice.

On February 3, 2015, Rioux was recognized by the Ontario Confederation of University Faculty Associations with the 2014 Status of Women Award of Distinction and the Lorimer Award. She also published a co-edited book titled Disability, Rights Monitoring, and Social Change: Building Power out of Evidence. The book, published through the Canadian Scholars’ Press, attempted to address the issues facing United Nations Convention on the Rights of Persons with Disabilities, such as civil society monitoring.

She died on September 20, 2021.

== Selected publications ==
The following is a selected list of publications:

- Web of the law: a study of sexual offences in the Canadian criminal code (1975)
- Human rights and health and safety in the workplace: balancing the rights of the worker and the needs of the employer (1984)
- How it happens: a look at inclusive educational practice in Canada for children and youth with disabilities (1992)
- The contradiction of kindness--the clarity of justice (1993)
- Reflections on the Canada Health and Social Transfer (1996)
- Atlas of literacy and disability (2003)
- Critical perspectives on human rights and disability law (2011)
- Disability, Rights Monitoring, and Social Change: Building Power out of Evidence (2016)
