= Death of Jeffrey Northrup =

Canadian police officer (1966–2021)

Detective Constable Jeffrey Northrup

Personal details
- Born: April 22, 1966
- Died: July 2, 2021 (aged 55) Toronto, Ontario, Canada
- Citizenship: Canada
- Spouse: Margaret Northrup (m. 1995)
- Occupation: Police officer
- Awards: Police Exemplary Service Medal

Jeffrey Northrup (April 22, 1966 – July 2, 2021) was a Toronto police officer who was killed in a vehicle accident on July 2, 2021, while investigating a stabbing call in the parking garage below City Hall near Queen and Bay streets in Toronto, Ontario, Canada.

Umar Zameer was accused of intentionally running over Northrup and was charged with first-degree murder. He pleaded not guilty. In April 2024, he was found not guilty after a trial.

== Incident and death ==
At around midnight on July 2, 2021, TPS responded to a call for a stabbing near Toronto City Hall. Northrup, along with Sergeant Lisa Forbes, entered a parking garage under City Hall, where they found Umar Zameer, his wife Aaida Shaikh, and their two-year-old son, sitting in their locked van. Both officers approached Zameer's car with their guns drawn. Security cameras did not capture the initial incident. Zameer and the TPS' account of what happened next differ.

Zameer's account

According to Zameer, neither Northrup nor Forbes identified that they were police when they "rushed towards his car". Having heard of an anti-Muslim attack on a family nearly a month prior, he feared he was being targeted by criminals when the officers banged on his car window. Zameer initially drove forward, but was quickly blocked by an unmarked police vehicle. He then reversed into the laneway, knocking down constable Northrup. Not realizing that he had knocked down Northrup, Zameer once again accelerated forward, running over and mortally wounding the constable. Zameer thought he had run over a speed bump rather than the constable.

Toronto Police's account

According to TPS, both officers identified themselves repeatedly when approaching Zameer's vehicle. They claim that Northrup wasn't knocked down by Zameer reversing his car, and Northrup was standing and clearly visible when Zameer ran him over in a deliberate act.

Death

Northrup was dragged six meters under Zameer's car, breaking several ribs, fracturing his spine, and lacerating his liver. He was transported to St. Michael's Hospital, where he was pronounced dead.

Northrup had 31 years of service with the Toronto Police Service. He lived in Brampton, Ontario and is survived by his wife, three children and his mother. His funeral service took place on July 12, 2021, at BMO Field. Funeral attendees included Ontario Premier Doug Ford and Toronto Mayor John Tory. The City of Brampton named a park after Northrup on April 25, 2022.

== Legal proceedings ==
=== Zameer's bail hearing ===
In September 2021, a bail hearing for Zameer was held with a publication ban on the proceedings. At the hearing, Ontario Superior Court Justice Jill Copeland told prosecutors that she found the case weak, particularly due to a lack of evidence as to motive. Specifically she said "There is no evidence of any motive for Mr. Zameer to want to kill a police officer, or to kill anyone, for that matter". The judge granted bail. After bail was granted, both Mayor John Tory and Ontario Premier Doug Ford publicly criticized the decision while unaware of the reason for granting bail due to the publication ban.

=== Zameer's murder trial ===
The murder trial of Zameer concluded in April 2024. The jury had to decide on one of the following four verdicts: first-degree murder, second-degree murder, manslaughter or not guilty.

The prosecution asked the jury for a verdict of first-degree murder. In the killing of a police officer, the prosecution does not need to prove pre-meditation for a first-degree murder conviction if it can be proven that the accused intended to kill knowing the victim was an officer.

During the trial, the credibility of the TPS eyewitnesses were highly scrutinized due to prior allegations of misconduct in other cases and also due to the testimonies being inconsistent with the reconstructed scene. Ontario Superior Court Justice Anne Molloy instructed jurors to consider whether police witnesses colluded because they all gave the same incorrect evidence. Witness officers said that before being struck, Northrup stood in front of Zameer's car with arms outstretched indicating that Zameer should stop. A prosecution expert witness said this was not the case as there was no damage to the front of Zameer's car. A defense expert witness said Northrup was standing in a blind spot at the rear of the car. The trial judge noted that the security video from the parking garage supported Zameer and expert witnesses' testimony. After the jury announced a verdict of not-guilty, Justice Molloy offered Zameer "my deepest apologies for what you’ve been through."

=== Aftermath ===
After the not guilty verdict, Zameer's wife organized a GoFundMe campaign to raise funds to offset Zameer's legal fees. The fundraiser surpassed $300,000 by May 2024.

The three police officers who testified as witnesses in the trial were subsequently identified by Ontario prosecutors as "deliberately untruthful" on the witness stand. Toronto Police chief Myron Demkiw ordered a review of the officers' testimonies in this trial.

In March 2026, the Ontario Provincial Police (OPP) released the independent report and stated insufficient evidence could not corroborate Judge Anne Molloy's assertion that the police officers lied in court and perjured themselves but could not provide evidence that proves the officers' recollections were entirely accurate.
