= Nadia Chaudhri =

Canadian psychologist (1978–2021)

- Born: January 25, 1978; Karachi, Pakistan
- Died: October 5, 2021 (aged 43); Montreal, Quebec, Canada

Academic background
- Education: BA, Biological Foundations of Behavior, Franklin & Marshall College; PhD, Neuroscience, 2005, University of Pittsburgh
- Thesis: Complex interactions between nicotine and nonpharmacological stimuli reveal a novel role for nicotine in reinforcement (2005)

Academic work
- Institutions: Concordia University
- Website: chaudhrilab.com

Nadia Chaudhri (January 25, 1978 – October 5, 2021) was a Pakistani-Canadian psychologist. She was a professor of psychology at Concordia University where she researched drug and alcohol abuse.

== Early life and education ==
Nadia Chaudhri was born on January 25, 1978, in Karachi, to Abdul Shakoor and Susan Mary Chaudhri. She was raised in Karachi. Since her mother was raised in England, she grew up around Western influence and her father who allowed her to pursue higher education overseas. She moved to the United States at the age of 17 and attended Franklin & Marshall College for her bachelor's degree in biological foundations of behavior with a concentration in neuroscience studies. She graduated in 1999 with a 3.9 grade point average and the Williamson Medal as F&M's top senior. Chaudhri then received a Howard Hughes Medical Institute fellowship to complete her doctoral degree at the University of Pittsburgh. Her thesis was titled "Complex interactions between nicotine and nonpharmacological stimuli reveal a novel role for nicotine in reinforcement".

== Career ==
Chaudhri completed her post-doctoral training at the Ernest Gallo Clinic and Research Center at the University of California, San Francisco. In this role, she found that the physical surroundings where alcohol cues are experienced can greatly influence the ability of those cues to trigger a relapse. Chaudhri eventually joined the Center for Studies in Behavioral Neurobiology (CSBN) and the Department of Psychology at Concordia University in January 2010 as an assistant professor and was promoted to associate professor with tenure in June 2014. On September 9, 2021, she was promoted to Full Professor

At Concordia, Chaudhri’s research program has been funded by the Canadian Institutes of Health Research, the Natural Sciences and Engineering Research Council, the Canadian Foundation for Innovation, ABMRF/The Foundation for Alcohol Research, Fonds de recherche Santé Québec and Concordia University. Her research team, composed of undergraduates, graduate students and postdoctoral fellows, studied the effect that environmental cues have on drug use, misuse and relapse. Specifically, they studied the psychological processes that underpin how people associate stimuli in the environment with the psychopharmacological effects of drugs. In addition, they used a suite of advanced neuroscientific techniques to understand the brain systems and processes that underpin these associations. The ultimate goal of this research is to help people who have substance use disorders overcome the powerful effects that drug-predictive cues can have on drug-seeking behaviour and relapse.

During her tenure at Concordia, Chaudhri and her laboratory associates studied the effect environmental cues can have on drug use. In her first year as an associate professor, Chaudhri won the inaugural Journal of Visualized Experiments JoVE video abstract contest after she showed Pavlovian-conditioned alcohol-seeking is mediated by dopamine. Later, Chaudhri and colleague Andrew Chapman published Optogenetic Activation of the Infralimbic Cortex Suppresses the Return of Appetitive Pavlovian-Conditioned Responding Following Extinction, which demonstrated how stimulation of the brain’s infralimbic cortex could inhibit responses to environmental cues that predict sugar. She was also named a Concordia University Research Fellow.

During the COVID-19 pandemic, Chaudhri underwent chemotherapy treatment for advanced ovarian cancer. She documented her last months with ovarian cancer on Twitter while raising funds to support students from underrepresented communities. She launched a GoFundMe campaign to raise money for travel awards to allow young scholars to participate in the annual meeting for the Research Society on Alcoholism.

== Personal life ==
Chaudhri and her husband had a son. Chaudhri died on October 5, 2021, more than a year after being diagnosed with ovarian cancer.
