= Bob McPhee =

Canadian singer (1956–2021)

W. R. McPhee, CM (January 22, 1956 – March 13, 2021) was a Canadian singer and arts administrator. He worked for 19 years as the head of the Calgary Opera.

== Career ==
McPhee began his career as a baritone performing in theatre, opera, radio and television after graduating from the University of Manitoba. He then studied arts administration at Grant MacEwan University, The Banff Centre School of Management and Stanford University. He served as artistic director and conductor for several choral groups and taught private classes.

Gradually, McPhee became more involved in arts administration and his first administrative position was the Royal Winnipeg Ballet as Development Officer, then as Director of Development. He joined the Calgary Philharmonic Orchestra as Director of Development and Marketing, and was later appointed Assistant General Manager.

McPhee served as General Manager of Orchestra London, prior to joining the Edmonton Symphony as General Manager. In 1992 he was appointed president and CEO of the Edmonton Symphony Society and Edmonton Concert Hall Foundation. He led these organizations to the on-schedule and on-budget completion of the state-of-the-art Winspear Centre for Music, complete with a $5M operating endowment in place. The orchestra was in a stable fiscal position with a solid base of support of over 13,000 subscribers. They introduced a summer festival, began a touring program, made significant commitments to the development and creation of Canadian works, and release numerous recordings. In addition, the organization had grown to a total operating budget of $12M with just over 200 employees.

McPhee joined Calgary Opera as general director and CEO in 1998, allowing him to return to opera. During his time at Calgary Opera he commissioned eight new works and presented numerous Canadian premieres. His tenure saw the foundation of one of only three comprehensive young artist training programs in Canada, and started Canada's first outdoor summer opera festival – Opera in the Village. In addition, McPhee focused on featuring Canadian artists both on the stage and backstage, and created community and education outreach programs that promote and take opera to the broader community.

In 2016, McPhee announced a partnership with Calgary Stampede that would see the Calgary Opera move to the Calgary Stampede’s Youth Campus within five years. Under the agreement, Calgary Opera will build a 50,000 square foot Opera Centre, which will include public space, a 300-seat rehearsal and performance space, classrooms, practice halls, administrative offices and more.

McPhee has been featured in the media on numerous occasions, both as spokesperson for the various companies he has led, and personally as a visionary in the Canadian arts community. Throughout his career, McPhee was active in many professional associations and in demand as a clinician and lecturer. An adjudicator, assessor and board member for numerous organizations, he was the first Canadian invited to speak at an Opera Europa Conference in Paris. He was a founding board member of the Calgary Arts Development Authority, Past Chair of Opera.ca, was a member of the OPERA America Board of Directors, sat on the Lieutenant Governor of Alberta Arts Award, as well as the Premier's Council for Culture.

McPhee was the recipient of many awards, including the Order of Canada (2013) and an Opera Canada Lifetime Achievement Award, also known as a Ruby (2015). In November, 2016, McPhee was a recipient of an Honorary Degree, Doctor of Laws, the highest honour conferred by the University of Calgary, and delivered the convocation ceremony address.

McPhee died from cancer on March 13, 2021, at age 65.
