= Pete Petcoff =

Canadian football player (1932–2021)

No. 72, 71
- Positions: End, guard

Personal information
- Born: April 23, 1932; Hamilton, Ontario, Canada
- Died: December 13, 2021 (aged 89); Hamilton, Ontario, Canada
- Listed height: 6 ft 0 in (1.83 m)
- Listed weight: 208 lb (94 kg)

Career information
- High school: St. Michael's (ON)
- University: none

Career history
- 1953: Hamilton Tiger-Cats
- 1953: Calgary Stampeders
- 1954: Hamilton Panthers
- 1955: Ottawa Rough Riders

Peter Marko Petcoff (born Petkoff; April 23, 1932 – December 13, 2021) was a Canadian professional football end and guard who played one season in the Western Interprovincial Football Union (WIFU) for the Calgary Stampeders and one in the Interprovincial Rugby Football Union (IRFU) for the Ottawa Rough Riders.

A native of Hamilton, Ontario, Petcoff attended St. Michael's High School in Toronto and skipped college. He played junior football in 1952 for the Hamilton Tiger-Cats junior team, being signed to the senior team in 1953. He ended up playing the 1953 season in the Western Interprovincial Football Union (WIFU) with the Calgary Stampeders, appearing in nine games. Petcoff joined the Hamilton Panthers intermediate football team in 1954. He played with the Ottawa Rough Riders in the Interprovincial Rugby Football Union (IRFU) during 1955, appearing in 12 games.

Petcoff died in his hometown of Hamilton, Ontario, on December 13, 2021, at the age of 89.
