= Jack Lamb =

Canadian football player (1935–2021)

Profile
- Positions: Guard, Tackle

Personal information
- Born: December 23, 1935; Edmonton, Alberta, Canada
- Died: August 17, 2021 (aged 85); Calgary, Alberta, Canada
- Listed height: 6 ft 3 in (1.91 m)
- Listed weight: 230 lb (104 kg)

Career history
- 1955: Edmonton Eskimos
- 1956–1959: Calgary Stampeders
- 1960–1964: Edmonton Eskimos

Awards and highlights
- Grey Cup champion (1955)

John Bradley Lamb (December 23, 1935 – August 17, 2021) was a Canadian professional football player who played for the Edmonton Eskimos and Calgary Stampeders. He won the Grey Cup with the Eskimos in 1955. He was born in Edmonton, but played junior football in Calgary and in Kitchener with the Kitchener-Waterloo Dutchmen. Lamb also played ice hockey for the Maple Leaf Athletic Club.
