= Harry Giles (educator) =

Canadian academic (1930–2021)

William Henry Giles
- Born: September 1, 1930; Windsor, Ontario, Canada
- Died: December 5, 2021 (aged 91)
- Education: University of Toronto (B.A., M.E.); Osgoode Hall (LL.B.)
- Occupations: Educator, lawyer
- Organization(s): Toronto French School, The Giles School
- Children: 3
- Awards: Order of Canada, Queen's Silver Jubilee medal, Commemorative medal from the Government of Canada

William Henry Giles CM QC (September 1, 1930 – December 5, 2021) was a Canadian educator who was regarded as a pioneer in early academic intervention and French immersion. He was the founder of two French immersion private schools, the Toronto French School and The Giles School.

Born in Windsor, Ontario, Giles had a Master of Education and a Bachelor of Arts from the University of Toronto as well as a Bachelor of Laws from Osgoode Hall in Toronto. In 1954, he married Anna Por, with whom he had three children. Giles died on December 5, 2021, at the age of 91.

== Achievements ==
A founder, and for 25 years, headmaster of the Toronto French School, Giles introduced bilingual immersion education in Canada at the Toronto French School, which he founded and served for 25 years as headmaster. He also introduced and implemented the first early intervention programmes in Canadian schools. The success of his education model was instrumental in launching French immersion programmes throughout the North American public school system.

Giles established the prestigious pre-university competitions, the Canadian Chemistry and Physics Olympiads, and started the first GCE Ordinary ("O") and Advanced ("A") examination centre in Canada. He assisted in the creation of the International Baccalaureate and established the first examination centre of the International Baccalaureate in Canada. He has participated actively in worldwide education communities including representing Canada at the 2nd, 3rd and 4th International Curriculum Conferences.

He received membership in the Order of Canada in 1973 for his initiative in creating and directing the first private school in Toronto offering instruction in the French language. He also received the Queen's Silver Jubilee medal and the Commemorative medal from the Government of Canada.

Giles was a Queen's Counsel and worked as a lawyer for many years. He has served as president of a chemical company, an economist in Canada and the Middle East, and director of various public and private corporations. His publications include Schools and Students: Legal Aspects of Administration, the play Mazaryk, as well as poetry and numerous articles in journals.

== Schools ==
=== Toronto French School ===
In 1962, the Toronto French School—one of Canada's most prominent private schools—was created in the basement of the Giles household. Committed to providing their own children with the advantage of a bilingual education, Giles and Anna hired a French language teacher and started an extended home learning programme for six students.

Rental facilities became necessary as the school grew and by 1966 six campuses were set up across the Toronto area, including one in Mississauga. Following the addition of the Mildenhall Branch in 1971 and the former Sifton estate in 1981, Giles set out to merge the geographically sprawling Toronto French School premises. In 1984, all of the Toronto locations were consolidated in one campus at Bayview and Lawrence Avenue East and, in 1995, a permanent home was purchased for the Mississauga campus.

=== The Giles School ===
In 1989, Giles opened The Giles School (then known as The Markham School for Human Development) with just a handful of students in an Anglican church in Toronto. The school moved to another location after one year and then again in 1991. In 1994, with increased enrollment, it opened a second campus to house senior students. In September 2008, the school merged its locations and moved to a permanent home near York Mills and Leslie in Toronto.

The Giles School was founded on Giles' philosophy of education, which is based on six pillars: early academic intervention, bilingualism, third languages, small classes, highest international standards and love.

At The Giles School, children are not pre-screened on the basis of standardized tests. In an attempt to counter the exclusive process of private school student selection, Giles instituted a first-come, first-served admissions policy based on the conviction that his unique educational programme would improve the overall academic achievement of any child, regardless of his or her initial or apparent aptitude.

== Scientific support ==
The founding of the Toronto French School coincided with what later proved to be education-altering research in neuroscience, cognitive psychology and early childhood development.

At the same time that Giles began introducing very young children to a second language with improved academic results across all subjects, the work of Nobel Prize laureates Dr. David Hubel and Torsten Wiesel demonstrated that if the visual cortex behind the eye is deprived of stimulation during initial development, it will never be able to process visual information, even if the eye itself is not defective.

Giles' intuition was vindicated by the discovery that appropriate and targeted sensory stimulation is fundamental during formative brain development, or neural pathways will die and that the window of opportunity for cultivating optimal sensory processing is alarmingly brief. The discovery of this narrowly defined opportunity for bolstering neural pathway expansion has come to be known as the critical period in early brain development. It determines children's capacity for language acquisition and higher cognitive functioning.

During the 1980s and 1990s, interdisciplinary researchers, such as Canadian neurologist Dr. Fraser Mustard, illuminated the connection between optimal early development and durable social health. Giles' longstanding educational philosophy was further borne out by the realization that early intervention (especially the first three years) has a lifelong effect on the brain's wiring and sculpting, setting the stage for future competence and coping skills.

== Bibliography ==
Giles, W.H. (1985) A paean for love: poems, Primorg Press, ISBN 0-921003-00-5
Giles, W.H. (1988) Schools and Students: Legal Aspects of Administration, Carswell Legal Publications, ISBN 0-459-31201-4
