= Joncas River =

Joncas River may refer to:

- Joncas River (Ferrée River tributary), in Chaudière-Appalaches, Quebec, Canada
- Joncas River (Harricana River tributary), a stream in Ontario, and Quebec Canada
