= Raghu Venugopal =

Doctor and professor

- Education: Johns Hopkins University; McGill University; Harvard University
- Occupations: Emergency physician, University Health Network

Raghu Venugopal is a Toronto-based emergency physician and professor who led a one-man anti-vaccine counter protest in 2021.

== Education ==
Venugopal completed his medical residency training at McGill University before completing an international emergency medicine fellowship at Johns Hopkins University.

He has a Masters of Public Health from Harvard University.

== Career ==
Venugopal has worked for Médecins Sans Frontières in Burundi, Central African Republic, Chad, and the Democratic Republic of the Congo. He has served on the board of directors of Médecins Sans Frontières Canada.

He works at Toronto General Hospital, and is an assistant professor of medicine at the University of Toronto.

In 2016, he spoke of the benefits of telemedicine in a Médecins Sans Frontières run hospital in the Democratic Republic of the Congo.

In 2019, he spoke out against the Ontario Provincial Government's cuts to the public health budget.

In August 2021, he spoke out against the nursing shortage in Ontario.

In September 2021, Venugopal counter protested an anti-vaccination protest outside the Toronto General Hospital. He called the protests "un-Canadian" and "unacceptable". The same day, Canadian Prime Minister Justin Trudeau announced he would criminalize blocking access to hospitals; and an amendment to the Criminal Code of Canada was approved on the 17 December 2021.
