= Constance Isherwood =

Canadian lawyer (1920–2021)

Constance Isherwood QC
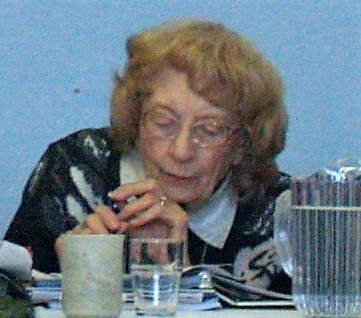
- Isherwood at the Diocese of British Columbia Synod in 2010
- Born: Constance Dora Holmes; January 19, 1920; Nanaimo, British Columbia, Canada
- Died: January 26, 2021 (aged 101); Victoria, British Columbia, Canada
- Education: University of British Columbia
- Occupation: Lawyer

Constance Dora Isherwood QC (née Holmes; January 19, 1920 – January 26, 2021) was a Canadian lawyer based in British Columbia who focused on civil and family law, and real estate law. At the time of her death, she was the oldest practicing lawyer in British Columbia. She was a recipient of Canada's 125th anniversary medal for community service and also the lifetime achievement awards from the Law Society of British Columbia, University of British Columbia, and University of Victoria.

== Early life ==
Isherwood was born Constance Dora Holmes on January 19, 1920, in Nanaimo, on Vancouver Island, British Columbia, to Grace and Charles Holmes. Her father was a forest ranger and her mother was a homemaker. She attended Harwood Elementary School and John Shaw High School graduating in 1937. She was a drummer in an all-girls band and wanted to pursue a career in an orchestra. During the Second World War, she was a member of a singing group that performed concerts at army training camps across British Columbia, and toured with the band for eight months across British Columbia, Alberta, Manitoba, and Saskatchewan. However, after studying for a year in Victoria College, she was inspired to join law school by lawyer Ernest Tait, for whom she was working as a legal secretary.

== Career ==
Holmes studied law at the University of British Columbia in Victoria, enrolling in 1948 and graduating in 1951. She was one of only eight women in a class of 208, and graduated first in her class. She was called to the bar in the same year. During her time in school, she was nicknamed 'Sherlock Holmes' because of the questions that she would ask in class and the clues she would be on the lookout for. After graduating, she worked with Tait again, setting up the legal firm Tait & Holmes. In 1963, she founded the legal firm Holmes & Isherwood. She focused on civil and family law, and real estate law. At the time of her death, she was the oldest practicing lawyer in British Columbia, closing her last case, a real estate deal, hours before her death.

One of her major achievements was acting as the legal advisor for the Anglican Diocese of British Columbia guiding them on issues including residential schools, gay marriage, and female priests. She was a mentor to women law practitioners through her career, specifically through the 1960s and 1970s. Speaking of the advances made toward gender equality in the profession, she would note later in her career, "Now, the number of female students in law either equals or exceeds men. I'm amazed."

She was the recipient of the Law Society of British Columbia's lifetime achievement award in 1996, becoming the first woman to receive the honor. She received an honorary doctorate from the University of British Columbia in 2015. She was also the recipient of the University of Victoria's lifetime achievement award in 2006. She received Canada's 125th anniversary medal for community service. As a resident of Victoria, she was a member of the Women's Business Network of Vancouver Island, the Victoria Symphony, the Victoria Board of Trustees of the Canadian Scottish Regiment, and the Asian Arts Society.

== Personal life ==
Isherwood was married to fellow lawyer T.(Thomas) Foster Isherwood; they had met at law school. The couple went on to adopt two sons. Her husband predeceased her, in 2011. She died on January 26, 2021, aged 101.
