= Steve Molnar =

Canadian gridiron football player (1947–2021)

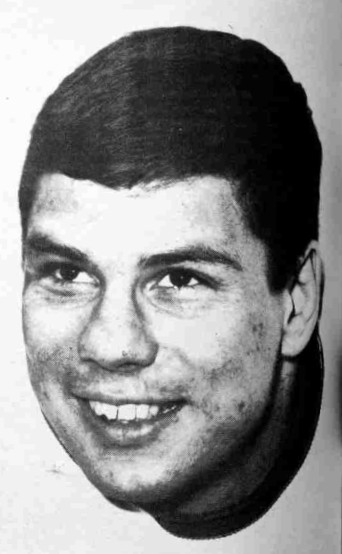
- Molnar, circa 1968

Profile
- Position: Running back

Personal information
- Born: February 28, 1947; Saskatoon, Saskatchewan
- Died: January 16, 2021 (aged 73); Newmarket, Ontario
- Listed height: 5 ft 11 in (1.80 m)
- Listed weight: 200 lb (91 kg)

Career information
- College: Utah

Career history
- 1969–1978: Saskatchewan Roughriders

Steve Molnar (February 28, 1947 – January 16, 2021) was a Canadian Football League running back.

Molnar played in the 1972 and 1976 Grey Cups for the Saskatchewan Roughriders.

== Statistics ==
When Molnar played for the Saskatchewan Roughriders he scored in the 1975 Western Conference final 3 touchdowns, 1 two point convert, 0 field goals, 0 safeties, for a total of 20 points.
