= Catherine Sheldrick Ross =

Canadian academic (1945–2021)

- Born: Catherine Louise Sheldrick; November 4, 1945; London, Ontario, Canada
- Died: September 11, 2021 (aged 75); London, Ontario, Canada

Academic background
- Education: University of Toronto (BA, MA); University of Western Ontario (PhD)
- Thesis: Dark matrix: a study of Isabella Valancy Crawford (1975)

Catherine Sheldrick Ross FRSC (November 4, 1945 – September 11, 2021) was a professor at and later dean of the Faculty of Information and Media Studies at the University of Western Ontario. In 2018, she was elected a Fellow of the Royal Society of Canada.

== Personal life ==
Ross was born to Russell and Elsie Sheldrick in London, Ontario, and she spent her summers in New Brunswick. Both her mother and aunt were teachers.

== Education and career ==
Ross earned her undergraduate and master's degrees at the University of Toronto before completing her PhD at the University of Western Ontario. Due to budget cuts, Ross was unable to find a career in teaching until 1981, when she joined the School of Library and Information Science (SLIS) at the University of Western Ontario.

In 1995, Ross was awarded the Jesse Shera Award for Research by the American Library Association for her article “If They Read Nancy Drew, So What? – Readers Talk Back".

After reading Paulette Bourgeois's book series Franklin the Turtle, Ross was inspired to start writing her own children's books. In 1996, her book Squares: Shapes in Math, Science and Nature was awarded the Science in Society Book Award by the Canadian Science Writers' Association. She was awarded the Reference Service Press Award for her co-authored article in Reference and User Services Quarterly, "Flying a Light Aircraft: Reference Service Evaluation from a User's Viewpoint".

The same year, the SLIS merged with the School of Journalism and Part-time and Continuing Education to form the Faculty of Information and Media Studies (FIMS). After the retirement of Manjunath Pendakur in 2000, Ross stepped in as dean of FIMS. In 2002, Ross and Kirsti Nilsen were named the winners of the 2002 Reference Service Press Award for their article "Has the Internet Changed Anything in Reference? The Library Visit Study, Phase 2". In 2007, Ross stepped down as dean; she was the recipient of the Award for Professional Contribution to Library and Information Science Education in 2008. In 2009, Ross was one of the first inductees into the Special Interest Group on Information Needs, Seeking, and Use Academy of the Association for Information Science and Technology. She retired from teaching in 2010.

In 2013, Ross was the recipient of the NoveList's Margaret E. Munroe Award for her “significant contributions to library adult services.” In 2015, her book Shapes in Math, Science and Nature: Squares, Triangles and Circles was shortlisted for the Information Book Award by the Children's Literature Roundtables of Canada.

In 2018, Ross was elected a Fellow of the Royal Society of Canada.

== Death ==
Ross died of biliary cancer in London, Ontario, on September 11, 2021.

== Publications ==
Ross's publications include:

- Conducting the reference interview: a how-to-do-it manual for librarians (2019)
- Reading still matters: what the research reveals about reading, libraries, and community (2018)
- Shapes in math, science and nature: squares, triangles and circles (2014)
- The pleasures of reading: a booklover's alphabet (2014)
- Communicating professionally: a how-to-do-it manual (2013)
- Alice Munro: a double life (1992)
- The amazing milk book (1991)
