= Alix Renaud =

Canadian writer (1945–2021)

- Born: 30 August 1945; Port-au-Prince, Haiti
- Died: 11 April 2021 (aged 75)
- Occupation: Writer

Alix Renaud (30 August 1945 – 11 April 2021) was a Haitian-born Canadian writer. He was the son of Joseph M. Renaud and Béatrice Black. He was a professor of oral expression and diction, and he was the inventor of the word pompion, the French (les) pompiers ont ("firefighters have") to describe the agglotination of some words. He became a member of the Fédération professionnelle des journalistes du Québec in 2010.

== Distinctions ==
- Lauréat du prix Charles-Biddle (2007)
- Prix de l'Institut canadien de Québec (2012)

== Publications ==
=== Novels ===
- Le Mari (1980)
- Merdiland, Le Temps parallèle (1983)
- Dix secondes de sursis, La liberté et Le Temps parallèle (1983)
- À corps joie (1985)
- Snesnob (1987)
- Compère Jacques Soleil (1998)
- Ovation (1999)
- Grand Roi et Petit Fou (2009)
- Traverses (2010)
- La femme avant Ève (2011)

=== Linguistics ===
- Dictionnaire de l'audiophonie (1981)
- Dictionnaire anglais-français des additifs alimentaires (1990)
- Pale kreyòl (1993)
- Tande kreyòl la byen (1998)
- Mots étrangers, mots français (2006)
- Sudoku-mots (2007)

=== Poetry ===
- Le Troc mystérieux (1970)
- Carême (1972)
- De ma fenêtre... (1974)
- Exase exacte (1976)
- Grâces (1976)
- Dulcamara (1992)
- Chair bohème (2009)
