= Jean-Claude Dionne =

Canadian geographer (1935–2021)

- Born: 3 January 1935; Sainte-Luce, Quebec, Canada
- Died: 27 June 2021 (aged 86); Quebec City, Quebec, Canada
- Occupation(s): Geographer; Professor

Jean-Claude Dionne (3 January 1935 – 27 June 2021) was a Canadian geographer and geomorphologist. He studied at the Université de Moncton, the Université de Montréal, and Paris Sorbonne University and was a professor emeritus of the Université Laval.

== Honors ==
- Médaille André Cailleux (1992)
- Prix de l'Association canadienne des géographes (1994)
- Special Numéro spécial de la revue Géographie physique et quaternaire (1996)
