= Umberto Bruni =

Canadian artist (1914–2021)

- Born: 24 November 1914; Montreal, Quebec, Canada
- Died: 1 February 2021 (aged 106); Laval, Quebec, Canada
- Occupation: Artist
- Known for: Director, Académie Internationale des Beaux-Arts du Québec

Umberto Bruni (24 November 1914 – 1 February 2021) was a Canadian artist and painter. He served as director of the Académie Internationale des Beaux-Arts du Québec.

== Biography ==
Bruni was born in Montreal to an Italian family. He learned how to decorate murals and stained glass at the age of 13 after studying Guido Nincheri. He studied at the École des beaux-arts de Montréal from 1930 to 1938. He was also a teacher at the Académie Querbes in Outremont from 1939 to 1969. In 1972, he became curator of the gallery at the Université du Québec à Montréal. During the restoration of painting in the National Assembly of Quebec in 1975, a painting of Philippe-Honoré Roy was found to be missing, so Bruni was tasked with its re-creation, which would be completed in 1980 using photographs. He was famous for designing many Catholic buildings across Quebec and for creating a bust of André Bessette. He has also painted portraits for many organisations and specialised in oil paintings. He held personal expositions at the Maison des Arts de Laval and the Centre Leonardo Da Vinci. He was a notable individual present at the opening of the Québec Government Office in Paris in 1961. He was a member of the International Institute for Conservation and the Royal Canadian Academy of Arts.

Umberto Bruni died in Laval on 1 February 2021 at the age of 106.

== Collections ==
- National Assembly of Quebec
- Université de Montréal
- Séminaire de Québec
- Saint Joseph's Oratory
- Musée des hospitalières de l'Hotel Dieu de Montréal
- Musée régional de Vaudreuil-Soulanges
