= Michel Girouard =

Canadian journalist (1944–2021)

Michel Girouard (August 22, 1944 – April 9, 2021) was a Quebec journalist.

== Biography ==
Girouard was born in Outremont, Quebec (now a borough of Montreal). During his childhood, Michel Girouard participated in Les ondes enfantines, which was broadcast on CBC Television. At the age of 17, he was asked to become editor of the weekly La Patrie, which targeted young people. With Joël Denis, he also co-hosted the CKAC radio program "Salut les copains" that focused on youth.

In the following years, Michel Girouard launched some 45 rpm recordings, including:

- School and love
- You who were my friend
- The big day
- Arm in arm

On February 18, 1972, Michel Girouard and the pianist Réjean Tremblay got married while same-sex marriage was still not recognized in Canada. Radio host Hughette Proulx publicly defended it. Since then, Michel became an artistic columnist in several television shows like The Garden of Stars. Always accompanied by his dogs, he is a spokesperson for Pattes de l'espoir, which is a march-o-thon with dogs in order to raise funds for the fight against cancer.
