= Maurice Joncas =

Canadian writer (1936–2021)

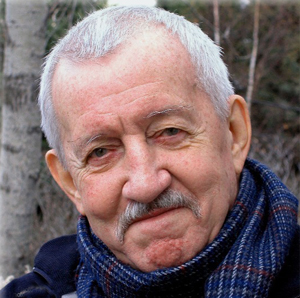
- Joncas in 2005
- Born: 26 June 1936; Pointe-Jaune, Quebec, Canada
- Died: 13 June 2021 (aged 84); Gaspé, Quebec, Canada
- Occupation: Writer

Maurice Joncas (26 June 1936 – 13 June 2021) was a Canadian writer.

== Biography ==
In 1968, Joncas began participating in numerous shows as a director, actor, and producer. The following year, he was a founding member of the Théâtre de l'Astran de Gaspé. A multidisciplinary artist known throughout the Gaspé Peninsula, he also practiced singing and painting. He made a career as a secondary school French teacher and retired in 1996.

Maurice Joncas died in Gaspé on 13 June 2021 at the age of 84.

== Novels ==
- La chevauchée des pèlerins : Entre la mer et l'exil (2001)
- La chevauchée des pèlerins : La route des rêves (2002)
- La chevauchée des pèlerins : Échec et mat (2004)
- Le petit garçon qui cherchait son âme (2006)
- Le dernier repas (2008)

== Poetry ==
- D'or... de sang... de bronze... (1991)
- Images et mirages - écrits de l'anse (1993)
- Eaux-delà - vingt-six chants d'amour en prose (1997)
- Hyperborée (1999)
- L'espérance retrouvée (1999)
- L'oiseau couché sur son aile (2000)
- Cantilènes et chants de mer (2005)

== Stories ==
- Chroniques d'enfance - nouveaux écrits de l'anse (1996)
- Le vieil homme de la colline (2006)

== Distinctions ==
- Citation Chorale de l'Alliance des chorales du Québec (1988)
- Prix Mérite Culturel Gaspésien (1988)
- Prix Gasp'Art Culture (1994)
- Médaille d'argent de l'Ordre du Mérite octroyé par la Fédération des Commissions scolaires du Québec (1996)
