= Toronto French School =

Independent school in Toronto, Ontario, Canada

Coordinates: 43.728°N 79.383°W

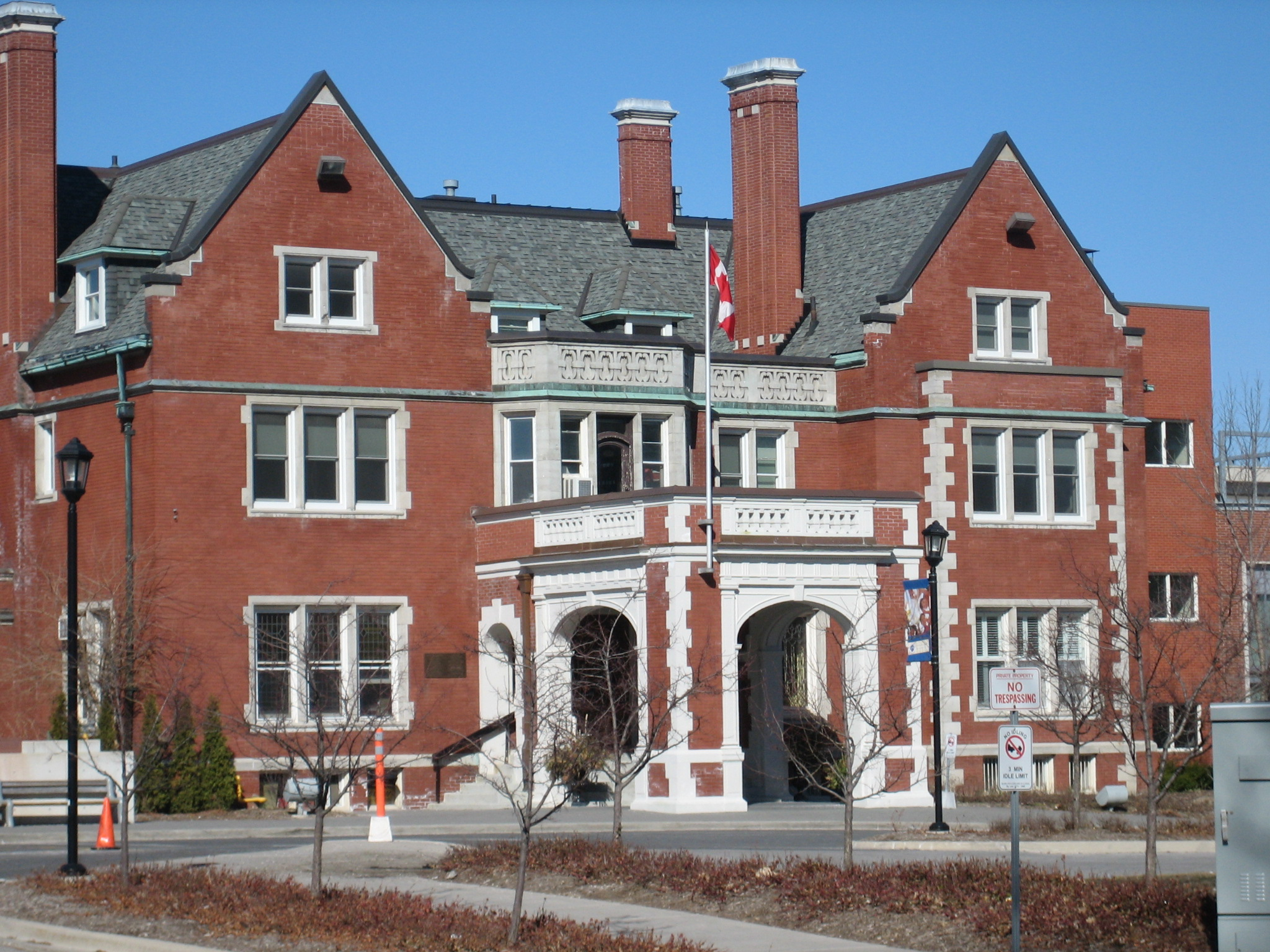

Location
- 306 Lawrence Avenue East; Toronto, Ontario, M4N 1T7; Canada

Information
- School type: Independent day school
- Motto: Êtres humains qui réfléchissent, citoyens qui agissent (Individuals who reflect, citizens who act)
- Established: 1962
- Founder: Harry Giles
- Head of School: Jean-Bastien Urfels
- Faculty: 200
- Grades: Jardin d'éveil (age 2) to Grade 12
- Enrollment: 1500
- Language: Primarily French
- Campus: Toronto Campus/Mississauga Campus (30-acre (0.12 km^{2}), urban and forest, Toronto Campus)
- Houses: 6
- Colours: Blue, White and Red
- Mascot: Cougar
- Team name: TFS Cougars
- Website: www.tfs.ca

Toronto French School (TFS), founded in 1962, is an independent, bilingual, co-educational, non-denominational school in Toronto, Ontario, Canada. Charles III, as King of Canada, is the royal patron of the school. The school rebranded in 2011 to become TFS – Canada's International School.

At TFS, students complete the International Baccalaureate (IB) program, including the Primary Years (PYP), Middle Years (MYP) and Diploma Programs (DP), in addition to the National Curriculum of France and the Ontario Ministry of Education curriculum. It is compulsory for students to study under the International Baccalaureate program in their final two years. Prior to this, students between the ages of 2 and 15 go through a bilingual program covering the arts, languages, natural and social sciences as well as mathematics. The school offers extracurricular programs, leadership opportunities, as well as international trips and exchanges.

== History ==
The Toronto French School was co-founded as a non-profit school on August 9, 1962, by Harry Giles and his wife, Anna Por. with the objective of educating students to become fully bilingual Canadians. The school began as an experiment in home schooling, and its first classes took place in rented church basements.

In its first class on September 7, 1962, the school was teaching sixteen 3–5 year old under Mme. Nicole Corbi. Four years later, the Toronto French School operated six locations across the GTA and surrounding areas, including the Mississauga Campus still in use today.

In 1979, the school was granted Royal Patronage under Her Majesty the Queen Elizabeth II.

In 1980, the school acquired 318 Lawrence Avenue, the former Sifton Manor, and made the 26-acre (110,000 m^{2}) plot of land its new primary location. The historic home was originally built in 1922 for Sir Clifford Sifton, and it was initially named "Armadale" in honour of his wife, Elizabeth Arma Burrows, Lady Sifton.

In 1984, the board of directors included Liberal politician Jean Chrétien (later Prime Minister of Canada), and a patrons' council was created with prominent names Bata, Black, Labat, and Eaton.. John Godfrey, a former Liberal Member of Parliament (MP) and Cabinet Minister, was headmaster from 2008 until June 2014. Under his leadership, the school rebranded as "TFS – Canada's International School" to better reflect the international nature of the bilingual school.

In November 2014, the school settled a $1.6 million lawsuit by two Muslim former students who sued for defamation due to the school's handling of a 2008 incident in which the pair were involved in an altercation after they had been subjected to racial slurs. The school apologized for its role in the affair. The former students also agreed in writing that none of the defendants admitted any misconduct in the events giving rise to the litigation.

TFS parents include the film director Atom Egoyan and his actor wife Arsinée Khanjian, the journalist Jan Wong, the Ontario Court of Appeal judge John Laskin, Dr. Ann Kaplan Mulholland (star of The Real Housewives of Toronto), and the former city councilor Tom Jakobek.

Graduates attend Canada's universities, and several TFS students every year pursue study at America's Ivy League universities, Oxford, Cambridge or the London School of Economics in Britain. A small number of students pursue study in France, and some past TFS graduates have studied at the Université Panthéon Sorbonne and the Institut d'études politiques de Paris (Sciences Po) in Paris.

In 2026, Jean-Bastien Urfels was appointed Head of School, succeeding Norman Gaudet.

== Campus Locations and Facilities ==
Although TFS facilities were scattered in different areas, by the mid-eighties, the school had condensed to two locations, one in Toronto (Bayview and Lawrence) and one in Mississauga (1293 Meredith Avenue – south of The Queensway, between Dixie and Cawthra - former Lakeview Central/Neil C. Mathewson Junior Public School c. 1950.

The Toronto location acquired the old Sifton Estate (Armadale), a group of three patrician Tudor-revival/Dutch Colonial Revival architecture brick buildings on nearly 23 acres. It was designed by McGiffin and Smith and completed by Smith and Everett. The Sifton Estate was once occupied by Sir Clifford Sifton, a cabinet minister who served in prime minister Sir Wilfrid Laurier's government, and Lady Sifton, and it was used as a vacation home ideal for fox hunting. The Sifton mansion, now called Giles Hall, is the main building of TFS's senior school.

The TFS Toronto campus, situated at the corner of Bayview and Lawrence, is nestled between the stately houses of Lawrence Park and the Bridle Path. A major expansion of the senior school - including the addition of La Terrasse, a new gymnasium and a 25-metre swimming pool - was undertaken in stages through the 2000s and completed in 2010, designed by Raymond Moriyama and Teshima architects.

In addition, in 2008 TFS inaugurated a 4500 m2 main sports field consisting of synthetic solar AstroTurf, encircled with a combination of stone and metal fencing. The field has a 1 km long drainage system that runs underneath, allowing it to rapidly soak up and drain away large amounts of water. The field was renamed Terrain Frazer Field in 2019 in honor of then-outgoing Board Chair, Mitch Frazer.

As of 2026, the school in the midst of an expansion. In September 2026, a new Athletic Centre was opened at the West Campus, along with a viewing gallery, a design studio, new school entrance, and upgraded classrooms. At the Toronto campus, construction began on a new four-storey addition known as L’Atelier, set to open in 2029, which will include a 360-seat auditorium, a design studio, music wing, three additional classrooms and rooftop terrace.

== Student body ==
TFS is an independent co-ed school with 1,500 day students. Over ninety percent of students joining the school are non-native French speakers. In the case of students with no prior knowledge of French, there is a one-year intensive Introductory French program available for new incoming students from JK to Grade 7.

From Pre-Kindergarten to Grade 7, students attend at either TFS's Toronto or Mississauga campuses. From Grade 8 onward, TFS students in the Mississauga area have the option of taking a private shuttle bus to and from the Toronto Campus. All students study the International Baccalaureate (IB) diploma programme during Grades Eleven and Twelve (Levels IV and V).

=== Charity events ===
TFS takes part charitable and community activities throughout the year. The school has ties to the Terry Fox Foundation, and has held a Terry Fox run every year since 1994. This has raised more than $500,000.

== Academic program ==
Students are taught mainly in French from pre-kindergarten through Grade 10. At the Toronto campus, a licensed early childhood education program, Jardin d’éveil, is offered for students from 20 months to age 2, with a focus on stimulating learning and introducing French through a range of play activities.

The school is accredited by the Ministry of Education of France through Grade 10 and by the Ministry of Education of Ontario throughout its entire range.

TFS completes the elementary school program in seven years, covering the normal Ontario Grades 6, 7 and 8 curriculum in two years (Grades 6 and 7), while maintaining a five-year high school instead of the Ontario's standard four-year Grade 9-12 model. In this way, TFS maintains the provincial norm of 12 total years of schooling, but dedicates the last five of these years to preparing students for OSSD and the completion of the requirements of the International Brevet and the IB Diploma.

=== High School ===
Grades Eight to Twelve are split into Levels I to V. In Level I, students are prepared for the French Brevet Diploma through greater emphasis on the French curricula in the Social Sciences, French and Math. By the end of that year, all students wishing to attempt to get the Brevet Diploma will have done several practice tests known as the "Brevet Blanc". In the next year, Level II, they will then be able to take part in the official Brevet Exam. Typically, over 95% of TFS students attempting the International Brevet will pass.[14]

From Level III (Grade 11) onward, TFS students have the option of doing the majority of their courses in either English or French, as they complete both their OSSD and IB Diploma requirements. In Level III, students are introduced to the way in which IB classes will work. They are taught how to do proper IB labs in the three Science classes, how to write IB commentaries in their Language classes and are given the basics that they will need for IB Mathematics.

All students study French throughout all of their years at the school. Students may study Latin, Spanish, or German as well. TFS requires its students to enroll in the International Baccalaureate Diploma (an externally moderated curriculum offered by the International Baccalaureate Organization (IBO)) and also offers, and recommends the Brevet des collèges. Examinations are taken in May of students' graduating year.

== Notable alumni ==
- Justin Poy, creative media and advertising entrepreneur
- Julia Bentley, Canadian High Commissioner to Malaysia
- Celeste Yim, comedian and writer for Saturday Night Live

== See also ==
- Education in Ontario
- List of secondary schools in Ontario
