= 2021 North Vancouver stabbing =

Mass stabbing in Canada

2021 North Vancouver stabbing attack
- Location: Lynn Valley Library, North Vancouver, British Columbia, Canada
- Date: March 27, 2021
- Attack type: Mass stabbing
- Deaths: 1
- Injuries: 6
- Perpetrator: Yannick Bandaogo
- Motive: Under investigation

On March 27, 2021, one person was killed and six others were injured in a mass stabbing at the Lynn Valley Library in North Vancouver, British Columbia, Canada. A man named Yannick Bandaogo was arrested and charged with second-degree murder. In September 2021, he was additionally charged with one count of aggravated assault and five counts of attempted murder. Bandaogo did not know any of his victims. On May 29, 2023, he pleaded guilty to all of the charges. On August 31, 2023, he was sentenced to life imprisonment without the possibility of parole for 15 years.
