= Monte Lake, British Columbia =

Monte Lake
- Location within Thompson-Nicola Regional District Location within British Columbia
- Coordinates: 50°32′00″N 119°50′00″W
- Country: Canada
- Province: British Columbia
- Regional district: Thompson-Nicola
- Electoral area: Electoral Area L (Grasslands)

Monte Lake is an unincorporated, seasonally inhabited community located at the north end of the lake of the same name. It lies in a valley connecting the Thompson Country to the Okanagan region in the south-central Interior of British Columbia, Canada. The area has a negligible permanent population, and is not considered a designated place by Statistics Canada, but seasonal residents can number nearly 3,000. On 5th and 6th August 2021, the community was destroyed by the White Rock Lake fire.

== See also ==
- Monte Lake Provincial Park
- Monte Creek, British Columbia
- List of communities in British Columbia
- White Rock Lake fire
