= BC Wildfire Service =

Wildfire suppression service of British Columbia, Canada

Operational area
- Country: Canada
- Province: British Columbia
- Address: Victoria, British Columbia

Agency overview
- Established: 1912
- Staffing: Career
- Fire chief: Ian Meier

Facilities and equipment
- Divisions: 4 crew divisions

Website
- BC Wildfire Service

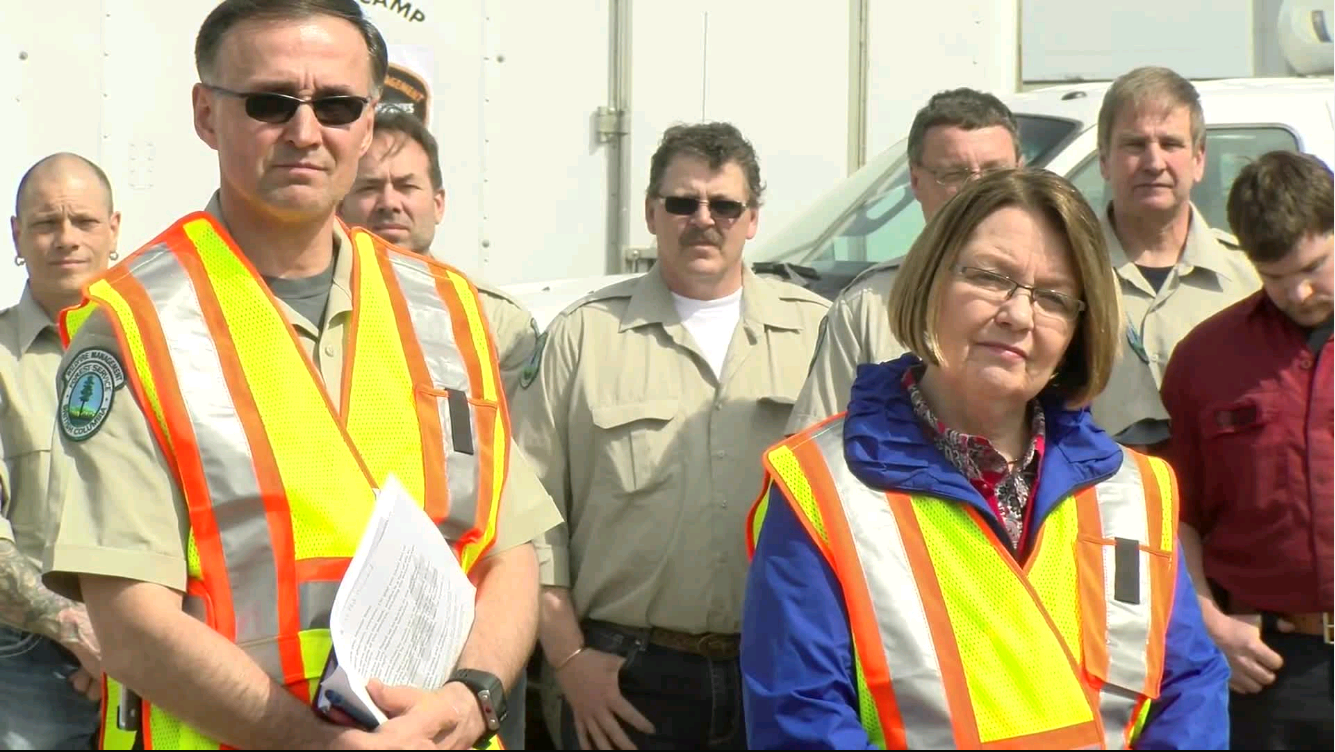
BC Wildfire Service personnel in 2016

BC Wildfire Service (BCWS) is the wildfire suppression service of the Canadian province of British Columbia. It is an element of the Ministry of Forests.

== Operations ==
For suppression purposes, the BCWS divides the province of British Columbia into six regional fire centres, each of which is responsible for managing wildfire response within its boundaries. These fire centres are in turn divided into local fire zones. Provincial level activities are managed by the Provincial Wildfire Coordination Centre in Kamloops and the BCWS Headquarters in Victoria.

== Crews ==
The BC Wildfire Service employs four types of wildfire suppression crews throughout the province. All BCWS firefighters are classified as Type 1 firefighters.

- Initial Attack (IA) Crews Four-person crews which are usually the first to arrive to a newly reported wildfire. IA Crews respond to the majority of fires in British Columbia.
- Rapattack Crews Rappel-capable crews which respond to fires in inaccessible terrain. Rapattack firefighters rappel from a helicopter in close proximity to a fire. They may also construct helipads so that larger amounts of equipment and personnel may be brought to the fire.
- Parattack Crews Also known as smokejumpers, these firefighters parachute from fixed-wing aircraft, which allows the rapid deployment of several firefighters over great distances. Parattack crews are most utilized in the northeastern part of British Columbia.
- Unit Crews 20 person crews specializing in larger fires that have grown beyond initial attack capabilities. Unit crews oftentimes live in temporary fire camps and work for up to fourteen days at a time.

Once a fire is deemed contained, Type 2 firefighters, also known as contract crews, may be used to "mop-up" and patrol a fire to extinguish any remaining fire activity. All Type 2 firefighters in British Columbia are private contractors retained by the provincial government.

== Aviation ==
The agency pioneered the use of Automated Flight Following for fire helicopters in the 1980s. BC contracts out aerial firefighting to Conair Group of Abbotsford, British Columbia and Air Spray of Red Deer, Alberta, rather than maintaining its own flight staff and equipment.
