= Italian Osteria Scene, Girl Welcoming a Person Entering =

1847 painting by Wilhelm Marstrand

- Italiensk osteriscene. Pige, der byder den indtrædende velkommen (Danish)
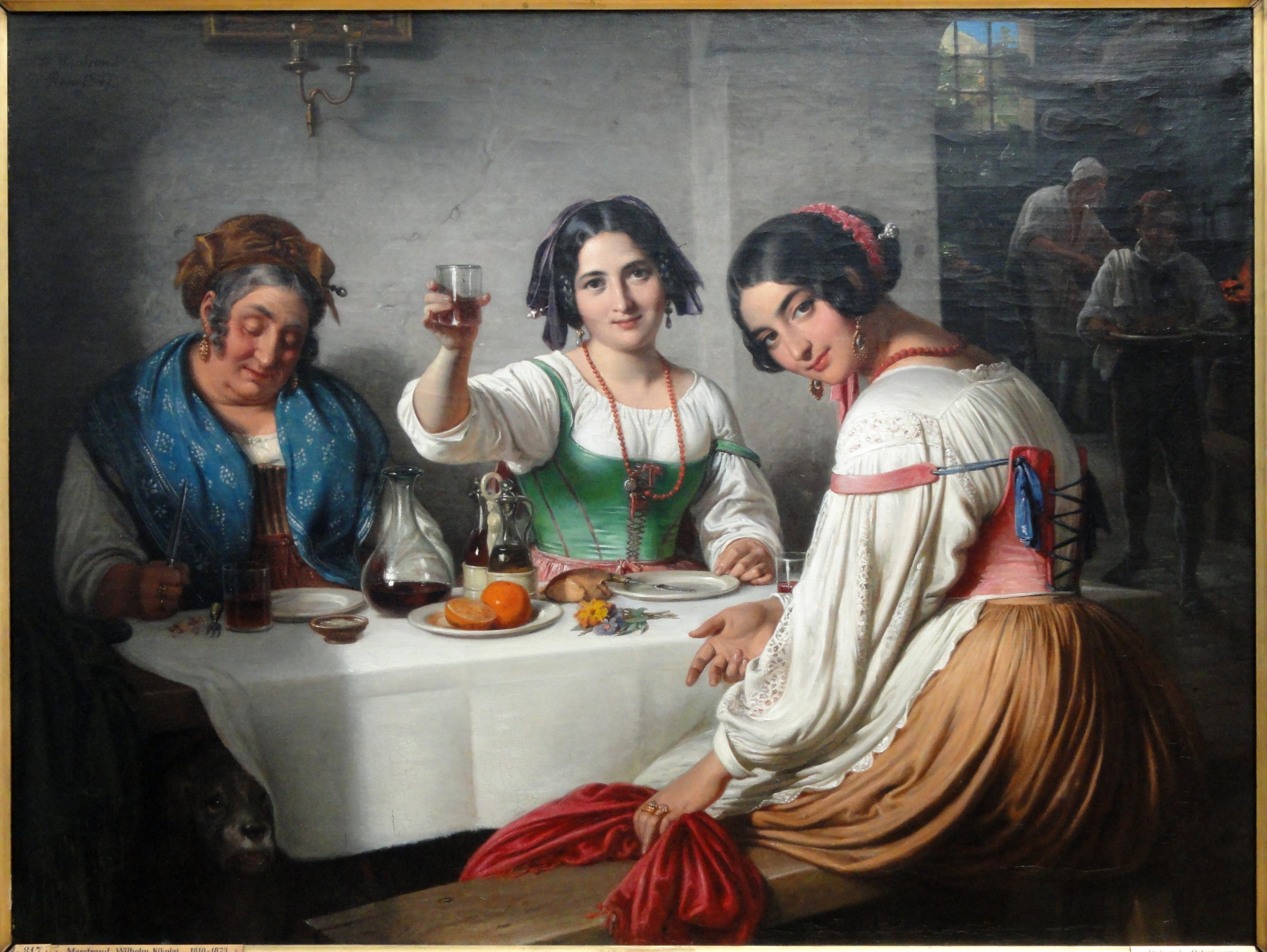
- Artist: Wilhelm Marstrand
- Year: 1847
- Medium: oil on canvas
- Dimensions: 123 cm × 165 cm (48 in × 65 in)
- Location: Ny Carlsberg Glyptotek, Copenhagen

Italian Osteria Scene, Girl Welcoming a Person Entering (Danish: Italiensk osteriscene. Pige, der byder den indtrædende velkommen) is an 1847 oil on canvas painting by Wilhelm Marstrand, now in the collection of the Ny Carlsberg Glyptotek in Copenhagen. The painting served as inspiration for Carl Bloch's In a Roman Osteria (1866, Danish National Gallery).

== History ==
Marstrand first visited Rome in 1836 and stayed until 1840. In 1845 he returned to Italy and resided there until 1849. He painted the Italian osteria scene in 1847. The painting was acquired by Jacob Scavenius. On 14 December 1894, it was sold as part of an auction of Scavenius' estate. The buyer was Carl Jacobsen and the painting was subsequently included in the collection of the Ny Carlsberg Glyptotek.

== Description ==
The painting depicts two young Italian women and their sleeping chaperone mother seated at a table in an osteria. One of the girls is raising her glass and making eye contact to welcome another person entering the restaurant. Her sister has her back turned at the viewer but is looking across her left shoulder to see who is entering and is also making eye contact with the viewer. Both young women also have their corset straps slipping from their shoulders.

== Related works ==
Carl Bloch's In a Roman Osteria was painted with direct inspiration from Marstrand's painting. Moritz G. Melchior, who had commissioned the work, had specifically requested a painting similar to that of Marstrand's Italian osteria scene. Elisabeth Jerichau-Baumann has also painted an osteria scene with inspiration from Marstrand's painting.

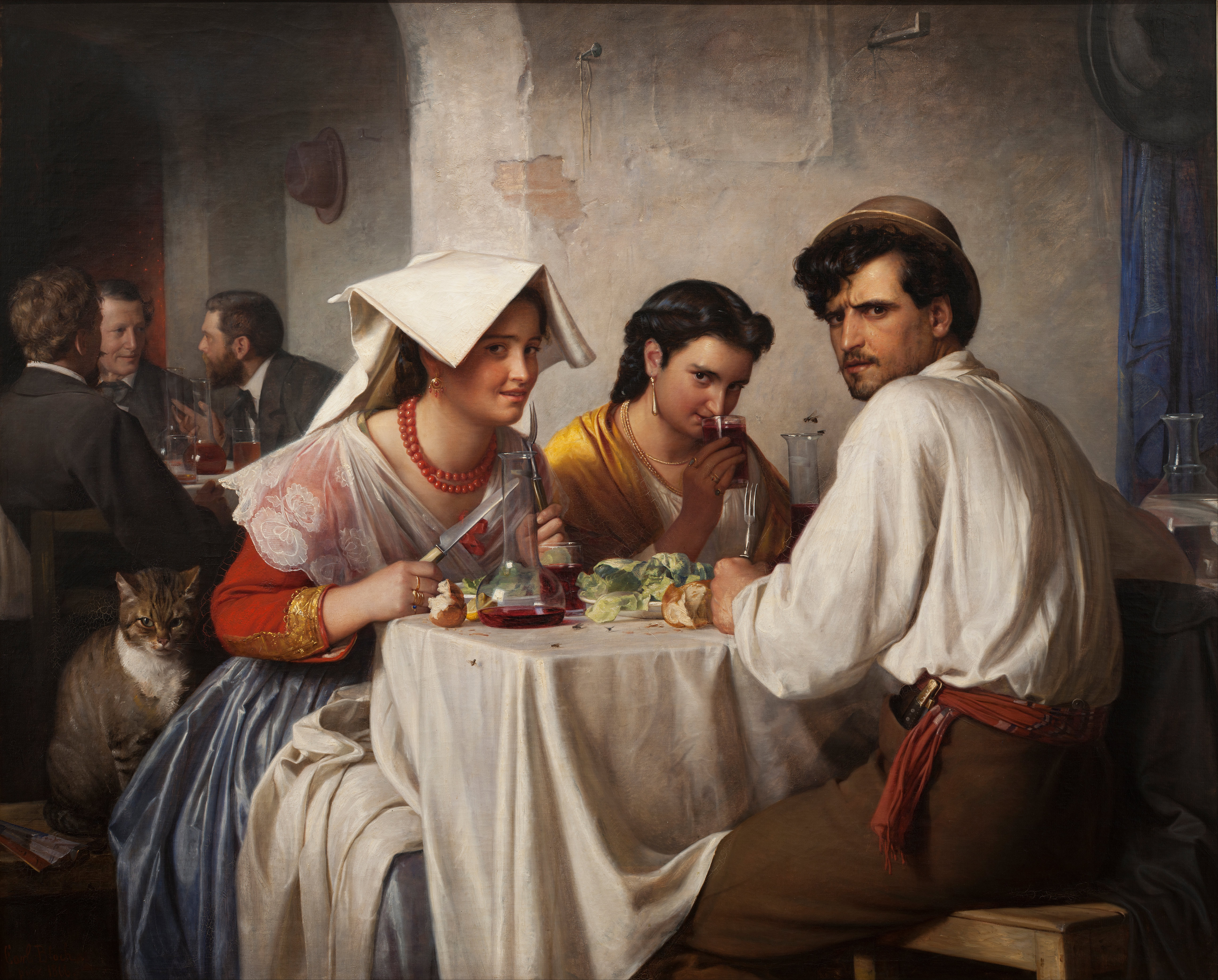
Carl Bloch: In a Roman Osteria, Danish National Gallery, 1866

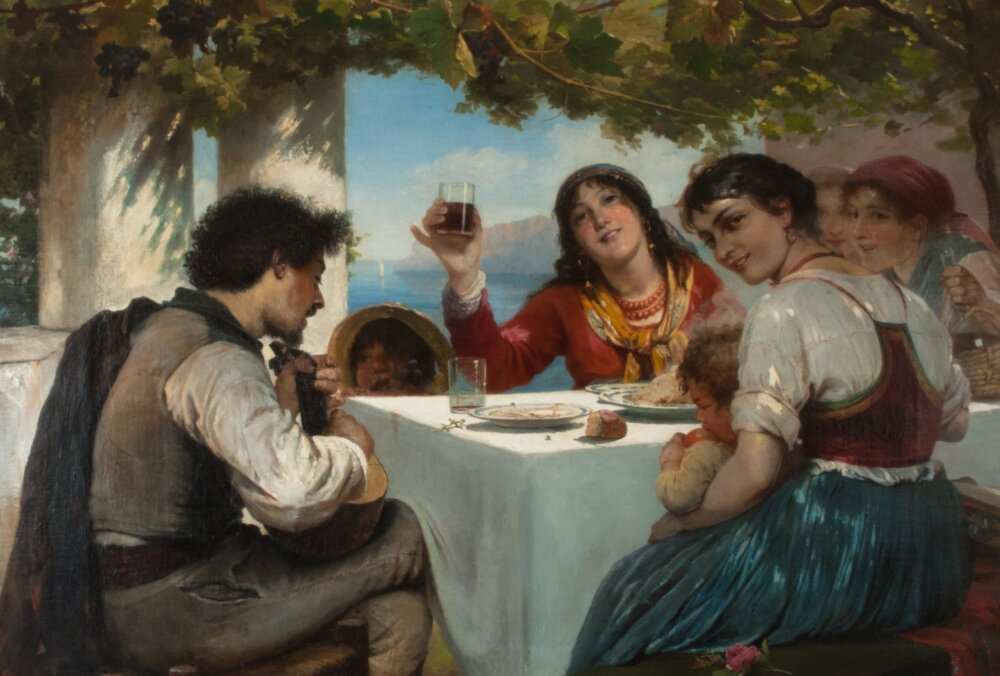
Elisabeth Jerichau-Baumann's painting

== See also ==
- Church-Goers Arriving by Boat at the Parish Church of Leksand on Siljan Lake
