= Osteria del Cappello =

Hotel and restaurant in Bologna, Italy

The "Osteria Del Cappello" (lit. Inn of the Hat) or "Al Cappello Rosso" (lit. to the Red Hat) is an osteria and it is one of the oldest inns in Bologna in Italy, and it is still active today as a hotel and as a restaurant serving food and drinks. It is located in Via de’ Fusari, near Piazza Maggiore.

== History ==
The Bolognese historical archives, mention a "Hosteria del Cappello" in 1375. This Hosteria could have changed location many times until 1700. In fact the locations were not property of the host and, often, the symbol of the inn remained the same even though its location had changed. The current location of the Hostaria dates back to 1652, when host Domenico Simoncini decided to place the inn in Via de’ Fusari. The name comes from the sign: almost any kind of object, typically bells, keys, crowns, and hats (like in this case) could appear on a sign of an Italian tavern.

The hat of this Osteria, decorated with ribbons, was clearly linked to the Church, since it could represent the one of a prior or archbishop. This detail determined the colour of the banner, red, which was intended to remind the clergy of their willingness to shed their own blood for the Church. In the 15th century, Bologna's bishop Niccolò Albergati had already stated the importance of this tavern, also used as the only place, at the time located outside the city's walls, where the Jews who happened to pass through the city could stay.

In 1712, the Bolognese engraver Giuseppe Maria Mitelli included the Hostaria in the "Giuoco nuovo di tutte le osterie che sono in Bologna", with the same logo as nowadays. The sign of the tavern in the game occupies box #41, followed by the description of the tavern as a place where it is possible to eat "good partridges" finely larded, together with "croutons". The Osteria Del Cappello, together with the Osteria del Sole are the only inns of this old game to be still active in Bologna.

== See also ==
- Bologna
- Piazza Maggiore
- Trattoria
- Osteria
- Niccolò Albergati

== Bibliography ==
- Rezio Buscaroli, Agostino e Giuseppe Maria Mitelli, catalogo delle loro stampe nella Raccolta Gozzadini nella Biblioteca Comunale dell’Archiginnasio in Bologna, Zanichelli, Bologna 1931.
- Giuseppe Guidicini, Cose notabili della città di Bologna, ossia, Storia cronologica de' suoi stabili sacri, pubblici e privati, Forni, Sala Bolognese,1980
- Giancarlo Roversi, (a cura di), Bologna Ospitale. storia e storie degli alberghi della città dal Medioevo al Novecento, Costa, Bologna 2004.
