= In a Roman Osteria =

1866 painting by Carl Bloch

- Fra et romersk osteria (Danish)
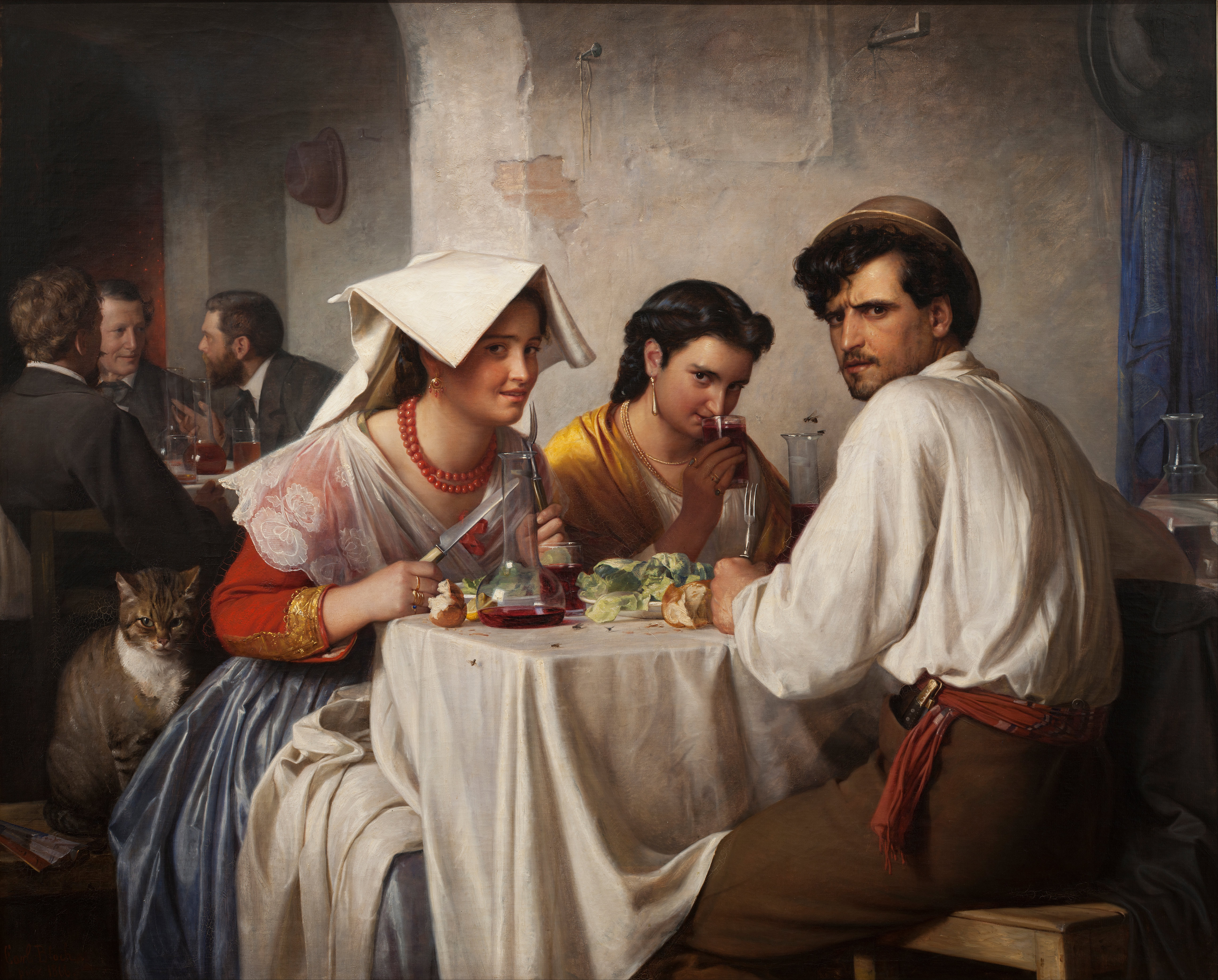
- Artist: Carl Bloch
- Year: 1866
- Medium: Oil on canvas
- Dimensions: 148.5 cm × 177.5 cm (58.5 in × 69.9 in)
- Location: National Gallery of Denmark; Copenhagen

In a Roman Osteria is an oil-on-canvas painting by the Danish painter Carl Bloch. It was painted in 1866. One of Bloch's better-known genre scenes, the painting was commissioned by the merchant Moritz G. Melchior, Bloch's friend and major supporter who is included in the background of the painting.

== History ==
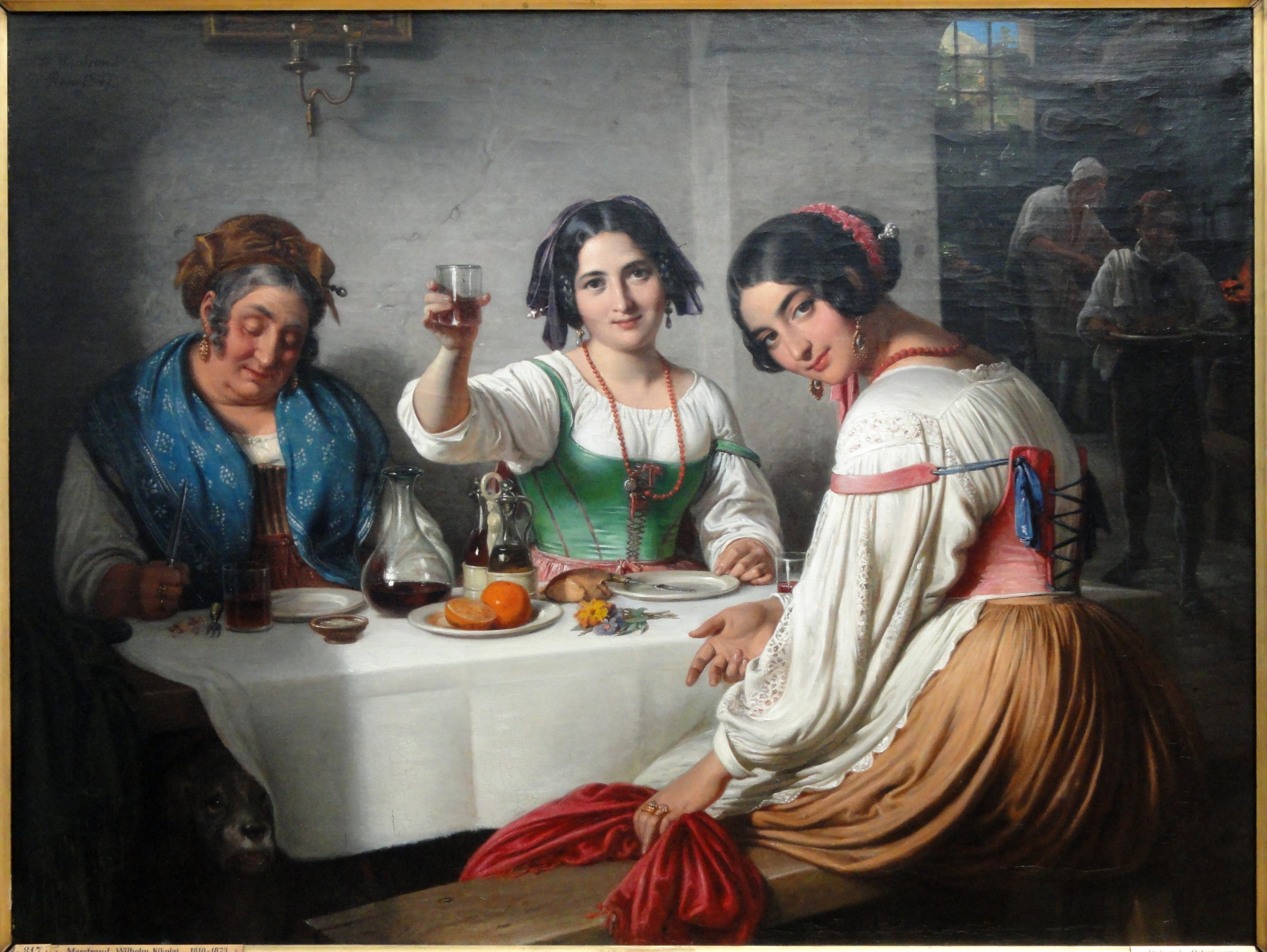
The painting owes an obvious debt to Wilhelm Marstrand's Italian Osteria Scene, Girl welcoming a Person entering from 1847

Carl Bloch was a personal friend of Moritz G. Melchior. He often visited the Melchior family for dinner on Thursdays in their home on the second floor at Højbro Plads 21. Other friends of the family, who would often also attend the Thursday Dinners, included the writer Hans Christian Andersen and the painter Frederik Christian Lund, poet and museum administrator Carl Andersen and representatives of the press such as Dagbladet editor C. St. A. Bille, journalists Robert Watt and P. "Cabiro" Hansen and publisher and editor of Fædrelandet ('The Fatherland') Carl Ploug.

Melchior commissioned the painting from Bloch in connection with a journey to Italy. He requested a painting similar to that of Wilhelm Marstrand's Italian Osteria Scene, Girl welcoming a Person entering (1847).

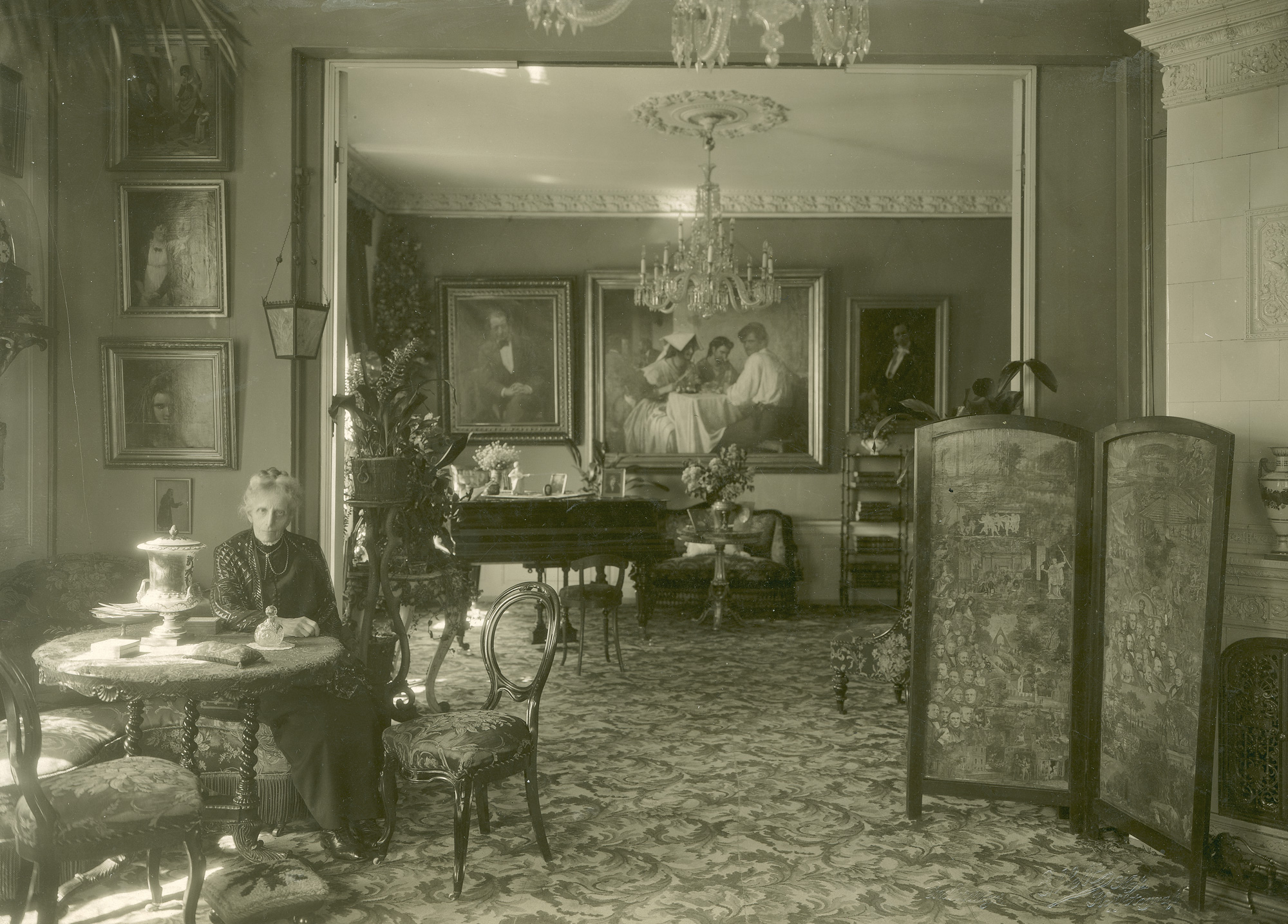
The painting seen on a photograph from Melchior's home in the Ploug House

The Polish-Danish painter Elisabeth Jerichau Baumann also made a version of the scene and there are at least three variations of that painting. The unframed oil on canvas measures 148.5 by 177.5 centimetres (58.5 by 69.9 in).

In 1884, Melchior bequeathed the painting to the Danish National Gallery. It was handed over to the museum following the death of Melchior's daughter Louise in 1935.

== Description ==
The setting is in the interior of a Roman osteria. In the forefront, there is a table with three customers: a young man is facing two young women. The one on the left of the man wears a headscarf in the typical garb of married Roman women at the time. The man is seen turning toward the onlooker with an angry expression, whereas the woman at his right is looking with a smiling one, and the (presumably slightly older) other woman looks amused in the same direction. A cat sits to the left of the young woman, silently judging the onlooker.

The painter depicted himself in the background, sitting at a table talking with two friends; his back is turned to the viewer.

== In popular culture ==
In April 2018, BBC Radio 1 DJ Greg James led a real-life recreation of the painting after his listeners discovered that he looked like the man in the painting. It was called the 'Radio 1 Paint-A-Long' and also included two listeners, Miriam and Harriet, who took the places of the women featured.
