= Osteria =

Wine and food establishment

An osteria (Italian: [osteˈriːa]) (Note: The first part of the word, oste, means 'innkeeper, landlord' and is a cognate of English host, both having been borrowed from the Old French oste, 'innkeeper, landlord, host'.) in Italy was originally a place serving wine and simple food. Lately, the emphasis has shifted to the food, but menus tend to be short, with the emphasis on local specialities such as pasta and grilled meat or fish, often served at shared tables. Osterie tend to be cheap, and they also focus on after work and evening refreshment. Osterie vary greatly in practice: some only serve drinks and clients are allowed to bring in their own food, others have retained a predominantly male clientele, while still others have reached out to students and young professionals. Some provide music and other entertainment. Similar to osterie are bottiglierie, where customers can take a bottle or flask to be re-filled from a barrel, and enoteche, which generally pride themselves on the range and quality of their wine. In Emilia-Romagna there are located three of the oldest Italian osterie: "Osteria del Sole" and "Osteria del Cappello" in Bologna, and "Osteria al Brindisi" in Ferrara, established between the 14th and 15th centuries.

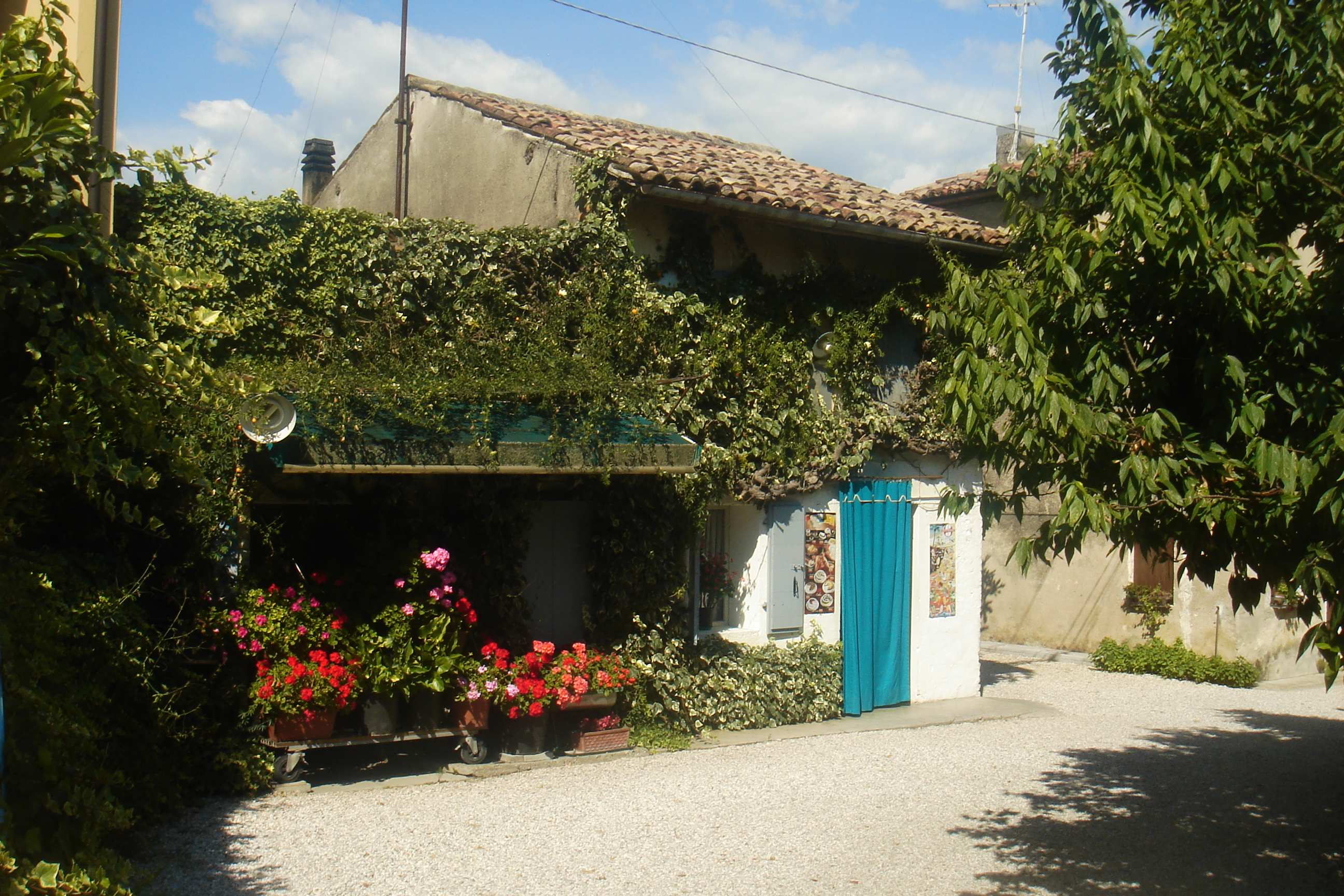
Garden of a typical osteria in Castello Roganzuolo, Veneto, Italy

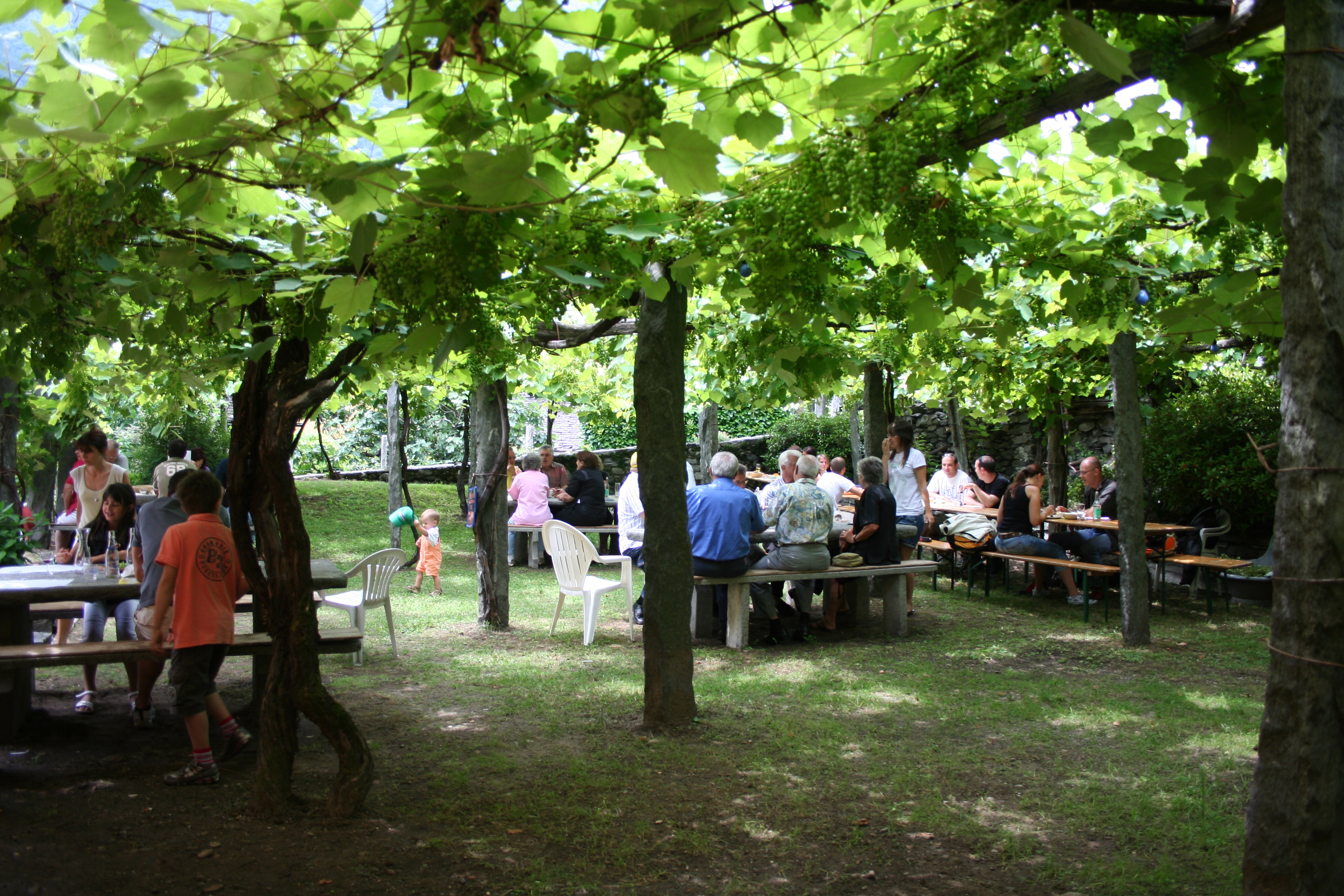
Garden of an osteria in Giumaglio, in the Italian-speaking Canton Ticino, Switzerland

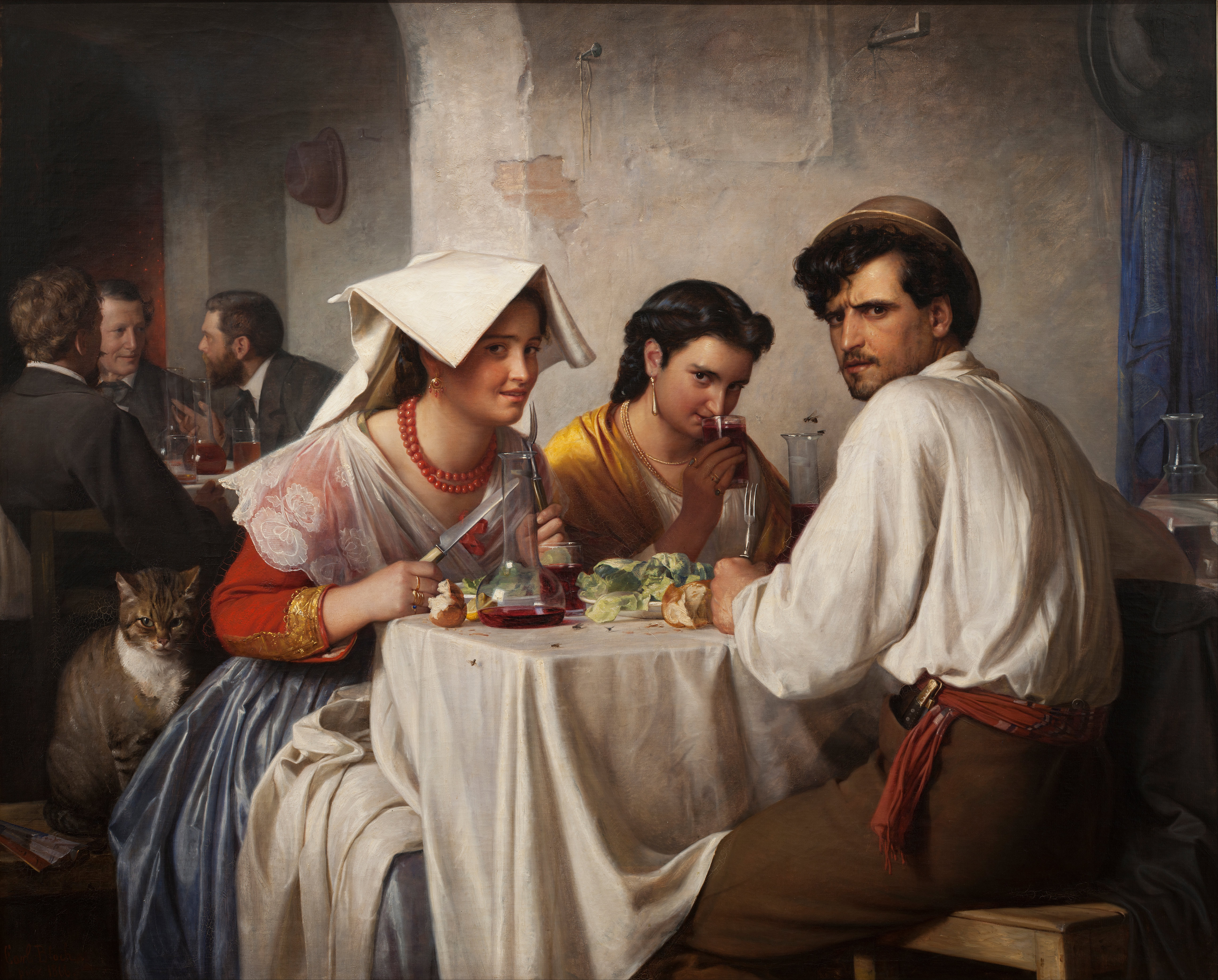
Osteria in art: Carl Bloch's 1866 painting In a Roman Osteria from the National Gallery of Denmark, Copenhagen

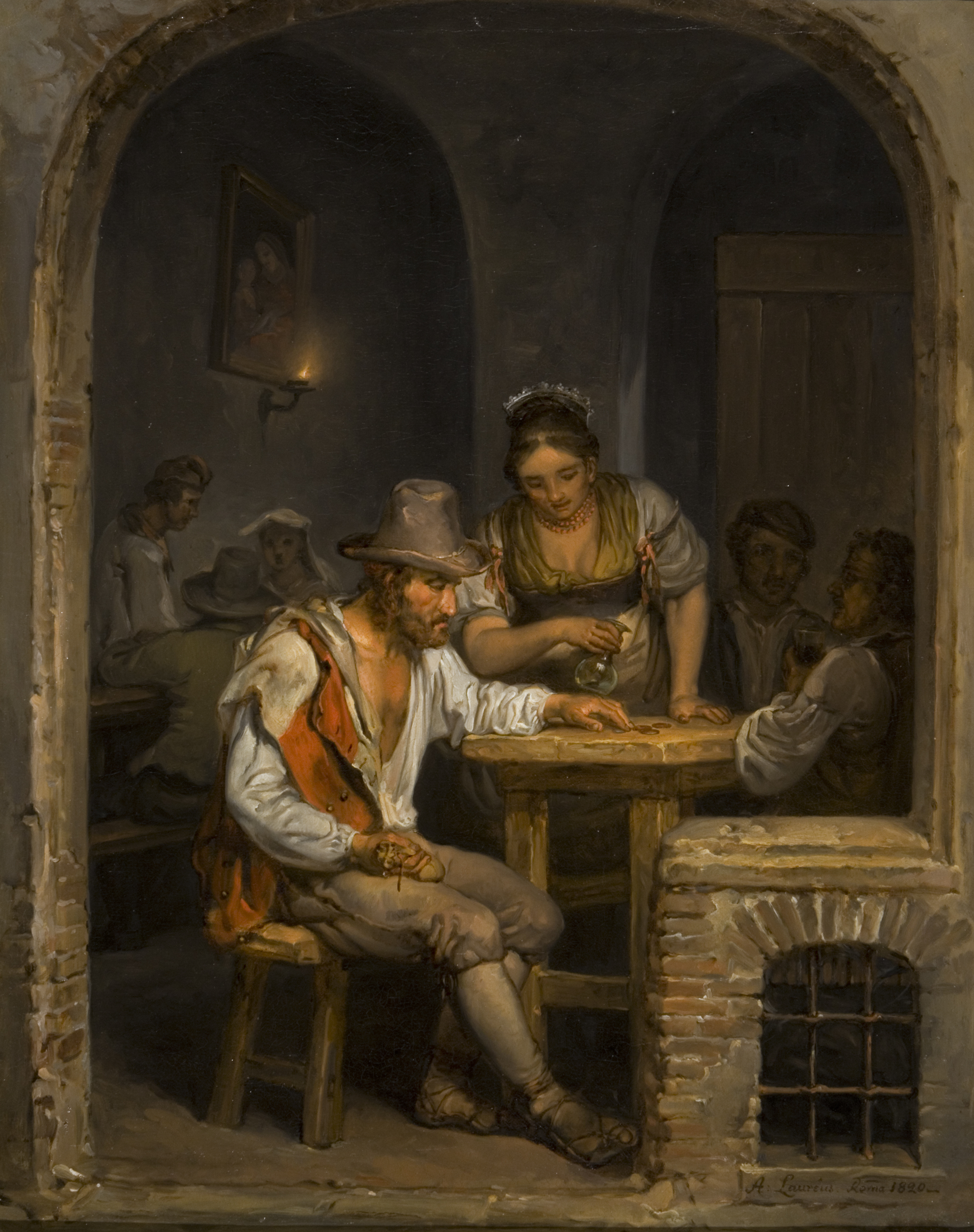
Osteria in art: Aleksander Lauréus (1793–1823) oil painting from 1820, Roman Osteria from Pori Art Museum (Finnish: Porin taidemuseo, Swedish: Björneborgs konstmuseum). Pori Art Museum is a museum of contemporary and modern art museum in Pori (Swedish: Björneborg), Finland.

== See also ==
- Trattoria
