= Prometheus Unbound (Carl Bloch) =

1864 painting by Carl Bloch

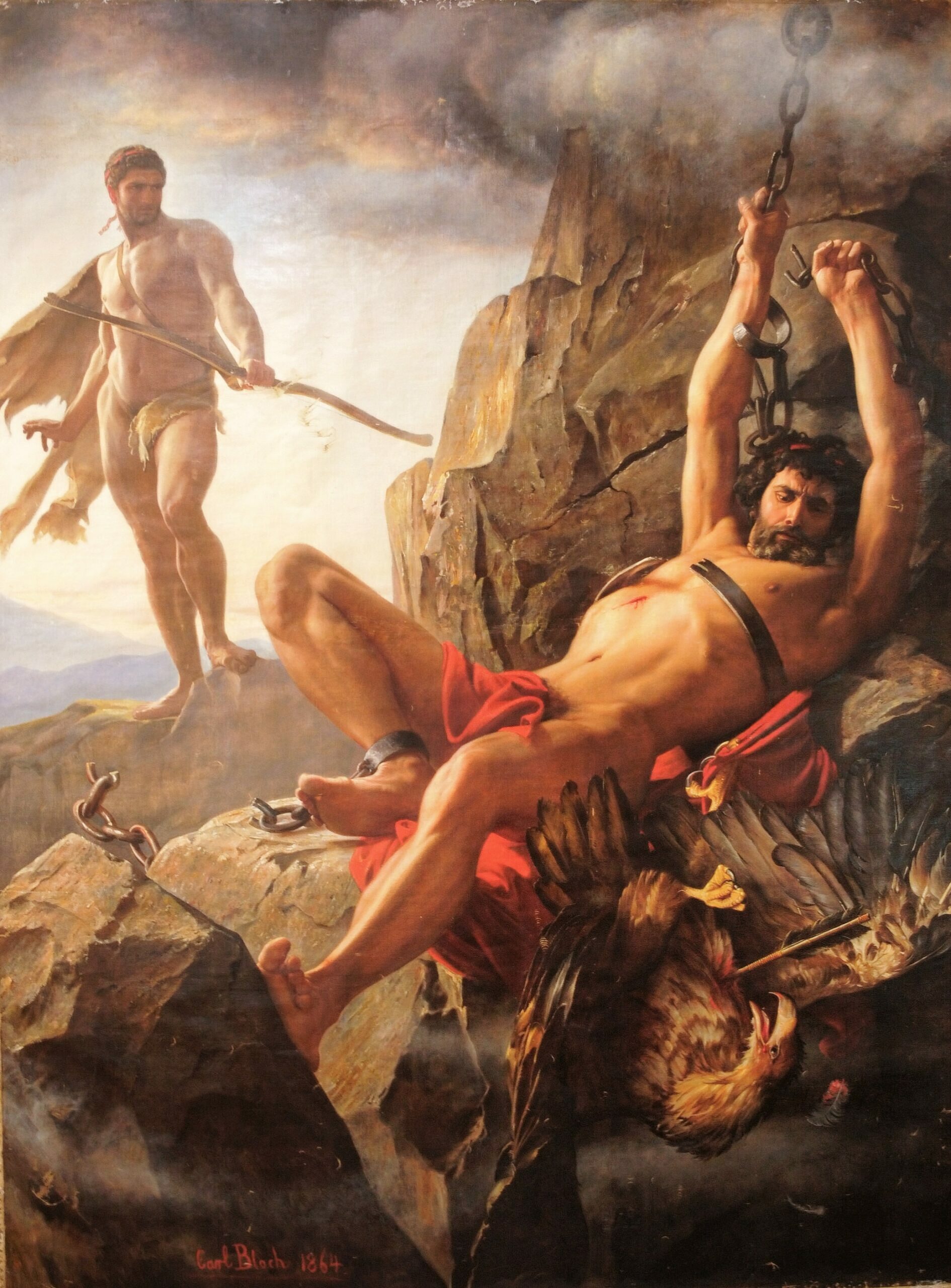
- Prometheus Unbound
- Artist: Carl Bloch
- Year: 1864
- Medium: Oil paint on canvas
- Subject: Prometheus
- Dimensions: 3.98 m × 2.77 m (157 in × 109 in)
- Location: Tatoi Palace

Prometheus Unbound is an oil-on-canvas painting by the Danish painter Carl Bloch.

== Description ==
It is a Romantic painting and depicts the myth of Prometheus freeing himself from chains, having defeated the eagle that ate his liver. It measures 3.98 by 2.77 meters.

== History ==
Prometheus Unbound was painted in 1864, having been commissioned by George I of Greece, and was first shown in 1865. It was shown in Charlottenborg in Copenhagen, to great acclaim, and was then shipped to Athens, where it hung in the royal palace. It returned to Denmark for Charlottenborg in 1932, but by this time it was considerably less popular among visitors. In the 1980s, people became more interested in Bloch's works, but by then it was not possible to locate Prometheus Unbound. In spring 2022, an employee at the Ribe Kunstmuseum discovered that the painting was in storage in the former royal collection in Athens, now managed by the Greek Ministry of Culture. The Ministry of Culture declared it a national monument, then it was loaned to Denmark in 2023 for display at the National Gallery of Denmark for a retrospective of Bloch's artwork. After this show, it was displayed in the Museum of Pavlos and Alexandra Kanellopoulou, then transferred to the permanent collection of the Tatoi Palace.

== See also ==
- Greek mythology in popular culture
- Lost artworks
- Prometheus Unbound (Aeschylus)
