= Soren Edsberg =

Danish-born American painter (1945–2921)

Soren Edsberg (born Søren Edsberg, 1945– 2021) was a Danish painter who emigrated to the United States. His work has been highly praised by Alexandre Cirici Pellicer.

== Biography ==
He was the son of Knud Edsberg who was also a painter. First Knud and then Soren joined the Church of Jesus Christ of Latter-day Saints (LDS Church) in 1961.

Many of Edsberg's works are of farm animals. He also made several abstract works, including ones in which he inscribed verses of scripture on the art work. One of his more widely acclaimed works is entitled The Course of Life.

Edsberg was married to Johnna, a convert to the LDS Church, whom he met while she was studying at the Royal Academy of Music in Copenhagen. They had seven children.

In 1987, Edsberg immigrated to the United States and became an adjunct professor at Brigham Young University. He also was involved in producing videos for educational and medical purposes. He also operated the Hope Gallery of art in Salt Lake City. Additionally, he operated a branch of the gallery in Provo, Utah.

Edsberg died September 25, 2021, of natural causes.
