= Carl Bloch =

Danish painter (1834–1890)

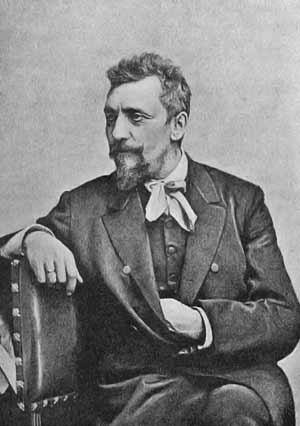
- Born: Carl Heinrich Bloch; 23 May 1834; Copenhagen, Denmark
- Died: 22 February 1890 (aged 55)
- Education: Royal Danish Academy of Art
- Occupation: Painter
- Notable work: In a Roman Osteria; Prometheus Unbound
- Spouse: Alma Trepka (died 1886)
- Website: carlbloch.org

Carl Heinrich Bloch (Danish pronunciation: [ˈkʰɑːˀl ˈplɒk]; 23 May 1834 – 22 February 1890) was a Danish painter.

== Early life and education ==
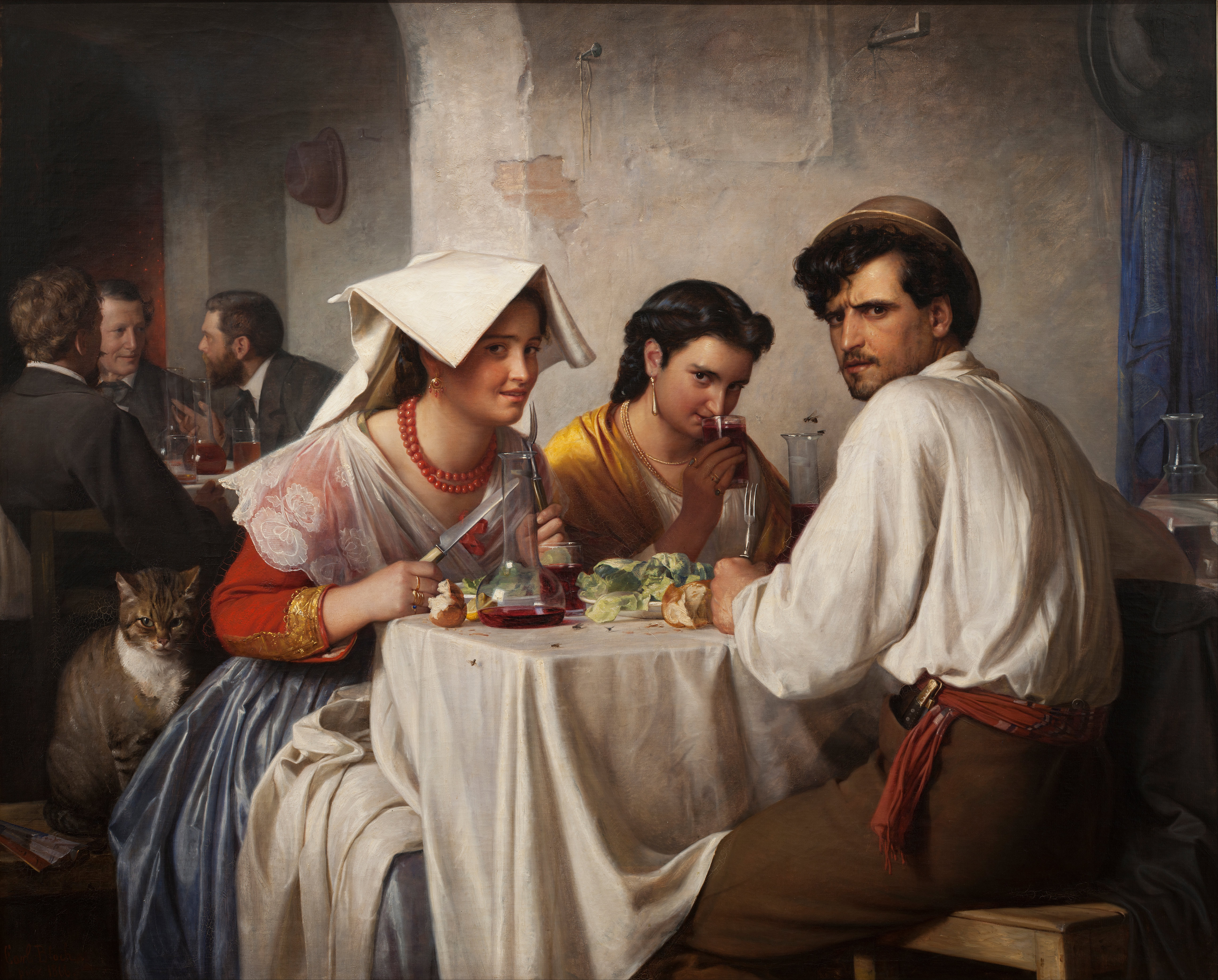
In a Roman Osteria, 1866

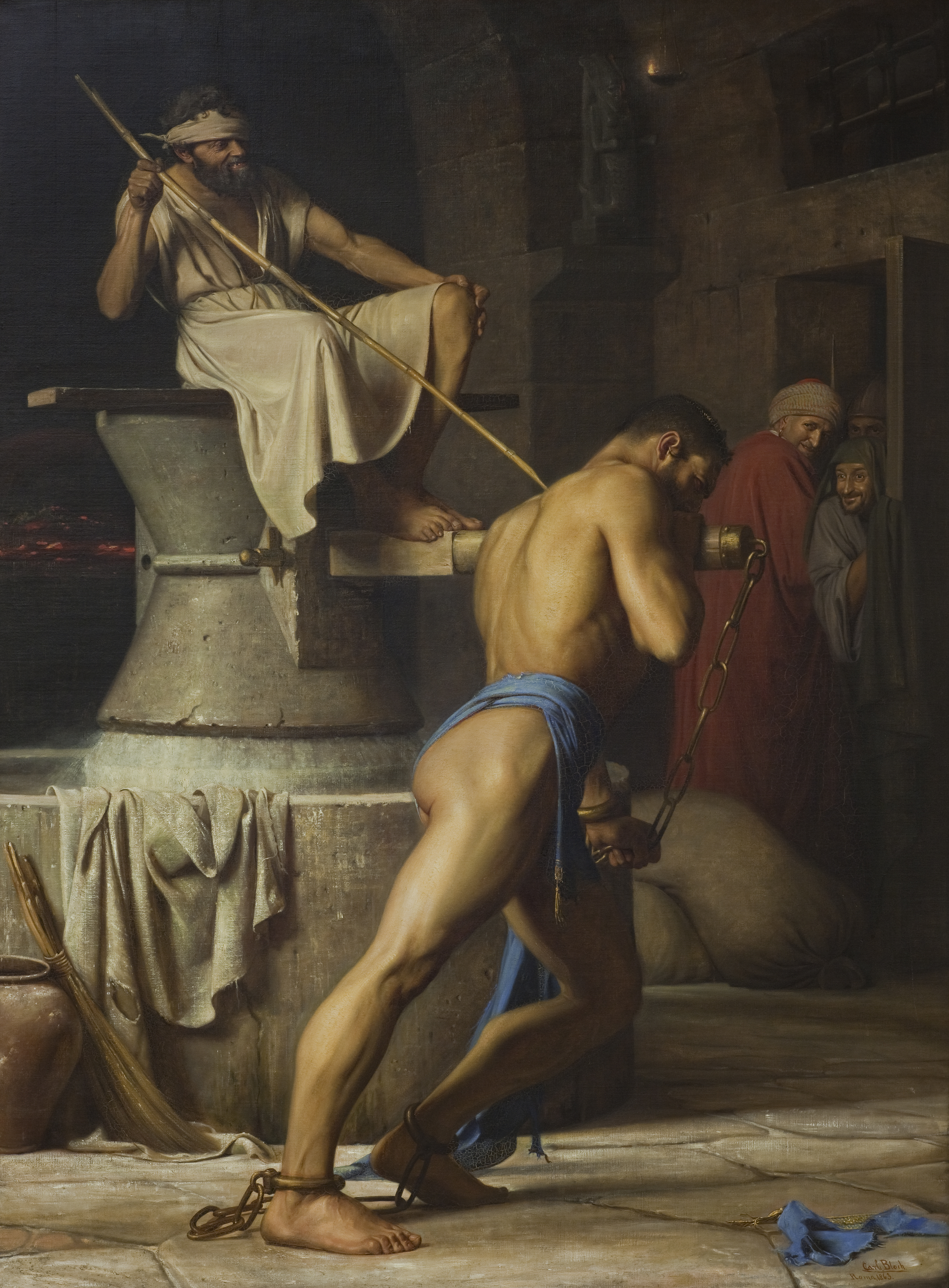
Samson in the Treadmill

Bloch was born in Copenhagen, Denmark, and studied there at the Royal Danish Academy of Art (Det Kongelige Danske Kunstakademi) under Wilhelm Marstrand.

His parents wanted their son to enter what they considered to be a respectable profession – an officer in the Navy. This, however, was not what he wanted. His only interest was drawing and painting, and he was consumed by the idea of becoming an artist.

Bloch went to Italy to study art, passing through the Netherlands, where he became acquainted with the work of Rembrandt, which became a major influence on him.

== Career ==
Bloch's early work featured rural scenes from everyday life. From 1859 to 1866, Bloch lived in Italy, and this period was important for the development of his historical style.

His first great success was the exhibition of his 1864 painting Prometheus Unbound in Copenhagen in 1865.

After the death of Marstrand, Bloch finished the decoration of the ceremonial hall at the University of Copenhagen.

In a New Year's letter from 1866 to Bloch, H. C. Andersen wrote: "What God has arched on solid rock will not be swept away!" Another letter from Andersen declared "Through your art you add a new step to your Jacob-ladder into immortality."

In a final ode, from a famous writer to a famous artist, Andersen said "Write on the canvas; write your seal on immortality. Then you will become noble here on earth."

Bloch was then commissioned to produce twenty-three paintings for the King's Chapel at Frederiksborg Castle, located in Hillerød. These were all scenes from the life of Christ which have become very popular as illustrations. The originals, painted between 1865 and 1879, are still at Frederiksborg Castle. The altarpieces can be found at Holbæk, Odense, Ugerløse and Copenhagen in Denmark, as well as Löderup, Hörup, and Landskrona in Sweden and Hvalvík in the Faroe Islands.

=== Influence on art of The Church of Jesus Christ of Latter-day Saints ===
For over forty years, The Church of Jesus Christ of Latter-day Saints has made heavy use of Bloch's paintings, mostly from the Frederiksborg Castle collection, in its church buildings and printed media.

The church has produced films depicting scriptural accounts of Christ's public ministry, using Bloch's paintings as models for the colour, light and overall set design, as well as the movement of the actors in many of the films' scenes. The most notable example of this is its 2000 film The Testaments of One Fold and One Shepherd.

The church's interest in Bloch's work was generally popularized by Latter-day Saint missionary and writer Doyle L. Green, who valued the classically trained realism of his artwork, as opposed to the trend towards abstraction in contemporary art of the time.

It has been further argued that the Protestant lack of iconographic features in his works, as well as the lack of "Catholic" motifs such as halos and wings, also helped to make his artworks comfortable for Latter-day Saint audiences.

Through the assistance of Danish-born artist Soren Edsberg (born 1945), the acquisition of Christ Healing at the Pool of Bethesda (formerly owned by Indre Mission, Copenhagen, Denmark) was made possible for Brigham Young University Museum of Art, located in Provo, Utah. A second work by Bloch, an 1880 grisaille version of The Mocking of Christ, was purchased by BYU in June 2015.

== Personal life ==
Bloch met his future wife, Alma Trepka, in Rome, where he married her on 31 May 1868. They were happily married until her early death in 1886. The sorrow over losing his wife weighed heavily on Bloch, and being left alone with their eight children after her death was very difficult for him.

=== Death and eulogies ===
Bloch died of cancer on 22 February 1890. His death came as "an abrupt blow for Nordic art", according to an article by Sophus Michaelis. Michaelis stated that "Denmark has lost the artist that indisputably was the greatest among the living." Kyhn stated in his eulogy at Bloch's funeral that "Bloch stays and lives."

Danish art critic Karl Madsen stated that Bloch reached higher toward the great heaven of art than all other Danish art up to that date. Madsen also said "If there is an Elysium, where the giant, rich, warm and noble artist souls meet, there Carl Bloch will sit among the noblest of them all!".

== Gallery ==
Carl Heinrich Bloch - Life of Jesus

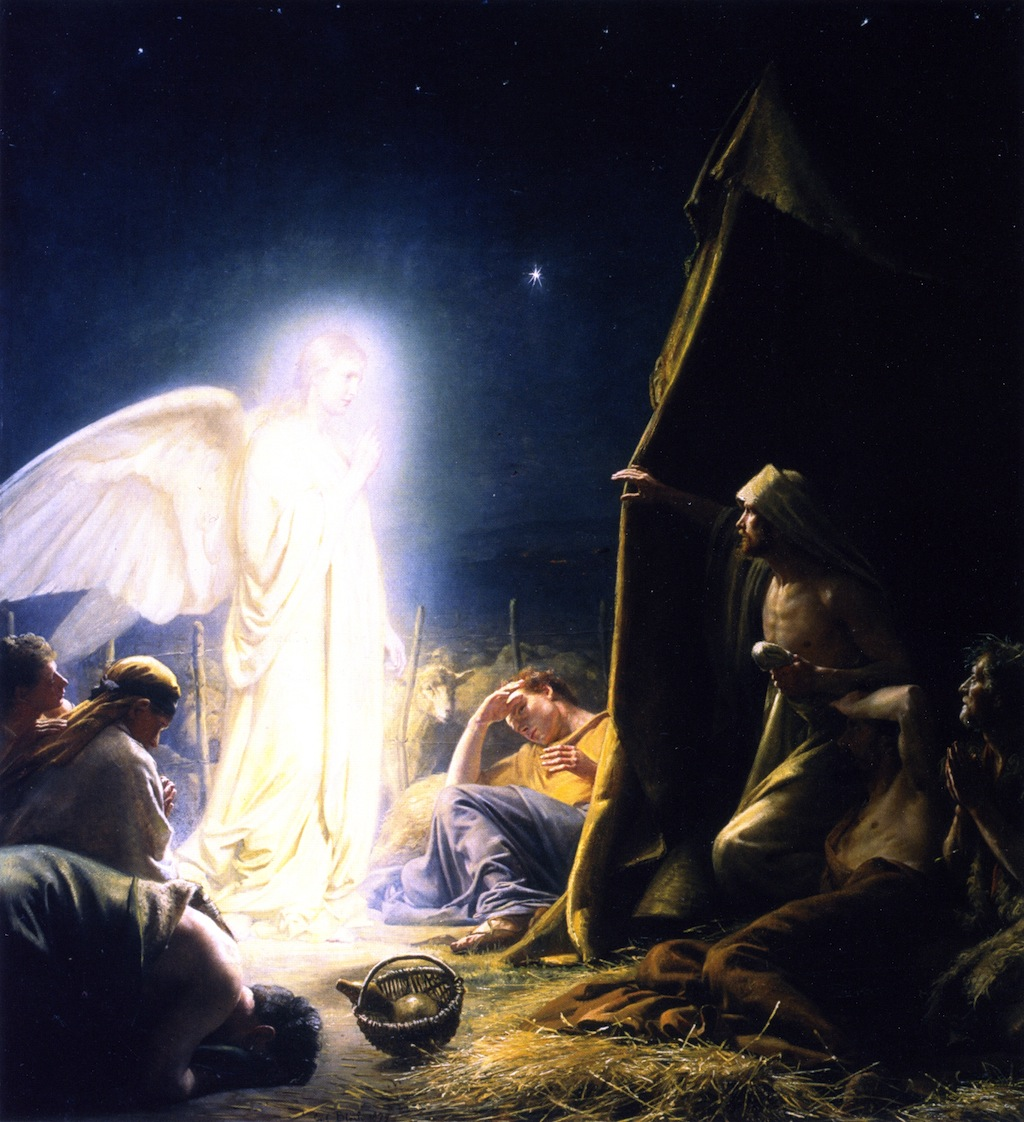
The Shepherds and the Angel

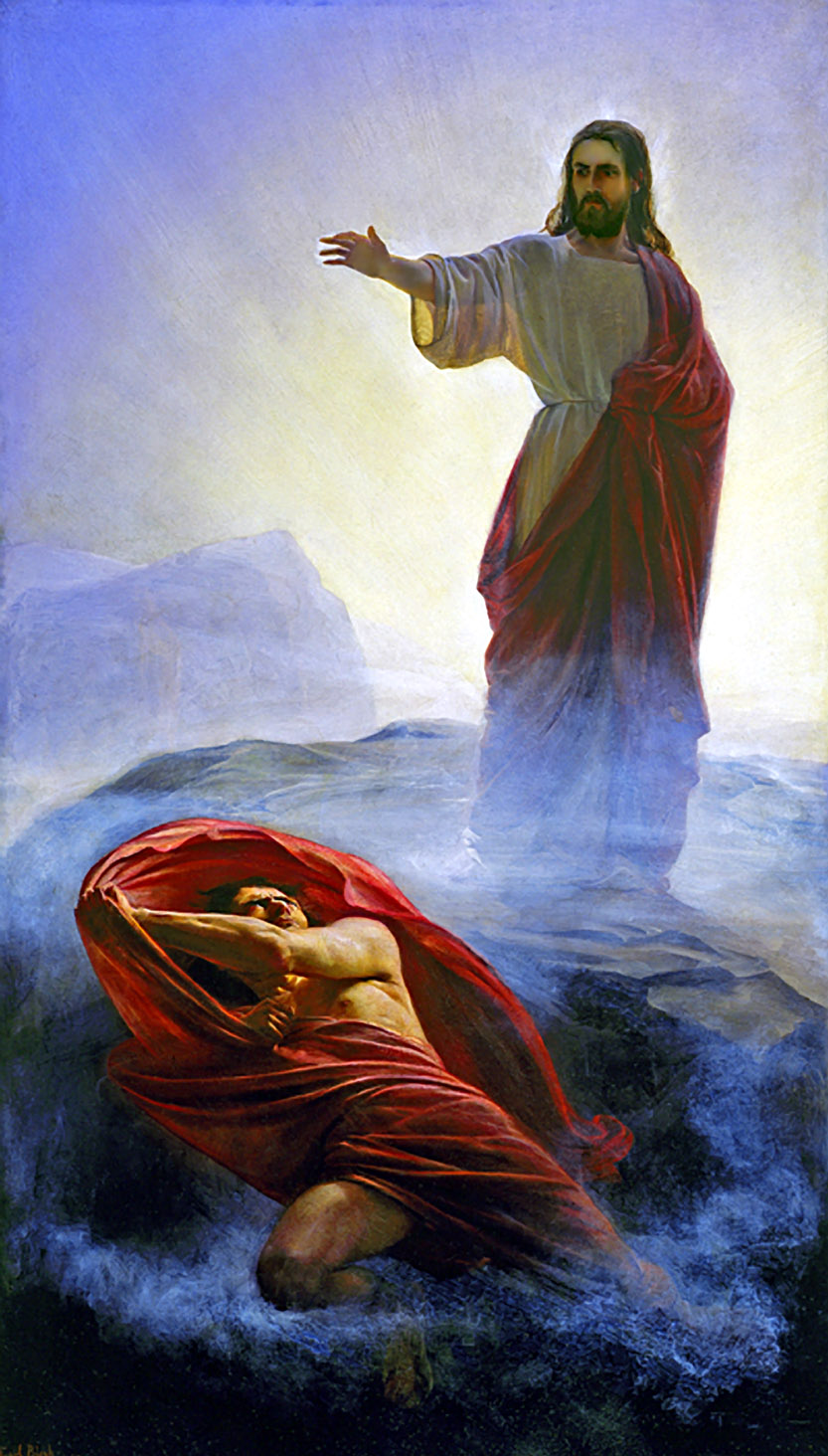
Jesus Tempted

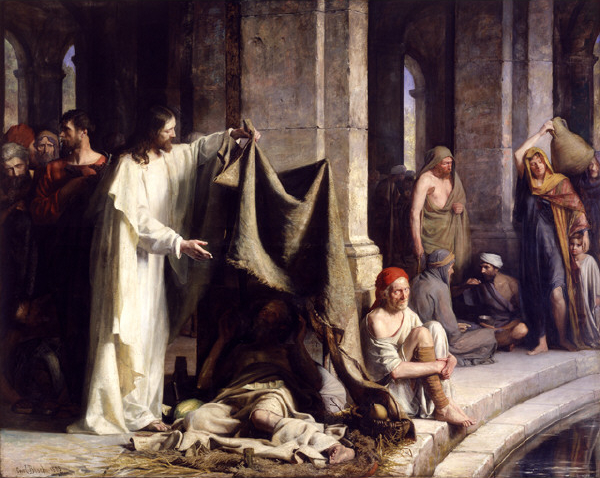
Christ Healing the Sick

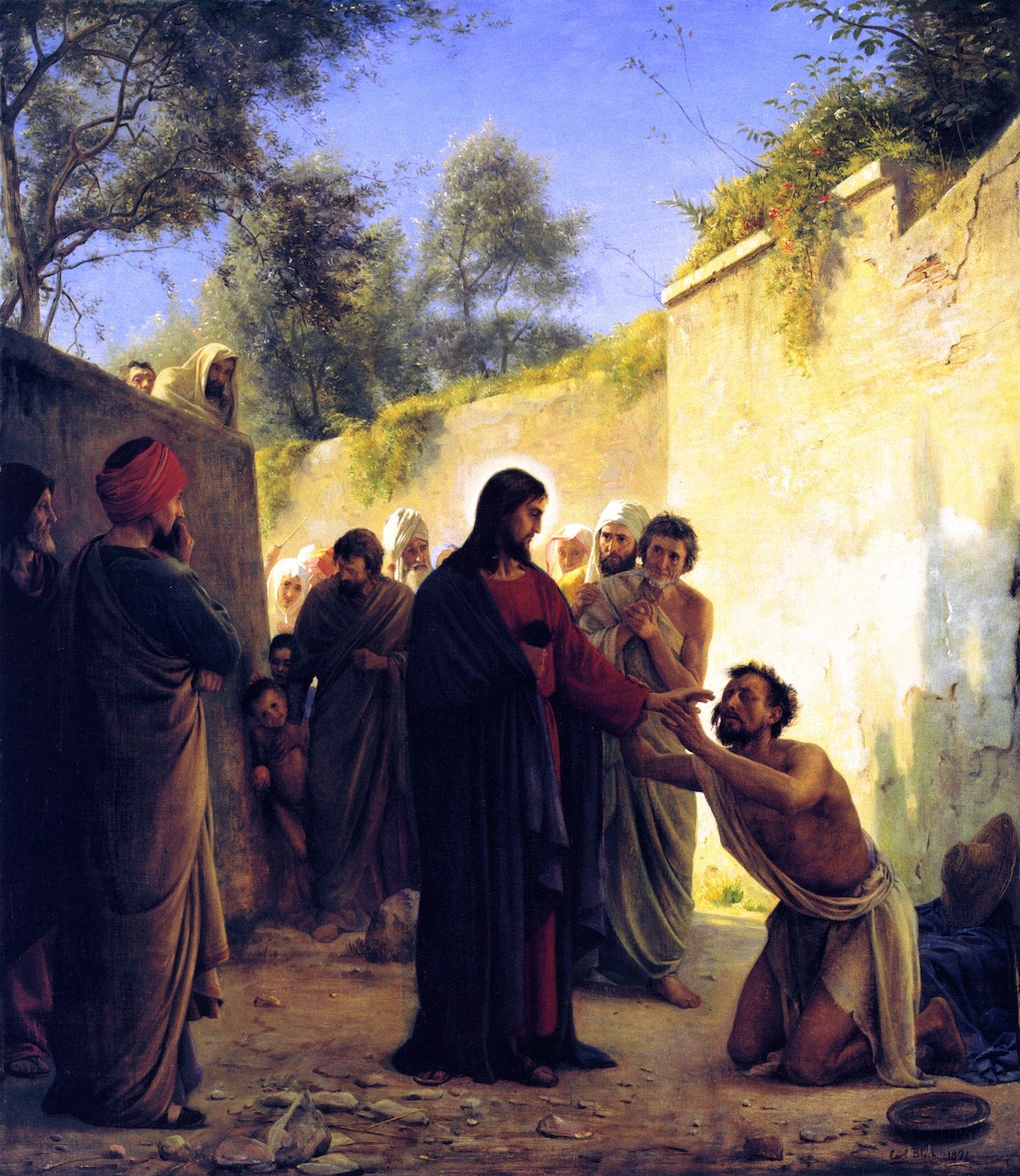
Healing of the Blind Man by Jesus Christ

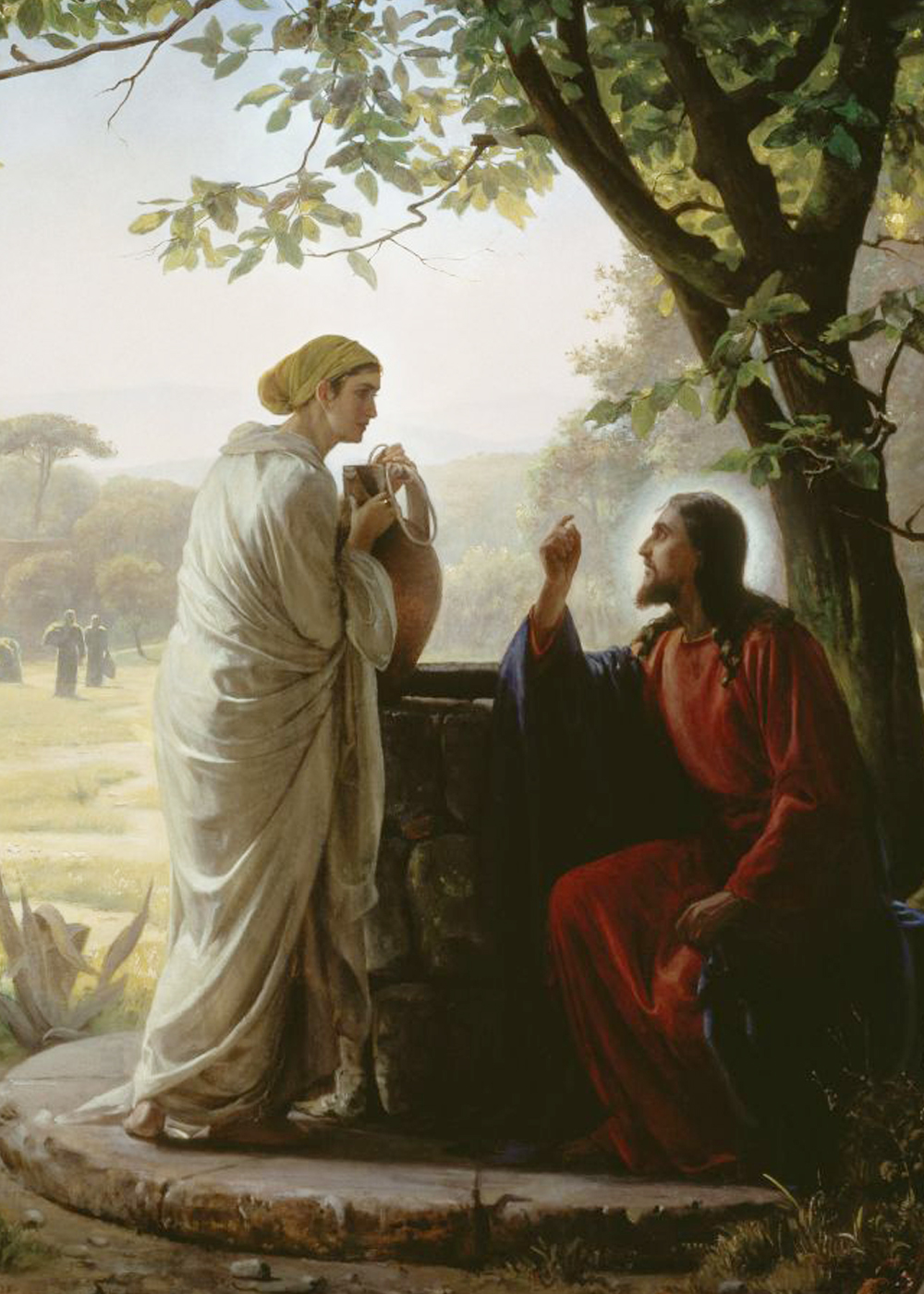
Woman at the Well

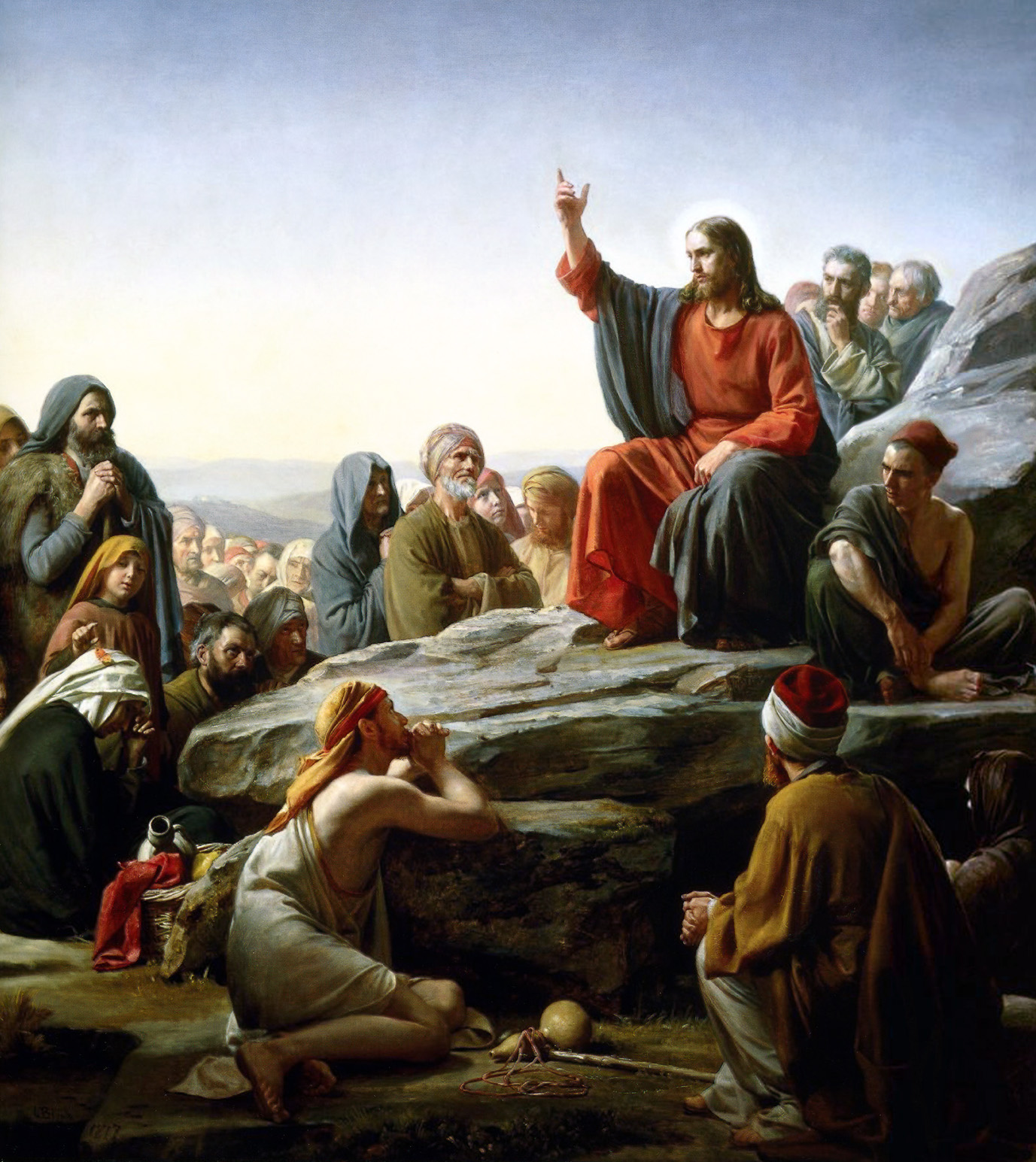
The Sermon on the Mount

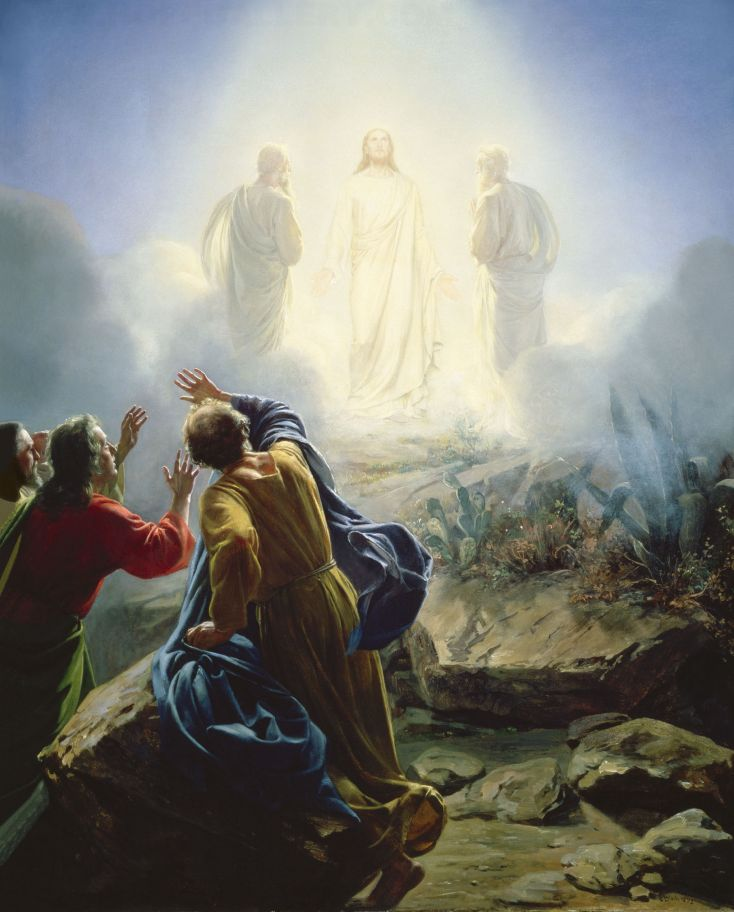
Transfiguration

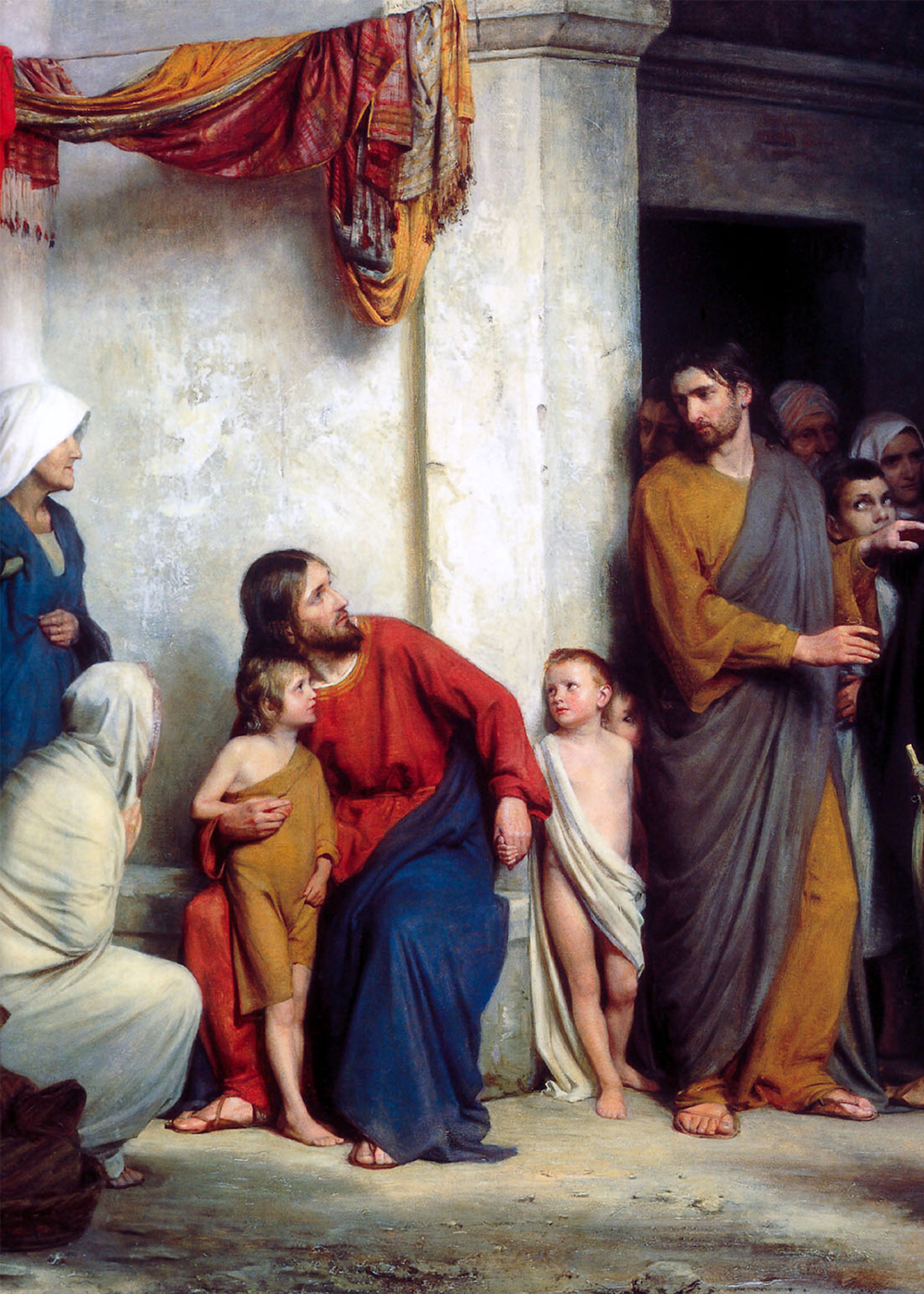
Suffer the Children

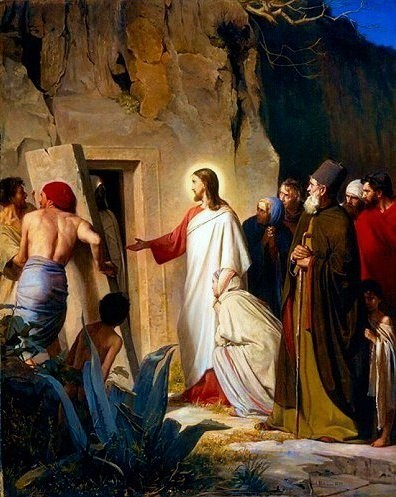
Raising of Lazarus

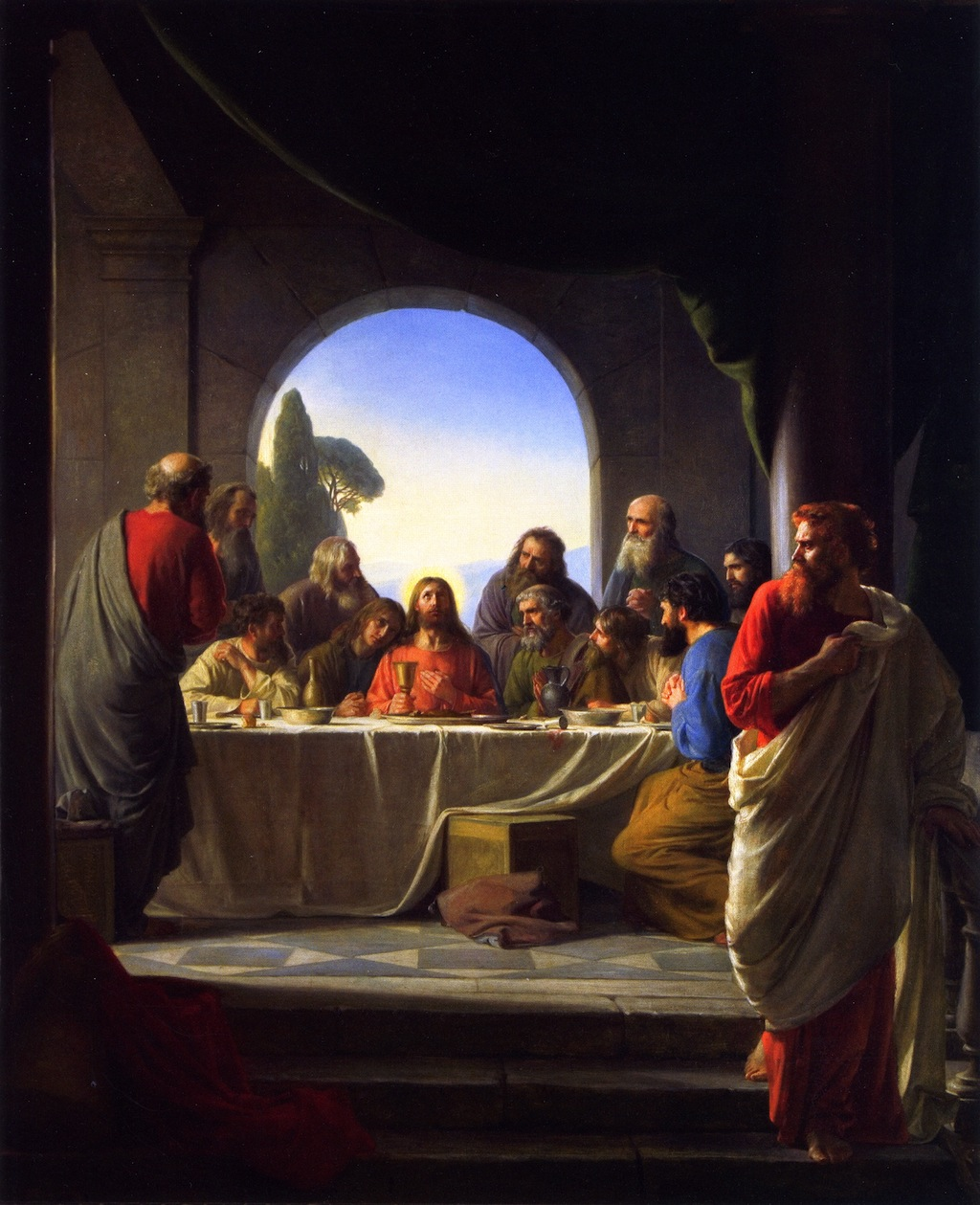
The Last Supper

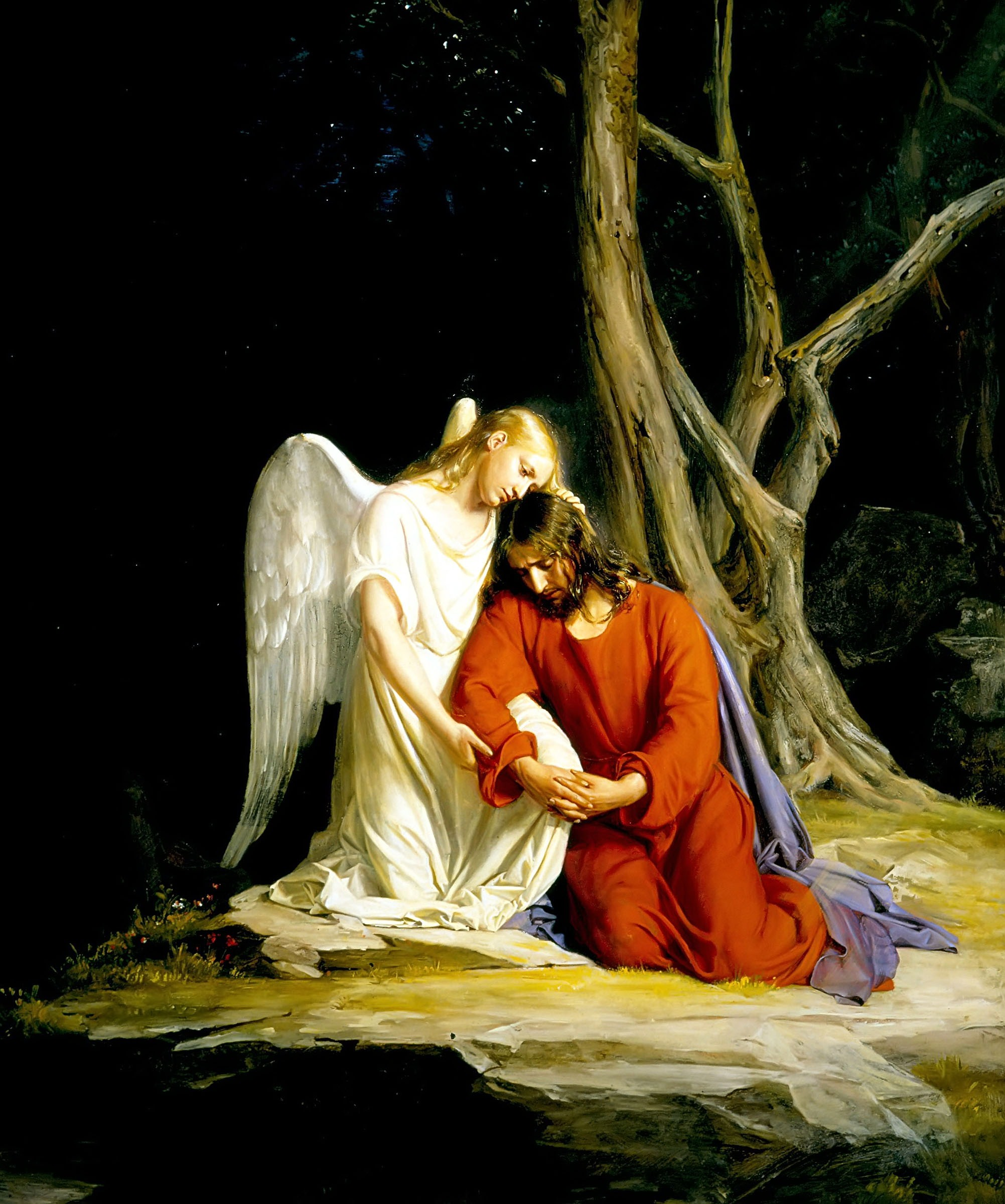
Gethsemane

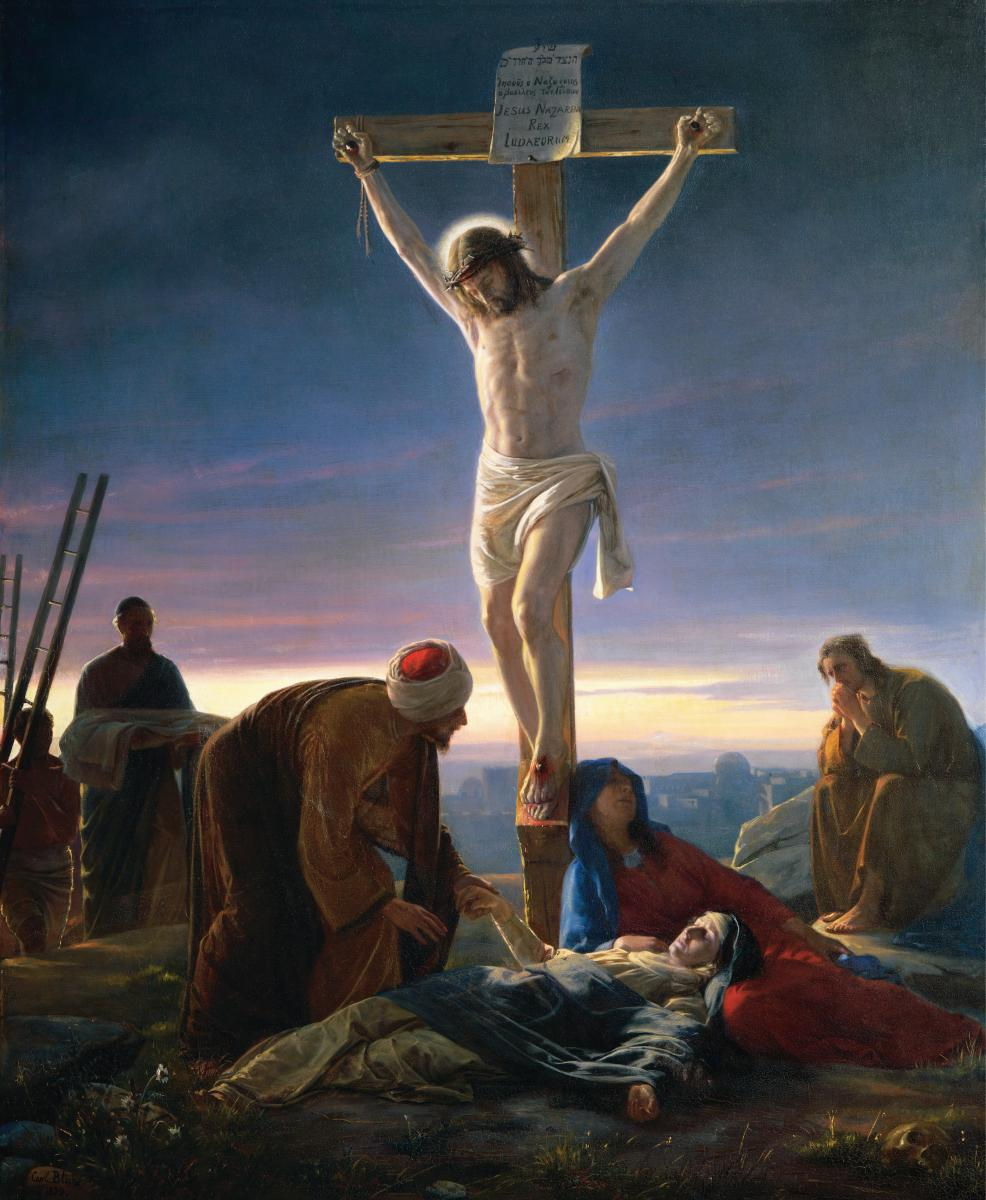
Christ on the Cross

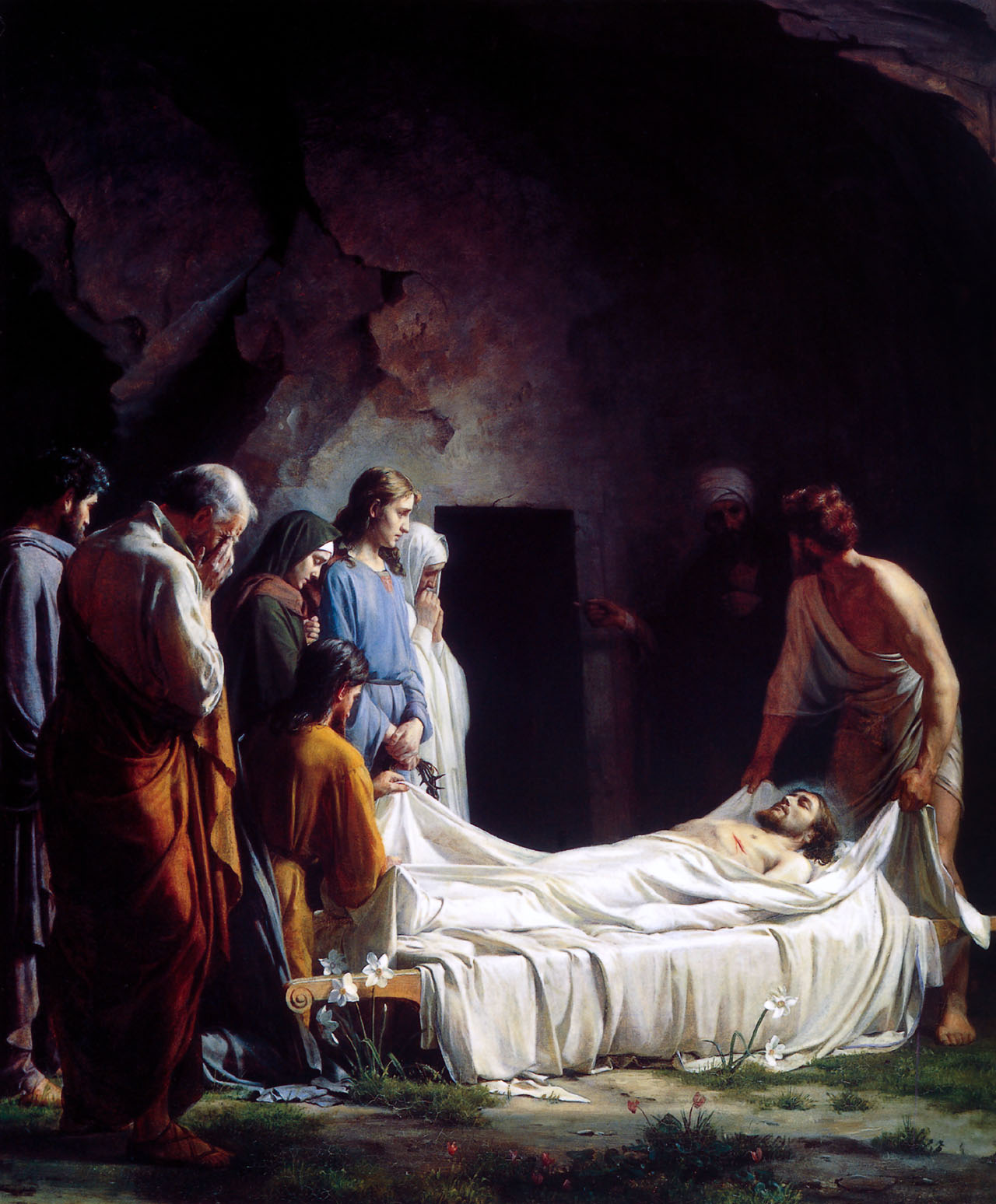
Burial of Christ

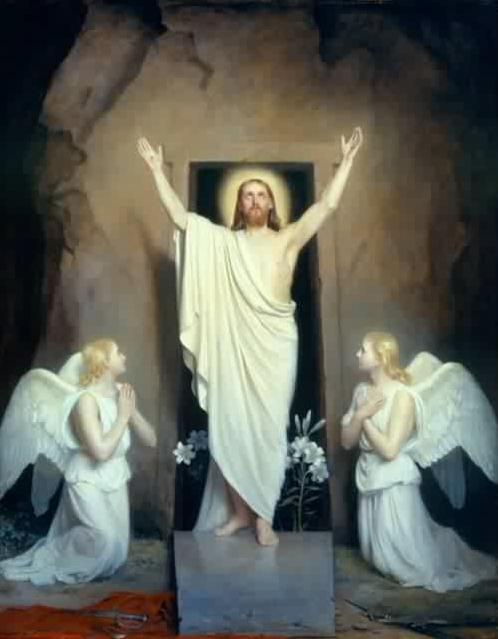
The Resurrection Of Christ
